= 1994 Cork Junior A Hurling Championship =

- Dates: 17 September - 23 October 1994
- Teams: 7
- Champions: Carrigtwohill (5th title); Seán Barry (captain)
- Runners-up: Barryroe; Seán O'Regan (captain)

Tournament statistics
- Matches played: 6
- Goals scored: 19 (3.17 per match)
- Points scored: 114 (19 per match)
- Top scorer(s): Eoin O'Mahony (0-15)

The 1994 Cork Junior A Hurling Championship was the 97th staging of the Cork Junior A Hurling Championship since its establishment by the Cork County Board.

The final was played on 23 October 1994 at Páirc Uí Chaoimh in Cork between Carrigtwohill and Barryroe, in what was their first ever meeting in the final. Carrigtwohill won the match by 0–12 to 1–07 to claim a record-equalling fifth championship title overall and a first title in 28 years.

Carrigtwohill's Eoin O'Mahony was the championship's top scorer with 0–15.

== Qualification ==
Division	Championship	Champions
Avondhu	North Cork Junior A Hurling Championship	Fermoy
Carbery	South West Junior A Hurling Championship	Barryroe
Carrigdhoun	South East Junior A Hurling Championship	Ballinhassig
Duhallow	Duhallow Junior A Hurling Championship	Meelin
Imokilly	East Cork Junior A Hurling Championship	Carrigtwohill
Muskerry	Mid Cork Junior A Hurling Championship	Cloughduv
Seandún	City Junior A Hurling Championship	Nemo Rangers

== Results ==
=== Quarter-finals ===
17 September 1994 Quarter-final	Fermoy	3-08 - 1-07	Meelin	Páirc Mhic Ghiobúin
	T Cooney 1-1, B McCarthy 1-0, T Slattery 1-0, B Hazelwood 0-2, N O'Donnell 0-2, P O'Connor 0-1, J Ahern 0-1, D Higgins 0-1.		N Brosnan 0-5, T Mahony 1-1, J Brosnan 0-1.

17 September 1994 Quarter-final	Ballinhassig	2-10 - 1-08	Cloughduv	Ballinora Grounds
	Denis McCarthy 1-2, J Aherne 1-1, S McCarthy 0-4, Damien McCarthy 0-1, P Cussen 0-1, C Cottrell 0-1.		B Coughlan 1-0, T O'Riordan 0-2, L Leahy 0-2, M Nyhan 0-2, C Foley 0-1, D Lynch 0-1.	Referee: J Kearney (Na Piarsaigh)

18 September 1994 Quarter-final	Carrigtwohill	1-13 - 1-11	Nemo Rangers	Riverstown Sportsfield
	Jim O'Connor 1-3, E O'Mahony 0-5, N Gubbins 0-1, S Collins 0-1, R Kidney 0-1, A Healy 0-1, S Farrell 0-1.		C McCarthy 1-4, J Coogan 0-2, M Cotter 0-1, M Cronin 0-1, D Creedon 0-1, S McGrath 0-1, J Mulcahy 0-1.	Referee: P O'Neill (Shamrocks)

- Barryroe received a bye in this round.

=== Semi-finals ===
2 October 1994 Semi-final	Carrigtwohill	1-13 - 0-12	Ballinhassig	Páirc Uí Rinn
	E O'Mahony 0-7, D Scannell 1-0, John O'Connor 0-2, Jim O'Connor 0-1, P Kidney 0-1, D Scannell 0-1, A Healy 0-1.		S McCarthy 0-6, Denis McCarthy 0-3, Damien McCarthy 0-1, D Lombard 0-1, C Contrell 0-1.	Referee: W Horgan (Brian Dillons)

2 October 1994 Semi-final	Barryroe	3-10 - 5-03	Fermoy	Páirc Uí Rinn
	E McCarthy 2-0, D Fleming 1-2, Murphy 0-3, K McCarthy 0-2, P Collins 0-1, B Whelton 0-1, A White 0-1.		I O'Callaghan 2-1, S McGrath 1-0, J Aherne 1-0, P O'Connor 1-0, B Carney 0-1, T Slattery 0-1.	Referee: K Healy (Ballymartle)

=== Final ===
23 October 1994 Final	Carrigtwohill	0-12 - 1-07	Barryroe	Páirc Uí Chaoimh
	Jim O'Connor 0-7, E O'Mahony 0-3, S Barry 0-1, N Gubbins 0-1.		B Whelton 1-1, D Fleming 0-3, K McCarthy 0-2, L Murphy 0-1.	Referee: W Horgan (Brian Dillons)

== Championship statistics ==
=== Top scorers ===
Overall

Rank	Player	Club	Tally	Total	Matches	Average
1	Eoin O'Mahony	Carrigtwohill	0-15	15	3	5.00
2	Jim O'Connor	Carrigtwohill	1-11	14	3	4.66
3	Seán McCarthy	Ballinhassig	0-10	10	2	5.00
4	Denis McCarthy	Ballinhassig	1-05	8	2	4.00
5	Damien Fleming	Barryroe	1-05	8	3	2.66

In a single game

Rank	Player	Club	Tally	Total	Opposition
1	Ivan O'Callaghan	Fermoy	2-01	7	Barryroe
1	Colin McCarthy	Nemo Rangers	1-04	7	Carrigtwohill
1	Jim O'Connor	Carrigtwohill	0-07	7	Barryroe
1	Eoin O'Mahony	Carrigtwohill	0-07	7	Ballinhassig
5	Eoin McCarthy	Barryroe	2-00	6	Fermoy
5	Jim O'Connor	Carrigtwohill	1-03	6	Nemo Rangers
5	Seán McCarthy	Ballinhassig	0-06	6	Carrigtwohill
8	Denis McCarthy	Ballinhassig	1-02	5	Cloughduv
8	Damien Fleming	Barryroe	1-02	5	Fermoy
8	Ned Brosnan	Meelin	0-05	5	Fermoy
8	Eoin O'Mahony	Carrigtwohill	0-05	5	Nemo Rangers
