= 1902 Cork Junior Hurling Championship =

Irish hurling competition

- Champions: St Finbarr's (1st title)

The 1902 Cork Junior Hurling Championship was the eighth staging of the Cork Junior Hurling Championship since its establishment by the Cork County Board in 1895.

St Finbarr's won the championship title for the first time in their history.
