= 2001 Cork Junior A Hurling Championship =

- Dates: 29 September – 11 November 2001
- Teams: 7
- Sponsor: TSB Bank
- Champions: Courcey Rovers (1st title); Denis Twomey (captain)
- Runners-up: Charleville

Tournament statistics
- Matches played: 6
- Goals scored: 17 (2.83 per match)
- Points scored: 129 (21.5 per match)
- Top scorer(s): John Quinlan (2-15)

The 2001 Cork Junior A Hurling Championship was the 104th staging of the Cork Junior A Hurling Championship since its establishment by the Cork County Board in 1895. The championship ran from 30 September to 11 November 2001.

The final was played on 11 November 2001 at Páirc Uí Chaoimh in Cork, between Courcey Rovers and Charleville, in what was their first ever meeting in the final. Courcey Rovers won the match by 3–09 to 3–07 to claim their first ever championship title.

Charleville's John Quinlan was the championship's top scorer with 2–15.

== Qualification ==
Division	Championship	Champions
Avondhu	North Cork Junior A Hurling Championship	Charleville
Carbery	West Cork Junior A Hurling Championship	Diarmuid Ó Mathúna's
Carrigdhoun	South East Junior A Hurling Championship	Courcey Rovers
Duhallow	Duhallow Junior A Hurling Championship	Freemount
Imokilly	East Cork Junior A Hurling Championship	Fr O'Neill's
Muskerry	Mid Cork Junior A Hurling Championship	Grenagh
Seandún	City Junior A Hurling Championship	Glen Rovers

== Results ==
=== First round ===
29 September 2001 First round	Charleville	0-13 - 2-06	Glen Rovers	Páirc na Bride
	J Quinlan 0-6, M Gammell 0-3, T Fitzgibbon 0-2, M Aherne 0-1, P Gammell 0-1.		C Buckley 1-1, Derek Goggin 1-0, J Coughlan 0-1, D Cooper 0-1, M O'Connell 0-1, P O'Brien 0-1, R Kelleher 0-1.

30 September 2001 First round	Courcey Rovers	6-17 - 2-07	Grenagh	Páirc Uí Chaoimh
	M O'Donovan 2-3, J Murphy 1-4, B Hayes 1-3, D Twomey 1-1, S Hayes 1-0, N Murphy 0-3, D Murphy 0-1, V Hurley 0-1, D Hayes 0-1.		D O'Riordan 2-0, D Dorgan 0-3, S Coleman 0-2, T Kenny 0-1, John Russell 0-1.

14 October 2001 First round	Diarmuid Ó Mathúna's	0-16 - 0-15	Fr. O'Neill's	Páirc Uí Rinn
	JP O'Callaghan 0-11, S Coughlan 0-2, G McCarthy 0-1, C O'Leary 0-1, J Nyhan 0-1.		L Swyane 0-6, E Conway 0-4, E Holland 0-2, A Brett 0-2, M Broderick 0-1.

=== Semi-finals ===
7 October 2001 Semi-final	Charleville	0-14 - 1-08	Freemount	Páirc Uí Chaoimh
	J Quinlan 0-5, M Gammell 0-4, J Collins 0-2, T Fitzgibbon 0-1, S McSweeney 0-1, M Aherne 0-1.		M Enright 1-0, D Broderick 0-3, B Broderick 0-2, J O'Flynn 0-2, B Murphy 0-1.

21 October 2001 Semi-final	Courcey Rovers	1-09 - 0-08	Diarmuid Ó Mathúna's	Ballymartle Grounds
	N Murphy 0-5, M O'Donovan 1-1, J Murphy 0-1, D Hayes 0-1, B Hayes 0-1.		JP O'Callaghan 0-6, D Nyhan 0-1, D Collins 0-1.

=== Final ===
11 November 2001 Final	Courcey Rovers	3-09 - 3-07	Charleville	Páirc Uí Chaoimh
	M O'Donovan 2-0, J Murphy 1-1, N Murphy 0-4, B Hayes 0-2, S Hayes 0-1, J Murphy 0-1.		J Quinlan 2-4, J Collins 1-0, M Gammell 0-2, M Aherne 0-1.

== Championship statistics ==
=== Top scorers ===
Rank	Player	Club	Tally	Total	Matches	Average
1	John Quinlan	Charleville	2-15	21	3	7.00
2	Michael O'Donovan	Courcey Rovers	5-04	19	3	6.33
3	John Paul O'Callaghan	Diarmuid Ó Mathúna's	0-17	17	2	8.50
4	John Murphy	Courcey Rovers	2-06	12	3	4.00
4	Niall Murphy	Courcey Rovers	0-12	12	3	4.00
6	Brian Hayes	Courcey Rovers	1-06	9	3	3.00
6	Mervyn Gammell	Charleville	0-09	9	3	3.00
8	Dan O'Riordan	Grenagh	2-00	6	1	6.00
8	Luke Swayne	Fr O'Neill's	0-06	6	1	6.00
10	John Collins	Charleville	1-02	5	3	1.66

=== Miscellaneous ===
- Diarmuid Ó Mathúna's qualified for the championship for the very first time in their history.
