= 1990 Cork Junior A Hurling Championship =

- Dates: 7 October – 18 November 1990
- Teams: 7
- Champions: Midleton (4th title); Sylvie O'Mahony (captain)
- Runners-up: Ballincollig

Tournament statistics
- Matches played: 7
- Goals scored: 15 (2.14 per match)
- Points scored: 148 (21.14 per match)
- Top scorer(s): Kevin McCarthy (1-20)

The 1990 Cork Junior A Hurling Championship was the 93rd staging of the Cork Junior A Hurling Championship since its establishment by the Cork County Board. The draw for the opening fixtures took place on 17 December 1989. The championship began on 7 October 1990 and ended on 18 November 1990.

The final was played on 18 November 1990 at Páirc Uí Chaoimh in Cork between Midleton and Ballincollig, in what was their first ever meeting in the final. Midleton won the match by 1–15 to 1–09 to claim their fourth championship title overall and a first title in six years.

Midleton's Kevin McCarthy was the championship's top scorer with 1-20.

== Qualification ==
Division	Championship	Champions
Avondhu	North Cork Junior A Hurling Championship	Fermoy
Carbery	South West Junior A Hurling Championship	Bandon
Carrigdhoun	South East Junior A Hurling Championship	Carrigaline
Duhallow	Duhallow Junior A Hurling Championship	Meelin
Imokilly	East Cork Junior A Hurling Championship	Midleton
Muskerry	Mid Cork Junior A Hurling Championship	Ballincollig
Seandún	City Junior A Hurling Championship	St. Finbarr's

== Results ==
=== Quarter-finals ===
7 October 1990 Quarter-final	Fermoy	1-10 - 2-07	Carrigaline	Riverstown Sportsfield
	J Aherne 1-4, A Scannell 0-2, D Murphy 0-1, I O'Callaghan 0-1, A Coughlan 0-1, B O'Donnell 0-1.		A Harrington 0-6, S Stack 1-1, T O'Neill 1-0.	Referee: P Spillane (Carrigtwohill)

14 October 1990 Quarter-final	Ballincollig	2-07 - 0-09	St. Finbarr's	Páirc Uí Chaoimh
	M O'Mahony 1-0, B McCarthy 1-0, P O'Mahony 0-3, C Cronin 0-2, D Lucey 0-2.		D McCarthy 0-4, S Murphy 0-3, K Kiely 0-1, P O'Keeffe 0-1.	Referee: G Harrington (Carrigaline)

14 October 1990 Quarter-final	Fermoy	1-15 - 1-12 (aet)	Carrigaline	Riverstown Sportsfield
	J Ahern 0-5, J Murphy 1-1, P O'Brien 0-4, B O'Donnell 0-3, I O'Callaghan 0-2.		D Fitzgerald 1-2, A Harrington 0-5, P Ahern 0-2, G O'Donovan 0-1, G Cooney 0-1, T O'Neill 0-1.

21 October 1990 Quarter-final	Midleton	1-16 - 2-09	Bandon	Páirc Uí Chaoimh
	K McCarthy 1-7, M O'Mahony 0-3, N O'Neill 0-3, M Quirke 0-1, J Farrell 0-1, E Cleary 0-1.		P Crowley 1-5, R Wilmot 1-0, P Cahalane 0-1, P O'Donovan 0-1, M O'Flynn 0-1, J Keohane 0-1.	Referee: L O'Flynn (Éire Óg)

- Meelin received a bye in this round.

=== Semi-finals ===
28 October 1990 Semi-final	Ballincollig	0-12 - 1-08	Meelin	Fr. Con Buckley Park
	P O'Mahony 0-9, M O'Mahony 0-1, P Twomey 0-1, D Lucey 0-1.		T O'Mahony 1-2, J Browne 0-2, N Brosnan 0-2, D Fitzpatrick 0-1, G Angland 0-1.

4 November 1990 Semi-final	Midleton	0-14 - 2-05	Fermoy	St. Catherine's Park
	K McCarthy 0-7, M O'Mahony 0-2, N O'Neill 0-2, M Quirke 0-1, G O'Farrell 0-1, E Cleary 0-1.		I O'Callaghan 0-4, J Murphy 1-0, P O'Brien 1-0, B O'Donnell 0-1.

=== Final ===
18 November 1990 Final	Midleton	1-15 - 1-09	Ballincollig	Páirc Uí Chaoimh
	K McCarthy 0-6, E Crotty 1-1, M O'Mahony 0-4, J O'Farrell 0-2, N O'Neill 0-1, E Cleary 0-1.		P O'Mahony 0-5, T Weste 1-0, M O'Mahony 0-2, J O'Mahony 0-1, D Lucey 0-1.	Referee: S Crean (Bandon)

== Championship statistics ==
=== Top scorers ===
Overall

Rank	Player	Club	Tally	Total	Matches	Average
1	Kevin McCarthy	Midleton	1-20	23	3	7.66
2	Podsie O'Mahony	Ballincollig	0-17	17	3	5.66
3	James Aherne	Fermoy	1-09	12	3	4.00
4	Anthony Harrington	Carrigaline	0-11	11	2	5.50
5	Michael O'Mahony	Midleton	0-09	9	3	3.00

In a single game

Rank	Player	Club	Tally	Total	Opposition
1	Kevin McCarthy	Midleton	1-07	10	Bandon
2	Podsie O'Mahony	Ballincollig	0-09	9	Meelin
3	Pádraig Crowley	Bandon	1-05	8	Midleton
4	James Aherne	Fermoy	1-04	7	Carrigaline
4	Kevin McCarthy	Midleton	0-07	7	Fermoy
6	Anthony Harrington	Carrigaline	0-06	6	Fermoy
6	Kevin McCarthy	Midleton	0-06	6	Ballincollig
8	Declan Fitzgerald	Carrigaline	1-02	5	Fermoy
8	Tomás O'Mahony	Meelin	1-02	5	Ballincollig
8	James Aherne	Fermoy	0-05	5	Carrigaline
8	Anthony Harrington	Carrigaline	0-05	5	Fermoy
8	Podsie O'Mahony	Ballincollig	0-05	5	Midleton
