= 2009 Cork Junior A Hurling Championship =

- Dates: 10 October – 1 November 2009
- Teams: 7
- Sponsor: Evening Echo
- Champions: Fermoy (1st title); Trevor Grumbridge (captain); Tom Ryan (manager)
- Runners-up: Cloughduv; Tadhg McCarthy (captain); Jimmy Barry-Murphy (manager)

Tournament statistics
- Matches played: 7
- Goals scored: 8 (1.14 per match)
- Points scored: 173 (24.71 per match)
- Top scorer(s): Evan O'Keeffe (1-14); Darragh Ring (0-17)

The 2009 Cork Junior A Hurling Championship was the 112th staging of the Cork Junior A Hurling Championship since its establishment by the Cork County Board in 1895. The championship ran from 10 October to 1 November 2009.

The final was played on 1 November 2009 at Páirc Uí Rinn in Cork, between Fermoy and Cloughduv, in what was their first ever meeting in the final. Fermoy won the match by 1–14 to 0–10 to claim their first ever championship title.

Castlemartyr's Evan O'Keeffe and Cloughduv's Darragh Ring were the championship's top scorers.

== Qualification ==
Division	Championship	Champions
Avondhu	North Cork Junior A Hurling Championship	Fermoy
Carbery	South West Junior A Hurling Championship	Bandon
Carrigdhoun	South East Junior A Hurling Championship	Ballinhassig
Duhallow	Duhallow Junior A Hurling Championship	Meelin
Imokilly	East Cork Junior A Hurling Championship	Castlemartyr
Muskerry	Mid Cork Junior A Hurling Championship	Cloughduv
Seandún	City Junior A Hurling Championship	Nemo Rangers

== Results ==
=== First round ===
10 October 2009 First round	Cloughduv	1-17 - 1-14	Meelin	Mallow GAA Complex
	D Ring 0-9, G Shanahan 1-0, P Dunlea 0-3, D McCarthy 0-1, T O'Mahony 0-1, A Cronin 0-1, B Aherne 0-1, K Walsh 0-1.		E Brosnan 1-5, J Curtin 0-3, J Forrest 0-2, W Murphy 0-1, W Buckley 0-1, DJ O'Sullivan 0-1.

10 October 2009 First round	Fermoy	0-14 - 1-10	Bandon	Erin's Own Grounds
	T Grumbridge 0-4, M Flynn 0-4, J Hutchins 0-2, Brian O'Sullivan 0-2, P Shanahan 0-1, J O'Sullivan 0-1.		D Lehane 0-5, T Barrett 1-0, P Crowley 0-2, V Goggin 0-1, J O'Regan 0-1, D Burke 0-1.

10 October 2009 First round	Castlemartyr	1-10 - 0-13	Nemo Rangers	Páirc Uí Chonaill
	E O'Keeffe 1-3, B Smiddy 0-4, Barry Lawton 0-1, E Clifford 0-1, S Hennessy 0-1.		B Twomey 0-4, A Cronin 0-3, S Horgan 0-2, W Morgan 0-1, R Conlon 0-1, J Kerins 0-1, M Cronin 0-1.

18 October 2009 First round replay	Castlemartyr	0-16 - 1-11 (aet)	Nemo Rangers	Páirc Uí Chonaill
	E O'Keeffe 0-9, B Smiddy 0-4, D Bowens 0-2, Barry Lawton 0-1.		J Masters 1-1, W Morgan 0-3, S Horgan 0-2, B Twomey 0-2, D Niblock 0-1, M Cronin 0-1, R Conlon 0-1.

=== Semi-finals ===
18 October 2009 Semi-final	Fermoy	0-11 - 1-07	Ballinhassig	Páirc Uí Chaoimh
	B O'Sullivan 0-6, J Hutchins 0-2, J O'Sullivan 0-1, C O'Kane 0-1, A O'Connor 0-1.		D O'Callaghan 0-4, D Duggan 1-0, P Coleman 0-1, J Holland 0-1, J Finn 0-1.

25 October 2009 Semi-final	Cloughduv	0-18 - 1-07	Castlemartyr	Páirc Uí Rinn
	D Ring 0-4, D Corkery 0-3, P Dunlea 0-2, B Ahern 0-2, J Shanahan 0-2, T O'Mahony 0-2, K Walsh 0-1, D O'Sullivan 0-1, D McCarthy 0-1.		B Lawton 1-1, B Smiddy 0-3, E O'Keeffe 0-2, J Smiddy 0-1.

=== Final ===
1 November 2009 Final	Fermoy	1-14 - 0-10	Cloughduv	Páirc Uí Chaoimh
	B O'Sullivan 0-5, S Killeen 1-1, A O'Connor 0-3, P Shanahan 0-2, L Coleman 0-2, M Flynn 0-1.		D Ring 0-4, P Dunlea 0-2, B Ahern 0-2, K Walsh 0-1, D Corkery 0-1.

== Championship statistics ==
=== Top scorers ===
Rank	Player	Club	Tally	Total	Matches	Average
1	Evan O'Keeffe	Castlemartyr	1-14	17	3	5.66
1	Darragh Ring	Cloughduv	0-17	17	3	5.66
3	Brian O'Sullivan	Fermoy	0-13	13	3	4.33
4	Brian Smiddy	Castlemartyr	0-11	11	3	3.66
5	Éamonn Brosnan	Meelin	1-05	8	1	8.00
