= 1903 Cork Junior Hurling Championship =

Irish hurling competition

- Champions: St Finbarr's (2nd title)
- Runners-up: Blackrock

The 1903 Cork Junior Hurling Championship was the ninth staging of the Cork Junior Hurling Championship since its establishment by the Cork County Board in 1895.

St Finbarr's won the championship title for the second year in succession.
