= 1947 Cork Junior Hurling Championship =

Irish hurling competition

- Teams: 7
- Champions: Blackrock (5th title)
- Runners-up: Castemartyr

The 1947 Cork Junior Hurling Championship was the 50th staging of the Cork Junior Hurling Championship since its establishment by the Cork County Board in 1895.

The final was played on 2 November 1947 at the Clonmut Memorial Park in Midleton, between Blackrock and Castlemartyr, in what was their first ever meeting in the final. Blackrock won the match by 6-03 to 5-00 to claim a record-equalling fifth championship title and a first championship title in 16 years.

== Results ==
=== Final ===
2 November 1947 Final	Blackrock	6-03 - 5-00	Castlemartyr	Clonmult Memorial Park
