= 2005 Cork Junior A Hurling Championship =

- Dates: 24 September – 19 November 2005
- Teams: 7
- Sponsor: Evening Echo
- Champions: Fr O'Neill's (1st title); Ger Holland (captain)
- Runners-up: Kilworth

Tournament statistics
- Matches played: 7
- Goals scored: 16 (2.29 per match)
- Points scored: 143 (20.43 per match)
- Top scorer(s): Paudie Lynch (1–20)

The 2005 Cork Junior A Hurling Championship was the 108th staging of the Cork Junior A Hurling Championship since its establishment by the Cork County Board in 1895. The championship ran from 24 September to 19 November 2005.

The final was played on 19 November 2005 at Páirc Uí Rinn in Cork, between Fr O'Neill's and Kilworth, in what was their first ever meeting in the final. Fr O'Neill's won the match by 0–15 to 1–09 to claim their first ever championship title.

Kilworth's Paudie Lynch was the championship's top scorer with 1–20.

== Qualification ==
Division	Championship	Champions
Avondhu	North Cork Junior A Hurling Championship	Kilworth
Carbery	South West Junior A Hurling Championship	Diarmuid Ó Mathúna's
Carrigdhoun	South East Junior A Hurling Championship	Shamrocks
Duhallow	Duhallow Junior A Hurling Championship	Frreemount
Imokilly	East Cork Junior A Hurling Championship	Fr O'Neill's
Muskerry	Mid Cork Junior A Hurling Championship	Grenagh
Seandún	City Junior A Hurling Championship	Mayfield

== Results ==
=== First round ===
24 September 2005 First round	Fr O'Neill's	4-14 - 0-10	Freemount	Fitzgerald Park
	J Flavin 1-7, K Wall 1-1, G O'Leary 0-4, P Butler 1-0, R Murphy 1-0, B Murphy 0-1, E Holland 0-1.		P Collins 0-7, K Broderick 0-1, M Enright 0-1, G Whitmore 0-1.

24 September 2005 First round	Shamrocks	0-10 - 1-06	Diarmuid Ó Mathúna's	Jack Barrett Park
	C O'Sullivan 0-5, S O'Neill 0-3, B Sweeney 0-1, M Prout 0-1.		JP O'Callaghan 0-5, S Crowley 1-0, J O'Donovan 0-1.

30 October 2005 First round	Kilworth	0-12 - 1-09	Grenagh	Páirc Uí Chaoimh
	E Pierce 0-7, P Lynch 0-4, J Cahill 0-1.		D Dorgan 0-6, J O'Neill 1-0, R Dorgan 0-1, D Dalton 0-1, T Kenny 0-1.

6 November 2005 First round replay	Kilworth	0-11 - 1-06	Grenagh	Fr. Con Buckley Park
	P Lynch 0-4, J Cahill 0-2, R Tobin 0-2, A Mannix 0-1, E Pierce 0-1, D McNamara 0-1.		S Coleman 1-0, DD Dorgan 0-2, A O'Neill 0-1, C Kenny 0-1, J Russell 0-1, T Kenny 0-1.

=== Semi-finals ===
9 October 2005 Semi-final	Fr O'Neill's	3-17 - 2-06	Shamrocks	Páirc Uí Rinn
	J Flavin 1-5, G O'Leary 1-4, K Wall 1-0, E Holland 0-3, G Holland 0-2, R Murphy 0-1, P Butler 0-1, C Buckley 0-1.		S O'Neill 0-4, D Collins 1-0, C O'Sullivan 1-0, C O'Neill 0-1, J Shanahan 0-1.

13 November 2005 Semi-final	Kilworth	1-12 - 2-06	Mayfield	Páirc Uí Rinn
	P Lynch 1-8, T Twomey 0-2, A Mannix 0-1, J Moakley 0-1.		N O'Driscoll 1-1, E Crowley 1-1, M Barry 0-2, J Donovan 0-1, D Sheehan 0-1.

=== Final ===
19 November 2005 Final	Fr O'Neill's	0-15 - 1-09	Kilworth	Páirc Uí Rinn
	G O'Leary 0-5, C Buckley 0-2, E Conway 0-2, P Butler 0-2, E Holland 0-2, J Flavin 0-1, E McCarthy 0-1.		T Twomey 1-1, P Lynch 0-4, D Cahill 0-1, J Cahill 0-1, E Pierce 0-1, N Gowen 0-1.

== Championship statistics ==
=== Top scorers ===
Rank	Player	Club	Tally	Total	Matches	Average
1	Paudie Lynch	Kilworth	1-20	23	4	5.75
2	John Flavin	Fr O'Neill's	2-13	19	3	6.33
3	Ger O'Leary	Fr O'Neill's	1-13	16	3	5.33
4	Elton Pierce	Kilworth	0-09	9	4	2.25
5	Colin O'Sullivan	Shamrocks	1-05	8	2	4.00
5	D. D. Dorgan	Grenagh	0-08	8	2	4.00
