= 2014 Cork Junior A Hurling Championship =

Sporting event in Cork, Ireland

- Dates: 20 September – 26 October 2014
- Teams: 7
- Sponsor: Evening Echo
- Champions: Castlemartyr (3rd title); Barra Ó Tuama (captain); Christy Connery (manager)
- Runners-up: Ballinhassig; David Brennan (captain)

Tournament statistics
- Matches played: 8
- Goals scored: 15 (1.88 per match)
- Points scored: 242 (30.25 per match)
- Top scorer(s): Barry Lawton (0-40)

The 2014 Cork Junior A Hurling Championship was the 117th staging of the Cork Junior A Hurling Championship since its establishment by the Cork County Board in 1895. The championship began on 20 September 2014 and ended on 26 October 2014.

On 26 October 2014, Castlemartyr won the championship following an 0-18 to 0-10 defeat of Ballinhassig in the final. This was their third championship title in the grade and their first since 1964.

Castlemartyr's Barry Lawton was the championship's top scorer with 0-40.

== Qualification ==
Division	Championship	Champions
Avondhu	North Cork Junior A Hurling Championship	Dromina
Carbery	South West Junior A Hurling Championship	Newcestown
Carrigdhoun	South East Junior A Hurling Championship	Ballinhassig
Duhallow	Duhallow Junior A Hurling Championship	Kilbrin
Imokilly	East Cork Junior A Hurling Championship	Castlemartyr
Muskerry	Mid Cork Junior A Hurling Championship	Cloughduv
Seandún	City Junior A Hurling Championship	St. Finbarr's

== Results ==
=== First round ===
20 September 2014 First round	Castlemartyr	0-22 - 2-16	Newcestown	Páirc Uí Chaoimh
	Barry Lawton 0-11, E Clifford 0-2, L Martin 0-2, J Smiddy 0-2, Barra Ó Tuama 0-2, B Smiddy 0-1, Brian Lawton 0-1, D McAuliffe 0-1.		C Healy 0-9, A Shorten 1-1, S O'Donovan 1-0, J Meade 0-3, D Curran 0-1, D Fahey 0-1, D Bradfield 0-1.

20 September 2014 First round	St. Finbarr's	2-11 - 0-19	Cloughduv	Brinny Sportsfield
	A Murphy 1-1, C Green 1-0, M Ryan 0-3, P Harte 0-2, S Callinan 0-2, P Kennedy 0-2, S Nott 0-1.		D Ring 0-11, S O'Connor 0-2, J Ryan 0-2, B Ahern 0-2, G Ahern 0-1, A Cronin 0-1.

27 September 2014 First round	Dromina	2-09 - 1-25	Kilbrin	John Joe Brosnan Memorial Park
	B Naughton 2-0, D Buckley 0-3, P Hayes 0-2, G Hayes 0-2, A O'Shughnessy 0-1, K Hayes 0-1.		S O'Reilly 0-6, S Crowley 0-4, C Sheehan 0-4, G Linehan 0-4, T O'Reilly 1-0, L Daly 0-2, N Field 0-2, W Egan 0-1, P Egan 0-1, M Linehan 0-1.

4 October 2014 First round replay	Newcestown	1-11 - 2-10	Castlemartyr	Páirc Uí Rinn
	C Healy 1-7, D Fahey 0-1, R Bradfield 0-1, C O'Donovan 0-1, B O'Donovan 0-1.		Barry Lawton 0-7, Brian Lawton 1-1, C Haines 1-0, Barra Ó Tuama 0-1, J Stack 0-1.

=== Semi-finals ===
5 October 2014 Semi-final	Kilbrin	2-10 - 0-17	Ballinhassig	Mallow GAA Complex
	S Crowley 1-6, S O'Reilly 1-2, K Sheahan 0-1, D O'Sullivan 0-1.		D Dineen 0-9, C Reynolds 0-3, M Ahern 0-2, J Holland 0-1, D Duggan 0-1, P Coleman 0-1.

11 October 2014 Semi-final	Castlemartyr	0-19 - 1-16	Cloughduv	Páirc Uí Rinn
	Brian Lawton 0-6, Barry Lawton 0-5, C Haines 0-3, S Hennessy 0-3, B Smiddy 0-2.		C Ryan 1-2, D Ring 0-5, S O'Connor 0-3, M Verling 0-2, D Corkery 0-2, J Lucey 0-1, B Ahern 0-1.

18 October 2014 Semi-final replay	Castlemartyr	2-14 - 0-15	Cloughduv	Páirc Uí Rinn
	Barry Lawton 0-8, Brian Lawton 0-4, C Haines 1-0, J Stack 1-0, D McAuliffe 0-1, Barra Ó Tuama 0-1.		C Ryan 0-11, S O'Connor 0-2, D Ring 0-2.

=== Final ===
26 October 2014 Final	Ballinhassig	0-10 - 0-18	Castlemartyr	Páirc Uí Chaoimh
	D Dineen 0-5, D Duggan 0-2, P Coleman 0-2, M Ahearne 0-1.		Barry Lawton 0-9, S Hennessy 0-2, Barra Ó Tuama 0-2, Brian Lawton 0-1, Brian Ó Tuama 0-1, J Stack 0-1, L Martin 0-1, D McAuliffe 0-1.

== Championship statistics ==
=== Top scorers ===
Rank	Player	Club	Tally	Total	Matches	Average
1	Barry Lawton	Castlemartyr	0-40	40	5	8.00
2	Cian Healy	Newcestown	1-16	19	2	9.50
3	Darragh Ring	Cloughduv	0-18	18	3	6.00
4	Colm Ryan	Cloughduv	1-13	16	2	8.00
4	Brian Lawton	Castlemartyr	1-13	16	5	3.20
6	Darren Dineen	Ballinhassig	0-14	14	2	7.00
7	Shane Crowley	Kilbrin	1-10	13	2	6.50
8	Stephen O'Reilly	Kilbrin	1-08	11	2	5.50
9	Cian Haines	Castlemartyr	2-03	9	4	2.25
10	Seán O'Connor	Cloughduv	0-07	7	3	2.33
