= 2020 Cork Junior A Hurling Championship =

- Dates: 3 October 2020 - 7 August 2021
- Teams: 7
- Sponsor: Co-Op Superstores
- Champions: Lisgoold (1st title); John Cronin (captain)
- Runners-up: Harbour Rovers; Thomas Condon (captain)

Tournament statistics
- Matches played: 6
- Goals scored: 19 (3.17 per match)
- Points scored: 190 (31.67 per match)
- Top scorer(s): Stephen Condon 1-23

The 2020 Cork Junior A Hurling Championship was the 123rd staging of the Cork Junior A Hurling Championship since its establishment by the Cork County Board in 1895. The championship began on 3 October 2020, however, it was suspended indefinitely due to the impact of the COVID-19 pandemic on Gaelic games. After being restarted the championship eventually ended on 7 August 2021.

On 7 August 2021, Lisgoold won the championship after a 2-19 to 0-16 win over Harbour Rovers in the final at Páirc Uí Rinn. This was their first ever championship title.

== Format change ==
The championship had featured 14 teams, comprising the divisional champions and runners-up, since 2017. Because of time constraints as a result of the ongoing COVID-19 pandemic it was decided to revert to the old system of allowing only the divisional champions take part.

== Qualification ==
Division	Championship	Champions
Avondhu	North Cork Junior A Hurling Championship	Harbour Rovers
Carbery	South West Junior A Hurling Championship	Clonakilty
Carrigdhoun	South East Junior A Hurling Championship	Kinsale
Duhallow	Duhallow Junior A Hurling Championship	Dromtarriffe
Imokilly	East Cork Junior A Hurling Championship	Lisgoold
Muskerry	Mid Cork Junior A Hurling Championship	Inniscarra
Seandún	City Junior A Hurling Championship	Brian Dillons

== Results ==
=== Bracket ===
Quarter-Finals
Brian Dillons (Seandún)	1–08
Dromtarriffe (Duhallow)	2–18
Lisgoold (Imokilly)	0–17
Inniscarra (Muskerry)	2–10
Clonakilty (Carbery)	2–18
Kinsale (Carrigdhoun)	1–12

Semi-Finals
Dromtarriffe (Duhallow)	2–17
Lisgoold (Imokilly)	3–16
Harbour Rovers (Avondhu)	3–19
Clonakilty (Carbery)	1–20

Final
Lisgoold (Imokilly)	2–19
Harbour Rovers (Avondhu)	0–16

=== Quarter-finals ===
3 October 2020 Quarter-final	Brian Dillons	1-08 - 2-18	Dromtarriffe	Ovens Sportsfield
	J Horgan 0-7 (0-5 f), A Murphy 1-0, C McCarthy 0-1.	Report	T Howard 1-6 (0-4 f), D O’Keeffe 1-0, C O’Callaghan, B Murphy 0-3 each, E Murphy, S Howard 0-2 each, J Murphy, S Cremin 0-1 each.	Referee: P Lyons (Bishoptown)

3 October 2020 Quarter-final	Clonakilty	2-18 - 1-12	Kinsale	Charlie Hurley Park
	T Anglin 2-0, D Lowney (0-2 f, 0-1 65), T O’Connell 0-3 each, T Clancy, E Ryan, S McEvoy, D Murphy 0-2 each, M Scally, C O’Donovan, D Shorten, B White 0-1 each.	Report	J O’Brien (1-0 pen, 0-4 f) 1-8, B Coughlan, S O’Brien 0-2 each.	Referee: B Barry-Murphy

3 October 2020 Quarter-final	Lisgoold	0-17 - 2-10	Inniscarra	Carraig na bhFear Sportsfield
	L O’Shea 0-11 (0-8 f) J O’Driscoll 0-2, C Hickey, D O’Brien, C O’Brien, J Cashman 0-1 each.	Report	A O’Mahony 0-5 (0-2 f, 0-1 65) D O’Connell 1-2, M Nagle 1-0, J Roche, P Holland and K Rice 0-1 each.	Referee: J Murphy

- Harbour Rovers received a bye in this round.

=== Semi-finals ===
31 July 2021 Semi-final	Harbour Rovers	3-19 - 1-20	Clonakilty	Éire Óg Sportsfield
	S Condon 1-11, S O'Riordan 0-4, E Sheehan 1-0, D Gallagher 1-0, P Hannon 0-2, J O'Sullivan 0-1, P Condon 0-1.		D Lowney 0-9, M White 1-1, T Clancy 0-3, S McEvoy 0-3, T O'Connor 0-2, S White 0-1, J McLoughlan 0-1.

31 July 2021 Semi-final	Dromtarriffe	2-17 - 3-16	Lisgoold	Mallow GAA Complex
	T Howard 1-6, D O'Keeffe 1-1, E Murphy 0-3, S Howard 0-3, J Murphy 0-2, C O'Callaghan 0-1, B Murphy 0-1.		J Cashman 0-9, C O'Brien 2-0, M Hegarty 1-1, D O'Brien 0-1, J Hegarty 0-1, C Hickey 0-1, J O'Driscoll 0-1, J Cronin 0-1, J Ryan 0-1.

=== Final ===
7 August 2021 Final	Lisgoold	2-19 - 0-16	Harbour Rovers	Páirc Uí Rinn
	J Ryan 1-3, M Hegarty 1-3 (0-2 sl), J Cashman 0-5 (0-4 f), D O’Brien 0-3, C Hickey 0-2, J O’Driscoll, C O’Brien, J Cronin 0-1 each.	Report	S Condon 0-12 (0-9 f), J O’Sullivan, P Hannon, D Pyne, S Dunne 0-1 each.	Referee: B Barry-Murphy (Aghabullogue)

== Championship statistics ==
=== Top scorers ===
Rank	Player	Club	Tally	Total	Matches	Average
1	Tomás Howard	Dromtarriffe	2-12	18	2	9.00
2	John Cashman	Lisgoold	0-15	15	3	5.00
3	Stephen Condon	Harbour Rovers	1-11	14	1	14.00
4	David Lowney	Clonakilty	0-12	12	2	6.00
5	Liam O'Shea	Lisgoold	0-11	12	2	5.50
6	John O'Brien	Kinsale	1-08	11	1	11.00
7	Mark Hegarty	Lisgoold	2-04	10	3	3.33
8	Cathal O'Brien	Lisgoold	2-02	8	3	2.66
9	Daniel O'Keeffe	Dromtarriffe	2-01	7	2	3.50
9	Jack Ryan	Lisgoold	1-04	7	3	2.33
9	John Horgan	Brian Dillons	0-07	7	1	7.00
