= 2008 Cork Junior A Hurling Championship =

- Dates: 20 September – 19 October 2008
- Teams: 7
- Sponsor: Evening Echo
- Champions: Dripsey (1st title); Diarmuid O'Riordan (captain); John Feeney (manager)
- Runners-up: Diarmuid Ó Mathúna's; Johnny Nyhan (captain); Christy O'Leary (manager)

Tournament statistics
- Matches played: 6
- Goals scored: 12 (2 per match)
- Points scored: 146 (24.33 per match)
- Top scorer(s): Diarmuid O'Riordan (1–26)

The 2008 Cork Junior A Hurling Championship was the 111th staging of the Cork Junior A Hurling Championship since its establishment by the Cork County Board in 1895. The championship ran from 20 September to 19 October 2008.

The final was played on 19 October 2008 at Páirc Uí Chaoimh in Cork, between Dripsey and Diarmuid Ó Mathúna's, in what was their first ever meeting in the final. Dripsey won the match by 0–13 to 1–07 to claim their first ever championship title.

Dripsey's Diarmuid O'Riordan was the championship's top scorer with 1–26.

== Qualification ==
Division	Championship	Champions
Avondhu	North Cork Junior A Hurling Championship	Charleville
Carbery	South West Junior A Hurling Championship	Diarmuid Ó Mathúna's
Carrigdhoun	South East Junior A Hurling Championship	Ballymartle
Duhallow	Duhallow Junior A Hurling Championship	Tullylease
Imokilly	East Cork Junior A Hurling Championship	Carrignavar
Muskerry	Mid Cork Junior A Hurling Championship	Dripsey
Seandún	City Junior A Hurling Championship	Glen Rovers

== Results ==
=== First round ===
20 September 2008 First round	Tullylease	0-17 - 1-12	Charleville	Kanturk
	S Whelan 0-13, B Sheehy 0-2, S Stokes 0-1, S Hehir 0-1.		M Gammell 1-2, P Gammell 0-3, J Quinlan 0-3, B Dennehy 0-1, B Barrett 0-1, A O'Connor 0-1, D O'Flynn 0-1.

21 September 2008 First round	Carrignavar	1-20 - 1-06	Ballymartle	Páirc Uí Rinn
	A Hegarty 0-7, M Geaney 1-0, C Burns 0-3, P Murphy 0-3, M Hickey 0-2, A Sheehan 0-2, T Geaney 0-1, R Spillane 0-1, B Hegarty 0-1.		B Dwyer 1-2, J Coleman 0-2, K Hallissey 0-1, S Fehilly 0-1.

5 October 2008 First round	Dripsey	1-14 - 1-12	Glen Rovers	Ballincollig
	D O'Riordan 1-8, M O'Sullivan 0-2, J Carey 0-2, D Foley 0-1, D O'Sullivan 0-1.		R Brosnan 1-0, S McGrath 0-3, S O'Neill 0-3, D O'Callaghan 0-2, K McCarthy 0-2, J Goggin 0-1, A Dunlea 0-1.

=== Semi-finals ===
5 October 2008 Semi-final	Diarmuid Ó Mathúna's	3-12 - 2-12	Tullylease	Páirc Uí Rinn
	JP O'Callaghan 2-6, S Crowley 1-0, M Fehilly 0-3, T Lordan 0-2, P Crowley 0-1.		S Hehir 2-2, S Whelan 0-6, E Sheehy 0-2, P Newman 0-1, S Stokes 0-1.

12 October 2008 Semi-final	Dripsey	1-12 - 0-09	Carrignavar	Páirc Uí Rinn
	D O'Riordan 0-7, M O'Sullivan 1-2, D O'Sullivan 0-2, J O'Riordan 0-1.		C Burns 0-5, P Murphy 0-1, M Hickey 0-1, B Murphy 0-1, B Hegarty 0-1.

=== Final ===
19 October 2008 Final	Dripsey	0-13 - 1-07	Diarmuid Ó Mathúna's	Páirc Uí Chaoimh
	D O'Riordan 0-11, C Hayes 0-1, D Foley 0-1.		JP O'Callaghan 0-5, T Lordan 1-0, M Fehily 0-1, M Barrett 0-1.

== Championship statistics ==
=== Top scorers ===
Rank	Player	Club	Tally	Total	Matches	Average
1	Diarmuid O'Riordan	Dripsey	1-26	29	3	9.66
2	Séamus Whelan	Tullylease	0-19	19	2	9.50
3	John Paul O'Callaghan	Diarmuid Ó Mathúna's	2-11	17	2	8.50
4	Shane Hehir	Tullylease	2-03	9	2	4.50
5	Con Burns	Carrignavar	0-08	8	2	4.00
