= 1910 Cork Junior Hurling Championship =

Irish hurling competition

- Champions: Blackrock (3rd title)
- Runners-up: Cloughduv

The 1910 Cork Junior Hurling Championship was the 16th staging of the Cork Junior Hurling Championship since its establishment by the Cork County Board in 1895.

The final was played on 25 September 1910 at the Athletic Grounds in Ballincollig, between Blackrock and Cloughduv, in what was their first ever meeting in the final. Blackrock won the match by 10-04 to 1-01 to claim their third championship title overall and a first championship title in nine years.

== Results ==
=== Final ===
25 September 1910 Final	Blackrock	10-04 - 1-01	Cloughduv	Ballincollig Athletic Grounds
