= 1964 Cork Junior Hurling Championship =

Irish hurling competition

- Dates: 18 October – 6 December 1964
- Teams: 7
- Champions: Castlemartyr (2nd title)
- Runners-up: Cloughduv

Tournament statistics
- Matches played: 6
- Goals scored: 38 (6.33 per match)
- Points scored: 80 (13.33 per match)

The 1964 Cork Junior Hurling Championship was the 67th staging of the Cork Junior Hurling Championship since its establishment by the Cork County Board in 1895. The championship ran from 18 October to 6 December 1964.

The final was played on 6 December 1964 at the Athletic Grounds in Cork, between Castlemartyr and Cloughduv, in what was their second meeting in the final overall and a first meeting in the final in 13 years. Castlemartyr won the match by 4-05 to 2-09 to claim their second championship title overall and a first championship title in 13 years.

== Results ==
=== Quarter-finals ===
18 October 1964 Quarter-final	Ballinhassig	2-09 - 3-02	Nemo Rangers	Carrigaline Grounds

18 October 1964 Quarter-final	Castlemartyr	4-14 - 1-01	Courcey Rovers	Cork Athletic Grounds

25 October 1964 Quarter-final	Fermoy	3-09 - 2-07	Newmarket	Bishop Casey Memorial Park

- Cloughduv received a bye in this round.

=== Semi-finals ===
1 November 1964 Semi-final	Castlemartyr	6-04 - 5-06	Ballinhassig	Cork Athletic Grounds

8 November 1964 Semi-final	Cloughduv	3-08 - 3-06	Fermoy	Cork Athletic Grounds

=== Final ===
6 December 1964 Final	Castlemartyr	4-05 - 2-09	Cloughduv	Cork Athletic Grounds
	J Abernethy 2-1, D O'Keeffe 2-0, N Dowling 0-2, D Barry 0-1, J O'Keeffe 0-1.		J Long 1-3, T Kelly 1-2, J Nash 0-2, D McCarthy 0-1, T O'Mahony 0-1.
