= 1986 Cork Junior A Hurling Championship =

- Dates: 14 September – 26 October 1986
- Teams: 7
- Champions: Ballymartle (3rd title); Edward McCarthy (captain)
- Runners-up: Meelin; John Browne (captain)

Tournament statistics
- Matches played: 8
- Goals scored: 25 (3.13 per match)
- Points scored: 157 (19.63 per match)
- Top scorer(s): George Healy (2-14)

The 1986 Cork Junior A Hurling Championship was the 89th staging of the Cork Junior A Hurling Championship since its establishment by the Cork County Board. The championship ran from 14 September to 26 October 1986.

The final was played on 26 October 1986 at the Aghabullogue Grounds in Coachford, between Ballymartle and Meelin, in what was their first ever meeting in the final. Ballymartle won the match by 3-08 to 2-04 to claim their third championship title overall and a first title in 28 years.

Delany Rovers's George Healy was the championship's top scorer with 2-14.

== Qualification ==
Division	Championship	Champions
Avondhu	North Cork Junior A Hurling Championship	Rathluirc
Carbery	South West Junior A Hurling Championship	Barryroe
Carrigdhoun	South East Junior A Hurling Championship	Ballymartle
Duhallow	Duhallow Junior A Hurling Championship	Meelin
Imokilly	East Cork Junior A Hurling Championship	Cloyne
Muskerry	Mid Cork Junior A Hurling Championship	Aghabullogue
Seandún	City Junior A Hurling Championship	Delany Rovers

== Results ==
=== Quarter-finals ===
14 September 1986 Quarter-final	Barryroe	1-08 - 1-08	Rathluirc	Páirc Uí Chaoimh
	D Philpott 1-1, D Madden 0-2, D McCarthy 0-2, T Tobin 0-2, P Tobin 0-1.		K O'Shea 0-5, D Daly 1-0, P Herbert 0-1, P O'Shea 0-1, J Dennehy 0-1.

14 September 1986 Quarter-final	Delany Rovers	2-08 - 1-11	Aghabullogue	Blarney Grounds
	G Healy 1-5, G Murphy 1-0, M McElhinney 0-1, T Callanan 0-1, M Morrissey 0-1.		S Noonan 0-9, M Healy 1-0, G Lynch 0-1, MP Buckley 0-1.

28 September 1986 Quarter-final	Ballymartle	2-16 - 2-07	Cloyne	Páirc Uí Chaoimh
	M Fitzpatrick 0-8, J Webb 1-1, J McCarthy 0-4, K McCarthy 1-0, T Allen 0-2, J O'Mahony 0-1.		J Lewis 0-5, P Cahill 1-0, N Horgan 1-0, D O'Shea 0-1, P O'Shea 0-1.

28 September 1986 Quarter-final replay	Delany Rovers	2-10 - 2-08	Aghabullogue	Blarney Grounds
	G Healy 1-4, E Murphy 1-1, E Healy 0-3, M McElhinney 0-1, L Foley 0-1.		S Noonan 0-4, M Healy 1-0, V Coakley 1-0, MP Buckley 0-3, D Walsh 0-1.

5 October 1986 Quarter-final replay	Barryroe	1-17 - 2-07	Rathluirc	Páirc Uí Chaoimh
	D Madden 1-2, N Tobin 0-5, B Whelton 0-5, D Dwyer 0-2, D Philpott 0-2, M Moloney 0-1.		P O'Shea 1-1, J O'Callaghan 1-0, D Kavanagh 0-2, J Foley 0-1, K O'Shea 0-1, P Herbert 0-1, R Butler 0-1.

=== Semi-finals ===
12 October 1986 Semi-final	Meelin	3-07 - 0-11	Delany Rovers	Banteer Sportsfield
	P O'Connor 1-2, J Browne 1-1, J Brosnan 1-0, B O'Connor 0-2, D Fitzpatrick 0-1, N Brosnan 0-1.		G Healy 0-5, E Healy 0-3, M McElhinney 0-1, P Cummins 0-1, E Murphy 0-1.

12 October 1986 Semi-final	Ballymartle	0-17 - 1-10	Barryroe	Páirc Uí Riagáin
	M Fitzpatrick 0-5, K McCarthy 0-4, J McCarthy 0-3, J O'Mahony 0-3, T Allen 0-1, J Webb 0-1.		D Madden 1-1, B Whelton 0-3, N Tobin 0-2, T Hurley 0-1, D McCarthy 0-1, D Dwyer 0-1, L Murphy 0-1.

=== Final ===
26 October 1986 Final	Ballymartle	3-08 - 2-04	Meelin	Coachford Sportsfield
	K McCarthy 1-2, M Fitzpatrick 0-4, J Webb 1-0, B Coleman 1-0, T Allen 0-2.		B O'Connor 1-1, D Fitzpatrick 1-0, N Brosnan 0-1, J O'Sullivan 0-1, T Brosnan 0-1.	Referee: P Spillane (Carrigtwohill)

== Championship statistics ==
=== Top scorers ===
Overall

Rank	Player	County	Tally	Total	Matches	Average
1	George Healy	Delany Rovers	2-14	20	3	6.66
2	Martin Fitzpatrick	Ballymartle	0-17	17	3	5.66
3	Seánie Noonan	Aghabullogue	0-13	13	2	6.50
4	Kevin McCarthy	Ballymartle	2-06	12	3	4.00
5	Derry Madden	Barryroe	2-05	11	3	3.66

In a single game

Rank	Player	Club	Tally	Total	Opposition
1	Seánie Noonan	Aghabullogue	0-09	9	Delany Rovers
2	George Healy	Delany Rovers	1-05	8	Aghabullogue
2	Martin Fitzpatrick	Ballymartle	0-08	8	Cloyne
4	George Healy	Delany Rovers	1-04	7	Aghabullogue
5	Derry Madden	Barryroe	1-02	5	Rathluirc
5	Pat O'Connor	Meelin	1-02	5	Delany Rovers
5	Kevin McCarthy	Ballymartle	1-02	5	Meelin
5	Kevin O'Shea	Rathluirc	0-05	5	Barryroe
5	Joe Lewis	Cloyne	0-05	5	Ballymartle
5	Neil Tobin	Barryroe	0-05	5	Rathluirc
5	Batt Whelton	Barryroe	0-05	5	Rathluirc
5	George Healy	Delany Rovers	0-05	5	Meelin
5	Martin Fitzpatrick	Ballymartle	0-05	5	Barryroe
