= 1931 Cork Junior Hurling Championship =

Irish hurling competition

- Dates: 13 September – 9 November 1931
- Teams: 6
- Champions: Blackrock (4th title); E. Cotter (captain)
- Runners-up: Skibberreen; J. O'Donovan (captain)

Tournament statistics
- Matches played: 6
- Goals scored: 31 (5.17 per match)
- Points scored: 26 (4.33 per match)

The 1931 Cork Junior Hurling Championship was the 35th staging of the Cork Junior Hurling Championship since its establishment by the Cork County Board in 1895. The championship ran from 13 September to 9 November 1931.

The final was played on 9 November 1931 at the Town Park Grounds in Clonakilty, between Blackrock and Skibberreen, in what was their first and only meeting in the final. Blackrock won the match by 3-07 to 1-01 to claim their fourth championship title overall and a first championship title in 21 years.

== Qualification ==
Division	Championship	Representative	#
Avondhu	North Cork Junior Hurling Championship	Shanballymore	
Carbery	South West Junior Hurling Championship	Skibberreen	
Carrigdhoun	South East Junior Hurling Championship	Passage	
Imokilly	East Cork Junior Hurling Championship	Bride Rovers	
Muskerry	Mid Cork Junior Hurling Championship	Blarney	
Seandún	Cork City Junior Hurling Championship	Blackrock	

== Results ==
=== Quarter-finals ===
13 September 1931 Quarter-final	Passage	6-01 - 2-00	Bride Rovers	Cork Athletic Grounds

27 September 1931 Quarter-final	Blackrock	3-04 - 3-03	Blarney	Ballincollig Athletic Grounds

=== Semi-finals ===
20 September 1931 Semi-final	Skibberreen	3-02 - 2-03	Shanballymore	Cork Athletic Grounds

18 October 1931 Semi-final	Blackrock	6-03 - 2-02	Passage	Rochestown Athletic Grounds

=== Final ===
9 November 1931 Final	Blackrock	3-07 - 1-01	Skibberreen	Clonakilty Town Park Grounds
