= 2011 Cork Junior A Hurling Championship =

- Dates: 17 September – 30 October 2011
- Teams: 7
- Sponsor: Evening Echo
- Champions: Charleville (1st title); Daniel O'Flynn (captain); T. J. Crowley (manager)
- Runners-up: Mayfield; Dan Lucey (captain); John Boylan (manager)

Tournament statistics
- Matches played: 8
- Goals scored: 23 (2.88 per match)
- Points scored: 194 (24.25 per match)
- Top scorer(s): James O'Brien (4-15)

The 2011 Cork Junior A Hurling Championship was the 114th staging of the Cork Junior A Hurling Championship since its establishment by the Cork County Board in 1895. The championship began on 17 September 2011 and ended on 30 October 2011.

On 30 October 2011, Charleville won the championship following a 2-10 to 0-11 defeat of Mayfield in the final at Páirc Uí Rinn. This was their first championship title in the grade.

Charleville's James O'Brien was the championship's top scorer with 4-15.

== Qualification ==
Division	Championship	Champions
Avondhu	North Cork Junior A Hurling Championship	Charleville
Carbery	South West Junior A Hurling Championship	St. Oliver Plunketts
Carrigdhoun	South East Junior A Hurling Championship	Ballinhassig
Duhallow	Duhallow Junior A Hurling Championship	Kilbrin
Imokilly	East Cork Junior A Hurling Championship	Dungourney
Muskerry	Mid Cork Junior A Hurling Championship	Cloughduv
Seandún	City Junior A Hurling Championship	Mayfield

== Results ==
=== First round ===
17 September 2011 First round	St. Oliver Plunketts	2-16 - 3-13	Kilbrin	Coachford Sportsfield
	K Coffey 0-12, B Walsh 1-2, C McCarthy 1-1, MP Keohane 0-1.		W Egan 1-3, L Daly 0-6, K Sheehan 1-1, T O'Reilly 1-0, D O'Sullivan 0-1, D Crowley 0-1, N O'Reilly 0-1.

24 September 2011 First round	Mayfield	1-17 - 1-09	Cloughduv	Ballyanly
	D Lucey 0-6, P Duggan 1-1, N Kelly 0-3, I Looney 0-2, T Lotty 0-1, M Barry 0-1, C Brosnan 0-1, K Punch 0-1, D O'Gorman 0-1.		D Ring 1-5, B Ahern 0-2, D Kelly 0-1, D O'Leary 0-1.

25 September 2011 First round	Charleville	2-21 - 0-06	Ballinahssig	Mallow GAA Complex
	J O'Brien 2-3, A Cagney 0-5, M Gammell 0-4, D Murphy 0-3, M Kavanagh 0-2, D O'Flynn 0-1, B Dennehy 0-1, A O'Connor 0-1, J Casey 0-1.		K O'Sullivan 0-4, J Finn 0-2.

1 October 2011 First round replay	St. Oliver Plunketts	2-12 - 3-11	Kilbrin	Coachford Sportsfield
	K Coffey 0-7, C McCarthy 1-2, D Walsh 1-0, M Higgins 0-2, B Walsh 0-1.		L Daly 1-3, T O'Reilly 1-1, D Crowley 1-1, W Egan 0-4, K Sheehan 0-1, Daniel O'Sullivan 0-1.

=== Semi-finals ===
8 October 2011 Semi-final	Kilbrin	0-12 - 2-17	Charleville	Fr. Con Buckley Park
	L Daly 0-5, T O'Reilly 0-2, K Sheehan 0-2, P Egan 0-1, D Crowley 0-1, D O'Sullivan 0-1.		J O'Brien 1-5, A Cagney 1-2, M Gammell 0-4, D O'Flynn 0-3, D O'Sullivan 0-1, A O'Connor 0-1, F O'Callaghan 0-1.

8 October 2011 Semi-final	Dungourney	0-15 - 3-12	Mayfield	Páirc Uí Chaoimh
	S Casey 0-8, S Hegarty 0-3, K Kelleher 0-3, N Motherway 0-1.		P Duggan 2-2, N Kelly 0-6, T Lotty 1-1, S Kelly 0-2, I Looney 0-1.

=== Final ===
23 October 2011 Final	Charleville	0-09 - 2-03	Mayfield	Páirc Uí Rinn
	M Gammell 0-4, D O'Flynn 0-2, J O'Brien 0-2, M Kavanagh 0-1.		T Lotty 1-1, D Buckley 1-0, N Kelly 0-1, I Looney 0-1.

30 October 2011 Final replay	Charleville	2-10 - 0-11	Mayfield	Páirc Uí Rinn
	J O'Brien 1-5, A Cagney 1-1, M Gammell 0-3, D O'Flynn 0-1.		I Looney 0-3, N Kelly 0-3, T Lotty 0-2, S Kelly 0-2, M Barry 0-1.

== Championship statistics ==
=== Top scorers ===
Rank	Player	Club	Tally	Total	Matches	Average
1	James O'Brien	Charleville	4-15	27	4	6.75
2	Kevin Coffey	St Olivers Plunkett's	0-19	19	2	9.50
3	Liam Daly	Kilbrin	1-14	17	3	5.66
4	Mervyn Gammell	Charleville	0-15	15	4	3.75
5	Andrew Cagney	Charleville	2-08	14	4	3.50
6	Nicky Kelly	Mayfield	0-13	13	4	3.24
7	Patrick Duggan	Mayfield	3-03	12	4	3.00
8	Terry Lotty	Mayfield	2-05	11	4	2.75
9	William Egan	Kilbrin	1-07	10	3	3.33
10	Conor McCarthy	St Olivers Plunkett's	2-03	9	2	4.50
