= 1906 Cork Junior Hurling Championship =

Irish hurling competition

- Champions: Passage (2nd title)
- Runners-up: Redmonds

The 1906 Cork Junior Hurling Championship was the 12th staging of the Cork Junior Hurling Championship since its establishment by the Cork County Board in 1895.

Passage won the championship title for the second consecutive year.
