= 2010 Cork Junior A Hurling Championship =

- Dates: 10 September – 31 October 2010
- Teams: 7
- Sponsor: Evening Echo
- Champions: Meelin (1st title); Jerry Forrest (captain); Liam Ryan (manager)
- Runners-up: Cloughduv; Pat Dunlea (captain); Jimmy Barry-Murphy (manager)

Tournament statistics
- Matches played: 6
- Goals scored: 11 (1.83 per match)
- Points scored: 152 (25.33 per match)
- Top scorer(s): Éamonn Brosnan (1-19)

The 2010 Cork Junior Hurling Championship was the 113th staging of the Cork Junior A Hurling Championship since its establishment by the Cork County Board in 1895. The championship ran from 10 September to 31 October 2010.

The final was played on 31 October 2010 at Páirc Uí Rinn in Cork, between Meelin and Cloughduv, in what was their first ever meeting in the final. Meelin won the match by 1–19 to 2–09 to claim their first ever championship title.

Meelin's Éamonn Brosnan was the championship's top scorer with 1-19.

== Qualification ==
Division	Championship	Champions
Avondhu	North Cork Junior A Hurling Championship	Buttevant
Carbery	South West Junior A Hurling Championship	Diarmuid Ó Mathúna's
Carrigdhoun	South East Junior A Hurling Championship	Ballymartle
Duhallow	Duhallow Junior A Hurling Championship	Meelin
Imokilly	East Cork Junior A Hurling Championship	Castlemartyr
Muskerry	Mid Cork Junior A Hurling Championship	Cloughduv
Seandún	City Junior A Hurling Championship	Mayfield

== Results ==
=== First round ===
10 September 2010 First round	Mayfield	1-20 - 0-08	Ballymartle	Páirc Uí Rinn
	D Buckley 1-2, S Kelly 0-4, N Kelly 0-4, T Lotty 0-3, C Brosnan 0-3, P Duggan 0-2, I looney 0-1, G Lehane 0-1.		J Coleman 0-3, B Higgins 0-2, M O'Mahony 0-2, B Coleman 0-1.

24 September 2010 First round	Buttevant	0-13 - 1-11	Castlemartyr	Páirc Uí Rinn
	J Mulchinock 0-6, B Daly 0-3, S Stack 0-2, D O'Connell 0-1, J O'Keeffe 0-1.		J Smiddy 0-5, E O'Keeffe 1-0, Barry Lawton 0-3, S Hennessy 0-1, D O'Keeffe 0-1, Brian Lawton 0-1.

26 September 2010 First round	Meelin	2-17 - 0-11	Diarmuid Ó Mathúna's	Coachford Sportsfield
	E Brosnan 1-5, DJ O'Sullivan 1-2, L Collins 0-2, TJ Brosnan 0-2, J Curtin 0-2, S O'Riordan 0-1, C Murphy 0-1, W Buckley 0-1, B O'Sullivan 0-1.		JP O'Callaghan 0-8, T Lordan 0-1, S Crowley 0-1, D Coughlan 0-1.

=== Semi-finals ===
3 October 2010 Semi-final	Mayfield	1-10 - 2-11	Meelin	Coachford Sportsfield
	S Kelly 0-7, D Lucey 1-0, D Buckley 0-2, I Looney 0-1.		B O'Sullivan 1-1, L Collins 1-1, E Brosnan 0-3, J Curtin 0-2, W Murphy 0-2, J Forrest 0-1, DJ O'Sullivan 0-1.

3 October 2010 Semi-final	Castlemartyr	0-12 - 1-11	Cloughduv	Páirc Uí Rinn
	J Smiddy 0-5, Barry Lawton 0-2, E Clifford 0-2, M Bowens 0-1, A Bowse 0-1, Brian Lawton 0-1.		T O'Mahony 1-1, D Ring 0-2, D Crowley 0-2, C Dunne 0-2, D Murphy 0-1, P Dunlea 0-1, B Ahern 0-1, A Cronin 0-1.

=== Final ===
31 October 2010 Final	Meelin	1-19 - 2-09	Cloughduv	Páirc Uí Rinn
	E Brosnan 0-11, DJ O'Sullivan 1-0, S O'Riordan 0-3, J Forrest 0-2, W Murphy 0-1, L Collins 0-1, B O'Sullivan 0-1.		D Ring 0-7, B Ahern 1-0, D Murphy 1-0, T O'Mahony 0-1, D Corkery 0-1.

== Championship statistics ==
=== Top scorers ===
Rank	Player	Club	Tally	Total	Matches	Average
1	Éamonn Brosnan	Meelin	1-19	22	3	7.33
2	Shane Kelly	Mayfield	0-11	11	2	5.50
3	Jimmy Smiddy	Castlemartyr	0-10	10	2	5.00
4	D. J. O'Sullivan	Meelin	2-03	9	3	3.00
4	Darragh Ring	Cloughduv	0-09	9	2	4.50
6	J. P. O'Callaghan	Diarmuid Ó Mathúna's	0-08	8	1	8.00
7	Denis Buckley	Mayfield	1-04	7	2	3.50
7	Liam Collins	Meelin	1-04	7	3	2.33
9	Brendan O'Sullivan	Meelin	1-03	6	3	2.00
9	John Mulchinock	Buttevant	0-06	6	1	6.00
