= 1933 Cork Junior Hurling Championship =

Irish hurling competition

- Champions: Kinsale (2nd title); T. O'Connell (captain)
- Runners-up: Skibberreen

The 1933 Cork Junior Hurling Championship was the 37th staging of the Cork Junior Hurling Championship since its establishment by the Cork County Board in 1895.

The final was played on 19 November 1933 at the Town Park Grounds in Clonakilty, between Kinsale and Skibberreen, in what was their first and only meeting in the final. Kinsale won the match by 5-04 to 0-01 to claim their second championship title overall and a first championship title in 15 years.

== Results ==
=== Quarter-finals ===
1 October 1933 Quarter-final	Kinsale	8-07 - 2-04	Millstreet	The Mardyke

8 October 1933 Quarter-final	Milford	w/o - scr.	Cloughduv	Millstreet Athletic Grounds

=== Semi-finals ===
26 October 1933 Semi-final	Skibberreen	7-05 - 1-03	Milford	The Mardyke

5 November 1933 Semi-final	Kinsale	7-02 - 7-01	St Mary's	Passage Athletic Grounds

=== Final ===
19 November 1933 Final	Kinsale	5-04 - 0-01	Skibberreen	Clonakilty Town Park Grounds
