= 1945 Cork Junior Hurling Championship =

Irish hurling competition

- Teams: 7
- Champions: Midleton (2nd title)
- Runners-up: Passage

The 1945 Cork Junior Hurling Championship was the 48th staging of the Cork Junior Hurling Championship since its establishment by the Cork County Board in 1895.

The final was played on 16 December 1945 at the Athletic Grounds in Cork, between Midleton and Passage, in what was their first ever meeting in the final. Midleton won the match by 3-06 to 3-03 to claim their second championship title overall and a first championship title in 28 years.

== Results ==
=== Final ===
16 December 1945 Final	Midleton	3-06 - 3-03	Passage	Cork Athletic Grounds
