= 1991 Cork Junior A Hurling Championship =

- Dates: 8 September – 10 November 1991
- Teams: 7
- Champions: Aghabullogue (1st title); Kevin Barry-Murphy (captain)
- Runners-up: Aghada

Tournament statistics
- Matches played: 8
- Goals scored: 27 (3.38 per match)
- Points scored: 178 (22.25 per match)
- Top scorer(s): Joe Healy (7-20)

The 1991 Cork Junior A Hurling Championship was the 94th staging of the Cork Junior A Hurling Championship since its establishment by the Cork County Board. The draw for the opening fixtures took place on 16 December 1990. The championship ran from 8 September to 10 November 1991.

The final replay was played on 10 November 1991 at Páirc Uí Chaoimh in Cork between Aghabullogue and Aghada, in what was their first ever meeting in the final. Aghabullogue won the match by 1-13 to 1-09 to claim their first ever championship title.

Aghabullogue's Joe Healy was the championship's top scorer with 7-20.

== Qualification ==
Division	Championship	Champions
Avondhu	North Cork Junior A Hurling Championship	Kilworth
Carbery	South West Junior A Hurling Championship	Newcestown
Carrigdhoun	South East Junior A Hurling Championship	Ballinhassig
Duhallow	Duhallow Junior A Hurling Championship	Meelin
Imokilly	East Cork Junior A Hurling Championship	Aghada
Muskerry	Mid Cork Junior A Hurling Championship	Aghabullogue
Seandún	City Junior A Hurling Championship	Nemo Rangers

== Results ==
=== Quarter-finals ===
8 September 1991 Quarter-final	Aghabullogue	4-11 - 0-10	Nemo Rangers	Páirc Liam Mhic Cárthaigh
	J Healy 3-5, P Martin 1-3, N Looney 0-1, G Lynch 0-1, T Tarrant 0-1.		B Allen 0-4, J Coogan 0-2, D Creedon 0-1, P Dorgan 0-1, A Horgan 0-1, C Titley 0-1.	Referee: P O'Neill (Shamrocks)

22 September 1991 Quarter-final	Aghada	2-11 - 0-12	Meelin	Páirc Uí Chaoimh
	C Counihan 2-0, M Lewis 0-4, R Lewis 0-3, P Cashman 0-2, D Morrissey 0-1, R Dwane 0-1.		N Brosnan 0-7, T O'Mahony 0-3, J Brosnan 0-2.

29 September 1991 Quarter-final	Newcestown	2-12 - 3-09	Ballinhassig	Charlie Hurley Park
	B White 2-0, D Long 0-4, P Kenneally 0-4, E Kenneally 0-2, M O'Mahony 0-1, J O'Sullivan 0-1.		S McCarthy 0-5, D Lombard 1-1, Damien McCarthy 1-1, P Cussen 1-0, Drew McCarthy 0-1, Denis McCarthy 0-1.

6 October 1991 Quarter-final	Newcestown	3-20 - 2-22 (aet)	Ballinhassig	Charlie Hurley Park
	E Desmond 2-1, P Kenneally 0-6, D Long 0-4, S Lordan 1-0, E Kenneally 0-3, P Crowley 0-2, M O'Mahony 0-2, G Smith 0-1, J O'Sullivan 0-1.		S McCarthy 0-10, P Brennan 1-3, G Holland 1-0, Damien McCarthy 0-3, D Healy 0-2, Drew McCarthy 0-2, D Lombard 0-1, Denis McCarthy 0-1.

- Kilworth received a bye in this round.

=== Semi-finals ===
6 October 1991 Semi-final	Aghada	4-09 - 0-05	Kilworth	Felix Sarsfield Memorial Park
	J Murphy 2-1, R Lewis 0-5, P Cashman 1-1, M Lewis 1-0, C Counihan 0-2.		P Greehy 0-3, S Keane 0-1, A Kenny 0-1.

20 October 1991 Semi-final	Aghabullogue	3-03 - 0-08	Newcestown	Cloughduv Grounds
	J Healy 2-2, T Ó Murchú 1-0, K Barry-Murphy 0-1.		P Kenneally 0-4, D Long 0-2, G Smith 0-1, E Kenneally 0-1.

=== Final ===
3 November 1991 Final	Aghabulloue	1-12 - 1-12	Aghada	Páirc Uí Chaoimh
	J Healy 1-5, K Barry-Murphy 0-3, D O'Connell 0-3, P Martin 0-1.		R Lewis 1-6, P Cashman 0-3, M Lewis 0-1, R Dwane 0-1, K O'Keeffe 0-1.	Referee: P O'Neill (Shamrocks)

10 November 1991 Final replay	Aghabullogue	1-13 - 1-09	Aghada	Páirc Uí Chaoimh
	J Healy 1-8, N Looney 0-2, K Barry-Murphy 0-1, G Lynch 0-1, D O'Connell 0-1.		D Creedon 1-0, R Lewis 0-3, M Lewis 0-2, R Dwane 0-1, D Morrissey 0-1, K O'Keeffe 0-1, C Counihan 0-1.	Referee: P O'Neill (Shamrocks)

== Championship statistics ==
=== Top scorers ===
Overall

Rank	Player	Club	Tally	Total	Matches	Average
1	Joe Healy	Aghabullogue	7-20	41	4	10.25
2	Richie Lewis	Aghada	1-17	20	4	5.00
3	Seán McCarthy	Ballinhassig	0-15	15	2	7.50
4	Pat Kenneally	Newcestown	0-14	14	3	4.66
5	Mickey Lewis	Aghada	0-10	10	4	2.50

In a single game

Rank	Player	Club	Tally	Total	Opposition
1	Joe Healy	Aghabullogue	3-05	14	Nemo Rangers
2	Joe Healy	Aghabullogue	1-08	11	Aghada
3	Seán McCarthy	Ballinhassig	0-10	10	Newcestown
4	Richie Lewis	Aghada	1-06	9	Aghabullogue
5	Joe Healy	Aghabullogue	2-02	8	Newcestown
5	Joe Healy	Aghabullogue	1-05	8	Aghada
7	Eugene Desmond	Newcestown	2-01	7	Ballinhassig
7	John Murphy	Aghada	2-01	7	Kilworth
7	Ned Brosnan	Meelin	0-07	7	Aghada
10	Conor Counihan	Aghada	2-00	6	Meelin
10	Barry White	Newcestown	2-00	6	Ballinhassig
10	Paddy Martin	Aghabullogue	1-03	6	Nemo Rangers
10	Peter Brennan	Ballinhassig	1-03	6	Newcestown
10	Pat Kenneally	Newcestown	0-06	6	Ballinhassig
