= 2002 Cork Junior A Hurling Championship =

- Dates: 28 September – 17 November 2002
- Teams: 7
- Sponsor: TSB Bank
- Champions: Ballinhassig (3rd title); James Aherne (captain); Seánie McCarthy (manager)
- Runners-up: Fr O'Neill's; Ray O'Neill (captain)

Tournament statistics
- Matches played: 7
- Goals scored: 29 (4.14 per match)
- Points scored: 142 (20.29 per match)
- Top scorer(s): Luke Swayne (4–16)

The 2002 Cork Junior A Hurling Championship was the 105th staging of the Cork Junior A Hurling Championship since its establishment by the Cork County Board in 1895. The championship ran from 28 September to 17 November 2002.

The final was played on 17 November 2002 at Páirc Uí Chaoimh in Cork, between Ballinhassig and Fr O'Neill's, in what was their first ever meeting in the final. Ballinhassig won the match by 2–12 to 3–07 to claim their third championship title overall and a first title in 29 years.

Luke Swayne was the championship's top scorer with 4–16.

== Qualification ==
Division	Championship	Champions
Avondhu	North Cork Junior A Hurling Championship	Charleville
Carbery	South West Junior A Hurling Championship	Diarmuid Ó Mathúna's
Carrigdhoun	South East Junior A Hurling Championship	Ballinhassig
Duhallow	Duhallow Junior A Hurling Championship	Kanturk
Imokilly	East Cork Junior A Hurling Championship	Fr O'Neill's
Muskerry	Mid Cork Junior A Hurling Championship	Cloughduv
Seandún	City Junior A Hurling Championship	Mayfield

== Results ==
=== First round ===
28 September 2002 First round	Diarmuid Ó Mathúna's	3-20 - 0-07	Kanturk	Inniscarra
	B Nyhan 2-3, JP O'Callaghan 1-6, G McCarthy 0-5, C O'Leary 0-2, M Fehilly 0-1, J O'Sullivan 0-1, S Coughlan 0-1, J Dineen 0-1.		F Browne 0-4, J O'Connell 0-1, E Ahern 0-1, J Walsh 0-1.

29 September 2002 First round	Fr. O'Neill's	1-15 - 3-07	Cloughduv	Páirc Uí Rinn
	M Broderick 1-1, L Swayne 0-4, J Holland 0-3, E Holland 0-3, A Brett 0-2, E Conway 0-1, M Holland 0-1.		J Shanahan 1-3, T Twomey 1-2, D O'Leary 1-0, T Barry-Murphy 0-1, T O'Mahony 0-1.

5 October 2002 First round	Ballinhassig	4-11 - 1-12	Charleville	Mallow
	D Duggan 2-1, D O'Sullivan 0-5, T Coleman 1-1, M Coleman 1-0, J Holland 0-1, D Dineen 0-1, D McCarthy 0-1, J Aherne 0-1.		J Quinlan 0-7, PJ Copps 1-0, M Gammell 0-3, P Gammell 0-1, B Foley 0-1.

=== Semi-finals ===
20 October 2002 Semi-final	Ballinhassig	4-08 - 1-04	Mayfield	Páirc Uí Chaoimh
	D McCarthy 2-0, D O'Sullivan 0-5, S Dineen 1-1, D Duggan 1-0, D Dineen 0-1, J Aherne 0-1.		D Lucey 1-4.

20 October 2002 Semi-final	Fr. O'Neill's	1-06 - 1-06	Diarmuid Ó Mathúna's	Páirc Uí Chaoimh
	L Swayne 1-2, E Holland 0-2, A Brett 0-1, E Conway 0-1.		G O'Sullivan 1-2, G McCarthy 0-3, S Coughlan 0-1.

3 November 2002 Semi-final replay	Fr. O'Neill's	4-13 - 1-14	Diarmuid Ó Mathúna's	Páirc Uí Chaoimh
	L Swayne 2-6, E Holland 1-1, E Conway 1-1, G Holland 0-3, A Brett 0-2.		JP O'Callaghan 0-6, G McCarthy 1-2, D Nyhan 0-2, C O'Leary 0-1, M Fehilly 0-1, K Fleming 0-1, G O'Sullivan 0-1.

=== Final ===
17 November 2002 Final	Ballinhassig	2-12 - 3-07	Fr. O'Neill's	Páirc Uí Chaoimh
	D O'Sullivan 0-9, S Dineen 1-0, D Duggan 1-0, D Dineen 0-1, T Coleman 0-1, P Lombard 0-1.		L Swayne 1-4, E Conway 1-1, A Brett 1-1, G Holland 0-1.

== Championship statistics ==
=== Top scorers ===
Rank	Player	Club	Tally	Total	Matches	Average
1	Luke Swayne	Fr O'Neill's	4-16	28	4	7.00
2	Declan O'Sullivan	Ballinhassig	0-19	19	3	6.33
3	John Paul O'Callaghan	Diarmuid Ó Mathúna's	1-12	15	3	5.00
4	Diarmuid Duggan	Ballinhassig	4-01	13	3	4.33
5	Ger McCarthy	Diarmuid Ó Mathúna's	4-01	13	3	4.33
