= 1953 Cork Junior Hurling Championship =

Irish hurling competition

- Teams: 7
- Champions: Na Piarsaigh (1st title)
- Runners-up: Cloughduv

The 1953 Cork Junior Hurling Championship was the 56th staging of the Cork Junior Hurling Championship since its establishment by the Cork County Board in 1895.

The final was played on 1 November 1953 at the Athletic Grounds in Cork, between Na Piarsaigh and Cloughduv, in what was their first ever meeting in the final. Na Piarsaigh won the match by 6-00 to 2-10 to claim their first ever championship title.

== Results ==
=== Final ===
1 November 1953 Final	Na Piarsaigh	6-00 - 2-10	Cloughduv	Cork Athletic Grounds
