= 1988 Cork Junior A Hurling Championship =

- Dates: 25 September – 13 November 1988
- Teams: 7
- Champions: Valley Rovers (1st title); Don Looney (captain); Ted O'Mahony (manager)
- Runners-up: Newcestown; Michael O'Mahony (captain)

Tournament statistics
- Matches played: 6
- Goals scored: 15 (2.5 per match)
- Points scored: 120 (20 per match)
- Top scorer(s): John Shiels (2-14)

The 1988 Cork Junior A Hurling Championship was the 91st staging of the Cork Junior A Hurling Championship since its establishment by the Cork County Board. The championship ran from 25 September to13 November 1988.

The final was played on 13 November 1988 at Charlie Hurley Park in Bandon, between Valley Rovers and Newcestown, in what was their first ever meeting in the final. Valley Rovers won the match by 0-11 to 1-06 to claim their first ever championship title.

Valley Rovers' John Shiels was the championship's top scorer with 2-14.

== Qualification ==
Division	Championship	Champions
Avondhu	North Cork Junior A Hurling Championship	Kildorrery
Carbery	South West Junior A Hurling Championship	Newcestown
Carrigdhoun	South East Junior A Hurling Championship	Valley Rovers
Duhallow	Duhallow Junior A Hurling Championship	Freemount
Imokilly	East Cork Junior A Hurling Championship	Killeagh
Muskerry	Mid Cork Junior A Hurling Championship	Aghabullogue
Seandún	City Junior A Hurling Championship	Delanys

== Results ==
=== Quarter-finals ===
25 September 1988 Quarter-final	Valley Rovers	2-11 - 0-08	Delanys	Páirc Uí Chaoimh
	J O'Donovan 1-2, D Kiely 1-0, A Crowley 0-3, C O'Donovan 0-2, B O'Sullivan 0-2, E Burke 0-1, MM O'Connell 0-1.		R Barry 0-2, P Doolan 0-2, G Healy 0-2, P Riordan 0-1, B Buckley 0-1.

2 October 1988 Quarter-final	Killeagh	1-08 - 0-08	Kildorrery	Páirc Mac Gearailt
	G Scully 0-4, G Fitzgibbon 1-0, B Galvin 0-2, T Fitzgibbon 0-1, T Scanlan 0-1.		D Nolan 0-4, K Farrell 0-2, D Fitzgerald 0-1, S Keating 0-1.

2 October 1988 Quarter-final	Aghabullogue	2-10 - 0-11	Freemount	Fr. Con Buckley Park
	S Noonan 0-5, MD Buckley 1-1, PB Murphy 1-0, J Healy 0-3, T Buckley 0-1.		F Keane 0-8, M O'Callaghan 0-1, D Keane 0-1, P O'Callaghan 0-1.

=== Semi-finals ===
23 October 1988 Semi-final	Newcestown	1-12 - 2-08	Killeagh	Caherlag Grounds
	Tim Crowley 0-6, E Desmond 1-0, D Wilson 0-1, M O'Mahony 0-1, G Smith 0-1, T Buckley 0-1, Tommy Crowley 0-1, P Kenneally 0-1.		G Scully 0-4, E Hayes 1-0, D Irwin 1-0, T Fitzgibbon 0-2, G Aherne 0-2.

30 October Semi-final	Valley Rovers	5-14 - 1-13	Aghabullogue	Páirc Naomh Eoin
	J Shiels 2-8, M Cronin 1-1, B O'Sullivan 1-0, C O'Donovan 1-0, D Kiely 0-3, P O'Mahony 0-1, A Crowley 0-1.		S Noonan 0-6, T Buckley 1-2, D Ring 0-1, M Healy 0-1, T Murphy 0-1, M Buckley 0-1, P O'Leary 0-1.

=== Final ===
13 November 1988 Final	Valley Rovers	0-11 - 1-06	Newcestown	Charlie Hurley Park
	J Shiels 0-6, C O'Donovan 0-2, A Crowley 0-2, D Kiely 0-1.		Tommy Crowley 1-1, Tim Crowley 0-4, E O'Sullivan 0-1.	Referee: W Horgan (Brian Dillons)

== Championship statistics ==
=== Top scorers ===
Overall

Rank	Player	County	Tally	Total	Matches	Average
1	John Shiels	Valley Rovers	2-14	20	2	10.00
2	Seánie Noonan	Aghabullogue	0-11	11	2	5.50
3	Tim Crowley	Newcestown	0-10	10	2	5.00
4	Frank Keane	Freemount	0-08	8	1	8.00
4	Ger Scully	Killeagh	0-08	8	2	4.00

In a single game

Rank	Player	Club	Tally	Total	Opposition
1	John Shiels	Valley Rovers	2-08	14	Aghabullogue
2	Frank Keane	Freemount	0-08	8	Aghabullogue
3	Tim Crowley	Newcestown	0-06	6	Killeagh
3	Seánie Noonan	Aghabullogue	0-06	6	Valley Rovers
3	John Shiels	Valley Rovers	0-06	6	Newcestown
6	John O'Donovan	Valley Rovers	1-02	5	Delany Rovers
6	Tim Buckley	Aghabullogue	1-02	5	Valley Rovers
6	Seánie Noonan	Aghabullogue	0-05	5	Freemount
