= 1966 Cork Junior Hurling Championship =

Irish hurling competition

- Dates: 9 October – 4 December 1966
- Teams: 7
- Champions: Carrigtwohill (5th title); Dave O'Keeffe (captain)
- Runners-up: Valley Rovers; P. J. Murphy (captain)

Tournament statistics
- Matches played: 6
- Goals scored: 36 (6 per match)
- Points scored: 81 (13.5 per match)
- Top scorer(s): Tony McCarthy (4-04)

The 1966 Cork Junior Hurling Championship was the 69th staging of the Cork Junior Hurling Championship since its establishment by the Cork County Board in 1895. The championship ran from 9 October to 4 December 1966.

The final was played on 4 December 1966 at the Athletic Grounds in Cork, between Carrigtwohill and Valley Rovers, in what was their first ever meeting in the final. Carrigtwohill won the match by 7-06 to 3-03 to claim their fifth championship title overall and a first championship title in 16 years.

Tony McCarthy was the championship's top scorer with 4-04.

== Results ==
=== Quarter-finals ===
9 October 1966 Quarter-final	Courcey Rovers	4-08 - 1-07	Grenagh	Cork Athletic Grounds
	L Keogh 2-0, L Hurley 0-4, J Ryan 1-0, V O'Donovan 1-0, A Crowley 0-2, P O'Donovan 0-1, C Corcoran 0-1.		J Flynn 1-0, P Walsh 0-2, P Duggan 0-2, J McDonald 0-2, B Murphy 0-1.

16 October 1966 Quarter-final	Kanturk	2-07 - 2-05	Kilworth	Bishop Casey Memorial Park
	P Smith 2-0, S O'Connell 0-4, J O'Mahony 0-1, S O'Shea 0-1, D Kenneally 0-1.		K Casey 1-0, P Farren 1-0, D O'Riordan 0-3, J Keating 0-1.

23 October 1966 Quarter-final	Valley Rovers	3-06 - 3-04	Douglas	Carrigaline Grounds
	T McCarthy 1-2, T Fitzgerald 1-2, C McCarthy 1-1, Denis McCarthy 0-1, David McCarthy 0-1, G Sweetnam 0-1.		D Downey 3-0, B Larkin 0-4.

=== Semi-finals ===
6 November 1966 Semi-final	Carrigtwohill	3-10 - 1-11	Courcey Rovers	Ballinhassig Grounds
	P Roche 2-0, P O'Brien 1-1, T Brown 0-3, P Duggan 0-3, A Kelly 0-2, S Barry 0-1.		M Keogh 1-0, A Crowley 0-3, L Hurley 0-3, A Hannon 0-2, C Corcoran 0-2, J O'Regan 0-1.

6 November 1966 Semi-final	Valley Rovers	4-06 - 3-08	Kanturk	Cork Athletic Grounds
	D McCarthy 1-4, F Maher 2-0, T McCarthy 1-2.		P Smith 2-1, T Burke 1-1, J Mahony 0-2, S Connell 0-2, C Loughlin 0-1, M Loughlin 0-1.

=== Final ===
4 December 1966 Final	Carrigtwohill	7-06 - 3-03	Valley Rovers	Cork Athletic Grounds
	P O'Brien 2-0, T Kelly 1-2, T Browne 1-1, S Barry 1-1, T Jeffers 1-0, P Roche 1-0, P Duggan 0-2.		T McCarthy 2-0, T Fitzgerald 1-0, D McCarthy 0-1, A O'Leary 0-1, D O'Brien 0-1.
