= 1975 Cork Junior Hurling Championship =

Irish hurling competition

- Dates: 28 September - 16 November 1975
- Teams: 7
- Champions: Inniscarra (1st title); Tomás Ryan (captain)
- Runners-up: Ballymartle

Tournament statistics
- Matches played: 6
- Goals scored: 28 (4.67 per match)
- Points scored: 109 (18.17 per match)
- Top scorer(s): Jamesie O'Leary (4-03)

The 1975 Cork Junior Hurling Championship was the 78th staging of the Cork Junior Hurling Championship since its establishment by the Cork County Board. The championship began on 28 September 1975 and ended on 16 November 1975.

On 16 November 1975, Inniscarra won the championship following a 5–07 to 3–08 defeat of Ballymartle in the final at the Mardyke Grounds. It remains their only championship title in the grade.

Inniscarra's Jamesie O'Leary was the championship's top scorer with 4-03.

== Results ==
=== Quarter-finals ===
28 September 1975 Quarter-final	Glen Rovers	4-08 - 4-14	Erin's Own	Riverstown Sportsfield
	D McCarthy 2-6, J McCarthy 2-0, K O'Keeffe 0-2.		B Murphy 0-9, D Motherway 2-2, J Buckley 2-0, T Harris 0-1, B Hegarty 0-1, B Murphy 0-1,

5 October 1975 Quarter-final	Ballymartle	4-09 - 2-05	Bandon	Ballinspittle Grounds
	B Coleman 2-1, K O'Donovan 0-5, M Daly 1-1, L Webb 1-0, J Webb 0-2.		N Gallagher 1-0, G O'Mahony 1-0, K O'Driscoll 0-2, P O'Donovan 0-1, F Crowley 0-1, A Duggan 0-1.

12 October 1975 Quarter-final	Inniscarra	1-11 - 0-07	Newmarket	Banteer Sportsfield
	J O'Leary 1-1, T Ryan 0-3, M Healy 0-2, M McDonnell 0-2, P O'Connell 0-2, WJ Healy 0-1.		B Daly 0-4, J Cronin 0-1, TD Cronin 0-1, D O'Sullivan 0-1.

- Ballyhea received a bye in this round.

=== Semi-finals ===
19 October 1975 Semi-final	Ballymartle	2-12 - 1-09	Ballyhea	Ballinlough Grounds
	F Coleman 1-5, Jim Webb 1-0, K Donovan 0-3, F Cronin 0-2, G Webb 0-1, L Webb 0-1.		D Flynn 0-5, W Shanahan 1-1, D Ryan 0-1, P Hartnett 0-1, D Sullivan 0-1.	Referee: A Twomey (Ballincollig)

2 November 1975 Semi-final	Inniscarra	1-13 - 2-06	Erin's Own	Mardyke Grounds
	J O'Leary 1-2, P O'Connell 0-4, T Ryan 0-4, M McDonnell 0-2, T Nyhan 0-1.		D Motherway 1-2, J Buckley 1-0, B Murphy 0-3, D Murphy 0-1.

=== Final ===
16 November 1975 Final	Inniscarra	5-07 - 3-08	Ballymartle	Mardyke Grounds
	WJ Healy 3-1, J O'Leary 2-0, M McDonnell 0-2, T Ryan 0-2, H O'Sullivan 0-1, P O'Connell 0-1.		L Webb 1-4, B Coleman 1-1, F Cronin 1-1, M Daly 0-1, A Cronin 0-1, K Donovan 0-1.	Referee: F Murphy (Blackrock)

== Championship statistics ==
=== Top scorers ===
Overall

Rank	Player	Club	Tally	Total	Matches	Average
1	Jamesie O'Leary	Inniscarra	4-03	15	3	5.00
2	Dave Motherway	Erin's Own	3-04	13	2	6.50
3	Dermot McCarthy	Glen Rovers	2-06	12	1	12.00
3	Barry Murphy	Erin's Own	0-12	12	2	6.00
5	Willie John Healy	Inniscarra	3-02	11	3	3.66
5	Brendan Coleman	Ballymartle	3-02	11	3	3.66
5	Liam Webb	Ballymartle	2-05	11	3	3.66
8	Jim Buckley	Erin's Own	3-00	9	2	4.50
8	Kevin O'Donovan	Ballymartle	0-09	9	3	3.00
8	Tomás Ryan	Inniscarra	0-09	9	3	3.00

In a single game

Rank	Player	Club	Tally	Total	Opposition
1	Dermot McCarthy	Glen Rovers	2-06	12	Erin's Own
2	Willie John Healy	Inniscarra	3-01	10	Ballymartle
3	Barry Murphy	Erin's Own	0-09	12	Glen Rovers
4	Dave Motherway	Erin's Own	2-02	8	Glen Rovers
4	Finbarr Coleman	Ballymartle	1-05	8	Ballyhea
6	Brendan Coleman	Ballymartle	2-01	7	Bandon
6	Liam Webb	Ballymartle	1-04	7	Inniscarra
8	John McCarthy	Glen Rovers	2-00	6	Erin's Own
8	Jim Buckley	Erin's Own	2-00	6	Glen Rovers
8	Jamesie O'Leary	Inniscarra	2-00	6	Ballymartle
