= 1917 Cork Junior Hurling Championship =

Irish hurling competition

- Champions: Midleton (1st title)
- Runners-up: St Mary's

The 1917 Cork Junior Hurling Championship was the 23rd staging of the Cork Junior Hurling Championship since its establishment by the Cork County Board in 1895.

The final was played between Midleton and St Mary's, in what was their first ever meeting in the final. Midleton won the match by 5-03 to 0-01 to claim their first ever championship.

== Results ==
=== Final ===
Final	Midleton	5-03 - 0-01	St Mary's
