= 2015 Cork Junior A Hurling Championship =

2015 Cork Junior Hurling Championship
- Dates: 13 September – 30 October 2015
- Teams: 7
- Sponsor: Evening Echo
- Champions: Dungourney (1st title); Kevin Ronan (captain); Brian Ronayne (manager)
- Runners-up: Cloughduv

Tournament statistics
- Matches played: 7
- Goals scored: 19 (2.71 per match)
- Points scored: 207 (29.57 per match)
- Top scorer(s): Jerry Lucey (2-23); Ryan Denny (0-29)

The 2015 Cork Junior Hurling Championship was the 118th staging of the Cork Junior Hurling Championship since its establishment by the Cork County Board in 1895. The championship began on 13 September 2015 and ended on 30 October 2015.

On 30 October 2015, Dungourney won the championship following a 1-21 to 0-11 defeat of Cloughduv in a replay of the final. This was their first championship title in the grade.

== Qualification ==
Division	Championship	Champions
Avondhu	North Cork Junior A Hurling Championship	Harbour Rovers
Carbery	South West Junior A Hurling Championship	Clonakilty
Carrigdhoun	South East Junior A Hurling Championship	Ballymartle
Duhallow	Duhallow Junior A Hurling Championship	Castlemagner
Imokilly	East Cork Junior A Hurling Championship	Dungourney
Muskerry	Mid Cork Junior A Hurling Championship	Cloughduv
Seandún	City Junior A Hurling Championship	Brian Dillons

== Results ==
=== Bracket ===
Quarter-Finals
Clonakilty (Carbery)	0-10
Cloughduv (Muskerry)	1-19
Harbour Rovers (Avondhu)	0-11
Dungourney (Imokilly)	1-20
Brian Dillons (Seandun)	2-13
Ballymartle (Carrigdhoun)	1-18

Semi-Finals
Castlemagner (Duhallow)	3-10
Cloughduv (Muskerry)	3-19
Dungourney (Imokilly)	3-16
Ballymartle (Carrigdhoun)	1-12

Final
Cloughduv (Muskerry)	2-13, 0-11
Dungourney (Imokilly)	1-16, 1-21

=== First round ===
13 September 2015 First round	Clonakilty	0-10 - 1-19	Cloughduv	Brinny Sportsfield
	M White 0-4, S White 0-3, T Clancy 0-1, T O'Connell 0-1, D Murphy 0-1.		J Moynihan 1-3, J Lucey 0-5, J Ryan 0-4, B Ahern 0-2, S Curzon 0-2, D O'Sullivan 0-1, M Walsh 0-1, C Ryan 0-1.

19 September 2015 First round	Harbour Rovers	0-11 - 1-20	Dungourney	Bride Rovers Park
	S Condon 0-7, P Hannon 0-2, D Pyne 0-1, D Gallagher 0-1.		R Denny 0-8, S Hegarty 0-5, B Aherne 1-1, S Casey 0-2, N Motherway 0-2, J McCarthy 0-1, K Kelleher 0-1.

27 September 2015 First round	Brian Dillons	2-13 - 1-18	Ballymartle	Ted Hanley Memorial Park
	J Horgan 0-9, C McCarthy 2-2, R Murphy 0-1, T Lawrence 0-1.		K Fitzpatrick 1-9, D O'Leary 0-3, A Daly 0-2, S Cummins 0-2, P Geary 0-1, E Healy 0-1.

=== Semi-finals ===
27 September 2015 Semi-final	Cloughduv	3-17 - 3-10	Castlemagner	Mourne Abbey
	J Lucey 2-6, J Moynihan 1-1, J Ryan 0-3, M Walsh 0-2, E Clifford 0-2, S Curzon 0-1, B Ahern 0-1, D O'Sullivan 0-1.		J Cott 2-1, B Barry 0-6, T Murphy 1-0, S Falvey 0-3.

3 October 2015 Semi-final	Ballymartle	1-12 - 3-16	Dungourney	Páirc Uí Rinn
	K Fitzpatrick 1-6, D O'Leary 0-3, A Daly 0-2, J Coleman 0-1.		S Casey 2-3, S Hegarty 1-2, R Denny 0-5, N Motherway 0-2, B Ahern 02-, P Harney 0-1, J Griffin 0-1.

=== Final ===
24 October 2015 Final	Cloughduv	2-13 - 1-16	Dungourney	Páirc Uí Rinn
	J Lucey (0-7, five frees, one 65m), J Ryan (1-2), B Ahern (1-0), D Corkery, G Ahern, E Clifford and S O’Connor (0-1 each).	Report	S Hegarty (0-6), Kenneth Kelleher (1-1), R Denny (0-4, three frees), J Griffin (0-3), J McCarthy and B Ahern (0-1 each).

30 October 2015 Final replay	Cloughduv	0-11 - 1-21	Dungourney	Páirc Uí Rinn
	J Lucey (0-5 frees), B Ahern and C Ryan (0-2 each), J Ryan and E Clifford (0-1 each).	Report	R Denny (0-12), S Hegarty (1-2), J Griffin and S Casey (0-2 each), P Harney, N Motherway and J Leahy (0-1 each).

== Championship statistics ==
=== Top scorers ===
Rank	Player	Club	Tally	Total	Matches	Average
1	Jerry Lucey	Cloughduv	2-23	29	4	7.25
1	Ryan Denny	Dungourney	0-29	29	4	7.25
3	Keith Fitzpatrick	Ballymartle	2-15	21	2	10.50
3	Shane Hegarty	Dungourney	2-15	21	4	5.25
5	Shane Casey	Dungourney	2-07	13	4	3.25
5	Joseph Ryan	Cloughduv	1-10	13	4	3.25
7	James Moynihan	Cloughduv	2-04	10	3	3.33
8	John Horgan	Brian Dillons	0-09	9	1	9.00
9	Cian McCarthy	Brian Dillons	2-02	8	1	8.00
9	Brian Ahern	Cloughduv	1-05	8	4	2.00
