= 1978 Cork Junior Hurling Championship =

Irish hurling competition

- Teams: 7
- Champions: Mayfield (1st title); Jim Nodwell (captain)
- Runners-up: Carrigtwohill

The 1978 Cork Junior Hurling Championship was the 81st staging of the Cork Junior Hurling Championship since its establishment by the Cork County Board.

On 5 November 1978, Mayfield won the championship following a 2-08 to 0-03 defeat of Carritwohill in the final at Páirc Uí Chaoimh in Cork. It was their first ever championship title.

== Results ==
=== Final ===
5 November 1978 Final	Mayfield	2-08 - 0-03	Carrigtwohill	Moore Park
