= 2013 Cork Junior A Hurling Championship =

2013 Cork Junior Hurling Championship
- Dates: 7 September – 10 November 2013
- Teams: 7
- Sponsor: Evening Echo
- Champions: Grenagh (1st title); Séamus Coleman (captain); Johnny Keane (manager)
- Runners-up: Kilbrin; Kieran Sheehan (captain); Seán O'Gorman (manager)

Tournament statistics
- Matches played: 7
- Goals scored: 13 (1.86 per match)
- Points scored: 173 (24.71 per match)
- Top scorer(s): Tom Kenny (1-17)

The 2013 Cork Junior Hurling Championship was the 116th staging of the Cork Junior Hurling Championship since its establishment by the Cork County Board in 1895. The championship began on 7 September 2013 and ended on 10 November 2013.

On 10 November 2013, Grenagh won the championship following a 1-10 to 2-05 defeat of Kilbrin in the final at Páirc Uí Rinn. This was their first championship title in the grade.

Grenagh's Tom Kenny was the championship's top scorer with 1-17.

== Qualification ==
Division	Championship	Champions
Avondhu	North Cork Junior A Hurling Championship	Newtownshandrum
Carbery	South West Junior A Hurling Championship	Dohenys
Carrigdhoun	South East Junior A Hurling Championship	Ballinhassig
Duhallow	Duhallow Junior A Hurling Championship	Kilbrin
Imokilly	East Cork Junior A Hurling Championship	Castlemartyr
Muskerry	Mid Cork Junior A Hurling Championship	Grenagh
Seandún	City Junior A Hurling Championship	Blackrock

== Results ==
=== Bracket ===
Quarter-Finals
Ballinhassig (Carrigdhoun)	2–12
Blackrock (Seandún)	3–16
Grenagh (Muskerry)	0–17
Dohenys (Carbery)	1–07
Newtownshandrum (Avondhu)	0–14
Kilbrin (Duhallow)	1–12

Semi-Finals
Blackrock (Seandún)	0–09
Grenagh (Muskerry)	1–12
Castlemartyr (Imokilly)	0–14, 0–15
Kilbrin (Duhallow)	0–14, 0–16 (R)

Final
Grenagh (Muskerry)	1–10
Kilbrin (Duhallow)	2–05

=== First round ===
7 September 2013 First round	Ballinhassig	2-12 - 3-16	Blackrock	Páirc Uí Rinn
	J Finn 1-1, S Coleman 0-4, B Holland 0-4, C Reynolds 1-0, J Holland 0-1, J Mullaney 0-1, C Tyers 0-1.		B O'Keeffe 2-2, D O'Shea 0-8, C O'Leary 1-3, C Cormack 0-2, R Dineen 0-1.

12 October 2013 First round	Grenagh	0-17 - 1-07	Dohenys	Páirc Naomh Eoin
	T Kenny 0-8, U Duggan 0-2, C Fitzgerald 0-2, D Dalton 0-2, N Doherty 0-1, C O'Neill 0-1, S Burke 0-1.		M Milner 1-2, B McCarthy 0-3, P McCarthy 0-1, A Sheehan 0-1.

19 October 2013 First round	Newtownshandrum	1-14 - 2-12	Kilbrin	Fr. Con Buckley Park
	B O'Connor 0-8, JP Moloney 0-4, JC Coughlan 1-0, K O'Connor 0-1, E Coughlan 0-1.		W Egan 0-5, S Crowley 0-5, K Sheehan 1-1, N O'Callaghan 1-0, T O'Reilly 0-1.

=== Semi-final ===
19 October 2013 Semi-final	Blackrock	0-09 - 1-12	Grenagh	Páirc Uí Rinn
	D O'Shea 0-5, R Dineen 0-1, E Buckley 0-1, A Nolan 0-1, M Drummond 0-1.		T Kenny 1-5, C O'Neill 0-2, N Doherty 0-1, C Fitzgerald 0-1, D Dalton 0-1, M Barry 0-1, T Walsh 0-1.

26 October 2013 Semi-final	Castlemartyr	0-14 - 0-14	Kilbrin	Páirc Uí Rinn
	J Smiddy 0-6, Brian Lawton 0-2, E Clifford 0-2, E O'Keeffe 0-1, S Hennessy 0-1, J Stack 0-1, B Ó Tuama 0-1.		S Crowley 0-4, S O'Reilly 0-2, P Egan 0-2, W Egan 0-2, G Lenihan 0-2, M O'Riordan 0-1, K Sheehan 0-1.

3 November 2013 Semi-final replay	Castlemartyr	0-15 - 0-16	Kilbrin	Páirc Uí Rinn
	Barry Lawton 0-7, E Clifford 0-2, Brian Lawton 0-2, J Smiddy 0-1, Barra Ó Tuama 0-1, D Bowens 0-1, L Martin 0-1.		S Crowley 0-6, S O'Brien 0-4, G Lenihan 0-2, K Sheahan 0-1, T O'Reilly 0-1, C Carroll 0-1, W Egan 0-1.

=== Final ===
10 November 2013 Final	Grenagh	1-10 - 2-05	Kilbrin	Páirc Uí Rinn
	T Kenny (0-4, three frees), D Dalton (1-0), C O’Neill (0-3, 1sl), U Duggan (0-2), S Bourke (0-1).	Report	S O’Reilly and N O’Callaghan (1-0 each), S Crowley (0-2 frees), W Egan, P Egan and E Sheahan (0-1 each).

== Championship statistics ==
=== Top scorers ===
Rank	Player	Club	Tally	Total	Matches	Average
1	Tom Kenny	Grenagh	1-17	20	3	6.66
2	Shane Crowley	Kilbrin	0-17	17	4	4.25
3	David O'Shea	Blackrock	0-13	13	2	6.50
4	William Egan	Kilbrin	0-09	9	4	2.75
5	Brian O'Keeffe	Blackrock	2-02	8	2	4.00
5	Ben O'Connor	Newtownshandrum	0-08	8	1	8.00
7	Barry Lawton	Castlemartyr	0-07	7	1	7.00
7	Jimmy Smiddy	Castlemartyr	0-07	7	1	7.00
9	Noel O'Callaghan	Kilbrin	2-00	6	4	1.50
9	Kieran Sheahan	Kilbrin	1-03	6	4	1.50
9	Colin O'Leary	Blackrock	1-03	6	1	6.00
9	Dean Dalton	Grenagh	1-03	6	3	2.00
9	Colm O'Neill	Grenagh	0-06	6	3	2.00
