= 1901 Cork Junior Hurling Championship =

Irish hurling competition

- Champions: Blackrock (1st title)

The 1901 Cork Junior Hurling Championship was the seventh staging of the Cork Junior Hurling Championship since its establishment by the Cork County Board in 1895.

Blackrock won the championship title in what was their second title overall and a first in six years.
