= 1984 Cork Junior A Hurling Championship =

- Dates: 30 September – 25 November 1984
- Teams: 7
- Champions: Midleton (3rd title); Ger Glavin (captain); Paddy FitzGerald (manager)
- Runners-up: Kilbrittain; Ger O'Connell (captain); John O'Regan (manager)

Tournament statistics
- Matches played: 9
- Goals scored: 39 (4.33 per match)
- Points scored: 172 (19.11 per match)
- Top scorer(s): Ger Glavin (3-19)

The 1984 Cork Junior A Hurling Championship was the 87th staging of the Cork Junior A Hurling Championship since its establishment by the Cork County Board. The championship began on 30 September 1984 and ended on 25 November 1984.

On 25 November 1984, Midleton won the championship following a 3–14 to 2–12 defeat of Kilbrittain in the final. It was their third championship title overall and their first title since 1945.

== Qualification ==
Division	Championship	Champions
Avondhu	North Cork Junior A Hurling Championship	Kildorrery
Carbery	South West Junior A Hurling Championship	Kilbrittain
Carrigdhoun	South East Junior A Hurling Championship	Kinsale
Duhallow	Duhallow Junior A Hurling Championship	Lismire
Imokilly	East Cork Junior A Hurling Championship	Midleton
Muskerry	Mid Cork Junior A Hurling Championship	Aghabullogue
Seandún	City Junior A Hurling Championship	Douglas

== Results ==
=== Quarter-final ===
30 September 1984 Quarter-final	Aghabullogue	1-13 - 3-07	Kinsale	Charlie Hurley Park
	S Noonan 0-9, S O'Leary 1-0, MP Buckley 0-3, T Murphy 0-1.		G Irwin 1-3, B O'Sullivan 1-2, D Dunne 1-1, J O'Brien 0-1.

7 October 1984 Quarter-final replay	Aghabullogue	3-09 - 2-06	Kinsale	Charlie Hurley Park
	S Noonan 0-5, MP Buckley 1-1, S O'Leary 1-1, M Healy 1-0, D Casey 0-1, T Murphy 0-1.		G Irwin 0-5, M O'Sullivan 1-0, D Dunne 1-0, B O'Sullivan 0-1.

7 October 1984 Quarter-final	Midleton	3-15 - 3-15	Lismire	Castletownroche Grounds
	G Glavin 1-7, L Williams 1-2, D Hurley 1-1, K Coakley 0-3, J Hennessy 0-2.		J O'Connor 0-7, P Vaughan 2-0, M Browne 1-1, E O'Loughlin 0-4, J Noonan 0-3.

21 October 1984 Quarter-final replay	Midleton	3-07 - 1-08	Lismire	Castletownroche Grounds
	D Hurley 2-1, G Glavin 0-4 L Williams 1-0, J Hennessy 0-1, K O'Hanlon 0-1.		J O'Connor 1-4, J Noonan 0-1, M Browne 0-1, G Sheehan 0-1, E O'Loughlin 0-1.

21 October 1984 Quarter-final	Douglas	1-10 - 1-05	Kildorrery	Castlelyons Grounds
	F Bermingham 1-3, P Daly 0-4, E Forde 0-2, M O'Regan 0-1.		B O'Connor 1-0, J Duane 0-3, D Bermingham 0-2.

=== Semi-finals ===
21 October 1984 Semi-final	Kilbrittain	5-09 - 1-10	Aghabullogue	Innishannon Grounds
	C O'Connell 2-1, P Brennan 1-4, K O'Driscoll 2-0, G O'Connell 0-1, M Holland 0-1, F Sheehy 0-1, T Brennan 0-1.		S Noonan 0-6, MP Buckley 1-1, S O'Leary 0-3.

28 October 1984 Semi-final	Midleton	1-10 - 2-07	Douglas	Páirc Séamus de Barra
	G Glavin 1-1, J Hennessy 0-3, L Williams 0-3, J O'Farrell 0-1, D Hurley 0-1, A Goldspring 0-1.		E Forde 1-2, P Daly 0-4, P Lynch 1-0, F Bermingham 0-1.

18 November 1984 Semi-final replay	Midleton	2-08 - 2-07	Douglas	Páirc Séamus de Barra
	D Hurley 2-0, K Coakley 0-3, G Glavin 0-2, L Williams 0-2, A Goldspring 0-1.		J Horgan 1-0, P Walsh 1-0, E Forde 0-3, P Daly 0-2, P Lynch 0-2.

=== Final ===
25 November 1984 Final	Midleton	3-13 - 2-12	Kilbrittain	Ballinhassig Grounds
	G Glavin 1-5, D Hurley 1-0, J Hennessy 0-4, A Goldspring 1-0, K Coakley 0-2, J O'Keeffe 0-2.		C O'Connell 2-0, P Brennan 0-6, F Sheehy 0-2, M Holland 0-1, K O'Driscoll 0-1, L Ryan 0-1, G O'Connell 0-1.	Referee: W Horgan (Brian Dillons)

== Championship statistics ==
=== Top scorers ===
Rank	Player	Club	Tally	Total	Matches	Average
1	Ger Glavin	Midleton	3-19	28	5	5.60
2	Des Hurley	Midleton	6-03	21	5	4.20
3	Seán Noonan	Aghabullogue	0-20	20	3	6.66
4	Johnny O'Connor	Lismire	1-11	14	2	7.00
5	Charlie O'Connell	Kilbrittain	4-01	13	2	6.50
5	Liam Williams	Midleton	2-07	13	5	2.60
5	Pa Brennan	Kilbrittain	1-10	13	2	6.50
8	George Irwin	Kinsale	1-08	11	2	5.50
9	Eddie Forde	Douglas	1-07	10	3	3.33
9	John Hennessy	Midleton	0-10	10	5	2.00
