= 1942 Cork Junior Hurling Championship =

Irish hurling competition

- Teams: 8
- Champions: Shanballymore (1st title)

The 1942 Cork Junior Hurling Championship was the 45th staging of the Cork Junior Hurling Championship since its establishment by the Cork County Board.

Shanballymore were awarded the championship without having to play the final after semi-finalists St. Finbarr's and Tracton were disqualified. This was their first ever championship title.
