= 1974 Cork Junior Hurling Championship =

Irish hurling competition

- Teams: 7
- Champions: Watergrasshill (1st title)
- Runners-up: Rath Luirc

The 1974 Cork Junior Hurling Championship was the 77th staging of the Cork Junior Hurling Championship since its establishment by the Cork County Board.

On 3 November 1974, Watergrasshill won the championship following a 3–08 to 0–10 defeat of Rath Luirc in the final at the Castletownroche GAA Grounds. It remains their only championship title in the grade.
