= 2016 Cork Junior A Hurling Championship =

2016 Cork Junior Hurling Championship
- Dates: 10 September – 15 October 2016
- Teams: 7
- Sponsor: Evening Echo
- Champions: Mayfield (2nd title); Shane O'Donovan (captain); Séamus Lawton (manager)
- Runners-up: Sarsfields

Tournament statistics
- Matches played: 6
- Goals scored: 13 (2.17 per match)
- Points scored: 188 (31.33 per match)
- Top scorer(s): Aaron Myers (0-26)

The 2016 Cork Junior Hurling Championship was the 119th staging of the Cork Junior Hurling Championship since its establishment by the Cork County Board in 1895. The championship began on 10 September 2016 and ended on 15 October 2016.

On 15 October 2016, Mayfield won the championship following a 1-16 to 1-13 defeat of Sarsfields in the final. This was their second championship title in the grade and their first since 1978.

Sarsfields' Aaron Myers was the championship's top scorer with 0-26.

== Qualification ==
Division	Championship	Champions
Avondhu	North Cork Junior A Hurling Championship	Harbour Rovers
Carbery	South West Junior A Hurling Championship	Kilbree
Carrigdhoun	South East Junior A Hurling Championship	Valley Rovers
Duhallow	Duhallow Junior A Hurling Championship	Kilbrin
Imokilly	East Cork Junior A Hurling Championship	Sarsfields
Muskerry	Mid Cork Junior A Hurling Championship	Ballinora
Seandún	City Junior A Hurling Championship	Mayfield

== Results ==
=== Quarter-finals ===
10 September 2016 Quarter-final	Ballinora	0-11 - 3-23	Mayfield	Páirc Liam Mhic Cárthaigh
	D Howard 0-7, P Fitton 0-2, D Corkery 0-1, D Holmes 0-1.		S Duggan 2-2, S Kelly 0-4, N Kelly 0-4, K Punch 0-4, P Duggan 1-0, D O'Neill 0-3, D Hayes 0-2, D Malone 0-2, S O'Donovan 0-1, K Walsh 0-1.

10 September 2016 Quarter-final	Kilbrin	1-17 - 0-12	Kilbree	Cloughduv
	E Sheehan 1-3, S O'Reilly 0-4, S Crowley 0-4, L Daly 0-2, D Sheehan 0-2, W Egan 0-1, N O'Callaghan 0-1.		K O'Donovan 0-7, D Coakley 0-2, Ó Scannell 0-1, M O'Donovan 0-1, D McCarthy 0-1.

17 September 2016 Quarter-final	Sarsfields	1-26 - 2-09	Valley Rovers	Carrigaline
	A Myers 0-9, C Duggan 1-3, D O'Mahony 0-5, J Sweeeny 0-3, T Crowley 0-2, E Collins 0-2, R Duggan 0-1, R Ryan 0-1.		R Butler 0-7, E Burke 1-1, A Lyons 1-0, C Butler 0-1.

=== Semi-finals ===
25 September 2016 Semi-final	Kilbrin	0-12 - 1-17	Mayfield	Coachford Sportsfield
	S Crowley 0-5, G Linehan 0-2, D O'Sullivan 0-1, M Linehan 0-1, E Sheehan 0-1, S O'Reilly 0-1, W Egan 0-1.		S O'Donovan 0-10, S Kelly 1-1, S Duggan 0-3, D O'Neill 0-2, K Punch 0-1.

25 September 2016 Semi-final	Sarsfields	3-19 - 0-09	Harbour Rovers	Páirc Mac Gearailt
	A Myers 0-9, D O'Mahony 0-5, C Duggan 1-1, F McSweeney 1-1, E Gaffey 1-0, P Barry 0-2, R Duggan 0-1.		S Condon 0-5, D Pyne 0-1, S O'Riordan 0-1, D Gallagher 0-1, J Coughlan 0-1.

=== Final ===
15 October 2016 Final	Mayfield	1-16 - 1-13	Sarsfields	Páirc Uí Rinn
	N Kelly 0-10, P Duggan 1-0, K Punch 0-3, R O'Keeffe 0-2, D O'Neill 0-1.		A Myers 0-8, R Murphy 1-1, T Crowley 0-1, J McSweeney 0-1, P Barry 0-1, C Duggan 0-1.

== Championship statistics ==
=== Top scorers ===
Rank	Player	County	Tally	Total	Matches	Average
1	Aaron Myers	Sarsfields	0-26	26	3	8.66
2	Nicky Kelly	Mayfield	0-14	14	3	4.66
3	Shane Duggan	Mayfield	2-05	11	3	3.66
3	Cormac Duggan	Sarsfields	2-05	11	3	3.66
3	Shane O'Donovan	Mayfield	0-11	11	3	3.66
6	Daniel O'Mahony	Sarsfields	0-10	10	3	3.33
7	Shane Crowley	Kilbrin	0-09	9	2	4.50
8	Shane Kelly	Mayfield	1-05	8	3	2.66
8	Kevin Punch	Mayfield	0-08	8	3	2.66
10	Eoin Sheehan	Kilbrin	1-04	7	3	3.50
10	David Howard	Ballinora	0-07	7	1	7.00
10	Kevin O'Donovan	Kilbree	0-07	7	1	7.00
10	Richie Butler	Valley Rovers	0-07	7	1	7.00
