= 1951 Cork Junior Hurling Championship =

Irish hurling competition

- Dates: 16 September - 28 October 1951
- Teams: 7
- Champions: Castlemartyr (1st title); Paddy Abernethy (captain)
- Runners-up: Cloughduv; Dan O'Connor (captain)

Tournament statistics
- Matches played: 6
- Goals scored: 56 (9.33 per match)
- Points scored: 41 (6.83 per match)

The 1951 Cork Junior Hurling Championship was the 54th staging of the Cork Junior Hurling Championship since its establishment by the Cork County Board.

On 28 October 1951, Castlemartyr won the championship following a 6-05 to 2-07 defeat of Cloughduv in the final at the Cork Athletic Grounds. This was their first ever championship title.

== Results ==
=== Quarter-finals ===
| 16 September 1951 Quarter-final | Ballymartle | 10-04 - 5-01 | Courcey Rovers | Kinsale Sportsfield |

| 23 September 1951 Quarter-final | Newtownshandrum | 6-04 - 4-01 | Castlemagner | Buttevant Sportsfield |

| 23 September 1951 Quarter-final | Castlemartyr | 7-02 - 3-04 | Lough Rovers | Clonmult Memorial Park |

- Cloughduv received a bye in this round.

=== Semi-finals ===
| 30 September 1951 Semi-final | Cloughduv | 5-03 - 3-03 | Ballymartle | Innishannon Sportsfield |

| 14 October 1951 Semi-final | Castlemartyr | 3-06 - 2-01 | Newtownshandrum | Fitzgerald Park |

=== Final ===
| 28 October 1951 Final | Castlemartyr | 6-05 - 2-07 | Cloughduv | Cork Athletic Grounds |
