= Cork Junior A Hurling Championship =

Annual hurling competition

- Irish: Craobh Iomána Shóisearach A Chorcaí
- Code: Hurling
- Founded: 1895; 131 years ago
- Region: Cork (GAA)
- Trophy: John Quirke Cup
- No. of teams: 7 (county championship); 70 (total)
- Title holders: Tracton (3rd title)
- Most titles: Carrigtwohill (6 titles)
- Sponsors: Co-Op Superstores
- Official website: Cork GAA

The Cork Junior A Hurling Championship (known for sponsorship reasons as the Co-Op Superstores Cork Junior A Hurling Championship and abbreviated to the Cork JAHC) is an annual hurling competition organised by the Cork County Board of the Gaelic Athletic Association and contested by the top-ranking junior clubs in the county of Cork in Ireland. It is the sixth tier overall in the entire Cork hurling championship system and is regarded as one of the toughest club competitions to win.

The Cork Junior Championship was introduced in 1895 as a countywide competition for teams deemed not eligible for the senior grade or second-string senior teams. At the time of its creation it was the second tier of Cork hurling.

In its current format, the Cork Junior A Championship begins in September following the completion of the seven Divisional Junior Championships. The 7 participating teams compete in a single-elimination tournament which culminates with the final match at Páirc Uí Rinn in October or November. The winner of the Cork Junior A Championship, as well as being presented with the John Quirke Cup, gains promotion to the Cork Premier Junior Hurling Championship.

The competition has been won by 72 teams, 29 of which have won it more than once. Carrigtwohill are the most successful team in the championships history, having won it 6 times. Tracton are the title holders, defeating Killavullen by 1–15 to 1–10 in the 2024 final.

== History ==
Officially known as the Cork Junior A Hurling Championship, it is regarded as one of the most hotly contested and most difficult to win of all the county championships. Established in 1895 as the "seconds championship", by the 1930s it developed along divisional lines due to the increased number of clubs participating.

The first championship took place in 1895 when Blackrock were crowned junior champions.

== Format ==
=== Current format ===
Quarter-finals: Six of the seven divisional champions compete in this round. The seventh divisional champion receives a bye to the next round. Three teams qualify for the next round, joining the seventh divisional champion.

Semi-finals: The two semi-finals feature the three quarter-final-winning teams and the team that receives a bye. Two teams qualify for the next round.

Final: The two semi-final winners contest the final. The winning team are declared champions.

=== 2017-2019 ===
First round: The seven divisional champions are seeded and are drawn to play the seven divisional runners-up. Repeat pairings from divisional finals are avoided in this round. Six teams qualify for the next round with one team receiving a bye.

Quarter-finals: The three quarter-finals feature the six first round-winning teams. Three teams qualify for the next round.

Semi-finals: The two semi-finals feature the three quarter-final-winning teams and the team that receives a bye from the first round . Two teams qualify for the next round.

Final: The two semi-final winners contest the final. The winning team are declared champions.

== Teams ==
=== Qualification ===
Division	Championship	Qualifying teams
Avondhu	North Cork Junior A Hurling Championship	Champions
Carbery	Carbery Junior A Hurling Championship	Champions
Carrigdhoun	South East Junior A Hurling Championship	Champions
Duhallow	Duhallow Junior A Hurling Championship	Champions
Imokilly	East Cork Junior A Hurling Championship	Champions
Muskerry	Mid Cork Junior A Hurling Championship	Champions
Seandún	Cork City Junior A Hurling Championship	Champions

=== 2026 Teams ===
69 clubs will compete in the 2026 Cork Junior A Hurling Championship: seven teams from Duhallow, eleven teams from Avondhu, eleven teams from Muskerry, twelve teams from Carbery, eight teams from Seandún, nine teams from Carrigdhoun and eleven teams from Imokilly.

Team	Location	Colours	Division	Divisional Titles	Last Divisional Title	Championship Titles	Last Championship Title
Aghabullogue	Coachford	Green and white	Muskerry	16	1998	1	1991
Ballinascarthy	Ballinascarthy	Red and white	Carbery	8	2025	0	—
Ballincollig	Ballincollig	Green and white	Muskerry	5	1990	2	1963
Ballinhassig	Ballinhassig	Blue and white	Carrigdhoun	29	2014	3	2002
Ballinora	Ballinora	Green and red	Muskerry	11	2025	0	—
Ballyclough	Ballyclough	Green and yellow	Avondhu	0	—	0	—
Ballygarvan	Ballygarvan	Red and white	Carrigdhoun	2	2004	1	2004
Ballyhooly	Ballyhooly	Blue and yellow	Avondhu	0	—	0	—
Ballymartle	Riverstick	Green and gold	Carrigdhoun	16	2021	3	1986
Bandon	Bandon	White and yellow	Carbery	13	2009	4	1999
Banteer	Banteer	Red and white	Duhallow	8	2017	0	—
Belgooly	Belgooly	White and blue	Carrigdhoun	2	2025	0	—
Blackrock	Blackrock	Green and yellow	Seandún	7	2013	5	1947
Blarney	Blarney	Red and white	Muskerry	13	1993	2	1993
Bride Rovers	Rathcormac	Green, white and yellow	Imokilly	5	1998	1	1998
Buttevant	Buttevant	Black and amber	Avondhu	1	2010	0	—
Carrigaline	Carrigaline	Blue and yellow	Carrigdhoun	10	2003	0	—
Carrignavar	Carrignavar	Red and green	Imokilly	3	2023	0	—
Carrigtwohill	Carrigtwohill	Blue and gold	Imokilly	9	1994	6	1994
Charleville	Charleville	Red and white	Avondhu	9	2011	1	2011
Clonakilty	Clonakilty	Green and red	Carbery	18	2023	0	—
Cobh	Cobh	Yellow and green	Imokilly	4	2025	5	1959
Courcey Rovers	Ballinspittle	Red and white	Carrigdhoun	6	2019	1	2001
Clyda Rovers	Mourneabbey	Black and yellow	Avondhu	3	2019	1	1989
Diarmuid Ó Mathúna's	Castletown-Kinneigh	Blue and gold	Carbery	7	2026	0	—
Dohenys	Dunmanway	Green and white	Carbery	4	2013	0	—
Donoughmore	Donoughmore	Black and white	Muskerry	1	2026	0	—
Douglas	Douglas	Green, black and white hoops	Seandún	3	1984	0	—
Dripsey	Dripsey	Red and blue	Muskerry	1	2008	1	2008
Dromina	Dromina	Blue and yellow	Avondhu	6	2026	1	2003
Dromtarriffe	Rathcoole	Red and white	Duhallow	5	2024	0	—
Dungourney	Dungourney	Green and gold	Imokilly	4	2015	1	2015
Éire Óg	Ovens	Red and white	Muskerry	7	1977	2	1977
Fermoy	Fermoy	Black and amber	Avondhu	8	2009	1	2009
Freemount	Freemount	Maroon and white	Duhallow	6	2005	0	—
Fr O'Neill's	Ballymacoda	Green and red	Imokilly	5	2005	1	2005
Glen Rovers	Blackpool	Green, black and yellow	Seandún	17	2008	2	1950
Grenagh	Grenagh	Blue and gold	Muskerry	11	2013	1	2013
Harbour Rovers	Glanworth	Green and white	Avondhu	4	2023	0	—
Inniscarra	Inniscarra	Blue and white	Muskerry	9	2020	1	1975
Kilbree	Rossmore	Blue and white	Carbery	2	2018	0	—
Kilbrin	Kilbrin	Blue and white	Duhallow	11	2016	0	—
Kilbrittain	Kilbrittain	Black and amber	Carbery	12	1985	1	1985
Killavullen	Killavullen	Blue and white	Avondhu	1	2024	0	—
Killeagh	Killeagh	Green and white	Imokilly	7	2026	1	1995
Kilmichael	Kilmichael	Blue and gold	Muskerry	0	—	0	—
Kinsale	Kinsale	Blue and white	Carrigdhoun	7	2020	2	1933
Liscarroll/Churchtown Gaels	Churchtown	Green, white and yellow	Avondhu	0	—	0	—
Meelin	Meelin	Green and gold	Duhallow	20	2010	1	2010
Midleton	Midleton	Black and white	Imokilly	10	1990	4	1990
Millstreet	Millstreet	Green and yellow	Duhallow	3	1963	0	—
Na Piarsaigh	Fair Hill	Yellow and black	Seandún	6	1997	1	1953
Newcestown	Newcestown	Red and yellow	Carbery	9	2014	3	1992
Newmarket	Newmarket	Black and red	Duhallow	18	2026	0	—
Passage West	Passage West	Green and white	Seandún	1	2021	2	1906
Randal Óg	Dunmanway	Yellow and green	Carbery	0	—	0	—
Sarsfields	Glanmire	Blue, white and black	Imokilly	4	2016	1	1937
Shamrocks	Shanbally	Green and white	Carrigdhoun	5	2005	1	1904
Shanballymore	Shanballymore	Red and black	Avondhu	5	1997	2	1942
St Colum's	Kealkill	Black and orange	Carbery	0	—	0	—
St Ita's	Gortroe	White and green	Imokilly	1	2021	0	—
St James'	Ardfield	Green and gold	Carbery	0	—	0	—
St Mary's	Enniskean	Black and gold	Carbery	0	—	0	—
St Vincent's	Gurranabraher	Green and white	Seandún	3	1957	0	—
Uíbh Laoire	Inchigeelagh	Red and white	Muskerry	0	—	0	—
Valley Rovers	Innishannon	Green and white	Carrigdhoun	11	2026	1	1988
Watergrasshill	Watergrasshill	Red and white	Imokilly	3	2003	1	1974
White's Cross	Ballinvriskig	Green and white	Seandún	0	—	0	—
Whitechurch	Whitechurch	Purple and yellow	Seandún	3	2026	0	—

== Trophy ==
The winning team is presented with the John Quirke Cup. Born in Milltown, County Kerry, Johnny Quirke (1911–1983) played hurling for Blackrock and was a member of the Cork senior hurling team for 14 years, during which time he won four successive All-Ireland Championships between 1941 and 1944. He served as a Cork selector for many years and was deeply involved at all levels with the Blackrock club.

== Sponsorship ==
TSB Bank became the first title sponsor of the championship, serving in that capacity until 2005 when the Evening Echo signed a sponsorship deal. In 2020, Dairygold Co-Op Superstores were unveiled as the new title sponsor of the Cork Junior A Championship.

== Roll of Honour ==
=== By club ===
#	Club	Titles	Runners-up	Championships won	Championship runner-up
1	Carrigtwohill	6	3	1896, 1915, 1941, 1948, 1966, 1994	1897, 1962, 1978
2	Cobh	5	4	1907, 1913, 1916, 1926, 1959	1911, 1912, 1923, 1985
2	Redmonds	5	3	1897, 1898, 1899, 1900, 1909	1896, 1905, 1906
2	Blackrock	5	2	1895, 1901, 1910, 1931, 1947	1899, 1903
5	Midleton	4	2	1917, 1945, 1984, 1990	1908, 1925
5	Castlemartyr	4	2	1935, 1951, 1964, 2014	1947, 1963
5	Bandon	4	0	1929, 1949, 1971, 1999	—
8	Cloughduv	3	12	1940, 1970, 2018	1910, 1922, 1938, 1948, 1951, 1953, 1956, 1964, 1967, 2009, 2010, 2015
8	Ballinhassig	3	5	1965, 1973, 2002	1954, 1971, 1995, 2000, 2014
8	Ballymartle	3	2	1952, 1958, 1986	1936, 1975
8	Cloyne	3	2	1939, 1961, 1987	1944, 1960
8	St Finbarr's	3	1	1902, 1903, 1956	1900
8	Ballyhea	3	1	1930, 1955, 1976	1959
8	Newcestown	3	1	1972, 1980, 1992	1988
8	Tracton	3	0	1957, 1979, 2024	—
16	Mayfield	2	6	1978, 2016	1934, 1935, 1939, 1941, 1969, 2011
16	Kilworth	2	4	1967, 2006	1961, 1980, 1993, 2005
16	Shanballymore	2	3	1908, 1942	1902, 1904, 1937
16	Glen Rovers	2	2	1924, 1950	1943, 1976
16	Ballincollig	2	2	1927, 1963	1987, 1990
16	Newtownshandrum	2	2	1946, 1969	1940, 1992
16	Passage West	2	1	1905, 1906	1945
16	Kinsale	2	1	1918, 1933	1930
16	Castletownroche	2	1	1960, 1982	1979
16	Blarney	2	1	1936, 1993	1898
16	St Catherine's	2	1	1983, 2017	1981
16	St. Anne's	2	0	1925, 1928	—
16	Éire Óg	2	0	1962, 1977	—
16	Nemo Rangers	2	0	2000, 2023	—
30	Courcey Rovers	1	4	2001	1957, 1970, 1997, 1999
30	Brian Dillons	1	3	1938	1965, 2012, 2017
30	Aghabullogue	1	3	1991	1907, 1909, 1983
30	Charleville	1	3	2011	1974, 2001, 2007
30	Kilbrittain	1	2	1985	1927, 1984
30	Fr O'Neill's	1	2	2005	1996, 2002
30	Meelin	1	2	2010	1973, 1986
30	Grenagh	1	2	2013	1958, 2004
30	Rangers	1	1	1911	1914
30	Mallow	1	1	1914	1950
30	Doneraile	1	1	1919	1918
30	Lough Rovers	1	1	1932	1952
30	Sarsfields	1	1	1937	2016
30	Kanturk	1	1	1969	1949
30	Inniscarra	1	1	1975	1968
30	Valley Rovers	1	1	1988	1966
30	Arigdeen Rangers	1	1	1996	2003
30	Barryroe	1	1	2007	1994
30	Kildorrery	1	1	2012	1972
30	Dungourney	1	1	2015	2006
30	Russell Rovers	1	1	2019	2018
30	Erin's Own	1	1	2022	1977
30	Kilshannig	1	1	2025	2022
30	Shamrocks	1	0	1904	—
30	Fr. O'Leary Hall	1	0	1912	—
30	Fr. Matthew Hall	1	0	1922	—
30	Geraldines	1	0	1923	—
30	Liscarroll	1	0	1934	—
30	Oldcastletown	1	0	1943	—
30	31st Battalion	1	0	1944	—
30	Na Piarsaigh	1	0	1953	—
30	Castlemagner	1	0	1954	—
30	Watergrasshill	1	0	1974	—
30	Milford	1	0	1981	—
30	Clyda Rovers	1	0	1989	—
30	Killeagh	1	0	1995	—
30	Castlelyons	1	0	1997	—
30	Bride Rovers	1	0	1998	—
30	Dromina	1	0	2003	—
30	Ballygarvan	1	0	2004	—
30	Dripsey	1	0	2008	—
30	Fermoy	1	0	2009	—
30	Lisgoold	1	0	2020	—
30	Ballygiblin	1	0	2021	—
74	O'Donovan Rossa	0	3	—	1931, 1932, 1933
74	St Mary’s	0	2	—	1913, 1917
74	Harbour Rovers	0	2	—	2020, 2023
74	Ballinora	0	2	—	1929, 2025
74	Evergreen	0	1	—	1895
74	Knockavilla	0	1	—	1915
74	Funcheon Vale	0	1	—	1916
74	Fairhill	0	1	—	1919
74	Dohenys	0	1	—	1924
74	College Rovers	0	1	—	1926
74	Ballinacurra	0	1	—	1928
74	Clonakilty	0	1	—	1946
74	Delaney Rovers	0	1	—	1982
74	Ballinascarthy	0	1	—	1989
74	Aghada	0	1	—	1991
74	Freemount	0	1	—	1998
74	Diarmuid Ó Mathúna's	0	1	—	2008
74	Kilbrin	0	1	—	2013
74	Carrignavar	0	1	—	2019
74	Dromtarriffe	0	1	—	2021
74	Killavullen	0	1	—	2024

==== Notes ====
- No runners-up in championship: 1901, 1942 and 1945

=== By division ===
#	Division	Titles	Runners-Up	Total	Most recent win
1	Imokilly	34	23	57	2022
2	Seandún	31	26	57	2023
3	Avondhu	23	22	44	2025
4	Carrigdhoun	15	13	28	2024
5	Muskerry	13	23	35	2018
6	Carbery	10	13	23	2007
7	Duhallow	3	6	9	2010

== List of Finals ==
=== List of Cork JAHC finals ===
Year	Winners		Runners-up	
Year	Club	Score	Club	Score
2026	Championship in progress.			
2025	Kilshannig	1-19	Ballinora	0-11
2024	Tracton	1-15	Killavullen	1-10
2023	Nemo Rangers	1-14	Harbour Rovers	1-12
2022	Erin's Own	0-16, 1-30 (aet)	Kilshannig	0-16, 3-20
2021	Ballygiblin	2–18	Dromtarriffe	0–18
2020	Lisgoold	2–19	Harbour Rovers	0–16
2019	Russell Rovers	1–17	Carrignavar	0-09
2018	Cloughduv	2–12	Russell Rovers	0–14
2017	St. Catherine's	2–10, 0–13 (R)	Brian Dillons	1–13, 0–12 (R)
2016	Mayfield	1–16	Sarsfields	1–13
2015	Dungourney	1–16, 1–21 (R)	Cloughduv	2–13, 0–11 (R)
2014	Castlemartyr	0–18	Ballinhassig	0–10
2013	Grenagh	1–10	Kilbrin	2-05
2012	Kildorrery	2-08	Brian Dillons	0–13
2011	Charleville	2–10	Mayfield	0–11
2010	Meelin	1–19	Cloughduv	2-09
2009	Fermoy	1–14	Cloughduv	0–10
2008	Dripsey	0–13	Diarmuid Ó Mathúnas	1-07
2007	Barryroe	2–19	Charleville	2–13
2006	Kilworth	0–13	Dungourney	0–12
2005	Fr. O'Neill's	0–15	Kilworth	1-09
2004	Ballygarvan	3-07	Grenagh	1–12
2003	Dromina	2–13	Arigdeen Rangers	0-09
2002	Ballinhassig	2–12	Fr. O'Neill's	3-07
2001	Courcey Rovers	3-09	Charleville	3-07
2000	Nemo Rangers	2-08	Ballinhassig	1–10
1999	Bandon	0–11	Courcey Rovers	1-07
1998	Bride Rovers	2–10	Freemount	0–13
1997	Castlelyons	2-09	Courcey Rovers	1–11
1996	Arigdeen Rangers	3-09	Fr. O'Neill's	0–11
1995	Killeagh	3-09	Ballinhassig	0-08
1994	Carrigtwohill	0–12	Barryroe	1-07
1993	Blarney	2–10	Kilworth	1-09
1992	Newcestown	2–14	Newtownshandrum	3-05
1991	Aghabullogue	1–12, 1–13 (R)	Aghada	1–12, 1–09 (R)
1990	Midleton	1–15	Ballincollig	1-09
1989	Clyda Rovers	0–12, 0–11 (R)	Ballinascarthy	2-06, 1–07 (R)
1988	Valley Rovers	0–11	Newcestown	1-06
1987	Cloyne	6-08	Ballincollig	3-06
1986	Ballymartle	3-08	Meelin	2-04
1985	Kilbrittain	5-07	Cobh	1–12
1984	Midleton	3–12	Kilbrittain	2–11
1983	St. Catherine's	1–13	Aghabullogue	1-08
1982	Castletownroche	5–18	Delaney's	3-04
1981	Milford	1–10	St. Catherine's	0–11
1980	Newcestown	1–12	Kilworth	2-06
1979	Tracton	4–12	Castletownroche	1-06
1978	Mayfield	2-08	Carrigtwohill	0-03
1977	Éire Óg	2-08	Erin's Own	1-09
1976	Ballyhea	4–14	Glen Rovers	4–10
1975	Inniscarra	5-07	Ballymartle	3-08
1974	Watergrasshill	3-08	Charleville	0–10
1973	Ballinhassig	1-06	Meelin	0-05
1972	Newcestown	2-07	Kildorrery	2-04
1971	Bandon	3–12	Ballinhassig	4-05
1970	Cloughduv	3–15	Courcey Rovers	2-04
1969	Kanturk	3-07	Mayfield	1–10
1968	Newtownshandrum	1-09	Inniscarra	2-04
1967	Kilworth	3–11	Cloughduv	2-07
1966	Carrigtwohill	7-06	Valley Rovers	3-03
1965	Ballinhassig	6-05	Brian Dillons	1-02
1964	Castlemartyr	4-05	Cloughduv	2-09
1963	Ballincollig	4-08, 1–11 (R)	Castlemartyr	6-02, 1–07 (R)
1962	Éire Óg	3-04	Carrigtwohill	2-04
1961	Cloyne	3-07, 4–06 (R)	Kilworth	4-04, 2–04 (R)
1960	Castletownroche	3-06	Cloyne	4-02
1959	Cobh	3-09	Ballyhea	2-06
1958	Ballymartle	1-07, 8–10 (R)	Grenagh	2-04, 2–01 (R)
1957	Tracton	4-05	Courcey Rovers	3-04
1956	St. Finbarr's	4-08	Castletownroche	3-03
1955	Ballyhea *		w/o	
1954	Castlemagner	3-08	Ballinhassig	4-04
1953	Na Piarsaigh	6-00	Cloughduv	2–10
1952	Ballymartle	3-06, 2–10 (R)	Lough Rovers	4-03, 3–05 (R)
1951	Castlemartyr	6-05	Cloughduv	2-07
1950	Glen Rovers	4-06	Mallow	3-00
1949	Bandon	7-03	Kanturk	1-02
1948	Carrigtwohill	6-05	Cloughduv	1-01
1947	Blackrock	6-03	Castlemartyr	5-00
1946	Newtownshandrum	4-02, 6–03 (R)	Clonakilty	4-02, 1–04 (R)
1945	Midleton	3-06	Passage	3-03
1944	31st Battalion	5-05	Cloyne	2-04
1943	Oldcastletown	3-04	Glen Rovers	2-00
1942	Shanballymore *		w/o	
1941	Carrigtwohill	5-01	Mayfield	2-00
1940	Cloughduv	10-00	Newtownshandrum	5-01
1939	Cloyne	6-05	Mayfield	3-03
1938	Brian Dillons	5-02	Cloughduv	2-03
1937	Sarsfields	5-05	Shanballymore	5-02
1936	Blarney	6-02	Ballymartle	3-01
1935	Castlemartyr	1-03, 4–01, 2–01, 1–01 *	Mayfield	1-03, 4–01, 2–00, 4–03
1934	Liscarroll	2-04	Mayfield	0-03
1933	Kinsale	5-04	Skibbereen	0-01
1932	Lough Rovers	5-04	Skibbereen	4-01
1931	Blackrock	3-07	Skibbereen	1-01
1930	Ballyhea	3-01	Kinsale	0-02
1929	Bandon	2-05	Ballinora	2-01
1928	St. Anne's	3-01	Ballinacurra	2-00
1927	Ballincollig	4-00	Kilbrittain	3-01
1926	Cobh	8-02	College Rovers	1-01
1925	St. Anne's	2-03	Midleton	1-03
1924	Glen Rovers		Dohenys	
1923	Geraldines	5-04	Cobh	5-03
1922	Fr. Matthew Hall	3-01	Cloughduv	2-02
1921	No Championship			
1920	No Championship			
1919	Doneraile	1-07	Fairhill	1-02
1918	Kinsale	4-01	Doneraile	2-01
1917	Midleton	5-03	St. Mary's	0-01
1916	Cobh	9-01	Funcheon Vale	6-02
1915	Carrigtwohill	1-02	Knockavilla	1-00
1914	Mallow	9-03	Rangers	1-01
1913	Cobh	1-03	St. Mary's	1-02
1912	Fr. O'Leary Hall	6-00	Cobh	0-00
1911	Rangers	4-01	Cobh	0-00
1910	Blackrock	10-04	Cloughduv	1–11
1909	Redmonds	4–12	Aghabullogue	1-03
1908	Shamrocks	2–16	Midleton	0-03
1907	Cobh	5–13	Aghabullogue	0-02
1906	Passage		Redmonds	
1905	Passage		Redmonds	
1904	Shamrocks	3-08	Shanballymore	3-03
1903	St. Finbarr's	3–15	Blackrock	4-06
1902	St. Finbarr's		Shanballymore	
1901	Blackrock			
1900	Redmonds		St. Finbarr's	
1899	Redmonds	6-01	Blackrock	5-02
1898	Redmonds		Blarney	
1897	Redmonds		Carrigtwohill	
1896	Carrigtwohill	7-02	Redmonds	0-04
1895	Blackrock		Evergreen	

- 1955 Aghabullogue and Castlelyons disqualified after meeting in the semi-final
- 1942 Tracton and St. Finbarr's disqualified
- 1935 The second replay abandoned due to weather conditions fifteen minutes from the end. The third replay abandoned a few minutes from time. Both teams suspended for two months and the championship declared null and void.

== Records and statistics ==
=== Final ===
==== Team ====
- Most wins: 6:
  - Carrigtwohill (1896, 1915, 1941, 1948, 1966, 1994)
- Most consecutive wins: 4:
  - Redmonds (1897, 1898, 1899, 1900)

=== Divisional winners by year (2006–present) ===
Year	Duhallow	Avondhu	Muskerry	Carbery	Seandún	Carrigdhoun	Imokilly
2026	Newmarket	Dromina	Donoughmore	Diarmuid Ó Mathúna's	Whitechurch	Valley Rovers	Killeagh
2025	Newmarket	Kilshannig	Ballinora	Ballinascarthy	Whitechurch	Belgooly	Cobh
2024	Dromtarriffe	Killavullen	Ballinora	Diarmuid Ó Mathúna's	Whitechurch	Tracton	Killeagh
2023	Newmarket	Harbour Rovers	Ballinora	Clonakilty	Nemo Rangers	Belgooly	Carrignavar
2022	Dromtarriffe	Kilshannig	Ballinora	Ballinascarthy	Nemo Rangers	Valley Rovers	Erin's Own
2021	Dromtarriffe	Ballygiblin	Ballinora	Ballinascarthy	Passage West	Ballymartle	St Ita's
2020	Dromtarriffe	Harbour Rovers	Inniscarra	Clonakilty	Brian Dillons	Kinsale	Lisgoold
2019	Newmarket	Clyda Rovers	Cloughduv	Ballinascarthy	Brian Dillons	Courcey Rovers	Russell Rovers
2018	Dromtarriffe	Ballygiblin	Cloughduv	Kilbree	Nemo Rangers	Courcey Rovers	Russell Rovers
2017	Banteer	Dromina	Cloughduv	Clonakilty	Nemo Rangers	Valley Rovers	St Catherine's
2016	Kilbrin	Harbour Rovers	Ballinora	Kilbree	Mayfield	Valley Rovers	Sarsfields
2015	Castlemagner	Harbour Rovers	Cloughduv	Clonakilty	Brian Dillons	Ballymartle	Dungourney
2014	Kilbrin	Dromina	Cloughduv	Newcestown	St Finbarr's	Ballinhassig	Castlemartyr
2013	Kilbrin	Newtownshandrum	Grenagh	Dohenys	Blackrock	Ballinhassig	Castlemartyr
2012	Kilbrin	Kildorrery	Grenagh	Clonakilty	Brian Dillons	Ballinhassig	Carrignavar
2011	Kilbrin	Charleville	Cloughduv	St Oliver Plunketts	Mayfield	Ballinhassig	Dungourney
2010	Meelin	Buttevant	Cloughduv	Diarmuid Ó Mathúna's	Mayfield	Ballymartle	Castlemartyr
2009	Meelin	Fermoy	Cloughduv	Bandon	Nemo Rangers	Ballinhassig	Castlemartyr
2008	Tullylease	Charleville	Dripsey	Diarmuid Ó Mathúna's	Glen Rovers	Ballymartle	Carrignavar
2007	Kilbrin	Charleville	Grenagh	Barryroe	Glen Rovers	Kinsale	Erin's Own
2006	Banteer	Kilworth	Cloughduv	Barryroe	Brian Dillons	Ballinhassig	Dungourney

== See also ==
Cork Junior A Football Championship

- Cork Premier Senior Hurling Championship (Tier 1)
- Cork Senior A Hurling Championship (Tier 2)
- Cork Premier Intermediate Hurling Championship (Tier 3)
- Cork Intermediate A Hurling Championship (Tier 4)
- Cork Premier Junior Hurling Championship (Tier 5)
- Cork Junior A Hurling Championship (Tier 6)
- Cork Junior B Hurling Championship (Tier 7)

== Sources ==
- Cork Junior Hurling Champions
- Cork GAA – A History 1886–1986 Jim Cronin
