= Freemount GAA =

Gaelic games club in County Cork, Ireland

Freemount
- Cnoc an Teampaill
- County: Cork
- Colours: Maroon and white
- Grounds: Freemount GAA Grounds

Playing kits
Standard colours

Freemount GAA is a Gaelic Athletic Association club based in the village of Freemount in the north-west of County Cork, Ireland which forms part of the parish of Milford, Freemount and Tullylease. The club plays in the Duhallow division and competes in the Junior B Hurling Championship and the Junior C Football Championship. Due to a small local population, the club merges with neighbours Meelin GAA for juvenile hurling purposes. The amalgamated club is called St Mark's in hurling and St Peter's in football.

== Honours ==
County

- Cork Junior A Hurling Championship
  - (silver) Runners-Up (1): 1998
- Cork Junior B Hurling Championship
  - (gold) Winners (1): 2022
  - (silver) Runners-Up (1): 2020
- Cork Junior B Football Championship
  - (silver) Runners-Up (2): 1998, 1992

Duhallow

- Duhallow Junior A Hurling Championship
  - (gold) Winners (6): 1988, 1997, 1998, 2000, 2001, 2005
  - (silver) Runners-Up (8): 1939, 1940, 1942, 1993, 2003, 2006, 2011, 2015
- Duhallow Junior B Hurling Championship
  - (gold) Winners (3): 2019, 2021, 2022
  - (silver) Runners-Up (1): 2020
- Duhallow Junior C Football Championship
  - (gold) Winners (1): 2024
- Duhallow Junior B Hurling League
  - (silver) Runners-Up (1): 2022
