= Meelin GAA =

Gaelic sports club in County Cork, Ireland

- Maoilinn
- Founded: 1928
- County: Cork
- Colours
- Grounds: John Joe Brosnan Memorial Park
- Coordinates: 52°16′15.98″N 9°01′22.55″W

Playing kits
Standard colours

Meelin GAA is a Gaelic Athletic Association club located in Meelin, County Cork, Ireland. The club is affiliated to the Duhallow Board and the Cork County Board. As a sister club of Rockchapel, Meelin is solely concerned with hurling.

== History ==
Located in the village of Meelin, close to the Cork-Limerick border, Meelin GAA Club was founded in 1928. The club has spent the majority of its existence operating in the junior grade, beginning in the Avondhu Division before later moving to the Duhallow Division. Meelin has since won a record 20 Duhallow JAHC titles.

Having been beaten in two previous finals, Meelin won the Cork JAHC title for the first time in their history in 2010, following a 1–19 to 2–09 win over Cloughduv in the final. The Munster Club JHC title was added shortly after, following a defeat of St Patrick's, before Meelin beat John Locke's by 0–12 to 1–05 in the 2011 All-Ireland Club JHC final.

In relation to Gaelic football, club members played with the Knockscovane club until it amalgamated fully with Meelin in 2009. Since then, players have lined out with Rockchapel. The Meelin, Rockchapel and Freemount clubs amalgamate at juvenile level and are known as St Peter's. For juvenile hurling competitions, Meelin have merged with Freemount as St Mark's.

== Honours ==
- All-Ireland Junior Club Hurling Championship (1): 2011
- Munster Junior Club Hurling Championship (1): 2010
- Cork Junior A Hurling Championship (1): 2010
- Cork Minor B Hurling Championship (1): 1993
- Duhallow Junior A Hurling Championship (20): 1939, 1940, 1941, 1943, 1970, 1971, 1972, 1973, 1977, 1980, 1981, 1982, 1986, 1990, 1991, 1993, 1994, 1996, 2009, 2010
- Duhallow Junior B Hurling Championship (4): 2007, 2008, 2011, 2024
- Duhallow Junior A Hurling League (11): 1970, 1971, 1975, 1980, 1985, 1986, 1990, 1991, 1995, 2008, 2010
- Duhallow Under-21 Hurling Championship (4): 1972, 1973, 2004, 2006

== Notable players ==
- Bernie O'Connor: All-Ireland MHC-winner (1967)
- DJ Ban O Sulliavan (Traitors Ireland contestant 2026)
