= 1895 Cork Junior Hurling Championship =

Irish hurling competition

- Champions: Blackrock (1st title)
- Runners-up: Evergreen

The 1895 Cork Junior Hurling Championship was the inaugural staging of the Cork Junior Hurling Championship since its establishment by the Cork County Board.

The final was played on 11 August 1895 at the Park in Cork, between Blackrock and Evergreen. Blackrock won the match by 1–04 to 1–01 to claim their first ever championship title in the grade.

== Results ==
=== Final ===
| 11 August 1895 Final | Blackrock | 1-04 - 1-01 | Evergreen | The Park |
| | | | | Referee: J Young |
