= Tom Kenny (hurler) =

Irish hurling coach and hurler (born 1981)

Personal information
- Native name: Tomás Ó Cionnaith (Irish)
- Born: 16 July 1981 (age 45) Grenagh, County Cork, Ireland
- Occupation: Primary school teacher
- Height: 6 ft 0 in (183 cm)

Sport
- Sport: Hurling
- Position: Midfield
Clubs
Years	Club	Apps (scores)
1998-present 2000; 2007-2014	Grenagh; Muskerry	18 (0-20)
Club titles
	Football	Hurling
Cork titles	0	0
College
- Years: College
- 2000-2006: University College Cork
College titles
- Sigerson titles: 0
- Fitzgibbon titles: 0
Inter-county*
Years	County	Apps (scores)
2003–2013	Cork	52 (1–33)
Inter-county titles
- Munster titles: 3
- All-Irelands: 2
- NHL: 0
- All Stars: 0
- *Inter County team apps and scores correct as of 21:46, 4 July 2019.

Thomas Kenny (born 16 July 1981) is an Irish hurling coach and hurler who plays for Cork Intermediate Championship club Grenagh. He played for the Cork senior hurling team for 10 years, during which time he usually lined out at midfield before ending his career at right wing-back. Kenny's midfield partnership with Jerry O'Connor is regarded as one of the greatest of all time.

Kenny began his hurling and Gaelic football career at club level with Grenagh. After success as a dual player in the minor grades, he eventually broke onto the club's top adult teams. Kenny enjoyed his first success in 2007 when Grenagh won the Intermediate Football Championship. He won a second Intermediate Football Championship title in 2013, while also claiming a Junior Hurling Championship medal the same season. Kenny's early prowess also saw him selected for University College Cork in the Sigerson and Fitzgibbon Cups as well as the Muskerry divisional team.

At inter-county level, Kenny was part of the successful Cork minor football team that won the Munster Championship in 1999 before later winning a Munster Championship with the under-21 football team in 2001 and an All-Ireland Championship medal with the junior football team the same year. He joined the Cork senior hurling team in 2002. From his debut, Kenny was ever-present at midfield and made a combined total of 116 National League and Championship appearances in a career that ended with his last game in 2013. During that time he was part of two All-Ireland Championship-winning teams – in 2004 and 2005. Kenny also secured three Munster Championship medals. He announced his retirement from inter-county hurling on 12 December 2013.

Kenny was nominated for six consecutive All-Stars between 2003 and 2008 and is regarded as one of the best Cork hurlers never to win the accolade. At inter-provincial level, he was selected to play in two championship campaigns with Munster, with his sole Railway Cup medal being won in 2013.

Kenny became involved in management and coaching following his retirement from playing. He served as a coach and selector, both in third-level competitions and in the Cork Senior Championship, with University College Cork. In June 2019, he was added to the Cork senior hurling management team.

== Playing career ==
=== St. Finbarr's College ===
Kenny first came to prominence as a hurler with St. Finbarr's College in Cork. He played in every grade of hurling and collected a Dean Ryan Cup medal in 1996 before joining the college's senior hurling team. On 7 March 1999, Kenny scored four points from midfield when St. Finbarr's College suffered a 1–14 to 1–08 defeat by St. Flannan's College from Ennis in the Harty Cup final.

=== University College Cork ===
As a commerce student at University College Cork, Kenny immediately became involved in Gaelic games. As a member of the freshers' hurling team in his first year he won an All-Ireland Championship. Kenny joined the senior hurling and Gaelic football teams during his second year. On 23 February 2002, Kenny was at right wing-forward when UCC suffered a 0–06 to 0–05 defeat by the Institute of Technology, Sligo in the Sigerson Cup final.

On 6 March 2004, Kenny captained the senior hurling team to the Fitzgibbon Cup final against the Waterford Institute of Technology. He lined out at right wing-back in the 0–11 to 0–09 defeat.

=== Grenagh ===
Kenny plays his local club hurling and Gaelic football with his local club in Grenagh and has enjoyed much success. He was regarded as a great dual player at under-age levels and he quickly joined the top team with the club. In 1999 Kenny enjoyed his first major success with Grenagh when he captured a divisional junior hurling championship winners' medal following a 2–11 to 1–11 victory over Ballinora. This was the beginning of a great decade of success for Grenagh in the Muskerry junior hurling championship.

In 2000 Kenny added a second consecutive Mid Cork junior title to his collection as Aghabullogue were defeated by 2–12 to 1–6. Grenagh completed a divisional 'double' that year as the club's football team beat Donoughmore by 0–13 to 0–4. In spite of these victories Kenny's side enjoyed little success in the wider county championship.

2001 proved to be another hugely successful year for Kenny and for Grenagh. Defeats of Donoughmore and Ballingeary gave Grenagh a second consecutive 'double' in the divisional junior championship.

After surrendering both their football and hurling titles in 2002 Grenagh bounced back in 2003. A narrow 1–14 to 2–9 win over Ballincollig gave Kenny a fourth divisional junior championship winners' medal in five years.

A fifth divisional junior hurling championship title quickly followed for Kenny in 2004 as Grenagh recorded a thrilling 0–19 to 3–9 victory over Cloughduv. The club later reached the final of the county junior championship, with Ballygarvan providing the opposition. A close game ensued, however, at the full-time whistle Kenny's side were narrowly defeated by 3–7 to 1–12.

In 2005 Kenny captured his second three-in-a-row of divisional junior hurling titles. The 2–11 to 1–7 defeat of Blarney gave him a sixth winners' medal in the championship in seven seasons.

2006 saw Grenagh surrender their divisional hurling title, however, while the club's hurlers failed the footballers enjoyed some success. A 1–10 to 1–6 defeat of Iveleary gave Kenny a second divisional junior hurling winners' medal.

In 2007 the opposite of what happened in 2006 occurred. The Grenagh footballers surrendered their title, however, the club's hurlers reached the divisional final once again. That game against Dripsey ended in a 1–15 to 2–12 draw. The replay was much more conclusive as Grenagh romped to a 2–14 to 2–7 win. It was Kenny's seventh divisional junior hurling winners' medal.

Kenny has also played in the county senior hurling championship as a member of his local Muskerry division.

=== Cork ===
==== Minor and under-21 ====
Kenny first lined out for Cork as a member of the minor hurling team during the 1999 Munster Championship. He made his only appearance for the team on 12 May 1999 when he lined out at left wing-back in a 2–16 to 2–12 defeat by Clare. On 7 July 1999, Kenny made his first appearance for the Cork minor football team. He was selected at left wing-back for the 1–18 to 1–05 defeat of Limerick. He retained his position on the starting fifteen for the Munster final on 18 July 1999 and scored a point in the 2–16 to 1–09 defeat of Kerry.

On 18 March 2000, Kenny made his first appearance for the Cork under-21 football team. He lined out at left wing-back in a 1–10 to 0–06 defeat of CLare in the Munster Championship.

Kenny was eligible for the under-21 grade again in 2002. He won a Munster Championship medal as a non-playing substitute on 21 April 2001 following a 1–12 to 0–08 defeat of Limerick in the final.

For the third successive season, Kenny was included on the Cork under-21 football team in 2003. He made his last appearance for the team on 9 March 2003 when Cork suffered a 2–09 to 0–14 defeat by Clare.

==== Junior and intermediate ====
Kenny was drafted onto both Cork junior football team and the Cork intermediate hurling team as a dual player in advance of the respective Munster Championships. He made his only appearance for the Cork intermediate hurling team on 19 June 2001 when he came on as a substitute in the 0–21 to 3–08 defeat of Waterford. Kenny made his first appearance for the Cork junior football team on 24 June 2001 when he lined out at left wing-back in a 1–13 to 1–07 defeat of Clare. He retained his position on the starting fifteen for the final on 5 July 2001 and ended the game with a winners' medal following a 0–17 to 0–11 defeat of Tipperary. After missing the subsequent All-Ireland semi-final, Kenny was restored to the left wing-back position for the All-Ireland final against Mayo. Kenny collected a winners' medal following the 1–15 to 3–07 victory.

==== Senior ====
Kenny joined the Cork senior hurling team prior to the start of the 2002 National League. He made his first appearance for the team on 16 March 2002 when he came on as a substitute for Fergal Ryan in a 1–24 to 1–12 defeat of Derry. Kenny was later included on the Cork panel for the Munster Championship.

Kenny became a dual player after being drafted onto the Cork senior football team at the start of the 2003 season. He made his first appearance for the team on 3 March 2003 when he came on as a substitute for Mícheál Ó Cróinín at full-forward in a 0–16 to 0–08 defeat of Dublin in the National Football League. Kenny made his only Munster Championship appearance on 11 May 2003 when he lined out at centre-forward in a 0–16 to 0–06 defeat by Limerick. On 8 June 2003, he made his Munster Championship debut with the Cork senior hurling team when he lined out at right wing-back in a 1–18 to 0–10 defeat of Clare. Kenny won his first Munster Championship on 29 June 2003 after scoring a point from right wing-back in a 3–16 to 3–12 defeat of Waterford in the final. On 14 September 2003, he was again at right wing-back for Cork's 1–14 to 1-11 All-Ireland final defeat by Kilkenny. Kenny ended the season by being nominated for an All-Star.

On 27 June 2004, Kenny scored three points from midfield when Cork suffered a 3–16 to 1–21 defeat by Waterford in the Munster final. In spite of this defeat, Cork later qualified for the All-Ireland final against Kilkenny. A 0–17 to 0–09 victory gave Kenny a first All-Ireland medal. He ended the season by being nominated for a second consecutive All-Star award.

Kenny won his second Munster Championship medal on 26 June 2005 after lining out at midfield in a 1–21 to 1–16 defeat of Tipperary in the final at Páirc Uí Chaoimh. On 11 September 2005, Cork faced Galway in the All-Ireland final for the first time since 1990. Kenny again partnered Jerry O'Connor at midfield as Cork won the game by 1–21 to 1–16, with Kenny collecting a second consecutive All-Ireland medal. He ended the season by being nominated for a third consecutive All-Star award.

On 25 June 2006, Kenny won his third Munster Championship medal after a 2–14 to 1–14 defeat of Tipperary for the second consecutive year in the final. Cork subsequently qualified for a fourth successive All-Ireland final, with Kilkenny providing the opposition for the third time. Kenny was at midfield for the 1–16 to 1–13 defeat. He ended the season by being nominated for a fourth successive All-Star award.

For the second time in six years, the Cork senior hurling team withdrew their services in sympathy with the Cork senior football team who had also refused to play due to the appointment of Teddy Holland as team manager and the changing of the rules regarding the selection committee. Because of this, Kenny and his teammates failed to fulfil their opening two fixtures in the 2008 National Hurling League. A third strike at the start of the 2009 National Hurling League saw him and his teammates withdraw from the panel once again before eventually returning. Kenny later said: "People might say they [the strikes] were counterproductive. But I was probably on the higher end of the scale of the experienced players and I still stand by that we were doing what needed to be done...If you feel at the time something is the right thing to do, you have to do it and that’s what we did. I think history will prove long-term that what we did served Cork well."

On 2 May 2010, Kenny lined out as midfield partner to Lorcán McLoughlin when Cork faced Galway in the National League final. He ended the game on the losing side following a 2–22 to 1–17 defeat. On 11 July 2010, Kenny scored a point from midfield in Cork's 2-15 apiece draw with Waterford in the Munster final. He was named in the same position for the replay a week later but ended the game on the losing side following the 1–16 to 1–13 defeat.

Kenny failed to command a place on the starting fifteen and became a marginal presence during the 2011 season. After Cork exited the championship he contemplated retirement, however, new manager Jimmy Barry-Murphy convinced him to remain as a role player rather than a first-choice starter.

Kenny lined out in his sixth Munster final on 14 July 2013. He was selected at left corner-back in the 0–24 to 0–15 defeat by Limerick. On 8 September 2013, Kenny came on as a 64th-minute substitute for William Egan in a 3–16 to 0–25 draw with Clare in the All-Ireland final. He was again named on the bench for the replay on 28 September 2013, but came on as a 38th-minute substitute for Daniel Kearney in the 5–16 to 3–16 defeat.

Kenny announced his retirement from inter-county hurling on 12 December 2013. He said: "I'm 32 now and I felt it was time to let other lads come through and have their chance. I'm healthy, it's not because of injury, I've had a good innings with Cork, it would have been great to go out with a third All-Ireland medal this year, but it wasn't to be."

=== Munster ===
Kenny has also lined out with Munster in the Railway Cup inter-provincial competition. He played with the province for the only time in 2008, however, Munster were defeated by Leinster on a 1–15 to 1–12 score line.

== Managerial and coaching career ==
=== University College Cork ===
Kenny, alongside his former teammate Seán Óg Ó hAilpín, was appointed joint-coach of the University College Cork fresher hurling team in August 2016. He acted as joint-coach of the team for three unsuccessful All-Ireland Freshers' Championship campaigns.

Kenny took over as coach of the University College Cork senior team for the 2018 Cork Senior Championship. He guided the team to the semi-finals of the championship where they suffered a 3–21 to 1–15 defeat by eventual champions Imokilly.

=== Cork ===
In June 2019, Kenny spent a brief period assisting Cork senior manager John Meyler and his selectors on the training ground before being officially added to the management team.

== Career statistics ==
=== Club ===
As of match played 4 May 2019.

Team	Year	Cork JHC		Munster		Total	
Team	Year	Apps	Score	Apps	Score	Apps	Score
Grenagh	1998	—		—		—	
Grenagh	1999	1	0-02	—		1	0-02
Grenagh	2000	1	0-03	—		1	0-03
Grenagh	2001	1	0-01	—		1	0-01
Grenagh	2002	—		—		—	
Grenagh	2003	3	0-07	—		3	0-07
Grenagh	2004	3	0-02	—		3	0-02
Grenagh	2005	2	0-02	—		2	0-02
Grenagh	2006	—		—		—	
Grenagh	2007	1	0-04	—		1	0-04
Grenagh	2008	—		—		—	
Grenagh	2009	—		—		—	
Grenagh	2010	—		—		—	
Grenagh	2011	—		—		—	
Grenagh	2012	1	0-03	—		1	0-03
Grenagh	2013	3	1-17	1	0-02	4	1-19
Grenagh	Total	16	1-41	1	0-02	17	1-43
Grenagh	Year	Cork IHC		Munster		Total	
Grenagh	Year	Apps	Score	Apps	Score	Apps	Score
Grenagh	2014	5	0-43	—		5	0-43
Grenagh	2015	2	0-15	—		2	0-15
Grenagh	2016	5	0-36	—		5	0-36
Grenagh	2017	3	0-09	—		3	0-09
Grenagh	2018	3	2-01	—		3	2-01
Grenagh	2019	1	0-01	—		1	0-01
Grenagh	Total	19	2-105	—		19	2-105
Career total		35	3-146	1	0-02	36	3-148

=== Division ===
Team	Year	Cork SHC	
Team	Year	Apps	Score
Muskerry	2000	3	0-00
Muskerry	Total	3	0-00
UCC	2001	3	0-01
UCC	2002	3	0-01
UCC	2003	3	0-01
UCC	2004	2	0-05
UCC	2005	4	0-04
UCC	2006	2	0-03
UCC	Total	20	0-15
Muskerry	2007	3	0-03
Muskerry	2008	1	0-01
Muskerry	2009	1	0-00
Muskerry	2010	3	0-06
Muskerry	2011	4	0-08
Muskerry	2012	2	0-00
Muskerry	2013	—	
Muskerry	2014	1	0-02
Muskerry	Total	15	0-20
Career total		38	0-35

=== Inter-county ===
Team	Year	National League			Munster		All-Ireland		Total	
Team	Year	Division	Apps	Score	Apps	Score	Apps	Score	Apps	Score
Cork	2002	Division 1B	2	0-00	0	0-00	0	0-00	2	0-00
Cork	2003	Division 1B	4	0-01	2	0-01	3	0-00	9	0-02
Cork	2004	Division 1B	8	0-04	3	0-03	4	1-02	15	1-09
Cork	2005	Division 1B	7	1-09	2	0-00	3	0-04	12	1-13
Cork	2006	Division 1A	4	0-08	2	0-02	3	0-03	9	0-13
Cork	2007	Division 1A	6	0-06	2	0-03	3	0-03	11	0-12
Cork	2008	Division 1A	6	0-08	1	0-01	4	0-05	11	0-14
Cork	2009	Division 1	4	0-05	1	0-01	2	0-00	7	0-06
Cork	2010	Division 1	7	0-05	2	0-01	2	0-03	11	0-09
Cork	2011	Division 1	7	1-01	1	0-00	2	0-01	10	1-02
Cork	2012	Division 1A	5	0-00	1	0-00	4	0-00	10	0-00
Cork	2013	Division 1A	4	0-00	2	0-00	3	0-00	9	0-00
Career total			64	2-47	19	0-12	33	1-21	116	3-80

== Honours ==
University College Cork

- All-Ireland Freshers' Hurling Championship (1): 2001

Grenagh

- Cork Intermediate Football Championship (2): 2007, 2013
- Cork Junior Hurling Championship (1): 2013
- Mid Cork Junior A Hurling Championship (9): 1999, 2000, 2001, 2003, 2004, 2005, 2007, 2012, 2013
- Mid Cork Junior A Football Championship (3): 2000, 2001, 2006

Cork

- All-Ireland Senior Hurling Championship (2): 2004, 2005
- Munster Senior Hurling Championship (3): 2003, 2005, 2006
- All-Ireland Junior Football Championship (1): 2001
- Munster Junior Football Championship (1): 2001
- Munster Under-21 Football Championship (1): 2001
- Munster Minor Football Championship (1): 1999

Munster

- Railway Cup (1): 2013
