= Noel O'Leary =

Irish Gaelic footballer

Personal information
- Native name: Nollaig Ó Laoire (Irish)
- Born: 5 May 1982 (age 44) Kilnamartyra, County Cork, Ireland
- Occupation: Sales rep
- Height: 5 ft 11 in (180 cm)

Sport
- Sport: Gaelic Football
- Position: Right wing-back
Club
- Years: Club
- Cill na Martra
Club titles
- Cork titles: 0
Inter-county*
Years	County	Apps (scores)
2000–2013	Cork	42 (1–77)
Inter-county titles
- Munster titles: 3
- All-Irelands: 1
- NFL: 4
- All Stars: 0
- *Inter County team apps and scores correct as of 19:12, 17 October 2013.

Noel O'Leary (born 5 May 1982) is an Irish Gaelic footballer who played as a left wing-back for the Cork senior team.

Born in Kilnamartyra, County Cork, O Leary arrived on the inter-county scene at the age of seventeen when he first linked up with the Cork minor team, before later joining the under-21 and junior sides. He made his debut in the 2000 National Football League. O'Leary went on to play a key part for over a decade, and won one All-Ireland medal, three Munster medals and four National Football League medals(1 division 2). He was an All-Ireland runner-up on two occasions.

O'Leary represented the Munster inter-provincial team on one occasion, when he captained the team in an unsuccessful campaign. At club level he plays with Cill na Martra.

Throughout his career, O'Leary made 42 championship appearances for Cork. He announced his retirement from inter-county football on 17 October 2013.

== Playing career ==
=== Club ===
O'Leary plays his local club football with his local club in Cill na Martra and has enjoyed some success.

In 1999 he won a Cork Minor C Football Championship with the club.

In 2002 O'Leary enjoyed his first major success with Cill na Martra when he captured a divisional junior football championship winners' medal following a 2–10 to 1–9 victory over Grenagh.

2003 saw Cill na Martra reach the divisional final for the second year in succession. Ballingeary provided the opposition, however, their near neighbours could not match Cill na Martra's skill. A 0–12 to 1–7 score line gave O'Leary a second divisional winners' medal. Cill na Martra later represented their division in the county junior championship. They reached the final that year and lined out against Carbery Rangers. A 0–10 to 0–5 score line resulted in defeat for O'Leary's side.

=== Minor and under-21 ===
O'Leary first came to prominence on the inter-county scene as a member of the Cork under-16 team. He won a Munster title in this grade before going on to enjoy much more success with the Cork footballers at more advanced grades.

By 1999 O'Leary had joined the Cork minor football team, playing corner back for the entire campaign. Because of this he collected his first Munster minor winners' medal. Cork trounced Kerry by 2–16 to 1–9 on that occasion, however, 'the Rebels' were subsequently defeated in the All-Ireland semi-final.

In 2000 O'Leary secured a place in the half-back line on the Cork minor football team and Cork qualified for a second consecutive Munster decider. That year he won his first provincial winners' medal on the field of play following a 1–13 ro 0–14 defeat of arch-rivals Kerry. Cork later qualified for the All-Ireland final, with Mayo providing the opposition. A close game followed, however, at the full-time whistle Cork were the champions by 2–12 to 0–13. The win gave O'Leary an All-Ireland minor winners' medal in his last appearance for Cork in that grade.

By 2001 O'Leary was an automatic choice for the Cork under-21 team. That year he won a Munster title in that grade following a 1–12 to 0–8 defeat of Limerick. Cork were subsequently defeated in the All-Ireland semi-final. O'Leary enjoyed no further success with the county under-21 footballers.

=== Junior ===
In 2001, he won Munster and All Ireland Championship medals with the Cork Junior team.

=== Senior ===
He first joined the Cork senior team during the 2000/01 National Football League.

In 2003 O'Leary made his senior championship debut for Cork. 'The Rebels' were trounced by Limerick on that occasion. The year went from bad to worse as Cork crashed out of the championship in the All-Ireland qualifiers.

In 2004 O'Leary's side fared no better. After losing to Kerry in the Munster semi-final Cork had to manoeuvre through the qualifiers again. He subsequently played no part due to injury for the remainder of the championship in an unconvincing victory over Clare which was followed by a humiliating 0–18 to 0–12 defeat by Fermanagh.

By 2005 the Cork footballers had regrouped and reached the Munster final for the first time in three years. Once again Kerry, the reigning All-Ireland champions, provided the opposition. The game was a close affair, however, O'Leary's side were narrowly defeated by just 1–11 to 0–11. This did not mean the end of Cork's All-Ireland ambitions. After winning their next two games 'the Rebels' qualified for an All-Ireland semi-final meeting with Kerry. In an embarrassing game of football for Cork, O'Leary's side were trounced by thirteen points on a score line of 1–19 to 0–9.

In 2006 O'Leary played no part in the team's 1–12 to 0–9 defeat of Kerry in the Munster final. The quirks of the championship saw Cork face Kerry again in the subsequent All-Ireland semi-final for the third time in five seasons. O'Leary played in that game, however, in a similar pattern to previous encounters Cork failed to beat Kerry at Croke Park. A 0–16 to 0–10 score line resulted in Cork being knocked out of the championship.

In 2007 Cork were out to atone for their defeats by Kerry the previous year. Both sides met in the provincial decider for the third year in succession. Cork gave a good account of themselves, however, Kerry could not be beaten and O'Leary's side went down on a 1–15 to 1–13 score line. Cork later did well in the subsequent All-Ireland series and finally qualified for the All-Ireland final after an eight-year absence. There was some doubt over O'Leary's participation in the game as he had been caught on television cameras striking Graham Geraghty in the All-Ireland semi-final against Meath. In the end he was cleared to play, however, in a cruel twist Kerry were the opponents. While the first half was played on an even keel, 'the Kingdom' ran riot in the second half and a rout ensued. Goalkeeper Alan Quirke came in for much criticism after conceding some easy goals. At the full-time whistle Cork were trounced by 3–13 to 1–9.

In 2008 Cork gained a modicum of revenge on Kerry when the sides met again in that year's Munster final. O'Leary, however, played no part due to injury in the remarkable 1–16 to 1–11 victory. Both sides met again in the All-Ireland semi-final with OLeary at wing back, however, after a thrilling draw and a replay Kerry were the team that advanced to the championship decider.

In 2009 Cork were earmarked as potential All-Ireland contenders. After drawing with Kerry in the provincial semi-final the replay proved much more conclusive and ended in a victory for 'the Rebels'. The game was not without incident as O'Leary was sent to the line for blowing Paul Galvin to the ground with a beautiful right hook. The Kerry player was also red-carded for starting the episode. Because of this O'Leary missed Cork's subsequent Munster final triumph over Limerick.

On 17 October 2013 O'Leary announced his retirement from Inter-County Football.

== Honours ==
Cill na Martra

- Cork Intermediate A Football Championship: 2018
- Mid Cork Junior A Football Championship: 2002, 2003

Cork

- All-Ireland Senior Football Championship: 2010
- Munster Senior Football Championship: 2002, 2006, 2008, 2009, 2012
- National Football League Division 1: 2010, 2011, 2012
- National Football League Division 2: 2009
- All-Ireland Junior Football Championship: 2001
- Munster Junior Football Championship: 2001
- Munster Under-21 Football Championship: 2001
- All-Ireland Minor Football Championship: 2000
- Munster Minor Football Championship: 1999, 2000
