= Peter O'Brien (hurler) =

Irish hurler (born 1987)

Personal information
- Native name: Peadar Ó Brian (Irish)
- Born: 1987 (age 38–39) Kildorrery, County Cork, Ireland
- Occupation: Sales rep
- Height: 5 ft 11 in (180 cm)

Sport
- Sport: Hurling
- Position: Centre-forward
Clubs
Years	Club	Apps (scores)
2005-present 2006-2016	Kildorrery → Avondhu	20 (6-88)
Club titles
- Cork titles: 0
College
- Years: College
- 2005-2009: NUI Galway
College titles
- Fitzgibbon titles: 0
Inter-county*
Years	County	Apps (scores)
2013	Cork	0 (0-00)
Inter-county titles
- Munster titles: 0
- All-Irelands: 0
- NHL: 0
- All Stars: 0
- *Inter County team apps and scores correct as of 3 March 2021.

Peter O'Brien (born 1987) is an Irish hurler who plays for Cork Intermediate Championship club Kildorrery and is a former member of the Cork senior hurling team. He usually lines out as a centre-forward.

== Career statistics ==
=== Club ===
As of match played 27 September 2020.

Team	Year	Cork JAHC		Munster		All-Ireland		Total	
Team	Year	Apps	Score	Apps	Score	Apps	Score	Apps	Score
Kildorrery	2005	—		—		—		—	
Kildorrery	2006	—		—		—		—	
Kildorrery	2007	—		—		—		—	
Kildorrery	2008	—		—		—		—	
Kildorrery	2009	—		—		—		—	
Kildorrery	2010	—		—		—		—	
Kildorrery	2011	—		—		—		—	
Kildorrery	2012	4	3-30	2	3-15	1	0-07	7	6-52
Kildorrery	Total	4	3-30	2	3-15	1	0-07	7	6-52
Kildorrery	Year	Cork IHC		Munster		All-Ireland		Total	
Kildorrery	Year	Apps	Score	Apps	Score	Apps	Score	Apps	Score
Kildorrery	2013	2	0-21	—		—		2	0-21
Kildorrery	2014	5	1-47	—		—		5	1-47
Kildorrery	2015	3	1-21	—		—		2	1-21
Kildorrery	2016	6	2-55	—		—		6	2-55
Kildorrery	2017	3	0-21	—		—		3	0-21
Kildorrery	2018	2	1-14	—		—		2	1-14
Kildorrery	2019	3	0-19	—		—		3	0-19
Kildorrery	2020	4	1-38	—		—		4	1-38
Kildorrery	2021	3	0-18	—		—		3	0-18
Kildorrery	Total	31	6-254	—		—		31	6-254
Career total		32	9-266	2	3-15	1	0-07	35	12-278

=== Inter-county ===
Team	Year	National League			Munster		All-Ireland		Total	
Team	Year	Division	Apps	Score	Apps	Score	Apps	Score	Apps	Score
Cork	2013	Division 1A	3	0-01	—		—		3	0-01
Total			3	0-01	—		—		3	0-01

== Honours ==
Kildorrery

- Munster Junior Club Hurling Championship: 2012
- Cork Junior A Hurling Championship; 2012
- North Cork Junior A Hurling Championship: 2012

Cork

- All-Ireland Intermediate Hurling Championship: 2015
- Munster Intermediate Hurling Championship: 2015
- Munster Minor Hurling Championship: 2004, 2005
