= 2013 Cork Intermediate Football Championship =

Gaelic football competition

- Teams: 16
- Sponsor: Evening Echo
- Champions: Grenagh (2nd title); Paul McCarthy (captain)
- Runners-up: Aghabullogue; Mark O'Brien (captain)

The 2013 Cork Intermediate Football Championship was the 78th staging of the Cork Intermediate Football Championship since its establishment by the Cork County Board in 1909.

The final was played on 8 December 2013 at Páirc Uí Rinn in Cork, between Grenagh and Aghabullogue, in what was their first ever meeting in the final. Grenagh won the match by 0–12 to 0–05 to claim their second championship title overall and a first title in six years.

== Results ==
=== Quarter-finals ===
17 August 2013 Quarter-final	Aghabullogue	2-10 - 1-08	Youghal	Mayfield Grounds
	J Corkery (0-6, 3fs), R Dennehy and P Finnegan (1-0 each), G Long (0-2, 1f), R O’Keeffe and S O’Sullivan (0-1 each).	Report	P Moylan (0-6, 2fs), A Daly, A Frahill O’Connor, P Kelly, C O’Sullivan, N Roche (0-1 each).

17 August 2013 Quarter-final	Rockchapel	4-07 - 1-14	Éire Óg	Dromtarriffe
	I Guiney 2-3(0-2f), S Hickey 1-1, L Collins 0-2, K Burke 1-0, M Stack 0- 1.	Report	J Dineen 1-4, D Goulding 0-7 (0-1’45, 0-1f), K Hallissey, C Sheehan and A O’Connor 0-1 each.

26 October 2013 Quarter-final	Grenagh	0-15 - 0-09	Ballydesmond	Kanturk Grounds
	DD Dorgan 0-10 (0-7f), G Russell 0-2f, L Walsh 0-2, S Dorgan 0-1.	Report	D O’Connor 0-5 (0-3f), P Breen 0-2, N Fleming and S Kelly 0-1 each.

13 November 2013 Quarter-final	Glanworth	2-11 - 2-06	Kanturk	Mallow GAA Complex
	P O'Driscoll 1-6, M Sheehan 1-0, D Colfer 0-2, M Pierce 0-1, D Pyne 0-1, G O'Neill 0-1.		D Duane 0-5, A O'Keeffe 1-0, C Boyce 1-0, A Walsh 0-1.

=== Semi-finals ===
1 December 2013 Semi-final	Aghabullogue	0-12 - 1-06	Glanworth	Mallow GAA Complex
	J Corkery 0-9, P Finnegan 0-2, M Long 0-1.		M Sheehan 1-0, D Pyne 0-2, D Gallagher 0-1, P O'Driscoll 0-1, S Finn 0-1, G O'Neill 0-1.

1 December 2013 Semi-final	Grenagh	1-11 - 1-06	Rockchapel	Banteer Sportsfield
	DD Dorgan (0-5, four frees), U Duggan (1-1), T Kenny and G Russell (0-2 each), C O’Neill (0-1).	Report	S Hickey (1-2), I Guiney (0-2, frees), L Collins and T Collins (45m) (0-1 each).

=== Final ===
8 December 2013 Final	Grenagh	0-12 - 0-05	Aghabullogue	Páirc Uí Rinn
	DD Dorgan 0-6 (two frees), C Fitzgerald, J Russell 0-2 each, G Russell (free), L Walsh 0-1 each.	Report	J Corkery 0-4 (two frees), J Kelleher 0-1 (free).	Referee: B Coniry (Crosshaven)
