= 2013 All-Ireland Intermediate Hurling Championship =

Championship Details
- Dates: 2 June 2013 – 31 August 2013
- Teams: 7

All Ireland Champions
- Winners: Tipperary (7th win)
- Captain: David Young
- Manager: Michael Ryan

All Ireland Runners-up
- Runners-up: Kilkenny
- Captain: Shane Prendergast
- Manager: Pat O'Grady

Provincial Champions
- Munster: Tipperary
- Leinster: Kilkenny
- Ulster: Not Played
- Connacht: Not Played

Championship Statistics
- Total Goals: 9 (1.5 per game)
- Total Points: 180 (25.7 per game)
- Top Scorer: Timmy Hammersley (0-21)

The 2013 All-Ireland Intermediate Hurling Championship was the 30th staging of the All-Ireland hurling championship since its establishment by the Gaelic Athletic Association in 1961. The championship began on 2 June 2013 and ended on 31 August 2013.

Tipperary were the defending champions and successfully retained the title after defeating Kilkenny by 2–14 to 2–11 in the All-Ireland final.

== Team summaries ==
Team	Colours	Most recent success	
Team	Colours	All-Ireland	Provincial
Clare	Saffron and blue		2011
Cork	Red and white	2009	2010
Galway	Maroon and white	2002	2008
Kilkenny	Black and amber	2010	2012
Limerick	Green and white	1998	2008
Tipperary	Blue and gold	2012	2012
Waterford	White and blue		2007

== Results ==
=== Munster Intermediate Hurling Championship ===
2 June 2013 Quarter-final	Clare	2-21 - 0-16	Waterford	Semple Stadium
	G Guilfoyle 1-5 (0-4fs), A Lynch 1-4, C Malone 0-5, P Sheehan 0-3, M O'Neill 0-2, N Arthur, C O'Connell 0-1 each.	Report	K Fitzgerald 0-8 (0-7fs), S Roche 0-3, C Heffernan 0-2, E Murphy, S Ryan, J Lyons 0-1 each.	Referee: J O'Brien (Tipperary)

9 June 2013 Semi-final	Limerick	0-15 - 0-20	Tipperary	Gaelic Grounds
	J Aherne 0-7 (6f), W Griffin 0-2, C McNamara 0-2 (1f, 1 65) J Hayes, P Leahy, P Begley & M Ryan 0-1.	Report	T Hammersley 0-10 (6f, 1 65), J McLoughney 0-3 (1 sl), P Molloy 0-2, W Ryan, O Quirke, R Gleeson, P Greene & P O’Leary 0-1.	Referee: P Foley (Waterford)

23 June 2013 Semi-final	Cork	2-13 - 1-9	Clare	Gaelic Grounds
	P O'Brien 0-7 (5fs), C Casey 2-0, M Kennifick 0-2, M Coleman (f), B Lawton, A Watson 0-1 each.	Report	A Lynch 1-1, A O'Neill (2fs), N Arthur (1f, 1 '65'), C O'Connell (1f), J Shanahan, 0-2 each.	Referee: P Casey (Waterford)

19 July 2013 Final	Tipperary	0-19 - 0-18	Cork	Semple Stadium
	T Hammersley (0-6, five frees); D Egan (0-3, three frees); O Quirke (0-2); D O’Hanlon (0-2); R Gleeson (0-2); J McLoughney (0-2, one free); T Butler, P Shortt (0-1 each).	Report	P O’Brien (0-12, 11 frees); B Lawton (0-2); C Casey (0-2); M Coleman, M Kennefick (0-1 each).	Referee: D Fox (Clare)

=== All-Ireland Intermediate Hurling Championship ===
17 August 2014 Semi-final	Galway	0-8 - 0-16	Kilkenny	Semple Stadium
	D Joyce, N Keary (1f), S Moloney (2fs) 0-2 each, E Concannon, J Carr 0-1 each.	Report	R Hickey 0-6 (4fs, 1 '65'), J Brennan 0-5, J Farrell 0-2, D Langton, B Beckett, B Kennedy 0-1 each.	Referee: J Sexton (Cork)

31 August 2013 Final	Kilkenny	2-11 - 2-14	Tipperary	Nowlan Park
	J Farrell (2-0); R Hickey (0-5, 3f); L Harney, C Phelan, D Langton, J Brennan, D Walton, P Holden (0-1 each).	Report	R Gleeson (2-1); T Hammersley (0-5, 2f, 1, 65); N O’Meara (0-4); D Fox (0-1f); W Ryan, D O’Hanlon, C Kenny (0-1 each).	Referee: T Carroll (Offaly)

== Statistics ==
=== Top scorers ===
Overall

Rank	Player	County	Tally	Total	Matches	Average
1	Timmy Hammersley	Tipperary	0-21	21	3	7.00
2	Peter O'Brien	Cork	0-19	19	2	9.50
3	Aidan Lynch	Clare	2-5	11	2	5.50
3	Rory Hickey	Kilkenny	0-11	11	2	5.50
5	Ruairí Gleeson	Tipperary	2-4	10	3	3.33

Single game

Rank	Player	County	Tally	Total	Opposition
1	Peter O'Brien	Cork	0-12	12	Tipperary
2	Timmy Hammersley	Tipperary	0-10	10	Limerick
3	Gary Guilfoyle	Clare	1-5	8	Waterford
3	Killian Fitzgerald	Waterford	0-8	8	Clare
5	Ruairí Gleeson	Tipperary	2-1	7	Kilkenny
5	Aidan Lynch	Clare	1-4	7	Waterford
5	Jack Aherne	Limerick	0-7	7	Tipperary
5	Peter O'Brien	Cork	0-7	7	Clare
9	Colm Casey	Cork	2-0	6	Clare
9	Jonjo Farrell	Kilkenny	2-0	6	Tipperary
9	Timmy Hammersley	Tipperary	0-6	6	Cork
9	Rory Hickey	Kilkenny	0-6	6	Galway

=== Scoring ===
- First goal of the championship
  - Aidan Lynch for Clare against Waterford (Munster quarter-final)
- Widest winning margin: 11 points
  - Clare 2-21 - 0-16 Waterford (Munster quarter-final)
- Most goals in a match: 4
  - Tipperary 2-14 - 2-11 Kilkenny (All-Ireland final)
- Most points in a match: 37
  - Clare 2-21 - 0-16 Waterford (Munster quarter-final)
  - Tipperary 0-19 - 0-18 Cork (Munster final)
- Most goals by one team in a match: 2
  - Clare 2-21 - 0-16 Waterford (Munster quarter-final)
  - Cork 2-13 - 1-9 Clare (Munster semi-final)
  - Tipperary 2-14 - 2-11 Kilkenny (All-Ireland final)
- Highest aggregate score: 43
  - Clare 2-21 - 0-16 Waterford (Munster quarter-final)
- Most goals scored by a losing team: 2
  - Kilkenny 2-11 - 2-14 Tipperary (All-Ireland final)
