= 2014 Cork Intermediate Hurling Championship =

Irish hurling competition

- Dates: 31 May – 26 October 2014
- Teams: 16
- Sponsor: Evening Echo
- Champions: Fermoy (1st title); Brian O'Sullivan (captain); Denis Ring (manager)
- Runners-up: Charleville; Brendan Dennehy (captain); Peter Finn (manager)
- Relegated: St. Catherine's

Tournament statistics
- Matches played: 31
- Goals scored: 86 (2.77 per match)
- Points scored: 882 (28.45 per match)
- Top scorer(s): Peter O'Brien (1-47)

The 2014 Cork Intermediate Hurling Championship was the 105th staging of the Cork Intermediate Hurling Championship since its establishment by the Cork County Board in 1909. The draw for the opening rounds took place on 15 December 2013. The championship ran from 31 May to 26 October 2014.

The final was played on 26 October 2014 at Páirc Uí Chaoimh in Cork, between Fermoy and Charleville, in what was their first ever meeting in the final. Fermoy won the match by 2–14 to 1–16 to claim their first ever championship title.

Kildorrery's Peter O'Brien was the championship's top scorer with 1-47.

== Team changes ==
=== To Championship ===
Promoted from the Cork Junior A Hurling Championship

- Grenagh

Relegated from the Cork Premier Intermediate Hurling Championship

- Ballincollig

=== From Championship ===
Promoted to the Cork Premier Intermediate Hurling Championship

- Kanturk

Relegated to the North Cork Junior A Hurling Championship

- Dromina

== Results ==
=== First round ===
31 May 2014 First round	Grenagh	2-18 - 0-10	Dripsey	Blarney Grounds
	T Kenny 0-11, U Duggan 1-2, T Walsh 1-0, C O'Neill 0-3, E O'Donovan 0-1, S Coleman 0-1.		D O'Riordan 0-8, D O'Sullivan 0-1, M O'Sullivan 0-1.

31 May 2014 First round	Éire Óg	1-16 - 0-12	St. Catherine's	Riverstown Sportsfield
	K Hallissey 1-4, P McDonagh 0-3, D Goulding 0-3, C Murphy 0-3, D O'Connor 0-1, J Dineen 0-1, D O'Herlihy 0-1.		S O'Brien 0-6, S Cotter 0-3, M Mulcahy 0-2, P Roche 0-1.

31 May 2014 First round	Aghada	2-21 - 1-12	Fr. O'Neill's	Christy Ring Memorial Park
	W Leahy 0-10, C Fleming 2-1, P O'Neill 0-4, T Hartnett 0-3, S O'Keeffe 0-1, B Hennessy 0-1, J Looney 0-1.		D Dalton 1-8, B Dunne 0-2, J Millerick 0-1, P McMahon 0-1.

1 June 2014 First round	Aghabullogue	0-12 - 2-18	Meelin	Mallow GAA Complex
	M O'Flynn 0-7, P Twomey 0-2, G Murphy 0-2, J Corkery 0-1.		DJ O'Sullivan 0-7, J Curtin 1-2, W Buckley 1-0, W Murphy 0-3, B O'Sullivan 0-2, J O'Callaghan 0-2, J Forrest 0-1, SM O'Sullivan 0-1.

7 June 2014 First round	Argideen Rangers	0-19 - 1-09	Barryroe	Ahamilla Complex
	JM O'Callaghan 0-6, J Sheehan 0-5, R O'Sullivan 0-3, F Butler 0-2, J Murphy 0-2, M Walsh 0-1.		K Griffin 1-5, T Harrington 0-2, D O'Sullivan 0-1, M O'Brien 0-1.

7 June 2014 First round	Ballygarvan	0-11 - 1-16	Ballincollig	Charlie Hurley Park
	M Kennefick 0-3, M O'Riordan 0-2, G White 0-2, Damien O'Sullivan 0-2, D McCarthy 0-2.		E Ryan 1-2, C O'Sullivan 0-3, D Bowen 0-2, F Kelly 0-2, A O'Donovan 0-2, C Moore 0-1, N Allen 0-1, C O'Donovan 0-1, C Sexton 0-1,

7 June 2014 First round	Milford	0-14 - 0-20	Charleville	Gaels Memorial Grounds
	P O'Regan 0-8, A Watson 0-2, S O'Connell 0-2, H O'Gorman 0-1, B Higgins 0-1.		A Cagney 0-7, A Dennehy 0-3, D Flynn 0-2, A O'Connor 0-2, M Gammell 0-2, B Casey 0-2, D Murphy 0-1, F O'Callaghan 0-1.

7 June 2014 First round	Fermoy	1-18 - 0-18	Kildorrery	Castletownroche Grounds
	L Coleman 0-8, D Geary 1-2, R O'Hagan 0-5, K Morrison 0-2, J Hutchings 0-1.		P O'Brien 0-15, A O'Brien 0-2, S Coughlan 0-1.

=== Second round ===
14 June 2014 Second round	Aghabullogue	3-14 - 2-10	Dripsey	Cloughduv Grounds
	P Finnegan 1-4, J Corkery 1-2, D Twomey 1-2, G Murphy 0-2, M O'Flynn 0-2, I Barry-Murphy 0-1, S O'Sullivan 0-1.		C Hayes 1-0, P O'Riordan 1-0, A Buckley 0-3, D O'Sullivan 0-2, S Burke 0-1, M O'Riordan 0-1, M O'Sullivan 0-1, D Buckley 0-1, G Murphy 0-1.

21 June 2014 Second round	Barryroe	3-11 - 2-16	Milford	Ballyanly Grounds
	M O'Brien 2-0, J O'Donovan 0-4, C Hurley 1-0, T Harrington 0-3, D O'Sullivan 0-2, H O'Gorman 0-1, G Whelton 0-1.		P O'Regan 0-10, S O'Connell 1-4, J Cremin 1-0, H O'Gorman 0-2.

21 June 2014 Second round	Kildorrery	3-15 - 0-15	Fr. O'Neill's	Felix Sarsfield Memorial Park
	A O'Brien 2-5, P O'Brien 0-4, S Kelly 1-0, E O'Connor 0-3, D Kelly 0-2, S O'Gorman 0-1.		D Dalton 0-7, R Cullinane 0-3, P Butler 0-1, L O'Driscoll 0-1, J Millerick 0-1, P McMahon 0-1, R Murphy 0-1.

29 June 2014 Second round	St. Catherine's	1-09 - 2-12	Ballygarvan	Caherlag Grounds
	S Kearney 0-4, S O'Farrell 1-0, M Mulcahy 0-3, P Roche 0-1, D Mangan 0-1.		D McCarthy 2-3, M Kennefick 0-6, G Spillane 0-1, R Cassidy 0-1, l D O'Sullivan 0-1.

=== Third round ===
4 July 2014 Third round	Barryroe	0-14 - 0-12	St. Catherine's	Páirc Uí Rinn
	J O'Donovan 0-5, K Griffin 0-4, M O'Brien 0-3, K Hurley 0-1, D O'Sullivan 0-1.		S Farrell 0-3, S Cotter 0-3, D Mangan 0-3, S Kearney 0-1, C Aherne 0-1, B Davis 0-1.

5 July 2014 Third round	Dripsey	1-13 - 2-18	Fr. O'Neill's	Páirc Uí Rinn
	D O'Riordan 0-7, S Murray 1-0, G Murphy 0-2, D O'Sullivan 0-2, M O'Sullivan 0-1, A Buckley 0-1.		K O'Sullivan 1-2, R Cullinane 1-2, L O'Driscoll 0-4, P McMahon 0-4, J Millerick 0-4, B Dunne 0-1, P Higgins 0-1.

=== Relegation playoff ===
13 September 2014 Playoff	Dripsey	3-10 - 2-11	St. Catherine's	Riverstown Sportsfield
	D O'Riordan 0-7, D O'Sullivan 2-0, G Murphy 1-2, D Buckley 0-1.		D Mangan 1-7, S O'Farrell 1-0, B Mulcahy 0-2, C Aherne 0-1, M Mulcahy 0-1.

=== Fourth round ===
2 August 2014 Fourth round	Kildorrery	3-17 - 0-22	Milford	Dr Mannix Sportsfield
	P O'Brien 0-11, D Kelly 2-0, A O'Brien 1-0, E O'Connor 0-3, S Coughlan 0-1, T Condon 0-1, J O'Gorman 0-1.		P Regan 0-8, A Watson 0-4, S O'Connell 0-3, E Dillon 0-3, J O'Brien 0-2, S O'Connor 0-1, H O'Gorman 0-1.

2 August 2014 Fourth round	Grenagh	2-14 - 1-15	Argideen Rangers	Ballymartle Grounds
	T Kenny 0-7, S Coleman 1-0, N Doherty 1-0, U Duggan 0-3, L Walsh 0-1, E Ryan 0-1, T Walsh 0-1, S Bourke 0-1.		B Hennessy 1-1, J Sheehan 0-4, J Murphy 0-2, E O'Brien 0-2, J O'Callaghan 0-2, R O'Sullivan 0-2, F Butler 0-1, C O'Brien 0-1.

16 August 2014 Fourth round	Fermoy	2-14 - 2-14	Fr. O'Neill's	St Catherine's Park
	J Millerick 0-6, B Dunne 1-1, G O'Leary 1-0, P McMahon 0-3, D Dalton 0-2, L O'Driscoll 0-1, S O'Connor 0-1.		A O'Connor 1-1, D Geary 1-1, L Coleman 0-3, K Morrison 0-3, B O'Sullivan 0-2, T Clancy 0-2, J Hutchings 0-1, R O'Hagan 0-1.

16 August 2014 Fourth round	Ballygarvan	1-09 - 0-17	Aghabullogue	Páirc Uí Rinn
	D McCarthy 1-5, M O'Riordan 0-2, S White 0-1, W McCarthy 0-1.		M O'Flynn 0-10, J Corkery 0-3, J Buckley 0-1, G Murphy 0-1, Donal Twomey 0-1, I Barry-Murphy 0-1, Dan Twomey 0-1.

21 August 2014 Fourth round	Charleville	0-15 - 1-09	Ballincollig	Mallow GAA Complex
	A Cagney 0-5, D O'Flynn 0-5, D Murphy 0-2, M Gammell 0-1, A Dennehy 0-1, J O'Brien 0-1.		D Bowen 0-5, N Allen 1-0, F Kelly 0-2, C O'Sullivan 0-1, C Sexton 0-1.

23 August 2014 Fourth round	Barryroe	4-10 - 2-21	Éire Óg	Charlie Hurley Park
	M O'Brien 1-1, D O'Sullivan 1-1, J O'Donovan 0-4, C Cahalane 1-0, T Harrington 1-0, K Griffin 0-2, C Hurley 0-1, D Harrington 0-1.		C Murphy 0-9, D Goulding 1-5, J Dineen 1-1, P McDonagh 0-2, M O'Shea 0-2, R O'Toole 0-1, D O'Connor 0-1.

24 August 2014 Fourth round replay	Fermoy	4-14 - 1-10	Fr. O'Neill's	St Catherine's Park
	D Geary 1-5, A O'Connor 2-1, J Hutchings 1-1, T Clancy 0-2, R O'Hagan 0-1, P de Róiste 0-1, M Brennan 0-1, K Morrison 0-1, J Ring 0-1.		D Dalton 0-4, M O'Keeffe 1-0, J Millerick 0-2, L O'Driscoll 0-1, G O'Leary 0-1, P McMahon 0-1, B Dunne 0-1.

- Aghada and Meelin received byes in this round.

=== Quarter-finals ===
23 August 2014 Quarter-final	Aghada	2-19 - 2-12	Meelin	Mourneabbey Grounds
	J Looney 0-8, W Leahy 1-3, C Fleming 1-1, A Stafford 0-3, G Melvin 0-1, B Hennessy 0-1, S O'Keeffe 0-1, T O'Keeffe 0-1.		DJ O'Sullivan 0-7, W Murphy 1-0, Jerry Forrest 1-0, L Collins 0-2, J Curtin 0-1, B Collins 0-1, James Forrest 0-1.

30 August 2014 Quarter-final	Grenagh	0-14 - 1-11	Kildorrery	Fr Con Buckley Park
	T Kenny 0-11, J Cronin 0-2, D Dorgan 0-1.		P O'Brien 0-8, E O'Connor 1-0, D Kelly 0-1, S Kelly 0-1, F Stapleton 0-1.

30 August 2014 Quarter-final	Charleville	0-24 - 0-10	Aghabullogue	Mourneabbey Grounds
	A Cagney 0-8, A Dennehy 0-6, J O'Brien 0-3, D O'Flynn 0-2, J Kennedy 0-2, A O'Connor 0-1, M Kavanagh 0-1, J O'Sullivan 0-1.		M O'Flynn 0-4, John Corkery 0-2, K Finnegan 0-2, J Buckley 0-1, I Barry-Murphy 0-1.

30 August 2014 Quarter-final	Éire Óg	3-11 - 3-11	Fermoy	Páirc Uí Rinn
	D Geary 1-5, J Hutchings 2-0, R O'Hagan 0-2, B O'Sullivan 0-1, K Morrison 0-1, A O'Connor 0-1, L Coleman 0-1.		D Goulding 1-3, P McDonagh 1-1, L Murphy 1-0, C Murphy 0-3, J Dineen 0-2, D O'Connor 0-1, K Hallissey 0-1.

13 September 2014 Quarter-final replay	Éire Óg	1-09 - 3-14	Fermoy	Páirc Uí Rinn
	K Hallissey 1-4, L Murphy 0-1, C Murphy 0-1, P McDonagh 0-1, J Dineen 0-1, R O'Toole 0-1.		L Coleman 0-8, T Clancy 1-1, R O'Hagan 1-1, J Hutchings 1-1, D Geary 0-3, P de Róiste 0-1.

20 September 2014 Quarter-final replay	Grenagh	2-18 - 1-17	Kildorrery	Fr Con Buckley Park
	T Kenny 0-9, S Bourke 2-2, DD Dorgan 0-3, C O'Neill 0-2, U Duggan 0-1, S Cronin 0-1.		P O'Brien 1-9, A O'Brien 0-3, J O'Gorman 0-2, F Stapleton 0-1, W Fouhy 0-1, S Coughlan 0-1.

=== Semi-finals ===
26 September 2014 Semi-final	Charleville	2-17 - 0-10	Aghada	Páirc Uí Rinn
	J O'Brien 2-3, A Cagney 0-9, 0-5 frees, D Fitzgibbon, M Kavanagh, A O'Connor, D O'Flynn and A Dennehy, free, 0-1 each	Report	J Looney 0-4, 0-3 frees, S O'Keeffe 0-2, T O'Keeffe 0-2, 0-1 free, P O'Neill and E Savage 0-1 each

28 September 2014 Semi-final	Fermoy	3-14 - 2-06	Grenagh	Páirc Uí Rinn
	R O'Hagan 1-3, L Coleman 0-6, D Geary 1-2, P de Róiste 1-1, P Shanahan 0-1, K Morrison 0-1.		T Kenny 0-5, S Burke 1-1, D Dorgan 1-0.

=== Final ===
26 October 2014 Final	Fermoy	2-14 - 1-16	Charleville	Páirc Uí Chaoimh
	L Coleman (0-8, seven frees), D Geary (1-1), R O’Hagan (1-0), M Brennan, P Shanahan, T Clancy, J Hutchings and K Morrisson (0-1 each).	Report	A Cagney (0-9, six frees), A O’Connor (1-0), D Fitzgibbon and J O’Brien (0-2 each), B Dennehy, D Casey and D Murphy (0-1 each).	Referee: J Larkin (Douglas)

== Championship statistics ==
=== Top scorers ===
Overall

Rank	Player	Club	Tally	Total	Matches	Average
1	Peter O'Brien	Kildorrery	1-47	50	5	10.00
2	Tom Kenny	Grenagh	0-43	43	5	8.60
3	Andrew Cagney	Charleville	0-38	38	5	7.60
4	David Geary	Fermoy	6-19	37	7	5.28
5	Liam Coleman	Fermoy	0-34	34	6	5.66
6	Paddy O'Regan	Milford	0-26	26	3	8.66
7	Declan Dalton	Fr. O'Neill's	1-21	24	4	6.00
8	Mark O'Flynn	Aghabullogue	0-23	23	4	5.75
9	Ruairí O'Hagan	Fermoy	6-19	22	7	3.14
10	Diarmuid O'Riordan	Dripsey	0-22	22	3	7.33

In a single game

Rank	Player	Club	Tally	Total	Opposition
1	Peter O'Brien	Kildorrery	0-15	15	Fermoy
2	Peter O'Brien	Kildorrery	1-09	12	Grenagh
3	Andrew O'Brien	Kildorrery	2-05	11	Fr. O'Neill's
3	Declan Dalton	Fr. O'Neill's	1-08	11	Aghada
3	Tom Kenny	Grenagh	0-11	11	Dripsey
3	Peter O'Brien	Kildorrery	0-11	11	Milford
3	Tom Kenny	Grenagh	0-11	11	Kildorrery
8	Dan McCarthy	Ballygarvan	2-03	9	St. Catherine's
8	James O'Brien	Charleville	2-03	9	Aghada
8	Cathal Murphy	Éire Óg	0-09	9	Barryroe
8	Tom Kenny	Grenagh	0-09	9	Kildorrery
8	Andrew Cagney	Charleville	0-09	9	Aghada
8	Andrew Cagney	Charleville	0-09	9	Fermoy
