= 2000 All-Ireland Minor Football Championship =

Gaelic football competition

Championship details

All-Ireland Champions
- Winning team: Cork (10th win)
- Captain: James Masters
- Manager: Teddy Holland

All-Ireland Finalists
- Losing team: Mayo

Provincial Champions
- Munster: Cork
- Leinster: Westmeath
- Ulster: Derry
- Connacht: Mayo

The 2000 All-Ireland Minor Football Championship was the 69th staging of the All-Ireland Minor Football Championship, the Gaelic Athletic Association's premier inter-county Gaelic football tournament for boys under the age of 18.

Down entered the championship as defending champions, however, they were defeated in the Ulster Championship.

On 24 September 2000, Cork won the championship following a 2-12 to 0-13 defeat of Mayo in the All-Ireland final. This was their 10th All-Ireland title overall and their first title in seven championship seasons.

== Results ==
=== Connacht Minor Football Championship ===
Quarter-final

June 2000 Quarter-final	Mayo	1-11 - 1-10	Galway	McHale Park, Castlebar

Semi-final

9 July 2000 Semi-final	Mayo	0-11 - 0-9	Galway	Markievicz Park, Sligo

Final

30 July 2000 Final	Mayo	1-12 - 1-8	Roscommon	Dr Hyde Park, Roscommon

=== Leinster Minor Football Championship ===
Rob robin

2000 Rob robin	Carlow	2-5 - 1-7	Kildare	St Conleth's Park, Newbridge

2000 Rob robin	Louth	1-13 - 1-9	Westmeath	Cusack Park, Mullingar

2000 Rob robin	Meath	0-10 - 1-11	Wexford	St. Patrick's Park, Enniscorthy

2000 Rob robin	Dublin	0-16 - 0-9	Offaly	O'Connor Park, Tullamore

2000 Rob robin	Meath	0-15 - 0-8	Longford	Páirc Tailteann, Navan

2000 Rob robin	Westmeath	10-23 - 0-6	Kilkenny	Nowlan Park, Kilkenny

2000 Rob robin	Laois	1-17 - 0-4	Carlow	Dr Cullen Park, Carlow

2000 Rob robin	Dublin	1-10 - 0-4	Wicklow	Parnell Park, Dublin

Semi-finals

July 2000 Semi-final	Westmeath	0-9 - 0-9	Laois	Croke Park, Dublin

July 2000 Semi-final	Dublin	2-14 - 0-10	Meath	Croke Park, Dublin

July 2000 Semi-final replay	Westmeath	0-14 - 2-4	Laois	Croke Park, Dublin

Final

30 July 2000 Final	Westmeath	2-9 - 1-10	Dublin	Croke Park, Dublin

=== Munster Minor Football Championship ===
Rob robin

2000 Rob robin	Clare	0-11 - 0-3	Waterford	Fraher Field, Dungarvan

2000 Rob robin	Tipperary	2-5 - 0-16	Limerick	Gaelic Grounds, Limerick

2000 Rob robin	Clare	3-11 - 2-5	Limerick	Gaelic Grounds, Limerick

2000 Rob robin	Waterford	5-9 - 1-6	Tipperary	Fraher Field, Dungarvan

2000 Rob robin	Clare	2-7 - 1-13	Tipperary	Gaelic Grounds, Limerick

2000 Rob robin	Limerick	1-8 - 2-10	Waterford	Fraher Field, Dungarvan

Semi-finals

2000 Semi-final	Cork	1-12 - 3-5	Clare	Gaelic Grounds, Limerick

2000 Semi-final	Kerry	0-15 - 2-8	Waterford	Fraher Field, Dungarvan

Final

16 July 2000 Final	Kerry	0-14 - 1-13	Cork	Gaelic Grounds, Limerick

=== Ulster Minor Football Championship ===
Preliminary round

2000 Preliminary round	Monaghan	1-16 - 1-11	Fermanagh	Brewster Park, Enniskillen

Quarter-finals

2000 Quarter-final	Cavan	0-13 - 1-11	Derry	Breffni Park, Cavan

2000 Quarter-final	Antrim	0-8 - 2-10	Down	Casement Park, Belfast

2000 Quarter-final	Donegal	0-10 - 0-14	Monaghan	MacCumhaill Park, Ballybofey

2000 Quarter-final	Armagh	0-4 - 3-10	Tyrone	St Tiernach's Park, Clones

Semi-finals

2000 Semi-final	Derry	1-12 - 0-14	Down	Casement Park, Belfast

2000 Semi-final	Monaghan	0-8 - 0-12	Tyrone	St Tiernach's Park, Clones

Final

16 July 2000 Final	Derry	2-11 - 1-11	Tyrone	St Tiernach's Park, Clones

=== All-Ireland Minor Football Championship ===
Semi-finals

20 August 2000 Semi-final	Cork	0-15 - 0-14	Derry	Croke Park, Dublin
	J Masters 0-6, J Collins 0-2, M O’Connor 0-2, K McMahon 0-1, Kieran Murphy 0-1, N O’Leary 0-1, C Murphy 0-1, B Hegarty 0-1.		C O’Neill 0-6, M Donaghy 0-2, G Donaghy 0-2, J Kelly 0-2, P Young 0-1, B McGuigan 0-1.	Referee: G Kinneavy (Roscommon)

27 August 2000 Semi-final	Westmeath	1-9 - 1-9	Mayo	Croke Park, Dublin
	C Whyte 0-5, T Browne 1-1, A Hickey 0-1, P Leavy 0-1, C Brennan 0-1.		P Prenty 1-2, C Mortimer 0-4, A Burke 0-1, T Geraghty 0-1, C Rowland 0-1.	Referee: M McGrath (Donegal)

9 September 2000 Semi-final replay	Mayo	0-7 - 0-6	Westmeath	Páirc Seán Mac Diarmada, Carrick-on-Shannon
	C Mortimer 0-4, P Prenty 0-1, C Rowland 0-1 A Dillon 0-1.		D McDermott 0-1, T Browne 0-1, A McCormack 0-1, PJ Ward 0-1, N Adamson 0-1, A Hickey 0-1.	Referee: A Mangan (Kerry)

Final

24 September 2000 Final	Cork	2-12 - 0-13	Mayo	Croke Park, Dublin
	C Brosnan 1-2, C Murphy 0-5, M O’Connor 1-1, G McLoughlin 0-2, J Masters 0-1, K McMahon 0-1.		C Mortimer 0-6, E Barrett 0-2 P Prenty 0-2, D Flynn 0-1, A Dillon 0-1, S Drake 0-1.	Referee: M Monaghan (Kildare)
