= 1967 Cork Junior Hurling Championship =

Irish hurling competition

- Dates: 22 October - 26 November 1967
- Teams: 7
- Champions: Kilworth (1st title); John Hogan (captain)
- Runners-up: Cloughduv; Seán O'Mahony (captain)

Tournament statistics
- Matches played: 6
- Goals scored: 30 (5 per match)
- Points scored: 70 (11.67 per match)
- Top scorer(s): Fred Sheedy (2-10)

The 1967 Cork Junior Hurling Championship was the 70th staging of the Cork Junior Hurling Championship since its establishment by the Cork County Board.

The final was played on 26 November 1967 at the Athletic Grounds in Cork, between Kilworth and Cloughduv, in what was their first ever meeting in the final. Kilworth won the match by 3-11 to 2-07 to claim their first ever championship.

Kilworth's Fred Sheedy was the championship's top scorer with 2-10.

== Qualification ==
Division	Championship	Champions
Avondhu	North Cork Junior A Hurling Championship	Kilworth
Carbery	South West Junior A Hurling Championship	Newcestown
Carrigdhoun	South East Junior A Hurling Championship	Valley Rovers
Duhallow	Duhallow Junior A Hurling Championship	Kanturk
Imokilly	East Cork Junior A Hurling Championship	Killeagh
Muskerry	Mid Cork Junior A Hurling Championship	Cloughduv
Seandún	City Junior A Hurling Championship	Mayfield

== Results ==
=== Quarter-finals ===
22 October 1967 Quarter-final	Killeagh	2-05 - 1-07	Mayfield	Páirc Uí Chonaill
	P Lynch 1-1, P Power 1-0, M Moroney 0-2, M McCarthy 0-2.		C Kearney 1-1, T McAuliffe 0-2, V Ring 0-2, T Dunphy 0-1, K Fennelly 0-1.

22 October 1967 Quarter-final	Kilworth	5-03 - 3-07	Newcestown	Cork Athletic Grounds
	F Sheedy 2-1, T O'Halloran 1-0, P Farren 1-0, K Carey 1-0, J Keating 0-1, J Hogan 0-1.		TJ Collins 0-5, J O'Callaghan 1-0, P Crowley 1-0, N Kehilly 1-0, K Kehilly 0-1, A O'Flynn 0-1.

29 October 1967 Quarter-final	Kanturk	2-03 - 1-05	Valley Rovers	Cork Athletic Grounds
	J O'Mahony 1-3, R Quinn 1-0.		D Coleman 1-0, Denis McCarthy 0-2, Dave McCarthy 0-1, J Ryan 0-1, A O'Leary 0-1.

- Cloughduv received a bye in this round.

=== Semi-finals ===
13 November 1967 Semi-final	Kilworth	2-06 - 2-04	Kanturk	Buttevant Grounds
	F Sheedy 0-4, K Casey 1-0, D O'Riordan 1-0, J Hogan 0-2.		S O'Shea 1-1, A Smith 1-0, J O'Mahony 0-1, D O'Sullivan 0-1, S O'Connell 0-1.

13 November 1967 Semi-final	Cloughduv	5-07 - 2-05	Killeagh	Cork Athletic Grounds
	C Kelly 1-3, J Kelly 1-2, M Walsh 1-0, N Cronin 1-0, J Long 1-0, T O'Mahony 0-1, N Dunne 0-1.		P Lynch 1-1, P Barry 1-0, S Treacy 0-2, T Power 0-1, M Moloney 0-1.

=== Final ===
26 November 1967 Final	Kilworth	3-11 - 2-07	Cloughduv	Cork Athletic Grounds
	K Casey 1-2, F Sheedy 0-5, P Mahony 1-0, P Farren 1-0, D Condon 0-2, D Riordan 0-1, J Hogan 0-1.		N Dunne 0-4, T Mahony 1-0, M Walsh 1-0, C Kelly 0-2, J Kelly 0-1.	Referee: F Murphy (Blackrock)

== Championship statistics ==
=== Top scorers ===
Overall

Rank	Player	Club	Tally	Total	Matches	Average
1	Fred Sheedy	Kilworth	2-10	16	3	5.33
2	Pat Lynch	Killeagh	2-02	8	2	4.00
2	Kieran Casey	Kilworth	2-02	8	2	4.00
2	Connie Kelly	Cloughduv	1-05	8	2	4.00
5	Johnny O'Mahony	Kanturk	1-04	7	2	3.50

In a single game

Rank	Player	Club	Tally	Total	Opposition
1	Fred Sheedy	Kilworth	2-01	7	Newcestown
2	Johnny O'Mahony	Kanturk	1-03	6	Valley Rovers
2	Connie Kelly	Cloughduv	1-03	6	Killeagh
4	Jerry Kelly	Cloughduv	1-02	5	Killeagh
4	Kieran Casey	Kilworth	1-02	5	Cloughduv
4	T. J. Collins	Newcestown	0-05	5	Kilworth
4	Fred Sheedy	Kilworth	0-05	5	Cloughduv
