= Fred Sheedy =

Irish hurler and Gaelic footballer (1940–2015)

- Feardorcha Ó Síoda
- Born: 1940; Kilworth, Cork, Ireland
- Died: 18 December 2015 (aged 75); Bishopstown, Cork, Ireland
- Resting place: Kilcrumper New Cemetery
- Occupation: Soldier
- Known for: Gaelic games player, selector and administrator
- Spouse: Peg O'Brien
- Children: 4

Fred Sheedy (1940 – 18 December 2015) was an Irish hurler and Gaelic footballer, Gaelic Athletic Association administrator, coach and selector.

== Playing career ==
Sheedy first played hurling at juvenile and underage levels with the Kilworth club between 1954 and 1958. He soon progressed to adult level and was part of the team that won the club's very first North Cork JHC title in 1961. Sheedy also played Gaelic football and won two consecutive North Cork JFC medals with the Glanworth club.

After winning a second North Cork JHC medal in 1966, Sheedy also claimed a Cork SHC medal that year with divisional side Avondhu. He also lined out at inter-county level with Cork in the Munster IHC around this time. Sheedy won a third North Cork JHC medal in 1967 before being part of Kilworth's first ever Cork JHC-winning team. He captained Kilworth to a fourth North Cork JHC title in 1971. Sheedy retired as a player in 1976.

== Post-playing career ==
After his retirement from playing, Sheedy immediately became involved in team management ad coaching. He was a selector when Kilworth won the North Cork JHC title in 1980. He later spent a number of years as a selector with the Avondhu divisional team. Sheedy was elected club chairman in 1985.

Sheedy took over as coach of the Kilworth junior team in 1991 and guided the team to four North Cork JHC final appearances, with victories coming in 1993 and 1995. He later returned as an Avondhu selector and was part of the management team that helped the division to the Cork SHC title in 1996.

Avondhu's success resulted in Sheedy being nominated for the position of selector with the Cork senior hurling team in 1997. He remained in that position for much of the following decade and served under Jimmy Barry-Murphy, Tom Cashman, Dónal O'Grady and John Allen. During Sheedy's time with Cork, the team won three All-Ireland SHC titles, five Munster SHC titles and a National League title.

== Personal life and death ==
Sheedy joined the Irish Army as a 17-year-old and was attached to the 1st Motor Squadron in Fermoy. He served on a number of overseas peacekeeping missions, including the United Nations Operation in the Congo in 1961.

Sheedy died on 17 December 2015 at the age of 75.

== Honours ==
=== Player ===
Kilworth

- Cork Junior Hurling Championship: 1967
- North Cork Junior Hurling Championship: 1961, 1966 (c), 1967, 1971 (c)

Glanworth

- North Cork Junior Football Championship: 1962, 1963

Avondhu

- Cork Senior Hurling Championship: 1966

=== Management ===
Kilworth

- North Cork Junior Hurling Championship: 1980, 1993, 1995

Avondhu

- Cork Senior Hurling Championship: 1996

Cork

- All-Ireland Senior Hurling Championship: 1999 2004, 2005
- Munster Senior Hurling Championship: 1999 2000, 2003, 2005, 2006
- National Hurling League: 1998
