= Teddy Holland =

Gaelic football player and manager

Personal information
- Native name: Tadhg Ó hAoláin (Irish)
- Born: 1948 (age 77–78) Ballinascarthy, County Cork, Ireland
- Occupation: Retired Garda detective
- Height: 6 ft 0 in (183 cm)

Sport
- Sport: Gaelic football
- Position: Right wing-forward
Clubs
- Years: Club
- Ballinascarthy → Carbery; St Finbarr's
Club titles
- Cork titles: 4
- Munster titles: 2
- All-Ireland Titles: 1
Inter-county
Years	County	Apps (scores)
1969-1970	Cork	3 (1-00)
Inter-county titles
- Munster titles: 0
- All-Irelands: 0
- NFL: 0

Timothy A. Holland (born 1948), known as Teddy Holland, is an Irish Gaelic football coach and former player. At club level he played with Ballinascarthy, Carbery and St Finbarr's and was a member of and later managed the Cork senior football team. Holland usually lined out as a forward.

== Playing career ==
Holland's club career spanned four decades from the 1960s to the early 1990s. Beginning with Ballinascarthy, he earned inclusion on the Carbery divisional team that won County Championship titles in 1968 and 1971. He later transferred to the St Finbarr's club and was at midfield on their 1981 All-Ireland Club Championship-winning team. Holland first appeared in the inter-county scene as a member of the Cork minor football team that won the Munster Minor Championship title in 1966, before later winning a Munster Under-21 Championship title in 1969. He made a number of championship appearances with the Cork senior football team throughout 1969 and 1970, before being recalled to the team a decade later for the 1980-81 National Football League.

== Management career ==
Holland's managerial experience at club level includes stints in charge of Clonakilty and the Carbery divisional team. He spent a number of seasons as a selector with the Cork senior football team and was part of three Munster Championship-winning management teams. His tenure as a selector also saw Cork lose the 1993 All-Ireland final to Derry. After a spell as a selector with the under-21 side, Holland was appointed manager of the Cork minor football team and guided the team to the All-Ireland Minor Championship title in 2000. He was appointed manager of the Cork senior team in November 2007 while the entire team of players were on strike as a protest about the process for picking the selectors. The players refused to play under Holland as he was appointed during the strike. The strike lasted until 18 February 2008 when he resigned as manager as one of the conditions for resolving the strike.

== Honours ==
=== Player ===
Ballinascarthy

- South West Junior A Football Championship: 1978

St Finbarr's

- All-Ireland Senior Club Football Championship: 1981
- Munster Senior Club Football Championship: 1980, 1982
- Cork Senior Football Championship: 1980, 1982

Carbery

- Cork Senior Football Championship: 1968, 1971

Cork

- Munster Under-21 Football Championship: 1969
- Munster Minor Football Championship: 1966

=== Management ===
Cork

- Munster Senior Football Championship: 1993, 1994, 1995
- All-Ireland Minor Football Championship: 2000
- Munster Minor Football Championship: 1999, 2000

Sporting positions
Preceded by	Cork Minor Football Team Manager; 1997-2001	Succeeded by Diarmuid O'Donovan
Preceded by Billy Morgan	Cork Senior Football Team Manager; 2007-2008	Succeeded by Conor Counihan
