= 2012 Cork Junior A Hurling Championship =

- Dates: 9 September – 4 November 2012
- Teams: 7
- Sponsor: Evening Echo
- Champions: Kildorrery (1st title); Richard McEniry (captain); Pat Fenton (manager)
- Runners-up: Brian Dillons; Tom Triggs (captain); Kieran O'Mahony (manager)

Tournament statistics
- Matches played: 7
- Goals scored: 19 (2.71 per match)
- Points scored: 191 (27.29 per match)
- Top scorer(s): John Horgan (2-39)

The 2012 Cork Junior A Hurling Championship was the 115th staging of the Cork Junior A Hurling Championship since its establishment by the Cork County Board in 1895. The championship began on 9 September 2012 and ended on 4 November 2012.

On 4 November 2012, Kildorrery won the championship following a 2–8 to 0–13 defeat of Brian Dillons in a final replay at Páirc Uí Rinn. This was their first championship title in the grade.

Brian Dillons' John Horgan was the championship's top scorer with 2-39.

== Qualification ==
Division	Championship	Champions
Avondhu	North Cork Junior A Hurling Championship	Kildorrery
Carbery	South West Junior A Hurling Championship	Clonakilty
Carrigdhoun	South East Junior A Hurling Championship	Ballinhassig
Duhallow	Duhallow Junior A Hurling Championship	Kilbrin
Imokilly	East Cork Junior A Hurling Championship	Carrignavar
Muskerry	Mid Cork Junior A Hurling Championship	Grenagh
Seandún	City Junior A Hurling Championship	Brian Dillons

== Results ==
=== First round ===
9 September 2012 First round	Carrignavar	1-14 - 1-15	Kildorrery	Ballyhooley
	R Spillane 1-6, P Murphy 0-4, C Burns 0-2, P O'Keeffe 0-2.		P O'Brien 0-8, E O'Connor 1-1, D Kelly 0-4, A O'Brien 0-1, S Kelly 0-1.

29 September 2012 First round	Brian Dillons	1-16 - 2-06	Ballinhassig	Carrigaline
	J Horgan 1-12, T Lawrence 0-2, K McCormack 0-1, J Noonan 0-1.		B Holland 1-4, J Mullaney 1-0, K O'Sullivan 0-1, P Coleman 0-1.

6 October 2012 First round	Kilbrin	3-13 - 1-17	Clonakilty	Cloughduv
	S O'Reilly 2-2, L Daly 1-4, K Sheehan 0-2, E Sheehan 0-2, W Egan 0-1, P Egan 0-1, David O'Sullivan 0-1.		J O'Mahony 0-7, D Fitzpatrick 1-3, J Forristal 0-2, A Murphy 0-2, D O'Regan 0-2, S White 0-1.

=== Semi-finals ===
6 October 2012 Semi-final	Brian Dillons	0-14 - 0-13	Grenagh	Ballincollig
	J Horgan 0-10, B Lawrence 0-2, C McCarthy 0-1, C Brosnan 0-1.		N O'Doherty 0-4, T Kenny 0-3, C O'Neill 0-2, J Russell 0-2, K Cummins 0-1, C Fitzgerald 0-1.

13 October 2012 Semi-final	Kildorrery	3-14 - 2-14	Kilbrin	Páirc Mhic Ghiobúin
	P O'Brien 2-7, F Stapleton 1-0, D Kelly 0-3, G McCarthy 0-1, S Kelly 0-1, M Walsh 0-1, M Lillis 0-1.		L Daly 1-6, C Sheehan 0-5, E Sheehan 1-0, S O'Reilly 0-1, W Egan 0-1, N O'Callaghan 0-1.

=== Final ===
21 October 2012 Final	Kildorrery	2-15 - 1-18	Brian Dillons	Páirc Uí Rinn
	P O'Brien 1-9, F Stapleton 1-1, D Kelly 0-3, E O'Connor 0-1, C Ó Baoill 0-1.		J Horgan 1-10, T Lawrence 0-2 J Noonan 0-2, C Brosnan 0-1, C McCarthy 0-1, P O'Brien 0-1, K Coughlan 0-1.

4 November 2012 Final replay	Kildorrery	2-08 - 0-13	Brian Dillons	Páirc Uí Rinn
	P O'Brien 0-6, F Stapleton 1-0, E O'Connor 1-0, D Kelly 0-1, M Walsh 0-1.		J Horgan 0-7, T Lawrence 0-2, C McCarthy 0-2, M White J Noonan 0-1.

== Championship statistics ==
=== Top scorers ===
Rank	Player	Club	Tally	Total	Matches	Average
1	John Horgan	Brian Dillons	2-39	45	4	11.24
2	Peter O'Brien	Kildorrery	3-30	39	4	9.75
3	Liam Daly	Kilbrin	2-10	16	2	8.00
4	Dave Kelly	Kildorrery	0-11	11	4	2.75
5	Finbarr Stapleton	Kildorrery	3-01	10	4	2.50
6	Stephen O'Reilly	Kilbrin	2-03	9	2	4.50
7	Ronan Spillane	Carrignavar	1-06	9	1	9.00
8	Éamonn O'Connor	Kildorrery	2-02	8	4	2.00
9	Brendan Holland	Ballinhassig	1-04	7	1	7.00
9	Jack O'Mahony	Clonakilty	0-07	7	1	7.00
