= 1998 All-Ireland Minor Football Championship =

Gaelic football competition

Championship details

All-Ireland Champions
- Winning team: Tyrone (4th win)

All-Ireland Finalists
- Losing team: Laois

Provincial Champions
- Munster: Kerry
- Leinster: Laois
- Ulster: Tyrone
- Connacht: Leitrim

The 1998 All-Ireland Minor Football Championship was the 67th staging of the All-Ireland Minor Football Championship, the Gaelic Athletic Association's premier inter-county Gaelic football tournament for boys under the age of 18.

Laois entered the championship as defending champions in search of a third successive All-Ireland title.

On 27 September 1998, Tyrone won the championship following a 2–11 to 0–11 defeat of Laois in the All-Ireland final. This was their fourth All-Ireland title overall and their first in 25 championship seasons.

== Results ==
=== Connacht Minor Football Championship ===
Quarter-finals

May 1998 Quarter-Final	Mayo	1-8 - 0-14	Galway	St Jarlath's Park, Tuam

Semi-finals

June 1998 Semi-Final	Sligo	1-10 - 1-8	Roscommon	Dr Hyde Park, Roscommon

June 1998 Semi-Final	Leitrim	1-10 - 1-9	Galway	St Jarlath's Park, Tuam

Final

19 July 1998 Final	Leitrim	0-8 - 0-7	Sligo	St Jarlath's Park, Tuam

=== Leinster Minor Football Championship ===
Preliminary round

May 1998 Preliminary Round	Carlow	3-9 - 0-3	Kilkenny	Dr Cullen Park, Mullingar

May 1998 Preliminary Round	Wicklow	0-13 - 0-5	Westmeath	Cusack Park, Mullingar

May 1998 Preliminary Round	Dublin	2-7 - 1-10	Meath	Parnell Park, Dublin

May 1998 Preliminary Round Replay	Dublin	1-12 - 1-8	Meath	Páirc Tailteann, Navan

Quarter-finals

June 1998 Quarter-Final	Kildare	1-16 - 2-5	Carlow	Dr Cullen Park, Carlow

June 1998 Quarter-Final	Laois	1-12 - 0-12	Offaly	O'Connor Park, Tullamore

June 1998 Quarter-Final	Wicklow	1-12 - 1-6	Wexford	Aughrim Park, Aughrim

June 1998 Quarter-Final	Dublin	1-11 - 0-6	Louth	Parnell Park, Dublin

Semi-finals

July 1998 Semi-Final	Dublin	0-10 - 0-5	Wicklow	Croke Park, Dublin

July 1998 Semi-Final	Laois	2-11 - 1-10	Kildare	Croke Park, Dublin

Final

2 August 1998 Final	Laois	2-9 - 0-12	Dublin	Croke Park, Dublin

=== Munster Minor Football Championship ===
Rob robin

May 1998 Rob Robin	Limerick	0-17 - 1-8	Tipperary	Gaelic Grounds, Limerick

May 1998 Rob Robin	Waterford	3-4 - 2-7	Clare	Fraher Field, Dungarvan

May 1998 Rob Robin	Waterford	2-9 - 1-12	Tipperary	Fraher Field, Dungarvan

May 1998 Rob Robin	Clare	2-7 - 1-8	Tipperary	Gaelic Grounds, Limerick

June 1998 Rob Robin	Limerick	1-9 - 3-8	Waterford	Fraher Field, Dungarvan

June 1998 Rob Robin	Limerick	0-12 - 1-5	Clare	Gaelic Grounds, Limerick

Semi-finals

June 1998 Semi-Final	Limerick	0-12 - 0-6	Cork	Gaelic Grounds, Limerick

July 1998 Semi-Final	Kerry	1-6 - 1-6	Waterford	Fraher Field, Dungarvan

July 1998 Semi-Final Replay	Kerry	1-10 - 0-9	Waterford	Austin Stack Park, Tralee

Final

2 August 1998 Final	Kerry	2-11 - 0-8	Tipperary	Semple Stadium, Thurles

=== Ulster Minor Football Championship ===
Preliminary round

May 1998 Preliminary Round	Tyrone	2-10 - 1-13	Down	Healy Park, Omagh

May 1998 Preliminary Round Replay	Tyrone	0-12 - 0-6	Down	Pairc Esler, Newry

Quarter-finals

May 1998 Quarter-Final	Antrim	1-8 - 1-7	Donegal	Casement Park, Belfast

May 1998 Quarter-Final	Derry	2-13 - 1-11	Monaghan	Celtic Park, Derry

June 1998 Quarter-Final	Cavan	3-7 - 0-12	Fermanagh	Breffni Park, Cavan

June 1998 Quarter-Final	Tyrone	2-15 - 0-9	Armagh	St Tiernach's Park, Clones

Semi-finals

June 1998 Semi-Final	Antrim	0-12 - 1-4	Cavan	St Tiernach's Park, Clones

June 1998 Semi-Final	Tyrone	0-15 - 0-10	Derry	St Tiernach's Park, Clones

Final

19 July 1998 Final	Tyrone	4-9 - 2-2	Antrim	St Tiernach's Park, Clones

=== All-Ireland Minor Football Championship ===
Semi-finals

23 August 1998 Semi-Final	Tyrone	1-14 - 1-3	Leitrim	Croke Park, Dublin

30 August 1998 Semi-Final	Kerry	2-5 - 1-10	Laois	Croke Park, Dublin

Final

27 September 1998 Final	Tyrone	2-11 - 0-11	Laois	Croke Park, Dublin

== Championship statistics ==
=== Miscellaneous ===
- Leitrim win the Connacht Championship for the first time since 1956.
