= 2007 Cork Junior A Hurling Championship =

- Dates: 7 October – 21 October 2007
- Teams: 7
- Sponsor: Evening Echo
- Champions: Barryroe (1st title); Jason Fleming (captain); Densy Whelton (manager)
- Runners-up: Charleville; P. J. Halloran (captain); Pat Buckley (manager)

Tournament statistics
- Matches played: 7
- Goals scored: 26 (3.71 per match)
- Points scored: 163 (23.29 per match)
- Top scorer(s): John Quinlan (4–24)

The 2007 Cork Junior A Hurling Championship was the 110th staging of the Cork Junior A Hurling Championship since its establishment by the Cork County Board in 1895. The championship ran from 7 October to 21 October 2007.

The final was played on 21 October 2007 at Páirc Uí Chaoimh in Cork, between Barryroe and Charleville, in what was their first ever meeting in the final. Barryroe won the match by 2–19 to 2–13 to claim their first ever championship title.

Charleville's John Quinlan was the championship's top scorer with 4–24.

== Qualification ==
Division	Championship	Representatives
Avondhu	North Cork Junior A Hurling Championship	Charleville
Carbery	South West Junior A Hurling Championship	Barryroe
Carrigdhoun	South East Junior A Hurling Championship	Kinsale
Duhallow	Duhallow Junior A Hurling Championship	Kilbrin
Imokilly	East Cork Junior A Hurling Championship	Erin's Own
Muskerry	Mid Cork Junior A Hurling Championship	Grenagh
Seandún	City Junior A Hurling Championship	Glen Rovers

== Results ==
=== First round ===
22 September 2007 First round	Barryroe	1-15 - 2-06	Erin's Own	Páirc Uí Chaoimh
	K Griffin 0-8, T Harrington 1-0, K McCarthy 0-2, A Fleming 0-1, D Harrington 0-1, G Coleman 0-1, P Collins 0-1, G Whelton 0-1.		A Bowen 1-2, A Lane 1-0, R Aherne 0-2, D O'Flynn 0-1, R Coakley 0-1.

23 September 2007 First round	Kilbrin	3-15 - 4-10	Glen Rovers	Coachford Sportsfield
	D Crowley 2-4, D O'Sullivan 1-4, D Aherne 0-2, N O'Callaghan 0-2, W Egan 0-1, N O'Reilly 0-1, P O'Callaghan 0-1.		J Goggin 2-1, K Hackett 0-4, D Goggin 1-0, M Hackett 1-0, S Hackett 0-2, K Herlihy 0-1, D O'Toole 0-1, L Galvin 0-1.

7 October 2007 First round	Grenagh	0-12 - 0-14	Charleville	Dr. Croke Memorial Park
	D Dorgan 0-4, T Kenny 0-4, R Dorgan 0-2, T Walsh 0-2.		J Quinlan 0-8, P Gammell 0-2, M Gammell 0-2, T O'Callaghan 0-1, B Barrett 0-1.

=== Semi-finals ===
13 October 2007 Semi-final	Charleville	7-24 - 3-10	Kilbrin	Páirc Mhic Ghiobúin
	J Quinlan 3-7, T O'Callaghan 0-6, M Gammell 0-6, M O'Flynn 1-2, B Dennehy 1-1, B Barrett 1-0, D Fitzgerald 1-0, B Foley 0-1, D O'Flynn 0-1.		D Crowley 1-4, P O'Callaghan 1-1, T O'Riordan 1-0, W Egan 0-1, D O'Sullivan 0-1.

14 October 2007 Semi-final	Barryroe	2-15 - 0-10	Kinsale	Páirc Uí Ríogáin
	K Griffin 0-8, P Collins 1-1, J O'Donovan 1-1, K McCarthy 0-2, C Hurley 0-1, D Harrington 0-1, B Coleman 0-1.		B Coughlan 0-4, C O'Brien 0-2, N O'Sullivan 0-2, L Kiely 0-1, K O'Regan 0-1.

=== Final ===
21 October 2007 Final	Barryroe	2-19 - 2-13	Charleville	Páirc Uí Chaoimh
	K Griffin 0-12, P Collins 2-0, K McCarthy 0-3, C Hurley 0-2, D Harrington 0-1, A White 0-1.		J Quinlan 1-9, M Gammell 1-1, T O'Callaghan 0-2, D O'Flynn 0-1.

== Championship statistics ==
=== Top scorers ===
Rank	Player	Club	Tally	Total	Matches	Average
1	John Quinlan	Charleville	4-24	36	3	12.00
2	Kieran Griffin	Barryroe	0-26	28	3	9.33
3	Damien Crowley	Kilbrin	3-08	17	2	8.50
4	Mervyn Gammell	Charleville	1-09	12	3	4.00
5	Pádraig Collins	Barryroe	3-02	11	3	3.66
6	Tadhg O'Callaghan	Charleville	0-09	9	3	3.00
7	Daniel O'Sullivan	Kilbrin	1-05	8	2	4.00
8	John Goggin	Glen Rovers	2-01	7	1	7.00
8	Kevin McCarthy	Barryroe	0-07	7	3	2.33
10	Alan Bowen	Erin's Own	1-02	5	1	5.00

=== Miscellaneous ===
- Glen Rovers were nominated to be the Seandún representatives due to the fact that the City Junior A Hurling Championship was not finished.
