= John O'Mahony (Gaelic footballer) =

Irish Gaelic footballer

Personal information
- Native name: Seán Ó Mathúna (Irish)
- Born: 1937 Kanturk, County Cork, Ireland
- Died: 8 August 2012 (aged 74–75) Kanturk, County Cork, Ireland
- Height: 5 ft 8 in (173 cm)

Sport
- Sport: Gaelic football
- Position: Corner-back
Club
- Years: Club
- Kanturk
Club titles
- Cork titles: 0
Inter-county
Years	County	Apps (scores)
1960-1969	Cork	21 (0-00)
Inter-county titles
- Munster titles: 2
- All-Irelands: 0
- NFL: 0

John O'Mahony (1937 – 8 August 2012) is an Irish former sportsperson. He played Gaelic football with his local club Kanturk and was a member of the Cork senior inter-county team from 1960 until 1969.
