= 2017 Cork Intermediate Hurling Championship =

Irish hurling competition

- Dates: 28 April – 28 October 2017
- Teams: 27
- Sponsor: Evening Echo
- Champions: Aghada (1st title); John Paul O'Connor (captain); Niall McCarthy (manager)
- Runners-up: Éire Óg; Paul Coakley (manager)

Tournament statistics
- Matches played: 54
- Goals scored: 143 (2.65 per match)
- Points scored: 1553 (28.76 per match)
- Top scorer: Kevin Hallissey (1-59)

The 2017 Cork Intermediate Hurling Championship was the 108th staging of the Cork Intermediate Hurling Championship since its establishment by the Cork County Board in 1909. The draw for the opening rounds took place on 11 December 2016. The championship ran from 28 April to 28 October 2017.

The final was played on 28 October 2017 at Páirc Uí Rinn in Cork, between Aghada and Éire Óg, in what was their first ever meeting in the final. Aghada won the match by 0–16 to 0–09 to claim their first ever championship title.

Éire Óg's Kevin Hallissey was the championship's top scorer with 1-59.

== Team changes ==
=== To Championship ===
Promoted from the Cork Junior Hurling Championship

- Mayfield
- Sarsfields

=== From Championship ===
Promoted to the Cork Premier Intermediate Hurling Championship

- Fr. O'Neill's

== Results ==
=== Preliminary round ===
28 April 2017 Preliminary round	Éire Óg	3-15 - 0-12	Kildorrery	Páirc na Bride
	D Goulding 3-0, K Hallissey 0-4, B Hurley 0-3, J Cooper 0-3, J Dineen 0-2, P McDonagh 0-2, R O'Toole 0-1.		M Walsh 0-7, J O'Gorman 0-3, A O'Brien 0-2.

29 April 2017 Preliminary round	Dungourney	1-09 - 0-19	Sarsfields	Páirc Uí Rinn
	R Denny 1-5, S Casey 0-2, Shane Hegarty 0-1, N Motherway 0-1.		L Hackett 0-6, L Healy 0-4, R Duggan 0-4, N McCarthy 0-3, G Grey 0-1, E Collins 0-1.

30 April 2017 Preliminary round	Midleton	2-16 - 2-14	Grenagh	Caherlag Ground
	C Beausang 0-7, P Nagle 1-2, P O'Keeffe 0-4, E Walsh 1-0, D Quirke 0-1, E Mulcahy 0-1, K Mulcahy 0-1.		S Bourke 1-10, P Barry-Murphy 1-0, T Kenny 0-3, P McSweeney 0-1.

=== Round 1 ===
29 April 2017 Round 1	Castlemartyr	0-14 - 2-11	Kilbrittain	Páirc Uí Rinn
	J Stack 0-4, B Ó Tuama 0-3, B Lawton 0-2, L Martin 0-2, M Kelly 0-1, D Kelly 0-1, J Lawton 0-1.		M Sexton 0-6, R Cashman 1-0, C O'Leary 1-0, T Harrington 0-3, D Desmond 0-1, C Hickey 0-1.

12 May 2017 Round 1	Éire Óg	0-21 - 1-10	Meelin	Banteer Sportsfield
	K Hallissey 0-10, P McDonagh 0-3, J Cooper 0-2, K Riordan 0-2, P Kirwan 0-1, B Hurley 0-1, D McCarthy 0-1, J Dineen 0-1.		E Brosnan 0-8, TJ Brosnan 1-0, J O'Callaghan 0-1, W Murphy 0-1.

13 May 2017 Round 1	Aghada	2-15 - 3-09	Ballygarvan	Páirc Uí Chonaill
	C Fleming 1-3, W Leahy 0-5, K O'Hanlin 1-1, J Looney 0-3, P O'Neill 0-1, C Terry 0-1, S O'Keeffe 0-1.		M Kennefick 2-4, D Bouse 1-1, S Buckley 0-2, G White 0-1, D O'Sullivan 0-1.

13 May 2017 Round 1	Ballincollig	3-14 - 1-11	Inniscarra	Coachford Sportsfield
	C Dorgan 0-6, I Coughlan 1-2, S Coughlan 1-1, C O'Donovan 1-1, M O'Leary 0-3, C Kinsella 0-1.		A McCarthy 0-5, S Dornan 1-0, D O'Sullivan 0-1, J O'Brien 0-1, S Linehan 0-1, D O'Connell 0-1, M Nagle 0-1, D Browne 0-1.

14 May 2017 Round 1	Ballymartle	0-13 - 0-18	Sarsfields	Páirc Uí Rinn
	D O'Leary 0-7, S Cummins 0-2, N Crowley 0-2, K O'Callaghan 0-1, L Corry 0-1.		L Hackett 0-11, A Myers 0-2, R O'Driscoll 0-2, N McCarthy 0-1, D English 0-1, R Murphy 0-1.

14 May 2017 Round 1	Argideen Rangers	0-11 - 1-14	Mayfield	Brinny Sportsfield
	F Butler 0-3, B Fleming 0-3, JM O'Callaghan 0-2, C O'Donovan 0-2, D Hurley 0-1.		N Kelly 0-7, S Kelly 1-1, D O'Neill 0-3, R O'Keeffe 0-1, P Duggan 0-1, S Duggan 0-1.

14 May 2017 Round 1	Ballinhassig	1-12 - 3-10	Douglas	Páirc Liam Mhic Cárthaigh
	S Coleman 1-10, G Sheehan 0-1, P Cooney 0-1.		D O'Mahony 1-6, E Dolan 1-0, E O'Brien 1-0, P Barry 0-1, L Dineen 0-1, M O'Callaghan 0-1, D Ward 0-1.

14 May 2017 Round 1	Aghabullogue	1-18 - 0-12	St. Finbarr's	Éire Óg Grounds
	M Bradley 0-14, D Twomey 1-1, N Barry-Murphy 0-2, N Buckley 0-1.		D Scanlon 0-5, B Ramsey 0-3, E Dennehy 0-2, E Hill 0-1, M Ryan 0-1.

14 May 2017 Round 1	Midleton	2-10 - 1-12	Milford	Moore Park
	C Beausang 0-5, P O'Keeffe 0-4, I Kennefick 1-0, P O'Shea 1-0, S O'Farrell 0-1.		H O'Gorman 1-6, E Dillon 0-2, A Watson 0-1, S O'Riordan 0-1, S O'Connell 0-1, P O'Regan 0-1.

14 May 2017 Round 1	Blackrock	3-14 - 1-14	Na Piarsaigh	Páirc Uí Rinn
	D O'Shea 1-9, D Cremin 1-0, G Connolly 1-0, L O'Sullivan 0-3, D Meaney 0-1, I O'Keeffe 0-1.		Evan Sheehan 1-4, G Joyce 0-3, I McDonnell 0-3, Eoin Sheehan 0-2, D Morrissey 0-1, R Lynch 0-1.

14 May 2017 Round 1	Barryroe	1-18 - 1-15	Carrigaline	KIlbrittain Grounds
	T Harrington 0-10, R Fleming 1-0, D O'Sullivan 0-3, M Crowley 0-2, C Hurley 0-1, T Kearney 0-1, B O'Donovan 0-1.		M O'Sullivan 0-6, B Coakley 0-4, S Maguire 1-0, K Kavanagh 0-2, M Lynch 0-1, J McCarthy 0-1, C Vaughan 0-1.

20 May 2017 Round 1	Dripsey	0-12 - 2-19	Glen Rovers	Éire Óg Grounds
	M O'Riordan 0-5, E Maher 0-2, C Hayes 0-2, D O'Riordan 0-2, David O'Sullivan 0-1.		E O'Connell 0-10, D Braham 2-1, A Evans 0-2, G Kennefick 0-2, D Brown 0-2, C O'Brien 0-1, P Virgo 0-1.

=== Round 2A ===
3 June 2017 Round 2A	Blackrock	0-14 - 0-12	Éire Óg	Páirc Liam Mhic Cárthaigh
	L Fogarty 0-3, L O'Sullivan 0-2, C O'Leary 0-2, G Connolly 0-2, B Ahern 0-2, M O'Farrell 0-1, I O'Keeffe 0-1, E O'Sullivan 0-1.		K Hallissey 0-6, J Dineen 0-2, D O'Connor 0-2, P McDonagh 0-1, E O'Shea 0-1.

4 June 2017 Round 2A	Barryroe	1-09 - 2-16	Kilbrittain	Ahamilla Complex
	T Harrington 0-7, C Hurley 1-0, P Moloney 0-1, M Crowley 0-1.		D Harrington 1-4, P O'Mahony 1-2, M Sexton 0-5, P Wall 0-3, C Harrington 0-1, T Sheehan 0-1.

16 June 2017 Round 2A	Glen Rovers	2-21 - 2-21 (aet)	Midleton	Caherlag Grounds
	E O'Connell 1-8, D Braham 1-5, E O'Neill 0-4, E Cronin 0-1, L Coughlan 0-1, P Virgo 0-1, D Goggin 0-1.		C Beausang 0-10, S O'Farrell 1-3, M Abernethy 1-0, I Kennefick 0-3, P Dowling 0-3, S O'Leary-Hayes 0-2.

24 June 2017 Round 2A	Aghada	3-14 - 2-19	Sarsfields	Páirc Uí Chonaill
	J Looney 2-3, W Leahy 1-4, K O'Hanlon 0-3, C Fleming 0-1, A Stafford 0-1, C Terry 0-1, G Melvin 0-1.		J McSweeney 1-6, G O'Loughlin 0-9, P Barry 1-0, R Murphy 0-2, R Ryan 0-1, L Healy 0-1.

24 June 2017 Round 2A	Ballincollig	0-16 - 0-11	Douglas	Church Road
	C Dorgan 0-6, S Walsh 0-3, R Bourke 0-3, E Hegarty 0-1, C Kinsella 0-1, C O'Sullivan 0-1, S Coughlan 0-1.		D O'Mahony 0-6, F Desmond 0-2, J Moylan 0-1, E Dolan 0-1, J Collins 0-1.

30 June 2017 Round 2A replay	Glen Rovers	1-10 - 2-15	Midleton	Caherlag Grounds
	E O'Connell 0-8, P Virgo 1-0, E O'Neill 0-2.		M Abernethy 1-3, S O'Meara 0-6, E Walsh 1-2, S Finn 0-2, E Mulcahy 0-2.

1 July 2017 Round 2A	Aghabullogue	1-14 - 2-15	Mayfield	Blarney Grounds
	M Bradley 0-9, D Merrick 1-0, D Twomey 0-2, J Buckley 0-1, N Barry-Murphy 0-1, P Twomey 0-1.		S Kelly 2-1, N Kelly 0-6, K Punch 0-2, P Duggan 0-2, S Duggan 0-2, K Walsh 0-1.

=== Round 2B ===
4 June 2017 Round 2B	Ballinhassig	4-22 - 1-14	Carrigaline	Ballymartle Grounds
	C Desmond 1-10, E Bickley 1-7, P Coomey 2-0, P O'Sullivan 0-5.		B Coakley 0-10, J McCarthy 0-4, M Lynch 1-0.

11 June 2017 Round 2B	Dungourney	0-15 - 0-10	Inniscarra	Caherlag Grounds
	M Hennessy 0-6, S Hegarty 0-5, S McCarthy 0-3, B Forbes 0-1.		P Farmer 0-8, T Murphy 0-1, P O'Donoghue 0-1.

17 June 2017 Round 2B	Ballymartle	2-16 - 3-15	Milford	Mallow GAA Complex
	D O'Leary 0-10, P O'Dwyer 1-1, K O'Callaghan 1-0, S Cummins 0-3, L Corry 0-1, L Allen 0-1.		H O'Gorman 0-8, A Watson 2-0, B Villiers 1-0, S O'Connell 0-3, P Kirwan 0-2, P O'Regan 0-1, E Dillon 0-1.

19 June 2017 Round 2B	Kildorrery	2-13 - 0-17	St. Finbarr's	Páirc na Bride
	P O'Brien 0-7, F Stapleton 1-2, S Coughlan 1-0, J McCarthy 0-2, J o'Sullivan 0-1, A O'Brien 0-1.		I Lordan 0-9, B O'Connell 0-3, E Hill 0-1, R O'Mahony 0-1, M Ryan 0-1, E Dennehy 0-1, C O'Mahony 0-1.

23 June 2017 Round 2B	Ballygarvan	2-14 - 1-17 (aet)	Na Piarsaigh	Éire Óg Grounds
	M Kennefick 1-9, G White 1-2, T O'Halloran 0-1, C Mackey 0-1, D McCarthy 0-1.		E Sheehan 1-13, C Murphy 0-1, D Morrissey 0-1, E Dorgan 0-1, R Lynch 0-1.

24 June 2017 Round 2B	Argideen Rangers	0-16 - 0-12	Dripsey	Cloughduv Grounds
	JM O'Callaghan 0-7, B Fleming 0-5, F Butler 0-2, J Deasy 0-1, E Lawton 0-1.		M O'Sullivan 0-3, J Carey 0-2, D O'Sullivan 0-2, P O'Riordan 0-1, M O'Riordan 0-1, D O'Riordan 0-1, E Maher 0-1, G Murphy 0-1.

24 June 2017 Round 2B	Castlemartyr	4-16 - 1-17	Grenagh	Mayfield Grounds
	Brian Lawton 0-11, C Haines 2-0, J Stack 1-1, L Martin 1-0, M Kelly 0-2, C Bowens 0-1, S Hennessy 0-1.		S Bourke 1-8, T Kenny 0-5, N Doherty 0-1, C Kenny 0-1, L Walsh 0-1, J Russell 0-1.

=== Relegation playoffs ===
16 September 2017 Round 1	Ballygarvan	2-12 - 1-15	Dripsey	Páirc Uí Chonchúir
	M Kennefick 1-10, D O'Connor 1-1, G White 0-1.		M O'Riordan 0-6, M O'Sullivan 1-2, E Maher 0-3, G Murphy 0-1, S Burke 0-1, D O'Riordan 0-1, D O'Sullivan 0-1.

24 September 2017 Round 1	Inniscarra	1-10 - 1-24	St. Finbarr's	Mourneabbey Grounds
	P Farmer 1-4, S Linehan 0-2, M O'Connell 0-2, J Buckley 0-1, J O'Dwyer 0-1.		M Ryan 0-10, E Hill 0-6, M Geary 1-1, D Scanlan 0-2, B O'Connell 0-2, S Goggin 0-2, C Barrett 0-1.

1 October 2017 Round 1	Ballymartle	1-06 - 2-20	Grenagh	Páirc Liam Mhic Cárthaigh
	B Dwyer 1-1, K O'Callaghan 0-3, D O'Mahony 0-2.		S Bourke 1-7, S Cronin 0-5, P Barry-Murphy 1-0, A O'Neill 0-3, C O'Sullivan 0-2, N Doherty 0-2, T Kenny 0-1.

8 October 2017 Round 1 replay	Ballygarvan	1-11 - 4-11	Dripsey	Páirc Uí Chonchúir
	M Kennefick 0-5, G White 1-1, D McCarthy 0-2, D O'Sullivan 0-2, P Sexton 0-1.		Mark O'Sullivan 3-1, M O'Riordan 0-6, E Maher 1-1, J Carey 0-2, David O'Sullivan 0-1.

15 October 2017 Round 2	Ballymartle	1-07 - 1-19	Inniscarra	Brinny Sportsfield
	J Dwyer 1-5, J O'Regan 0-1, J Ryan 01-.		M O'Connell 1-4, D O'Keeffe 0-7, P Farmer 0-5, S Linehan 0-2, C Lombard 0-1.

15 October 2017 Round 2	Meelin	w/o - scr.	Carrigaline

=== Round 3 ===
15 July 2017 Round 3	Castlemartyr	1-14 - 3-16	Éire Óg	Páirc Uí Rinn
	Brian Lawton 0-7, C Haines 1-1, D Kelly 0-3, M Kelly 0-3.		K Hallissey 1-6, D Goulding 1-1, K O'Riordan 1-1, E O'Shea 0-4, D O'Connor 0-1, R O'Toole 0-1, J Cooper 0-1, C O'Callaghan 0-1.

15 July 2017 Round 3	Aghada	3-15 - 0-15	Ballinhassig	Páirc Uí Rinn
	C Fleming 3-6, K O'Hanlon 0-4, W Leahy 0-3, A Stafford 0-2.		G Collins 0-9, P Coleman 0-2, D Duggan 0-2, M Walsh 0-1, D Brennan 0-1.

16 July 2017 Round 3	Kildorrery	1-13 - 0-10	Milford	Fr Con Buckley Park
	P O'Brien 0-7, S Coughlan 1-0, J Keating 0-2, A O'Brien 0-2, J McCarthy 0-1, F Stapleton 0-1.		H O'Gorman 0-6, D Hannigan 0-1, T O'Flynn 0-1, A Watson 0-1, J Hartnett 0-1.

18 July 2017 Round 3 replay	Na Piarsaigh	0-16 - 0-14	Ballygarvan	Éire Óg Grounds
	E Sheehan 0-8, R Lynch 0-2, P O'Rourke 0-2, K Waters 0-2, C O'Mahony 0-1, R O'Meara 0-1.		M Kennefick 0-9, D McCarthy 0-3, T O'Halloran 0-1, G White 0-1.

21 July 2017 Round 3	Argideen Rangers	0-15 - 3-11	Glen Rovers	Brinny Sportsfield
	JM O'Callaghan 0-6, B Fleming 0-2, E Lawton 0-2, B Hennessy 0-2, J Murphy 0-1, P Butler 0-1, F Butler 0-1.		E O'Connell 0-7, C O'Brien 2-0, A Evans 1-1, D Goggin 0-1, P Virgo 0-1, K McCarthy 0-1.

28 July 2017 Round 3	Aghabullogue	2-15 - 2-16	Na Piarsaigh	Páirc Uí Chonchúir
	J Corkery 1-6, M Bradley 0-5, D Merrick 1-1, J Buckley 0-1, G Murphy 0-1, N Barry-Murphy 0-1.		E Sheehan 1-8, E McCarthy 1-4, K Waters 0-1, P O'Rourke 0-1, C Murphy 0-1, C O'Mahony 0-1.

30 July 2017 Round 3	Douglas	1-24 - 2-09	Dungourney	Páirc Uí Rinn
	R Howell 1-2, E Dolan 0-5, J Moylan 0-4, D Ward 0-3, M O'Callaghan 0-3, F Desmond 0-3, J Collins 0-1, E Cadogan 0-1, L Dineen 0-1, B Powter 0-1.		S Hegarty 1-5, S Casey 1-1, M Hennessy 0-3.

5 August 2017 Round 3	Barryroe	2-18 - 4-11	Meelin	Cloughduv Grounds
	T Harrington 0-11, D O'Sullivan 1-0, G O'Leary 1-0, J O'Donovan 0-2, C Hurley 0-2, J Murphy 0-2, S Holland 0-1.		James Forrest 2-2, W Murphy 1-1, S Brosnan 1-1, TJ Brosnan 0-3, S O'Sullivan 0-1, John Forrest 0-1, S O'Riordan 0-1, J O'Callaghan 0-1.

=== Round 4 ===
19 August 2017 Round 4	Aghada	3-21 - 3-18	Kildorrery	Páirc na Bríde
	J Looney 2-4, C Fleming 1-6, W Leahy 0-7, S O'Keeffe 0-2, R Kennedy 0-1, P O'Neill 0-1.		P O'Brien 0-7, A O'Brien 1-3, E O'Connor 1-2, S Coughlan 1-1, S O'Neill 0-1, J Keating 0-1, S Fitzgerald 0-1, W Fouhy 0-1, S Kelly 0-1.

19 August 2017 Round 4	Barryroe	0-14 - 1-30	Sarsfields	Brinny Sportsfield
	T Harrington 0-7, J O'Donovan 0-3, S Holland 0-1, C Madden 0-1, D O'Sullivan 0-1, T Kearney 0-1.		G O'Loughlin 0-10, P Barry 1-4, J Sweeney 0-4, L Healy 0-4, E Collins 0-3, J O'Leary 0-2, J Flannery 0-1, R Duggan 0-1, T Crowley 0-1.

20 August 2017 Round 4	Blackrock	1-14 - 1-15	Douglas	Páirc Uí Rinn
	T Deasy 1-4, L Fogarty 0-3, D Cremin 0-3, R Cantwell 0-1, M O'Farrell 0-1, C O'Leary 0-1, L O'Sullivan 0-1.		D O'Mahony 0-12, M O'Callaghan 1-0, E O'Brien 0-1, J Moylan 0-1, E Dolan 0-1.

8 September 2017 Round 4	Éire Óg	2-15 - 1-10	Glen Rovers	Páirc Uí Rinn
	K Hallissey 0-8, E O'Shea 1-3, D Goulding 1-0, R O'Toole 0-1, J Cooper 0-1, J Dineen 0-1, B Hurley 0-1.		P Virgo 0-9. A Evans 1-1.

15 September 2017 Round 4	Midleton	3-20 - 2-09	Na Piarsaigh	Páirc Shéamuis de Barra
	S O'Meara 1-4, P Dowling 1-3, M Abernethy 0-6, C Hurley 0-4, E Walsh 1-0, J Kennefick 0-1, S O'Farrell 0-1, D Quirke 0-1.		E McCarthy 0-4, D McGuire 1-0, E Nodwell 1-0, C Bowen 0-1, A Keating 0-1, R O'Meara 0-1, S Curtin 0-1, K Waters 0-1.

=== Quarter-finals ===
19 August 2017 Quarter-final	Ballincollig	1-20 - 2-08	Kilbrittain	Charlie Hurley Park
	C Dorgan 0-10, S Walsh 0-4, I Coughlan 1-0, R Bourke 0-2, E Hegarty 0-2, L Jennings 0-1, D Bowen 0-1.		M Sexton 0-5, P Wall 1-0, D Harrington 0-1, T Harrington 0-1, T Sheehan 0-1.

2 September 2017 Quarter-final	Mayfield	1-15 - 1-08	Douglas	Páirc Uí Rinn
	D O'Neill 0-11, S Kelly 1-2, K Punch 0-1, N Kelly 0-1.		F Desmond 1-0, J Moylan 0-3, D O'Mahony 0-2, E O'Brien 0-2, L Dineen 0-1.

23 September 2017 Quarter-final	Aghada	2-12 - 2-09	Midleton	Páirc Shéamuis de Barra
	C Fleming 2-7, J Looney 0-2, W Leahy 0-2, S O'Keeffe 0-1.		M Abernethy 1-2, P Dowling 1-0, S O'Meara 0-3, P O'Keeffe 0-2, K Mulcahy 0-1, G Manley 0-1.

23 September 2017 Quarter-final	Éire Óg	0-17 - 0-07	Sarsfields	Blarney Grounds
	K Hallissey 0-10, E O'Shea 0-2, K Riordan 0-2, J Cooper 0-1, B Hurley 0-1, C O'Callaghan 0-1.		G O'Loughlin 0-4, R Murphy 0-1, J Sweeney 0-1, L Hackett 0-1.

=== Semi-finals ===
7 October 2017 Semi-final	Aghada	1-23 - 0-11	Mayfield	Páirc Uí Rinn
	J Looney 0-10, W Leahy 1-5, C Fleming 0-3, R Kennedy 0-1, J McDonald 0-1, K O'Hanlon 0-1, D Creedon 0-1, C Terry 0-1.		N Kelly 0-7, D Hayes 0-1, G Looney 0-1, R O'Keeffe 0-1, K Punch 0-1.

7 October 2017 Semi-final	Éire Óg	1-17 - 1-15	Ballincollig	Páirc Uí Chinnéide
	K Hallissey 0-9, D Goulding 1-0, E O'Shea 0-3, C O'Callaghan 0-2, P McDonagh 0-2, J Cooper 0-1.		D Bowen 1-4, C Dorgan 0-6, E Hegarty 0-2, I Coughlan 0-1, L Fahy 0-1, S Coughlan 0-1.

=== Final ===
28 October 2017 Final	Aghada	0-16 - 0-09	Éire Óg	Páirc Uí Rinn
	C Fleming 0-6 (4 frees), J Looney 0-3, W Leahy 0-2, P O’Neill, R Kennedy, B Hennessey, A Stafford and K O’Hanlon 0-1 each.	Report	K Hallissey 0-6 (3 frees), J Cooper, C O’Callaghan and B Hurley 0-1 each.	Referee: M Maher (St. Finbarr's)

== Championship statistics ==
=== Top scorers ===
Overall

Rank	Player	Club	Tally	Total	Matches	Average
1	Kevin Hallissey	Éire Óg	1-59	62	8	7.75
2	Cian Fleming	Aghada	7-32	53	7	7.57
3	Mark Kennefick	Ballygarvan	4-37	49	5	9.80
4	Evan Sheehan	Na Piarsaigh	3-33	42	3	10.50
5	John Looney	Aghada	4-25	37	7	5.28
6	Evan O'Connell	Glen Rovers	1-33	36	4	9.00
7	Tadhg Harrington	Barryroe	0-35	35	4	8.75
8	Seán Bourke	Grenagh	3-25	34	3	11.33
8	William Leahy	Aghada	2-28	34	7	4.85
10	Diarmuid O'Mahony	Douglas	1-26	29	4	7.25

In a single game

Rank	Player	Club	Tally	Total	Opposition
1	Evan Sheehan	Na Piarsaigh	1-13	16	Ballygarvan
2	Cian Fleming	Aghada	2-10	16	Ballinhassig
3	Matthew Bradley	Aghabullogue	0-14	14	St. Finbarr's
4	Cian Fleming	Aghada	2-07	13	Midleton
4	Seán Coleman	Ballinhassig	1-10	13	Douglas
4	Seán Bourke	Grenagh	1-10	13	Midleton
4	Conor Desmond	Ballinhassig	1-10	13	Carrigaline
4	Mark Kennefick	Ballygarvan	1-10	13	Dripsey
9	David O'Shea	Blackrock	1-09	12	Na Piarsaigh
9	Mark Kennefick	Ballygarvan	1-09	12	Na Piarsaigh
9	Diarmuid O'Mahony	Douglas	0-12	12	Blackrock
