= 2007 Cork Intermediate Football Championship =

Gaelic football competition

- Sponsor: Evening Echo
- Champions: Grenagh (1st title)
- Runners-up: Carrigaline

The 2007 Cork Intermediate Football Championship was the 72nd staging of the Cork Intermediate Football Championship since its establishment by the Cork County Board in 1909.

The final was played on 27 October 20007 at Páirc Uí Rinn in Cork, between Grenagh and Carrigaline, in what was their first ever meeting in the final. Grenagh won the match by 2–13 to 0–13 to claim their first ever championship title.

== Results ==
=== Final ===
29 October 2007 Final	Grenagh	2-13 - 0-13	Carrigaline	Páirc Uí Rinn
