= 2006 Cork Junior A Hurling Championship =

- Dates: 24 September – 28 October 2006
- Teams: 7
- Sponsor: Evening Echo
- Champions: Kilworth (2nd title); Kieran Walsh (captain); Pat Greehy (manager)
- Runners-up: Dungourney; William Daly (captain)

Tournament statistics
- Matches played: 7
- Goals scored: 14 (2 per match)
- Points scored: 157 (22.43 per match)
- Top scorer(s): John Horgan (1–15)

The 2006 Cork Junior A Hurling Championship was the 109th staging of the Cork Junior A Hurling Championship since its establishment by the Cork County Board in 1895. The championship ran from 24 September to 28 October 2006.

The final was played on 28 October 2006 at Páirc Uí Rinn in Cork, between Kilworth and Dungourney, in what was their first ever meeting in the final. Kilworth won the match by 0–13 to 0–12 to claim their second championship title overall and a first title in 39 years.

Brian Dillons's John Horgan was the championship's top scorer with 1–15.

== Qualification ==
Division	Championship	Champions
Avondhu	North Cork Junior A Hurling Championship	Kilworth
Carbery	South West Junior A Hurling Championship	Barryroe
Carrigdhoun	South East Junior A Hurling Championship	Ballinhassig
Duhallow	Duhallow Junior A Hurling Championship	Banteer
Imokilly	East Cork Junior A Hurling Championship	Dungourney
Muskerry	Mid Cork Junior A Hurling Championship	Cloughduv
Seandún	City Junior A Hurling Championship	Brian Dillons

== Results ==
=== Bracket ===
Quarter-Finals
Kilworth (Avondhu)	2-15
Banteer (Duhallow)	1-06
Barryroe (Carbery)	1-14, 3-08
Brian Dillons (Seandun)	1-14, 1-12
Dungourney (Imokilly)	2-10
Ballinhassig (Carrigdhoun)	0-11

Semi-Finals
Cloughduv (Muskerry)	0-10
Kilworth (Avondhu)	3-14
Barryroe (Carbery)	0-08
Dungourney (Imokilly)	0-10

Final
Kilworth (Avondhu)	0-13
Dungourney (Imokilly)	0-12

=== First round ===
24 September 2006 First round	Barryroe	1-14 - 1-14	Brian Dillons	Charlie Hurley Park
	P Collins 1-3, D Harrington 0-3, K Griffin 0-3, A Fleming 0-3, K McCarthy 0-1, C Hurley 0-1.		John Horgan 0-7, James Horgan 1-2, M Carey 0-2, D Whelan 0-1, S Crighton 0-1, M Buckley 0-1.

30 September 2006 First round replay	Barryroe	3-08 - 1-12	Brian Dillons	Charlie Hurley Park
	D Harrington 3-0, K Griffin 0-6, P Collins 0-1, A White 0-1.		John Horgan 1-8, M Coholan 0-1, A Costello 0-1, James Horgan 0-1, K O'Mahony 0-1.

14 October 2006 First round	Kilworth	2-15 - 1-06	Banteer	Páirc Uí Rinn
	A Mannix 1-3, D O'Donoghue 1-2, D McNamara 0-3, P Lynch 0-3, E Pierce 0-1, D Cahill 0-1, B Tobin 0-1, N O'Brien 0-1.		D Murphy 1-1, C Roche 0-3, J Lane 0-1, D Roche 0-1.

17 October 2006 First round	Dungourney	2-10 - 0-11	Ballinhassig	Páirc Uí Rinn
	Kevin Kelleher 1-2, S Casey 0-4, D Leahy 1-0, Kenneth Kelleher 0-2, M Wall 0-1, L Ahern 0-1.		K O'Sullivan 0-9, D Casey 0-1, T Finn 0-1.

=== Semi-finals ===
6 October 2006 First round	Kilworth	3-14 - 0-10	Cloughduv	Páirc Uí Rinn
	P Lynch 1-7, B Tobin 1-1, D O'Donoghue 1-0, A Mannix 0-2, D Cahill 0-1, T Twomey 0-1, D McNamara 0-1, M O'Connor 0-1.		D Corkery 0-3, G Shanahan 0-2, D McCarthy 0-1, J O'Riordan 0-1, K Walsh 0-1, B Aherne 0-1, T O'Mahony 0-1.

21 October 2006 Semi-final	Dungourney	0-10 - 0-08	Barryroe	Páirc Uí Rinn
	J Hickey 0-4, S Casey 0-4, D Leahy 0-1, Kevin Kelleher 0-1.		K Griffin 0-5, K McCarthy 0-1, P Fleming 0-1, D Harrington 0-1.

=== Final ===
28 October 2006 Final	Kilworth	0-13 - 0-12	Dungourney	Páirc Uí Rinn
	A Mannix 0-4, P Lynch 0-4, E Pierce 0-3, T Twomey 0-1, B Tobin 0-1.		S Casey 0-7, P Kelleher 0-2, L Ahern 0-1, Kenneth Kelleher 0-1, D Leahy 0-1.

== Championship statistics ==
=== Top scorers ===
Rank	Player	Club	Tally	Total	Matches	Average
1	John Horgan	Brian Dillons	1-15	18	2	9.00
2	Paudie Lynch	Kilworth	1-14	17	3	5.66
3	Shane Casey	Dungourney	0-15	15	3	5.00
4	Kieran Griffin	Barryroe	0-14	14	3	4.66
5	Denis Harrington	Barryroe	3-04	13	3	4.33
6	Adrian Mannix	Kilworth	1-09	12	3	4.00
7	Kevin O'Sullivan	Ballinhassig	0-09	9	1	9.00
8	Damian O'Donoghue	Kilworth	2-02	8	3	2.66
9	Pádraig Collins	Barryroe	1-04	7	2	3.50
10	James Horgan	Brian Dillons	1-03	6	2	3.00
10	Brian Tobin	Kilworth	1-03	6	3	2.00
10	Kevin Kelleher	Dungourney	1-03	6	3	2.00
