= 2019 Cork Intermediate Hurling Championship =

Irish hurling competition

- Dates: 27 April 2019 – 16 November 2019
- Teams: 26
- Sponsor: The Echo
- Champions: Blackrock (1st title); Eoin O'Farrell (captain); Olan Murray (manager)
- Runners-up: Cloughduv; Mark Verling (captain); Tim Barry-Murphy (manager); Tomás Twomey (manager)

Tournament statistics
- Matches played: 45
- Goals scored: 112 (2.48 per game)
- Points scored: 1353 (30.06)
- Top scorer(s): Brian Verling (1-43)

The 2019 Cork Intermediate Hurling Championship was the 110th staging of the Cork Intermediate Hurling Championship since its establishment by the Cork County Board in 1909. The draw for the opening round fixtures took place on 15 January 2019. The championship began on 27 April 2019 and ended on 16 November 2019.

On 16 November 2019, Blackrock won the championship after a 0-15 to 1-10 defeat of Cloughduv in the final at Páirc Uí Rinn. This was their first ever championship title.

Cloughduv's Brian Verling was the championship's top scorer with 1-43.

== Team changes ==
=== To Championship ===
Promoted from the Cork Junior Hurling Championship

- Cloughduv

=== From Championship ===
Regraded to the Mid Cork Junior A Hurling Championship

- Inniscarra

Promoted to the Cork Premier Intermediate Hurling Championship

- Ballincollig

== Results ==
=== Round 1 ===
27 April 2019 Round 1	Argideen Rangers	2-15 - 0-17	Castlemartyr	Páirc Uí Rinn, Cork
	M O'Callaghan 1-4, JM O'Callaghan 0-7, D O'Donovan 1-0, M Lawton 0-2, P Butler 0-1, F Butler 0-1.		D Moran 0-4, B Lawton 0-3, M Kelly 0-2, B Smiddy 0-2, J McGann 0-2, J Lawton 0-1, E Martin 0-1, B Ó Túama 0-1, J Stack 0-1.	Referee: A Larkin (Shamrocks)

27 April 2019 Round 1	Blackrock	2-14 - 1-10	Kilbrittain	Brinny Sportsfield, Brinny
	A Connolly 0-5, G Regan 1-1, O Kelleher 1-0, E O'Farrell 0-3, R Cantwell 0-1, I O'Keeffe 0-1, M O'Keeffe 0-1, L Fogarty 0-1, B Cain 0-1.		M Sexton 0-6, D Harrington 1-0, A Holland 0-2, T Sheehan 0-1, P Wall 0-1.	Referee: N O'Neill (Midleton)

27 April 2019 Round 1	Éire Óg	1-22 - 2-18	Dungourney	Páirc Uí Rinn, Cork
	K Hallissey 0-6, K O'Riordan 1-2, E O'Shea 0-5, D Desmond 0-4, D Kirwan 0-3, B Hurley 0-1, J Cooper 0-1.		R Denny 0-12, Seán Hegarty 1-1, Cormac Griffin 1-1, E Ahern 0-1, Shane Hegarty 0-1, D Healy 0-1, J McCarthy 0-1.	Referee: L O'Riordan (Belgooly)

27 April 2019 Round 1	Barryroe	0-07 - 3-16	Glen Rovers	Brinny Sportsfield, Brinny
	J Murphy 0-4, M Whelton 0-1, D Kiely 0-1, D O'Driscoll 0-1.		E O'Connell 0-11, C O'Brien 2-0, R McGuckian 1-0, P Virgo 0-3, A Evans 0-2.	Referee: F Ó Murchú (Valley Rovers)

3 May 2019 Round 1	St. Catherine's	0-15 - 0-17	Cloughduv	Páirc Uí Rinn, Cork
	Shane O’Brien (0-9, 0-6 frees, 0-3 65s), D Mangan and B Mulcahy (0-2 each), K Neville and B O’Brien (0-1 each).	Report	B Verling (0-10, 0-7 frees), D Corkery (0-2), D O’Sullivan, M Walsh, A Murphy, M Verling and J Ryan (0-1 each).	Referee: C O'Regan (Ballyhea)

4 May 2019 Round 1	Tracton	0-25 - 1-16	Kildorrery	Blarney
	R Walsh 0-13, D Harrington 0-6, M O'Sullivan 0-3, C McGuinness 0-2, D O'Flaherty 0-1.		P O'Brien 0-6, J Keating 1-2, F Stapleton 0-3, S O'Neill 0-2, D Kent 0-1, J McEniry 0-1, J O'Sullivan 0-1.	Referee: I McCarthy (Bandon)

4 May 2019 Round 1	Aghabullogue	0-14 - 1-10	Ballinhassig	Ovens
	S Tarrant 0-9, P Ring 0-3, P Twomey 0-1, I Barry-Murphy 0-1.		G Sheehan 1-2, D O'Donovan 0-5, D Brennan 0-3.	Referee: P Lyons (Bishopstown)

4 May 2019 Round 1	Grenagh	1-19 - 0-19	Na Piarsaigh	Blarney
	S Bourke 0-11, C Buckley 1-2, A O'Neill 0-2, P Barry-Murphy 0-1, T Kenny 0-1, M O'Riordan 0-1, C O'Sullivan 0-1.		K Moynihan 0-10, P Gould 0-3, E Hannifin 0-2, C Murphy 0-2, E Galvin 0-1, C Waters 0-1.	Referee: N O'Neill (Midleton)

4 May 2019 Round 1	Dripsey	1-08 - 0-24	Ballygarvan	Ovens
	M O'Riordan 0-5, E Maher 1-1, M O'Sullivan 0-1, A Murray 0-1.		M Kennefick 0-11, C O'Leary 0-2, Donald O'Sullivan 0-2, R O'Halloran 0-2, D O'Connor 0-2, M Cussen 0-2, T O'Halloran 0-1, D McCarthy 0-1, P O'Halloran 0-1.	Referee: C Egan (Glen Rovers)

5 May 2019 Round 1	Meelin	2-18 - 2-15	Midleton	Coachford
	E Brosnan 1-10, J O'Callaghan 0-5, John Forrest 1-0, S Hehir 0-1, Jeremy Curtin 0-1, James Forrest 0-1.		A Mulcahy 0-8, P White 2-0, P Haughney 0-2, S O'Farrell 0-1, S Finn 0-1, K Farmer 0-1, P O'Brien 0-1, P Dowling 0-1.	Referee: B Barry-Murphy (Aghabullogue)

5 May 2019 Round 1	Milford	3-13 - 3-22	Ballymartle	Coachford
	H O’Gorman (0-7, 0-4 frees), M Sheehy and A Watson (1-1 each), B Murphy (1-0), E Dillon (0-2), P O’Regan and M O’Flynn (0-1 each).	Report	B Dwyer (0-9, 0-3 frees, 0-2 65s), A Daly (1-3), K McCarthy and P Dwyer (1-2 each), J Dwyer (0-5), G Webb (0-1 free).	Referee: A Barry (sarsfields)

5 May 2019 Round 1	St. Finbarr's	0-14 - 0-13	Douglas	Páirc Uí Rinn, Cork
	S Callinan (0-4, 3 frees); S O’Leary, J Goggin (free, 65), K Hodgins (0-2 each); I O’Callaghan, E Dennehy, E Maher, C Barrett (0-1 each).	Report	E Dolan (0-9, 8 frees, 65); A Ward, C Baldwin, J Collins, D Hanrahan (0-1 each).	Referee: J Murphy (Castletownroche)

8 May 2019 Round 1	Mayfield	1-16 - 0-20	Sarsfields	Páirc Uí Rinn, Cork
	N Kelly (0-7, 0-5 frees), S Duggan (1-3), S Kelly and D O’Neill (0-2 each), M J Coffey and G Looney (0-1 each).	Report	D Walsh (0-10, 0-7 frees, 0-2 65s), D Allen (0-4), J O’Leary and C Duggan (0-2 each), K Murphy and J Sweeney (0-1 each).	Referee: G Ahern (Canovee)

=== Round 2 ===
2 August 2019 Round 2	Barryroe	1-11 - 4-17	St. Catherine's	Cloughduv
	J Murphy 0-5, L O'Donovan 1-0, C Sheehy 0-2, D O'Driscoll 0-2, R Kiely 0-1, J Fleming 0-1.		B Mulcahy 1-7, P Roche 2-0, S O'Brien 0-5, D Mangan 0-4, R Galvin 1-0, C Kearney 0-1.	Referee: N Wall (Carrigaline)

2 August 2019 Round 2	Milford	1-11 - 4-16	Midleton	O'Connell Park, Glantane
	H O'Gorman 1-10, E Dillon 0-1.		A Mulcahy 0-10, K Mulcahy 2-1, P O'Brien 1-1, I Kennefick 1-0, P O'Keeffe 0-2, J Nagle 0-1, K Farmer 0-1.	Referee: J Horgan (Gleann na Laoi)

5 August 2019 Round 2	Dripsey	1-15 - 1-11	Na Piarsaigh	Ballincollig
	M O'Riordan 0-8, E Maher 1-5, J Carey 0-1, J Cotter 0-1.		K Moynihan 0-5, K Waters 1-0, E Dorgan 0-1, C Murphy 0-1, A Dennehy 0-1, G Joyce 0-1, E Hanifin 0-1, P Murphy 0-1.	Referee: M O'Mahony (Kilbrittain)

11 August 2019 Round 2	Kilbrittain	0-14 - 1-15	Dungourney	Manning Park, Passage
	M Sexton 0-7, R Cashman 0-2, T Harrington 0-2, P Wall 0-1, M Madden 0-1, E Lyons 0-1.		B Ahern 0-5, Shane Hegarty 0-4, R Denny 1-0, C Griffin 0-3, N Motherway 0-1, Seán Hegearty 0-1, C Sweeney 0-1.	Referee: C Egan (Glen Rovers)

15 August 2019 Round 2	Douglas	2-17 - 1-14	Ballinhassig	Ovens
	A Ward 1-4, E Dolan 0-5, J Moylan 1-0, C O'Donovan 0-2, D Murphy 0-2, C Baldwin 0-2, M Dolan 0-1, S Donegan 0-1.		D O'Donovan 0-6, E Heffernan 1-2, D O'Sullivan 0-2, B Lombard 0-2, D Brennan 0-1, R Lombard 0-1.

31 August 2019 Round 2	Mayfield	0-18 - 0-16	Kildorrery	Rathcormac
	N Kelly 0-10, S Duggan 0-3, G Looney 0-2, D O'Neill 0-1, MJ Coffey 0-1, S O'Donovan 0-1.		P O'Brien 0-8, F Stapleton 0-4, D Kent 0-2, J Keating 0-1, D Kelly 0-1.	Referee: M Murphy (Bride Rovers)

=== Round 3 ===
11 August 2019 Round 3	Blackrock	3-16 - 0-14	Grenagh	Inniscarra
	E O'Farrell 0-9, O Kelleher 2-1, L O'Sullivan 1-3, J Golden 0-1, D Cormack 0-1, B Cain 0-1.		S Bourke 0-5, T Kenny 0-3, P McSweeney 0-1, P Barry-Murphy 0-1, K O'Neill 0-1, U Duggan 0-1, M O'Riordan 0-1, A O'Neill 0-1.	Referee: B Barry-Murphy (Aghabullogue)

11 August 2019 Round 3	Aghabullogue	0-18 - 0-16	Glen Rovers	Inniscarra
	S Tarrant 0-6, I Barry-Murphy 0-4, P Ring 0-4, P Twomey 0-2, N Buckley 0-1, L Casey 0-1.		P Virgo 0-7, E O'Connell 0-4, S Busteed 0-2, K McCarthy 0-1, D Busteed 0-1, M Dooley 0-1.	Referee: J Larkin (Ballinora)

11 August 2019 Round 3	Ballygarvan	0-11 - 2-20	Sarsfields	Manning Park, Passage
	M Kennefick 0-6, M Cussen 0-2, D O'Connor 0-1, R O'Halloran 0-1, E Aherne 0-1.		C Duggan 1-10, C Darcy 1-2, K Murphy 0-2, D Allen 0-1, D Roche 0-1, E Murphy 0-1, T Murphy 0-1, R Murphy 0-1, J O'Leary 0-1.	Referee: M O'Mahony (Kilbrittain)

11 August 2019 Round 3	Meelin	3-16 - 1-17	Ballymartle	Donoughmore
	E Brosnan 2-7, J O'Callaghan 0-5, W Murphy 1-1, S Hehir 0-1, John Forrest 0-1, James Forrest 0-1.		B Dwyer 1-14, J McCarthy 0-1, D Kelly 0-1, E O'Leary 0-1.	Referee: P Lyons (Bishopstown)

17 August 2019 Round 3	Midleton	0-13 - 0-18	Tracton	Ballinora
	A Mulcahy 0-7, K Mulcahy 0-3, S Finn 0-2, P O'Keeffe 0-1.		R Walsh 0-5, J Good 0-5, J Kingston 0-4, S O'Sullivan 0-2, A Kiely 0-1, D O'Flaherty 0-1.	Referee: C Dineen (Douglas)

23 August 2019 Round 3	Castlemartyr	3-11 - 3-14	St. Catherine's	Páirc Lios gCúl, Lisgoold
	J Stack 2-2, M Kelly 0-7, B Lawton 1-0, D Moran 0-1, M Cosgrove 0-1.		S O'Brien 0-6, B O'Brien 1-0, C Kearney 1-0, N O'Regan 1-0, S Cotter 0-3, D Mangan 0-2, R Galvin 0-1, B Mulcahy 0-1, P Roche 0-1.	Referee: N O'Neill (Midleton)

24 August 2019 Round 3	Dungourney	2-11 - 1-15	Cloughduv	Riverstown
	Shane Hegarty 2-2, B Ahern 0-4, R Denny 0-3, M Leahy 0-1, C Griffin 0-1.		B Verling 1-10, M Walsh 0-3, D Corkery 0-1, A Murphy 0-1.	Referee: C Egan (Glen Rovers)

31 August 2019 Round 3	St. Finbarr's	0-11 - 2-18	Argideen Rangers	Riverstick
	D Scannell 0-4, J Goggin 0-3, J Power 0-1, C Buckley 0-1, E Maher 0-1, J O'Brien 0-1.		JM O'Callaghan 0-7, M O'Callaghan 1-3, D O'Donovan 1-0, F Butler 0-2, C Smith 0-2, J Sheehan 0-1, M Lawton 0-1, P Butler 0-1, V Lovell 0-1.	Referee: L O'Riordan (Belgooly)

7 September 2019 Round 3	Mayfield	0-18 - 2-20	Éire Óg	Páirc Uí Rinn, Cork
	N Kelly 0-8 (0-7 f), D Lucey 0-4, S O'Donovan 0-3 f, MJ Coffey 0-2, S Duggan 0-1.	Report	John Cooper 1-3, D Goulding 1-2, E O'Shea 0-5 (0-2 f, 0-1 65), Joe Cooper, C O'Callaghan, K Hallissey 0-3 each, R O'Toole 0-1.	Referee: C Egan (Glen Rovers)

7 September 2019 Round 3	Dripsey	2-13 - 3-17	Douglas	Ballincollig
	M O'Riordan 0-10, E Maher 1-2, M O'Sullivan 1-0, E O'Connell 0-1.		D Murphy 1-6, M Dolan 1-3, C Russell 1-2, J Murphy 0-3, B O'Connor 0-1, A O'Connell 0-1, L Dineen 0-1.	Referee: M O'Mahony (Kilbrittain)

=== Round 4 ===
7 September 2019 Round 4	Blackrock	0-31 - 2-16	Tracton	Páirc Liam Mhic Cárthaigh, Ballygarvan
	E O'Farrell 0-9, O Kelleher 0-8, M O'Keeffe 0-5, R Cotter 0-4, C O'Leary 0-3, L O'Sullivan 0-1, P Kennedy 0-1.		R Walsh 0-9, J Good 2-1, M O'Sullivan 0-2, C McGuinness 0-2, D O'Flaherty 0-1, K Kingston 0-1.	Referee: M Maher (St. Finbarr's)

14 September 2019 Round 4	St. Catherine's	1-14 - 1-18	Éire Óg	Páirc Lios gCúl, Lisgoold
	S O'Brien 0-11, B o'Brien 1-0, C Hegarty 0-1, R Galvin 0-1, P Keane 0-1.		E O'Shea 0-11, C O'Callaghan 1-0, K Hallissey 0-2, John Cooper 0-1, Joe Cooper 0-1, D Corcoran 0-1, D Kirwin 0-1, R O'Leary 0-1.	Referee: B Sweeney (Shamrocks)

=== Relegation play-offs ===
7 September 2019 Play-off	Castlemartyr	3-16 - 3-14	Ballinhassig	Manning Park, Passage
	M Kelly 0-10, J McGann 2-0, A Bowens 1-1, N O'Donovan 0-1, J Stack 0-1, Brian Lawton 0-1, S Hennessy 0-1, Barry Lawton 0-1.		D O'Donovan 1-3, A O'Mahony 0-5, G Sheehan 1-1, R Lombard 1-0, D O'Sullivan 0-2, D Delea 0-1, B Lombard 0-1, D Brennan 0-1.	Referee: P Lyons (Bishopstown)

14 September 2019 Play-off	Kildorrery	1-13 - 0-13	Kilbrittain	Donoughmore
	P O'Brien 0-5, J McEniry 0-4, D Kent 1-0, F Stapleton 0-2, S O'Neill 0-2.		M Sexton 0-8, M Madden 0-2, P Wall 0-1, D Harrington 0-1, I Burke 0-1.	Referee: P Lyons (Bishopstown)

28 September 2019 Play-off	Kilbrittain	0-14 - 1-12	Milford	Blarney
	M Sexton 0-9, D Harrington 0-2, R Cashman 0-1, M Madden 0-1, T Harrington 0-1.		E Dillon 0-9, J Sheehan 1-0, B Murphy 0-2, M O'Flynn 0-1.	Referee: G Aherne (Cloughduv)

28 September 2019 Play-off	Na Piarsaigh	1-18 - 3-13	Barryroe	Riverstick

5 October 2019 Play-off	Ballinhassig	1-10 - 1-15	Na Piarsaigh	Ballincollig
	D O'Donovan 0-5, B Lombard 1-1, B O'Sullivan 0-2, D Brennan 0-1, A O'Leary 0-1.		K Waters 1-2, P Gould 0-4, G Joyce 0-3, C Bowen 0-2, E McCarthy 0-2, C O'Mahony 0-1, R O'Meara 0-1.	Referee: A Barry (Sarsfields)

12 October 2019 Play-off	Na Piarsaigh	2-06 - 4-16	Kilbrittain	Ballinhassig
	G Joyce 1-0, K Waters 1-0, C Bowen 0-2, E McCarthy 0-2, C O'Flynn 0-1, E Dorgan 0-1.		P Wall 3-2, M Sexton 1-5, S Shorten 0-3, C O'Leary 0-2, M Madden 0-1, B Butler 0-1, T Sheehan 0-1, A Holland 0-1.	Referee: L O'Riordan (Belgooly)

19 October 2019 Play-off	Ballinhassig	4-08 - 2-13	Kilbrittain	Páirc Uí Ríogáin, Ballinspittle
	D O'Donovan 1-4, R Lombard 1-0, A O'Mahony 1-0, É Heffernan 1-0, B O'Sullivan 0-3, D Brennan 0-1.		M Sexton 0-7, P Wall 1-0, D Harrington 1-0, R Cashman 0-2, C Harrington 0-2, M Madden 0-1, C O'Leary 0-1.	Referee: B Coniry (Crosshaven)

=== Quarter-finals ===
14 September 2019 Quarter-final	Cloughduv	1-22 - 1-11	Meelin	Banteer
	M Verling 1-5, B Verling 0-8, E Clifford 0-2, M Walsh 0-2, S O'Connor 0-1, A Murphy 0-1, D Corkery 0-1, L Kelleher 0-1, J Ryan 0-1.		E Brosnan 0-7, S Hehir 1-0, John Forrest 0-1, James Forrest 0-1, J Curtin 0-1, SM O'Sullivan 0-1.	Referee: C Egan (Glen Rovers)

14 September 2019 Quarter-final	Aghabullogue	1-17 - 0-11	Douglas	Ballincollig
	M Bradley 1-7, S Tarrant 0-5, I Barry-Murphy 0-3, P Ring 0-1, P Twomey 0-1.		M Dolan 0-5, K Doyle 0-2, A O'Connell 0-2, B O'Connor 0-1, D Murphy 0-1.

15 September 2019 Quarter-final	Sarsfields	1-13 - 1-10	Argideen Rangers	Brinny
	D Walsh 1-1, C Duggan 0-4, J O'Leary 0-3, T Murphy 0-3, K Roche 0-1, C English 0-1.		F Butler 1-2, M O'Callaghan 0-5, JM O'Callaghan 0-3.	Referee: D Daly (Brian Dillons)

5 October 2019 Quarter-final	Éire Óg	0-13 - 3-13	Blackrock	Ballincollig
	E O'Shea 0-8, J Cooper 0-2, B Corcoran 0-1, D Goulding 0-1, K Hallissey 0-1.		E O'Farrell 0-6, O Kelleher 1-2, C Cain 1-0, C O'Leary 1-0, I O'Keeffe 0-2, M O'Farrell 0-2, M O'Keeffe 0-1.	Referee: C O'Leary (Ballyhea)

=== Semi-finals ===
28 September 2019 Semi-final	Sarsfields	1-11 - 1-15	Cloughduv	Blarney
	C Duggan 0-8, C Darcy 1-0, T Murphy 0-1, C Kelleher 0-1, S O'Driscoll 0-1.		B Verling 0-7, M Verling 1-2, A Murphy 0-2, D Corkery 0-1, M Walsh 0-1, S O'Connor 0-1, J Ryan 0-1.	Referee: D Daly (Brian Dillons)

9 November 2019 Semi-final	Aghabullogue	1-15 - 1-18	Blackrock	Páirc Uí Rinn, Cork
	S Tarrant 0-7 (0-3 f, 0-1 65), I Barry Murphy 0-4, P Ring 1-0, P Twomey 0-2, N Barry-Murphy, D Dineen 0-1 each.	Report	E O’Farrell (0-1 f, 0-1 65), O Kelleher 0-5 each, D Cashman 1-0, C O’Leary, L O’Sullivan 0-3 each, R Cantwell, R Cotter 0-1 each.	Referee: C McAllister (Aghada)

=== Final ===
16 November 2019 Final	Cloughduv	1-10 - 0-15	Blackrock	Páirc Uí Rinn, Cork
	B Verling (0-8) (6 frees); M Verling (1-0) (pen); S O’Connor, J Ryan (0-1 each).	Report	E O’Farrell (0-10) (6 frees, 1 65); D Cormack, M O’Keeffe, C O’Leary, D Cashman, O Kelleher (0-1 each)	Referee: E McCarthy (Bandon)

== Championship statistics ==
=== Top scorers ===
Top scorer overall

Rank	Player	Club	Tally	Total	Matches	Average
1	Brian Verling	Cloughduv	1-43	46	5	9.20
2	Maurice Sexton	Kilbrittain	1-42	45	6	7.50
3	Eoin O'Farrell	Blackrock	0-42	42	6	7.00
4	Éamonn Brosnan	Meelin	3-24	33	3	11.00
5	Shane O'Brien	St. Catherine's	0-31	31	4	7.75
6	Olan Kelleher	Blackrock	4-17	29	6	4.83
6	Donncha O'Donovan	Ballinhassig	2-23	29	5	5.80
7	Cormac Duggan	Sarsfields	1-24	27	4	6.75
7	Ronan Walsh	Tracton	0-27	27	3	9.00
7	Shane Tarrant	Aghabullogue	0-27	27	4	6.75

Top scorers in a single game

Rank	Player	Club	Tally	Total	Opposition
1	Barry Dwyer	Ballymartle	1-14	17	Meelin
2	Éamonn Brosnan	Meelin	2-07	13	Ballymartle
2	Cormac Duggan	Sarsfields	1-10	13	Ballygarvan
2	Brian Verling	Cloughduv	1-10	13	Dungourney
2	Henry O'Gorman	Milford	1-10	13	Midleton
2	Éamonn Brosnan	Meelin	1-10	13	Midleton
2	Ronan Walsh	Tracton	0-13	13	Kildorrery
3	Ryan Denny	Dungourney	0-12	12	Éire Óg
4	Evan O'Connell	Glen Rovers	0-11	11	Barryroe
4	Seán Bourke	Grenagh	0-11	11	Na Piarsaigh
4	Mark Kennefick	Ballygarvan	0-11	11	Dripsey
4	Shane O'Brien	St. Catherine's	0-11	11	Éire Óg
4	Eoin O'Shea	Éire Óg	0-11	11	St. Catherine's

=== Miscellaneous ===
- Blackrock win their first Intermediate title.
