= 1999 All-Ireland Minor Football Championship =

Gaelic football competition

Championship details

All-Ireland Champions
- Winning team: Down (3rd win)

All-Ireland Finalists
- Losing team: Mayo

Provincial Champions
- Munster: Cork
- Leinster: Dublin
- Ulster: Down
- Connacht: Mayo

The 1999 All-Ireland Minor Football Championship was the 68th staging of the All-Ireland Minor Football Championship, the Gaelic Athletic Association's premier inter-county Gaelic football tournament for boys under the age of 18.

Tyrone entered the championship as defending champions, however, they were defeated in the Ulster Championship.

On 26 September 1999, Down won the championship following a 1–14 to 0–14 defeat of Mayo in the All-Ireland final. This was their third All-Ireland title overall and their first in 12 championship seasons.

== Results ==
=== Connacht Minor Football Championship ===
Quarter-final

May 1999 Quarter-Final	Roscommon	0-9 - 0-4	Leitrim	Dr Hyde Park, Roscommon

Semi-finals

June 1999 Semi-Final	Galway	0-16 - 0-9	Sligo	Markievicz Park, Sligo

June 1999 Semi-Final	Mayo	1-19 - 2-4	Roscommon	St Jarlath's Park, Tuam

Final

18 July 1999 Final	Mayo	3-3 - 1-6	Galway	St Jarlath's Park, Tuam

=== Leinster Minor Football Championship ===
Preliminary round

May 1999 Preliminary Round	Dublin	5-21 - 0-5	Carlow	Parnell Park, Dublin

May 1999 Preliminary Round	Kildare	0-16 - 2-8	Longford	Pearse Park, Longford

May 1999 Preliminary Round	Laois	1-14 - 0-4	Louth	Dundalk

May 1999 Preliminary Round	Meath	0-9 - 0-7	Wicklow	Aughrim Park, Aughrim

Quarter-finals

June 1999 Quarter-Final	Kilkenny	0-2 - 0-19	Kildare	Geraldine Park, Athy

June 1999 Quarter-Final	Offaly	2-6 - 0-9	Laois	O'Moore Park, Portlaoise

June 1999 Quarter-Final	Wexford	2-11 - 1-9	Meath	Páirc Tailteann, Navan

June 1999 Quarter-Final	Dublin	3-14 - 0-7	Westmeath	Parnell Park, Dublin

Semi-finals

July 1999 Semi-Final	Dublin	4-11 - 3-7	Offaly	Croke Park, Dublin

July 1999 Semi-Final	Kildare	0-11 - 1-11	Wexford	Croke Park, Dublin

Final

1 August 1999 Final	Dublin	1-13 - 2-10	Wexford	Croke Park, Dublin

7 August 1999 Final Replay	Dublin	2-13 - 1-12	Wexford	Dr Cullen Park, Carlow

=== Munster Minor Football Championship ===
Rob robin

1999 Rob robin	Limerick	2-11 - 0-9	Waterford	Gaelic Grounds, Limerick

1999 Rob robin	Tipperary	1-5 - 4-9	Clare	FitzGerald Park, Kilmallock

1999 Rob robin	Limerick	3-9 - 1-6	Clare	Cusack Park, Ennis

1999 Rob robin	Tipperary	1-10 - 2-0	Waterford	Semple Stadium, Thurles

Semi-finals

20 June 1999 Semi-Final	Kerry	0-15 - 0-7	Clare	Cusack Park, Ennis

20 June 1999 Semi-Final	Cork	1-18 - 1-5	Limerick	Páirc Uí Chaoimh, Cork

Final

18 July 1999 Final	Cork	2-16 - 1-8	Kerry	Páirc Uí Chaoimh, Cork

=== Ulster Minor Football Championship ===
Preliminary round

May 1999 Preliminary Round	Derry	0-13 - 1-9	Cavan	Celtic Park, Derry

Quarter-finals

June 1999 Quarter-Final	Fermanagh	2-8 - 2-7	Monaghan	St Tiernach's Park, Clones

June 1999 Quarter-Final	Donegal	0-11 - 0-10	Armagh	MacCumhaill Park, Ballybofey

June 1999 Quarter-Final	Down	2-14 - 3-4	Antrim	Pairc Esler, Newry

June 1999 Quarter-Final	Tyrone	1-12 - 1-6	Fermanagh	St Tiernach's Park, Clones

Semi-finals

July 1999 Semi-Final	Donegal	2-10 - 1-12	Derry	St Tiernach's Park, Clones

July 1999 Semi-Final	Down	1-12 - 1-6	Tyrone	Casement Park, Belfast

Final

1 August 1999 Final	Down	0-10 - 0-10	Donegal	St Tiernach's Park, Clones

7 August 1999 Final Replay	Down	2-7 - 0-9	Donegal	St Tiernach's Park, Clones

=== All-Ireland Minor Football Championship ===
Semi-finals

22 August 1999 Semi-Final	Mayo	1-19 - 2-9	Cork	Croke Park, Dublin

29 August 1999 Semi-Final	Down	0-13 - 1-10	Dublin	Croke Park, Dublin

4 September 1999 Semi-Final Replay	Down	2-14 - 1-9	Dublin	Páirc Tailteann, Navan

Final

26 September 1999 Final	Down	1-14 - 0-14	Mayo	Croke Park, Dublin
