= Grenagh GAA =

Gaelic games club in County Cork, Ireland

Grenagh
- Greanach
- Founded: 1934
- County: Cork
- Colours
- Grounds: Grenagh GAA Grounds

Playing kits
Standard colours

Grenagh GAA Club is a Gaelic Athletic Association club in Grenagh, County Cork, Ireland. The club is affiliated to the Muskerry Board and fields teams in both hurling and Gaelic football.

A junior club since 2022, the first team currently competes in the Mid Cork Junior A Hurling Championship, the sixth tier of the Cork club hurling.

== History ==
Located in the village of Grenagh, about 18km from Cork, Grenagh GAA Club was established in 1934. The club has spent the majority of its existence operating in the junior grades as a dual club. Grenagh made their hurling breakthrough in 1958 when the Mid Cork JAHC title was won for the first time. A second divisional title eight years later was followed by a lengthy fallow period.

Grenagh had their most successful period in terms of divisional hurling between 1995 and 2013 when 10 Mid Cork JAHC titles were won. This period culminated with the club winning the Cork JAHC title in 2013, following a 1–10 to 2–05 win over Kilbrin.

Four Mid Cork JAFC titles were also won by the club between 1993 and 2006. In Grenagh's first year in the Cork IFC in 2007, the club claimed the title after a 2–13 to 0–13 defeat of Carrigaline in the final. This was followed six years later with a second Cork IFC title.

== Honours ==
- Cork Intermediate Football Championship (2): 2007, 2013
- Cork Junior A Hurling Championship (1): 2013
- Mid Cork Junior A Hurling Championship (12): 1958, 1966, 1995, 1999, 2000, 2001, 2003, 2004, 2005, 2007, 2012, 2013
- Mid Cork Junior A Football Championship (4): 1993, 2000, 2001, 2006
- Cork Minor B Hurling Championship (1): 1997
- Cork Minor B Football Championship (1): 1997

== Notable players ==
- Tom Kenny: All-Ireland SHC-winner (2004, 2005)
- Denis Murphy: All-Ireland SHC-winner (1966)
- Aidan Dorgan
- Paul Coleman
