= 1962 Cork Intermediate Hurling Championship =

Irish hurling competition

- Dates: 22 April – 16 September 1962
- Teams: 12
- Champions: Midleton (2nd title); V. Flanagan (captain)
- Runners-up: Cobh; M. Aherne (captain)

Tournament statistics
- Matches played: 12
- Goals scored: 72 (6 per match)
- Points scored: 115 (9.58 per match)

The 1962 Cork Intermediate Hurling Championship was the 53rd staging of the Cork Intermediate Hurling Championship since its establishment by the Cork County Board in 1909. The draw for the opening round fixtures took place on 28 January 1962. The championship ran from 22 April to 16 September 1962.

The final was played on 16 September 1962 at Riverstown Sportsfield, between Midleton and Cobh, in what was their first ever meeting in the final. Midleton won the match by 3–08 to 2–03 to claim their second championship title overall and a first title in 14 years.

== Results ==
=== First round ===
22 April 1962 First round	Tracton	2-06 - 4-10	Cloyne	Cork Athletic Grounds

13 May 1962 First round	Cobh	3-10 - 2-01	St Finbarr's	Clonmult Memorial Park

20 May 1962 First round	Carrigaline	3-06 - 1-03	Castletownroche	Cork Athletic Grounds

27 May 1962 First round	Ballymartle	5-08 - 4-02	Bandon	Ballinhassig Grounds

=== Quarter-finals ===
22 April 1962 Quarter-final	Glen Rovers	2-08 - 3-00	Rathluirc	Bishop Casey Memorial Park

22 April 1962 Quarter-final	Midleton	1-06 - 2-03	Fermoy	Páirc Mhic Gearailt

3 June 1962 Quarter-final replay	Midleton	4-03 - 2-07	Fermoy	Riverstown Sportsfield

10 June 1962 Quarter-final	Ballymartle	2-03 - 7-09	Cobh	Cork Athletic Grounds

10 June 1962 Quarter-final	Cloyne	2-12 - 2-02	Carrigaline	Cork Athletic Grounds

=== Semi-finals ===
15 July 1962 Semi-final	Midleton	3-10 - 4-05	Glen Rovers	Riverstown Sportsfield

22 July 1962 Semi-final	Cobh	7-04 - 2-06	Cloyne	Clonmult Memorial Park

=== Final ===
16 September 1962 Final	Midleton	3-08 - 2-03	Cobh	Riverstown Sportsfield
	V Flanagan 1-3, F Walsh 2-0, P Fitzgerald 0-2, D O'Brien 0-1, C O'Sullivan 0-1.		P Meaney 1-1, J Dorney 1-0, J O'Connell 0-1, J Ahern 0-1.
