= 2026 Cork Premier Senior Hurling Championship =

Annual hurling competition season

- Dates: 9 June – 18 October 2026
- Teams: 12 clubs 6 divisions 1 university
- Sponsor: Co-Op Superstores
- Champions: Glen Rovers (28th title); Adam Lynch (captain); Tomás Mulcahy (manager)
- Runners-up: St Finbarr's; Brian Hayes (captain); Paudie Murray (manager)
- Relegated: Douglas

Tournament statistics
- Matches played: 29
- Goals scored: 82 (2.83 per match)
- Points scored: 1196 (41.24 per match)
- Top scorer(s): Patrick Horgan (1–57)

The 2026 Cork Premier Senior Hurling Championship was the seventh staging of the Cork Premier Senior Hurling Championship and the 138th staging overall of a championship for the top-ranking hurling teams in Cork. The draw for the group stage placings took place on 9 December 2025. The championship ran from 9 June to 18 October 2026.

Sarsfields were the defending champions, however, they were beaten by Kanturk in the quarter-finals. Douglas's relegation brought an end to 17 years of top tier hurling for the club.

The final was played on 18 October 2026 at SuperValu Páirc Uí Chaoimh in Cork, between St Finbarr's and Glen Rovers, in what was their 12th meeting in the final overall and a first meeting in the final in 38 years. Glen Rovers won the match by 2–20 to 0–23 to claim their 28th championship title overall and a first title in 10 years.

Patrick Horgan was the championship's top scorer with 1–57.

== Team changes ==
=== To Championship ===
Promoted from the Cork Senior A Hurling Championship

- Bride Rovers

=== From Championship ===
Relegated to the Cork Senior A Hurling Championship

- Erin's Own

== Group 1 ==
=== Group 1 table ===
Quarter-finalist Relegation playoff

| Team | Matches | | | | Score | | | Pts |
| Team | Pld | W | D | L | For | Against | Diff | Pts |
|---|---|---|---|---|---|---|---|---|
| Kanturk | 3 | 2 | 0 | 1 | 94 | 72 | 22 | 4 |
| Glen Rovers | 3 | 2 | 0 | 1 | 79 | 73 | 6 | 4 |
| Blackrock | 3 | 2 | 0 | 1 | 85 | 85 | 0 | 4 |
| Fr O'Neill's | 3 | 0 | 0 | 3 | 71 | 99 | -28 | 0 |

=== Group 1 results ===
| 1 August 2026 Round 1 | Kanturk | 3-25 - 2-15 | Fr O'Neill's | Moore Park |
| | B O’Sullivan 0-7 (0-4 f, 0-1 65), C Walsh 1-3, L O’Keeffe 1-2, A Walsh 1-0, P Walsh 0-3, C Noonan, L O’Neill, R Walsh 0-2 each, L McLoughlin, D O’Connell, J Fitzpatrick, I Walsh 0-1 each. | Report | D Dalton 1-5 (0-4 f, 0-1 sl), John Millerick 1-4 each, J Hankard 0-2, K O’Sullivan, M O’Keeffe, Joe Millerick, P McMahon 0-1 each. |

| 1 August 2026 Round 1 | Blackrock | 1-22 - 1-20 | Glen Rovers | Páirc Uí Rinn |
| | A Connolly 1-10 (0-5f, 0-1 65), M O’Halloran, R Cotter 0-3 each, N Cashman 0-2, T Deasy, K O’Keeffe, Ciarán Cormack, R Sweeney 0-1 each. | Report | P Horgan 0-6 (0-3f), M Mullins 1-2, S Kennefick, E Downey 0-3 each, D Brosnan, E O’Leary, L Quilligan 0-2 each. |

| 23 August 2026 Round 2 | Fr O'Neill's | 2-23 - 3-29 | Blackrock | Clonmult Memorial Park |
| | D Dalton 0-11 (0-9 f), B Dunne 1-2, K O’Sullivan 0-4, J Hankard 1-0, M O’Keeffe, J Millerick 0-2 each, P O’Sullivan, M Wall 0-1 each. | Report | R Cotter 3-2, A Connolly 0-9 (0-7 f), PJ Linehan, M O’Halloran 0-5 each, K O’Keeffe 0-2, A O’Callaghan, D Meaney, T Deasy, N Cashman, M O’Keeffe, R Sweeney 0-1 each. |

| 23 August 2026 Round 2 | Glen Rovers | 3-20 - 1-24 | Kanturk | Castletownroche Grounds |
| | E O’Leary 2-3, P Horgan 0-7 (0-5f, 0-1 65), S Kennefick 1-4, D Brosnan 0-3, C McCarthy 0-2, D Noonan 0-1. | Report | B O’Sullivan 1-15 (1-0 penalty, 0-9f, 0-1 65, 0-1 sl), P Walsh, A Walsh, C Walsh 0-2 each C Noonan, D O’Connell, L O’Neill 0-1 each. |

| 6 September 2026 Round 3 | Blackrock | 2-16 - 2-27 | Kanturk | Mourneabbey Grounds |
| | A Connolly 1-4 (0-3 f, 0-1 65, 1-0 pen), R Cotter 1-2, F Coleman 0-4, K O’Keeffe 0-2, T Deasy, P Linehan, M O’Keeffe, M O’Halloran 0-1 each. | Report | B O’Sullivan 1-12 (0-10 f, 0-1 65, 1-0 pen), A Walsh, C Walsh 0-4 each, L O’Keeffe 1-0, L McLoughlin, C Noonan 0-2 each, L O’Neill, D O’Connell, I Walsh 0-1 each. |

| 6 September 2026 Round 3 | Glen Rovers | 1-24 - 3-12 | Fr O'Neill's | Páirc Shéamuis de Barra |
| | P Horgan 0-10 (0-7 f), E O’Leary 1-2, M Mullins 0-4, E Downey, L Quilligan 0-2 each, R Downey, R Dunne, D Noonan, C McCarthy 0-1 each. | Report | J Hankard 2-0, D Dalton 0-6 (0-5 f), B Dunne 1-1, M O’Keeffe 0-2, P Hassett, John Millerick, C O’Leary 0-1 each. |

== Group 2 ==
=== Group 2 table ===
Quarter-finalist Relegation playoff

| Team | Matches | | | | Score | | | Pts |
| Team | Pld | W | D | L | For | Against | Diff | Pts |
|---|---|---|---|---|---|---|---|---|
| Charleville | 3 | 2 | 0 | 1 | 60 | 57 | 3 | 4 |
| Sarsfields | 3 | 2 | 0 | 1 | 83 | 69 | 14 | 4 |
| Newtownshandrum | 3 | 1 | 1 | 1 | 72 | 75 | -3 | 3 |
| Douglas (R) | 3 | 0 | 1 | 2 | 58 | 72 | -16 | 1 |

=== Group 2 results ===
| 31 July 2026 Round 1 | Douglas | 0-22 - 2-16 | Newtownshandrum | Ballyhooly Grounds |
| | S Kingston 0-11 (0-6 f, 0-2 65), R Dooley, B Turnbull, C O’Donovan 0-2 each, A O’Connell, J O’Brien, A Cadogan, M O’Brien, J Harte 0-1 each. | Report | J Coughlan 1-12 (0-8 f, 0-1 65), R Geary 1-0, T O’Neill 0-2, C O’Brien, E O’Mahony 0-1 apiece. |

| 1 August 2026 Round 1 | Sarsfields | 0-19 - 0-21 | Charleville | Castletownroche Grounds |
| | D Hogan 0-8 (0-6 f), C O’Sullivan 0-3, S O’Regan, B O’Flynn 0-2 each, J O’Connor, L Hackett, C Darcy, C McCarthy 0-1 each. | Report | D Fitzgibbon 0-11 (0-8 f), D Forde 0-4 (0-2 SL), C Buckley 0-3, D Butler, T Hawe, Z Biggane 0-1 each. |

| 22 August 2026 Round 2 | Newtownshandrum | 4-14 - 4-21 | Sarsfields | Mallow GAA Complex |
| | T O’Mahony 1-4 (0-2f, 0-1 65), J Coughlan 0-5f, C O’Brien, J O’Leary, C Griffin 1-0, M Lenihan, R Geary, D O’Connor, Robert Troy, T O’Neill 0-1 each. | Report | B O’Flynn 1-7 (0-7f), J Sweeney 2-1, B Nodwell 1-1, J O’Connor, D Kearney 0-3 each, Cathal McCarthy 0-2 C Darcy, C Roche, L Elliott, L Hackett 0-1 each. |

| 22 August 2026 Round 2 | Charleville | 0-19 - 0-14 | Douglas | Mallow GAA Complex |
| | D Fitzgibbon (0-7, 5 frees); S Bresnan, Z Biggane, R Carroll (0-2 each); D Forde, G Gleeson, T Hawe, C Buckley, G Kelleher, J Madigan (0-1 each). | Report | S Kingston (0-8, 7 frees); Cillian O’Donovan (0-2); J O’Brien, R Dooley, E O’Flynn (0-1 each). |

| 6 September 2026 Round 3 | Douglas | 1-19 - 3-22 | Sarsfields | Páirc Uí Rinn |
| | S Kingston 1-10 (0-5f), R Dooley, C O’Donovan (0-1f) 0-3 each, M O’Brien, S O’Leary, C Kingston 0-1 each. | Report | D Hogan 0-11 (0-5f, 0-1 65), J O’Connor 0-4, Cathal McCarthy, C Roche, L Hackett 1-0 each, S O’Regan, C Darcy 0-2 each, C Leahy, D Kearney, J Sweeney 0-1 each. |

| 6 September 2026 Round 3 | Newtownshandrum | 1-21 - 1-17 | Charleville | Páirc Mhic Ghiobúin |
| | J Coughlan (0-11, 0-9 frees, 0-1 65), C O’Brien (0-4, 0-2 sl), Robert Troy (1-0), C Griffin (0-2), D O’Connor, R Geary, P Noonan and T O’Neill (0-1 each). | Report | D Forde (0-10 frees), T Hawe (1-0), S Bresnan (0-3), J Callaghan, R Carroll, G Kelleher and F Cagney (0-1 each). |

== Group 3 ==
=== Group 3 table ===
Semi-finalist Quarter-finalist

| Team | Matches | | | | Score | | | Pts |
| Team | Pld | W | D | L | For | Against | Diff | Pts |
|---|---|---|---|---|---|---|---|---|
| Midleton | 3 | 3 | 0 | 0 | 67 | 56 | 11 | 6 |
| St Finbarr's | 3 | 1 | 1 | 1 | 68 | 67 | 1 | 3 |
| Bride Rovers | 3 | 1 | 0 | 2 | 63 | 65 | -2 | 2 |
| Newcestown | 3 | 0 | 1 | 2 | 55 | 65 | -10 | 1 |

=== Group 3 results ===
| 31 July 2026 Round 1 | Midleton | 0-25 - 0-17 | St Finbarr's | Páirc Uí Rinn |
| | C Lehane 0-9 (0-6f), K McDermott 0-6, P Connaughton 0-3, M Finn, A Quirke 0-2 each, C Walsh, D Cremin, R O’Regan 0-1 each. | Report | B Cunningham 0-8 (0-7f), C McCarthy, W Buckley, C Cahalane 0-2 each, B Hayes, D Cahalane, E Twomey 0-1 each. |

| 1 August 2026 Round 1 | Bride Rovers | 1-20 - 0-14 | Newcestown | Páirc Uí Chonchúir |
| | A Walsh 1-7 (0-7 f), B Roche 0-4, R O’Connell 0-3, C Tobin, C Hogan (2 fs) 0-2 each, Cormac Barry, P O’Flynn 0-1 each. | Report | R O’Sullivan 0-9 (0-7 f), D Buckley 0-2, L Meade, C Dineen, N Kelly 0-1 each. |

| 22 August 2026 Round 2 | Newcestown | 1-17 - 1-18 | Midleton | Páirc Uí Rinn |
| | R O’Sullivan 0-6 (0-4 f, 0-1 65), S O’Donovan 1-2, D Buckley, C Dinneen 0-3 each, E Collins, C Hurley, J Meade 0-1 each. | Report | C Lehane 0-8 (0-3 f, 0-1 65), R O’Regan 1-0, D Cremin, C Morley 0-2 each, B Saunderson, T Dunlea, C Walsh, T O’Connell, M Finn, C Beausang 0-1 each. |

| 22 August 2026 Round 2 | St Finbarr's | 3-21 - 1-18 | Bride Rovers | Páirc Uí Rinn |
| | B Cunningham (2-4, 0-2 frees); W Buckley (0-7); B Hayes (0-3); J Wigginton Barrett (1-0); S Daly (0-2); C Doolan, E Twomey, C McCarthy, J O’Kelly, J Cahalane (0-1 each). | Report | C Barry (0-5, 0-3 frees, 0-1 ‘65); C Tobin (1-1); P O’Flynn (0-3, 0-1 free); K Kearney, A Walsh (two frees), R O’Connell (0-2 each); D Barry, B Roche L Roche (0-1 each). |

| 6 September 2026 Round 3 | Midleton | 2-15 - 2-13 | Bride Rovers | Caherlag Grounds |
| | P Connaughton (1-2); C Lehane (0-5, 0-1 free, 0-1 '65); A Quirke (1-1); M Finn, D Cremin (0-2 each); C Walsh, C Beausang, E McGrath (0-1 each). | Report | C Barry (0-7, 0-4 frees, 0-2 65s); R O'Connell (1-2); D Barry (1-0); B Roche, P O'Flynn (free), C O'Riordan, L Roche (0-1 each). |

| 6 September 2026 Round 3 | St Finbarr's | 1-18 - 0-21 | Newcestown | St Mary's Park |
| | W Buckley 0-4, B Cunningham (2f), C Cahalane 0-3 each, R Barrett 1-0, D Cahalane, J Murray, E Twomey, S Cunningham, C Doolan, E Finn, S Daly, S Hurley 0-1 each. | Report | R O’Sullivan 0-6 (6f), J Meade, N Kelly 0-3 each, C Wilson (2f), D Buckley, J Kelleher 0-2 each, C Dineen, E Wilson, L Meade 0-1 each. |

== Division/colleges section ==
=== Division/colleges section round 1 ===
| 9 June 2026 Round 1 | Seandún | w/o - scr. | Avondhu | Páirc na Brian Diolúnaigh |
| | | Report |

| 9 June 2026 Round 1 | Duhallow | scr. - w/o | Muskerry | Meelin Grounds |
| | | Report |

=== Division/colleges section round 2 ===
| 23 June 2026 Round 2 | Carbery | 0-25 - 1-25 (aet) | Seandún | Éire Óg Grounds |
| | D O’Donovan (0-1 sl), M Cahalane (0-6 f, 0-1 65) 0-7 each, R Crowley, M Hickey 0-2 each, K Twohig, L Hourihane, J Lucey, S Murnane (0-1 f), L Dooley, D Collins, D McCarthy 0-1 each. | Report | D Barrett 1-4 (0-1 sl), S Daly (0-1 f), R Quirke (0-2 f, 0-1 65), S O’Donovan (0-2 f, 0-1 65) 0-5 each, C O’Donovan 0-4 (0-3 f), L Harrington, D Malone 0-1 each. | Referee: K O’Sullivan (Valley Rovers) |

=== Division/colleges section semi-finals ===
| 5 August 2026 Semi-final | University College Cork | 0-19 - 4-26 | Imokilly | Clonmult Memorial Park |
| | H O’Connor 0-9 (0-4f), J Dwyer 0-3 (0-1 65), L O’Riordan, P O’Callaghan 0-2 each, F Desmond, L Murphy 0-1 each. | Report | J Leahy 2-7 (0-3f), C O’Callaghan 2-1, M Kelly 0-4, A Sherlock, J Casey, W Leahy, D Healy, C Cahill 0-2 each, J Murray, M McCarthy, E Davis (0-1f), D O’Brien 0-1 each. |

| 9 August 2026 Semi-final | Seandún | 1-30 - 0-32 (aet) | Muskerry | Ballinlough Grounds |
| | D Barrett 0-5 (0-3f, 0-1 65), T O’Neill, B Murphy (0-1f) 0-4 each, J Hegarty 1-1, S Daly 0-3, D Daly, N McCarthy, D Barrett, S O’Reilly 0-2 each, T Harrington (0-1f) L Calnan, M Coffey, E O’Sullivan, L Malone 0-1 each. | Report | M Bradley 0-17 (0-11f, 0-1 65), T Morgan, P Ring, S Hurley, J Foley 0-2 each, D Desmond (0-1f), C O’Driscoll, S Joyce, C Quirke, M O’Connell, D Holland, B Mayer 0-1 each. |

=== Division/colleges section final ===
| 30 August 2026 Final | Imokilly | 3-22 - 1-18 | Seandún | Páirc Uí Rinn |
| | J Leahy 1-10 (0-7f), C O’Callaghan 1-2, S O’Donoghue 1-1, W Leahy, M Kelly 0-2 each, T Wilk, M O’Dwyer, A Lynch, N Cahill, O Fitzgerald 0-1 each. | Report | R Quirke 0-9 (0-8f, 0-1 65), S Daly 1-2, B Murphy 0-3 (0-1f, 0-1 65), D Daly, E O’Sullivan, D Barrett, N Kelly 0-1 each. |

== Relegation stage ==
=== Relegation final ===
| 20 September 2026 Playoff | Douglas | 0-18 - 2-19 | Fr O'Neill's | Páirc Shéamuis de Barra |
| | S Kingston (0-9, 0-3 frees), M Howell and J O’Brien (0-2 each), J Harte, C Lucas, C Kingston, C Baldwin and Conor O’Donovan (0-1 each). | Report | D Dalton (0-8, 0-4 frees, 0-1 65, 0-1 sl), J Hankard (1-1), P Hassett (1-0), K O’Sullivan (0-3), B Dunne, M Wall, G Millerick, D Harrington, M O’Keeffe, John Millerick, and P McMahon (0-1 each). |

== Knockout stage ==
=== Quarter-finals ===
| 20 September 2026 Quarter-final | Kanturk | 4-19 - 1-25 | Sarsfields | Mallow GAA Complex |
| | B O’Sullivan 0-10 (0-8 f, 0-1 65), C Walsh 1-4, L O’Keeffe 1-2, A Walsh, L O’Neill 1-0 each, P Walsh, R Sheahan, D O’Connell 0-1 each. | Report | D Hogan 0-7 (0-7 f), B O’Flynn 1-2, Cathal McCarthy 0-5, B Murphy, J O’Connor, E Murphy 0-2 each, D English, K Murphy, C Roche, B Graham (0-1 f), J Sweeney 0-1 each. |

| 20 September 2026 Quarter-final | Charleville | 1-20 - 2-22 | Glen Rovers | Mallow GAA Complex |
| | D Forde 0-6 (0-4f, 0-1 65), D Fitzgibbon 0-5 (0-3f), C Buckley 1-1, Z Biggane, S Bresnan, T Hawe 0-2 each, R Carroll J Callaghan 0-1 each. | Report | P Horgan 1-12 (0-8f), S Kennefick 1-2, E O’Leary, L Quilligan, D Brosnan, B Moylan 0-2 each. |

| 20 September 2026 Quarter-final | St Finbarr's | 1-24 - 1-13 | Imokilly | Clonmult Memorial Park |
| | B Cunningham (0-4 f), W Buckley (0-7 each), D Cahalane 1-0, C Cahalane, E Twomey, E Finn (0-2 each), J Wigginton-Barrett, J O’Kelly, B Hayes, S Cunningham (0-1 each). | Report | J Murray (0-5, 0-4 f), C Cahill 1-1, M Kelly, W Leahy (0-2 each), O Fitzgerald, J Kennefick, A Lynch (0-1 each). |

=== Semi-finals ===
| 4 October 2026 Semi-final | Kanturk | 1-22 - 1-27 | St Finbarr's | SuperValu Páirc Uí Chaoimh |
| | Brian O’Sullivan (0-9, 0-7 frees); A Walsh (1-2); C Walsh, D O’Connell (0-3); L O’Neill (0-2); D Browne, C Noonan, P Walsh (0-1 each). | Report | B Cunningham (0-10, 0-5 frees); E Twomey (1-4); B Hayes (0-5); W Buckley, E Finn (0-2 each); J O’Kelly, S Cunningham, J Wigginton-Barrett, J Cahalane (0-1 each). |

| 4 October 2026 Semi-final | Midleton | 1-18 - 2-20 | Glen Rovers | SuperValu Páirc Uí Chaoimh |
| | C Lehane (0-7, 3 frees); P Connaughton (1-3); C Walsh (0-3); P White (0-2); D Cremin, R O’Regan, C Beausang (0-1 each) | Report | P Horgan (0-11, 8 frees); M Mullins (2-0); S Kennefick, D Brosnan (0-3 each); E O’Leary (0-2); L Quilligan, L Horgan (0-1 each). |

=== Final ===
| 18 October 2026 Final | St Finbarr's | 0-23 - 2-20 | Glen Rovers | SuperValu Páirc Uí Chaoimh |
| | E Twomey, B Cunningham (0-5f) 0-6 each, B Hayes 0-3, W Buckley, S Cunningham 0-2 each, C Walsh, J Wigginton Barrett, R Barrett, C Doolan 0-1 each. | Report | P Horgan 0-11 (0-8f), E O’Leary 2-2, R Dunne 0-3, D Brosnan 0-2, M Mullins, S Kennefick 0-1 each. | Attendance: 19,041; Referee: W King (Banteer) |

== Championship statistics ==
=== Top scorers ===
Overall

| Rank | Player | Club | Tally | Total | Matches | Average |
|---|---|---|---|---|---|---|
| 1 | Patrick Horgan | Glen Rovers | 1-57 | 60 | 6 | 10.00 |
| 2 | Brian O'Sullivan | Kanturk | 2-53 | 59 | 5 | 11.80 |
| 3 | Ben Cunningham | St Finbarr's | 2-38 | 44 | 6 | 7.33 |
| 4 | Shane Kingston | Douglas | 1-38 | 41 | 4 | 10.25 |
| 5 | Declan Dalton | Fr O'Neill's | 1-30 | 33 | 4 | 8.25 |
| 6 | Jamie Coughlan | Newtownshandrum | 1-28 | 31 | 3 | 10.33 |
| 7 | Alan Connolly | Blackrock | 2-23 | 29 | 3 | 9.66 |
| 7 | Conor Lehane | Midleton | 0-29 | 29 | 4 | 7.25 |
| 9 | Eoin O'Leary | Glen Rovers | 5-13 | 28 | 6 | 4.66 |
| 10 | Jack Leahy | Imokilly | 3-17 | 26 | 2 | 13.00 |
| 10 | Daniel Hogan | Sarsfields | 0-26 | 26 | 3 | 8.66 |

Single game

| Rank | Player | Club | Tally | Total | Opposition |
|---|---|---|---|---|---|
| 1 | Brian O'Sullivan | Kanturk | 1-15 | 18 | Glen Rovers |
| 2 | Matthew Bradley | Muskerry | 0-17 | 17 | Seandún |
| 3 | Patrick Horgan | Glen Rovers | 1-12 | 15 | Charleville |
| 3 | Jamie Coughlan | Newtownshandrum | 1-12 | 15 | Douglas |
| 3 | Brian O'Sullivan | Kanturk | 1-12 | 15 | Blackrock |
| 6 | Jack Leahy | Imokilly | 2-07 | 13 | UCC |
| 6 | Jack Leahy | Imokilly | 1-10 | 13 | Seandún |
| 6 | Shane Kingston | Douglas | 1-10 | 13 | Sarsfields |
| 6 | Alan Connolly | Blackrock | 1-10 | 13 | Glen Rovers |
| 10 | Robbie Cotter | Blackrock | 3-02 | 11 | Fr O'Neill's |
| 10 | Declan Dalton | Fr O'Neill's | 0-11 | 11 | Blackrock |
| 10 | Darragh Fitzgibbon | Charleville | 0-11 | 11 | Sarsfields |
| 10 | Shane Kingston | Douglas | 0-11 | 11 | Newtownshandrum |
| 10 | Daniel Hogan | Sarsfields | 0-11 | 11 | Douglas |
| 10 | Jamie Coughlan | Newtownshandrum | 0-11 | 11 | Charleville |
| 10 | Patrick Horgan | Glen Rovers | 0-11 | 11 | Midleton |
| 10 | Patrick Horgan | Glen Rovers | 0-11 | 11 | St Finbarr's |
