= 2019 Cork Premier Intermediate Hurling Championship =

- Dates: 19 April 2019 – 12 October 2019
- Teams: 16
- Sponsor: The Echo
- Champions: Fr. O'Neill's (1st title); Mark O'Keeffe (captain); Dan Harrington (captain); Dave Colbert (manager); James O'Connor (manager)
- Runners-up: Kilworth

Tournament statistics
- Matches played: 23
- Goals scored: 62 (2.7 per match)
- Points scored: 764 (33.22 per match)
- Top scorer(s): Declan Dalton (3-45)

The 2019 Cork Premier Intermediate Hurling Championship was the 16th staging of the Cork Premier Intermediate Hurling Championship since its establishment by the Cork County Board in 2004. The draw for the opening round fixtures took place on 15 January 2019. The championship began on 19 April 2019 and ended on 12 October 2019.

On 12 October 2019, Fr. O'Neill's won the championship after a 3-23 to 1-20 defeat of Kilworth in the final at Páirc Uí Rinn. It was their first ever championship title in this grade.

Declan Dalton from the Fr. O'Neill's club was the championship's top scorer with 3-45.

== Team changes ==
=== To Championship ===
Promoted from the Cork Intermediate Hurling Championship

- Ballincollig

=== From Championship ===
Promoted to the Cork Senior Hurling Championship

- Charleville

== Results ==
=== Round 1 ===
19 April 2019 Round 1	Fr. O'Neill's	1-22 - 2-14	Ballincollig	Páirc Séamus de Barra, Carrigtwohill
	D Dalton (0-6, 0-4 frees, 0-1 65), L O’Driscoll (0-4), M O’Keeffe (1-1), B Dunne (0-3), T Millerick and J Hankard (0-2 each), C Broderick, J Millerick and E Conway (0-1 each).	Report	S Walsh (0-8, 0-7 frees), P O’Neill and K Walsh (1-1 each), JP Murphy, D Bowen, R Bourke and L Fahy (0-1 each).	Referee: M O'Mahony (Kilbrittain)

19 April 2019 Round 1	Inniscarra	0-13 - 1-16	Watergrasshill	Páirc Uí Rinn, Cork
	P Holland 0-7 (all frees), S O’Donoghue 0-2, O McCarthy, D O’Keeffe, D Hughes and S O’Mahony 0-1 each.	Report	S O’Regan 0-9 (0-8 frees), P O’Leary 1-1, S Óg O’Regan 0-3 (0-1 sideline), E Barry, A Cronin and D McCarthy 0-1 each.	Referee: C Egan (Glen Rovers)

20 April 2019 Round 1	Castlelyons	2-17 - 1-12	Youghal	St. Catherine's Park, Ballynoe
	M Spillane 0-7, A Fenton 1-3, D Morrison 1-0, J Kearney 0-2, N O'Leary 0-2, K O'Leary 0-1, A Spillane 0-1, R O'Regan 0-1.		J O'Mahony 1-1, A Joyce 0-4, B Cooper 0-4, A Frahill-O'Connor 0-2, D O'Connell 0-1.	Referee: C Egan (Glen Rovers)

21 April 2019 Round 1	Blarney	0-24 - 2-12	Ballinhassig	Ballincollig Sportsfield, Ballincollig
	M Coleman (0-10, 0-7 frees, 0-1 65, 0-1sl), S Barrett (0-5), P Power (0-3), R Murphy (0-2), J Jordan, S Crowley, K Costello and D Hanlon (0-1 each).	Report	K McCarthy (1-1), P Coomey (1-0), F O’Leary (0-3), Colin Reynolds, S Coleman and C Tyers (0-2 each), C Desmond and S McCarthy (0-1 each).	Referee: S Crowley (Argideen Rangers)

21 April 2019 Round 1	Mallow	3-15 - 1-20	Carrigaline	Ballincollig Sportsfield, Ballincollig
	S Hayes 2-7, S O'Callaghan 1-0, P Herlihy 0-3, P Lyons 0-2, D Hayes 0-1, J O'Hanlon 0-1, K Mills 0-1.		B Kelleher 0-12, E Desmond 1-2, D Grffin 0-2, R O'Shea 0-2, D Drake 0-1, C Barry 0-1.	Referee: G Scully (Killeagh)

28 April 2019 Round 1	Fermoy	1-23 - 1-22 (aet)	Courcey Rovers	Páirc Uí Rinn, Cork
	L Coleman (0-14, 0-10 f); M Brennan (0-3); T Clancy (1-0); S Aherne (0-2); K Morrison, J Molloy, J Ring, D Lardner (0-1 each).	Report	T O’Sullivan (0-9, 0-7 f, 0-1 65); S Twomey (1-2); O Crowley (0-3); S Nyhan (0-2 f), J McCarthy (0-2 each); K Moloney, R Sweetnam, J O’Neill, M O’Donovan (0-1 each).	Referee: M Maher (St. Finbarr's)

28 April 2019 Round 1	Kilworth	0-20 - 0-12	Valley Rovers	Páirc Uí Rinn, Cork
	L Whelan 0-5, W Condon 0-5, E Carey 0-4, N McNamara 0-3, J Sheehan 0-2, N Byrne 0-1.	Report	C O’Leary 0-4 f, E O’Reilly 0-3, J Cottrell, C Butler, R Butler, E Delaney, A Kenneally 0-1 each.	Referee: S Stokes (Tullylease)

5 May 2019 Round 1	Cloyne	0-14 - 2-13	Aghada	Castlemartyr Sportsfield, Castlemartyr
	P O’Sullivan (0-4, 2 frees, 1 ’65); K Dennehy (0-3, 1 free); M Cahill D Cahill and B O’Shea (0-1 s/line, 0-1 pen) (0-2 each); C Motherway (0-1).	Report	C Fleming (2-1); M Russell (0-5, 4 frees, 1 ’65); M McCarthy (1 free, 1 ’65) and T Hartnett (0-2 each); D Creedon, A Berry and K O’Hanlon (0-1 each).	Referee: G Scully (Killeagh)

=== Round 2 ===
2 August 2019 Round 2	Cloyne	0-18 - 1-20	Valley Rovers	Church Road, Blackrock
	K Dennehy 0-7, B Walsh 0-2, C Mullins 0-2, M Cahill 0-2, B Minihane 0-1, C Motherway 0-1, C O'Sullivan 0-1, D O'Sullivan 0-1, A Walsh 0-1.		C O'Leary 0-12, C Butler 1-2, J Walsh 0-3, K Canty 0-2, A Kenneally 0-1.	Referee: C Lyons (Nemo Rangers)

10 August 2019 Round 2	Courcey Rovers	1-11 - 0-16	Ballincollig	Brinny
	T O'Sullivan 0-5, R Sweetnam 0-5, S Nyhan 1-0, S Twomey 0-1.		S Walsh 0-8, L Fahy 0-2, F Denny 0-1, C O'Leary 0-1, D Bowen 0-1, C O'Sullivan 0-1, JP Murphy 0-1, R Bourke 0-1.	Referee: I McCarthy (Bandon)

10 August 2019 Round 2	Ballinhassig	0-12 - 3-12	Inniscarra	Ovens
	S Coleman 0-5, G Collins 0-2, C Tyers 0-2, P Collins 0-1, C Reynolds 0-1, F O'Leary 0-1.		C Casey 3-3, M Coleman 0-3, O McCarthy 0-2, S O'Donoghue 0-1.	Referee: D Farrell

31 August 2019 Round 2	Youghal	1-13 - 3-15	Carrigaline	Páirc Séamus de Barra, Carrigtwohill
	L Desmond 1-1, S Smiddy 0-4, B Cooper 0-2, J O'Mahony 0-2, A Frahill-O'Connor 0-1, B Ring 0-1, C Spillane 0-1, A Joyce 0-1.		B Kelleher 2-10, P Ronayne 1-1, R O'Shea 0-3, D Drake 0-1.	Referee: M Maher (St. Finbarr's)

=== Round 3 ===
17 August 2019 Round 3	Ballincollig	1-11 - 1-17	Valley Rovers	Cloughduv
	S Walsh 0-6, C O'Leary 1-1, JP Murphy 0-2, P O'Neill 0-1, K Walsh 0-1.		C O'Leary 0-10, J Walsh 1-3, K Canty 0-2, C Butler 0-1, R O'Sullivan 0-1.	Referee: S Stokes (Tullylease)

17 August 2019 Round 3	Inniscarra	1-16 - 0-15	Mallow	Grenagh
	C Casey 1-2, M Coleman 0-4, O McCarthy 0-4, A McCarthy 0-2, C Lombard 0-1, S O'Donoghue 0-1, C Bennett 0-1, P Holland 0-1.		S Hayes 0-8, C Murphy 0-3, K Sheehan 0-2, D Moynihan 0-1, R Harkin 0-1.	Referee: B Murphy (Carrigtwohill)

7 September 2019 Round 3	Aghada	2-10 - 3-21	Carrigaline	Riverstown
	W Leahy 1-6 (1-3 f, 0-1 65), P O’Neill 1-1, M McCarthy, C Terry, A Staffod 0-1 each.	Report	B Kelleher 2-10 (0-2 f, 0-2 65), K McIntyre 1-1, D Drake (0-1 sl) 0-2, R O’Shea, E Desmond, C Vaughan 0-2 each, W O’Brien, S Willamson 0-1 each.	Referee: J Larkin (Ballinora)

8 September 2019 Round 3	Fr. O'Neill's	5-14 - 2-12	Fermoy	Ballynoe
	D Dalton 1-7 (0-5 frees, 0-1 ’65), P McMahon 2-0, B Dunne 1-3, M O’Keeffe 1-1, R Cullinane, J Hankard and K O’Sullivan 0-1 each.	Report	T Clancy and J Hutchings 1-1 each, B O’Sullivan (0-1 free) and B O’Sullivan (0-1 free) 0-3 each, S Aherne 0-2, K Morrison, J Scannell and P de Róiste 0-1 each.	Referee: I McCarthy (Bandon)

=== Quarter-finals ===
14 September 2019 Quarter-final	Kilworth	1-25 - 4-12	Carrigaline	Watergrasshill
	N McNamara 0-10 (0-7 f, 0-1 65), J Sheehan 1-3, W Condon 0-4, L Whelan and E Carey 0-3 each, B Tobin 0-2.	Report	R O’Shea 2-2 (1-1 f), B Kelleher 0-7 (0-2 f), P Ronayne and K McIntyre 1-0 each, W O’Brien, D Drake and E Desmond 0-1 each.	Referee: C McAllister (Aghada)

14 September 2019 Quarter-final	Castlelyons	1-18 - 0-23	Inniscarra	Riverstown Sportsfield, Sallybrook
	A Spillane 1-3, M Spillane 0-5 f, K O'Leary 0-3, B Murphy 0-2, A Fenton, D Morrison, N O'Leary, E Maye, T Carroll 0-1 each.	Report	M Coleman 0-10 (0-4 f), C Casey, O McCarthy 0-4 each, A Fenton 0-2, S O'Donoghue, E O'Connor, M O'Connell 0-1 each.	Referee: D Farrell Jnr (Mitchelstown)

14 September 2019 Quarter-final	Blarney	3-22 - 3-14	Valley Rovers	Páirc Uí Rinn, Cork
	S Barrett 1-6, M Coleman (1-3 f) 1-5, K Costello 1-1, P Power 0-4, D Hanlon 0-3, R Murphy 0-2, P Crowley 0-1.	Report	C O’Leary (0-5 f, 0-1 sl) 0-9, C Butler, J Cottrell 1-1 each, K Canty 1-0, A Sheehan, J Walsh, R O’Sullivan 0-1 each.	Referee: B Murphy (Carrigtwohill)

15 September 2019 Quarter-final	Watergrasshill	1-14 - 1-21	Fr. O'Neill's	Clonmult Memorial Park, Midleton
	S O’Regan 0-9 (0-8 f, 0-1 65), S O’Callaghan 1-1, S Óg O’Regan 0-3, K O’Neill 0-1.	Report	D Dalton 1-10 (1-0 pen, 0-7 f), E Conway 0-3, B Dunne 0-2, R Cullinane, K O’Sullivan, M O’Keeffe, J Millerick, P McMahon, J Millerick 0-1 each.	Referee: I McCarthy (Bandon)

=== Semi-finals ===
29 September 2019 Semi-final	Kilworth	2-16 - 0-15	Inniscarra	Páirc Uí Rinn, Cork
	N McNamara 1-10 (0-8 frees). J Sheehan 1-1, B Tobin 0-2, L Whelan, E Carey, W Condon 0-1 each.	Report	M Coleman 0-6 (frees), C Casey 0-4, E O’Connor 0-3, A McCarthy 0-2.	Referee: B Murphy (Carrigtwohill)

29 September 2019 Semi-final	Fr. O'Neill's	1-20 - 1-18	Blarney	Páirc Uí Rinn, Cork
	D Dalton 0-11 (0-5 f, 0-1 65, 0-1 sideline), B Dunne 1-1, K O’Sullivan 0-2, M O’Keeffe, R Cullianne, P McMahon, E Conway, L O’Driscoll, J Hankard 0-1 each.	Report	M Coleman 0-9 (0-5 f, 0-1 65, 0-1 sideline), S Barrett 1-1, D Hanlon, A McEvoy 0-3 each, P Power 0-2.	Referee: M Maher (St. Finbarr's)

=== Final ===
12 October 2019 Final	Kilworth	1-20 - 3-23	Fr. O'Neill's	Páirc Uí Rinn, Cork
	N McNamara 0-11 (0-10 f), E Carey 1-4 (0-2 f), L Whelan, J Sheehan, E McGrath, B Tobin, W Condon 0-1 each.	Report	D Dalton 1-11 (0-5 f, 0-1 65, 1-0 pen), B Dunne 1-3, P McMahon 1-1, J Millerick 0-3, K O’Sullivan 0-2, E Conway, C Broderick, M O’Keeffe 0-1.:	Referee: S Stokes (Tullylease)

== Championship statistics ==
=== Scoring events ===
- Widest winning margin: 14 points
  - Carrigaline 3-21 - 2-10 Aghada (Round 3)
- Most goals in a match: 7
  - Fr. O'Neill's 5-14 - 2-12 Fermoy (Round 3)
- Most points in a match: 45
  - Fermoy 1-23 - 1-22 Courcey Rovers (Round 1)
- Most goals by one team in a match: 5
  - Fr. O'Neill's 5-14 - 2-12 Fermoy (Round 3)
- Most goals scored by a losing team: 3
  - Valley Rovers 3-14 - 3-22 Blarney (Quarter-final)
- Most points scored by a losing team: 22
  - Courcey Rovers 1-22 - 1-23 Fermoy (Round 3)

=== Top scorers ===
Top scorer overall

Rank	Player	Club	Tally	Total	Matches	Average
1	Declan Dalton	Fr. O'Neill's	3-45	54	5	10.80
2	Brian Kelleher	Carrigaline	4-39	51	4	12.75
3	Noel McNamara	Kilworth	1-34	37	4	9.25
4	Chris O'Leary	Valley Rovers	0-31	31	4	7.75
5	Cathal Casey	Inniscarra	4-13	25	5	5.00
5	Mark Coleman	Blarney	1-22	25	3	8.33
7	Michael Coleman	Inniscarra	0-23	23	4	5.75
8	Seán Walsh	Ballincollig	0-22	22	3	7.33
9	Seán Hayes	Mallow	2-15	21	2	10.50
10	Shane Barrett	Blarney	2-12	18	3	6.00
10	Shane O'Regan	Watergrasshill	0-18	18	2	9.00

Top scorers in a single game

Rank	Player	Club	Tally	Total	Opposition
1	Brian Kelleher	Carrigaline	2-10	16	Youghal
1	Brian Kelleher	Carrigaline	2-10	16	Aghada
3	Declan Dalton	Fr. O'Neill's	1-11	14	Kilworth
3	Liam Coleman	Fermoy	0-14	14	Courcey Rovers
5	Seán Hayes	Mallow	2-07	13	Carrigaline
5	Declan Dalton	Fr. O'Neill's	1-10	13	Watergrasshill
5	Noel McNamara	Kilworth	1-10	13	Inniscarra
8	Cathal Casey	Inniscarra	3-03	12	Ballinhassig
8	Brian Kelleher	Carrigaline	0-12	12	Mallow
8	Chris O'Leary	Valley Rovers	0-12	12	Cloyne
