= 2015 Cork Intermediate Hurling Championship =

Irish hurling competition

- Dates: 16 May 2015 – 24 October 2015
- Teams: 16
- Sponsor: Evening Echo
- Champions: Charleville (4th title); Michael O'Flynn (captain); Claude Gough (manager)
- Runners-up: Dripsey; Diarmuid O'Riordan (captain); Ger Gibbons (manager)

Tournament statistics
- Matches played: 28
- Goals scored: 79 (2.82 per match)
- Points scored: 793 (28.32 per match)
- Top scorer(s): Diarmuid O'Riordan (2-41)

The 2015 Cork Intermediate Hurling Championship was the 106th staging of the Cork Intermediate Hurling Championship since its establishment by the Cork County Board in 1909. The draw for the opening round fixture took place on 14 December 2014. The championship ran from 16 May to 24 October 2015.

The final was played on 24 October 2015 at Páirc Uí Rinn in Cork, between Charleville and Dripsey, in what was their first ever meeting in the final. Charleville won the match by 5–24 to 1–10 to claim their fourth championship title overall and a first championship title in 68 years.

Dripsey's Diarmuid O'Riordan was the championship's top scorer with 2-41.

== Team changes ==
=== To Championship ===
Promoted from the Cork Junior Hurling Championship

- Castlemartyr

Relegated from the Cork Premier Intermediate Hurling Championship

- Kilbrittain

=== From Championship ===
Promoted to the Cork Premier Intermediate Hurling Championship

- Fermoy

Relegated to the East Cork Junior A Hurling Championship

- St Catherine's

== Results ==
=== First round ===
16 May 2015 First round	Ballygarvan	2-14 - 2-13	Éire Óg	Brinny Sportsfield
	D McCarthy 2-7, S White 0-2, G White 0-2, R Cassidy 0-2, Donald O'Sullivan 0-1.		E O'Shea 1-7, C Murphy 1-3, P McDonagh 0-1, C O'Mahony 0-1, J Dineen 0-1.

17 May 2015 First round	Barryroe	1-07 - 1-21	Aghada	Páirc Liam Mhic Cárthaigh
	G Whelton 1-1, C Hurley 0-4, K Griffin 0-2.		W Leahy 0-6, J Looney 0-6, K O'Hanlon 1-1, A Stafford 0-3, T Hartnett 0-1, S O'Keeffe 0-1, D Creedon 0-1, E Healy 0-1, P Wall 0-1.

17 May 2015 First round	Ballincollig	0-18 - 1-16 (aet)	Kilbrittain	Charlie Hurley Park
	C Dorgan 0-9, F Kelly 0-4, C Moore 0-1, I Coughlan 0-1, C Sexton 0-1, R Burke 0-1, E Ryle 0-1.		M Sexton 1-10, R Cashman 0-2, Pat O'Mahony 0-1, D Desmond 0-1, A Hayes 0-1, D Harrington 0-1.

23 May 2015 First round	Milford	0-16 - 0-24	Fr. O'Neill's	Ballyhooly Grounds
	P O'Regan 0-7, H O'Gorman 0-4, A Watson 0-3, E Dillon 0-1, T O'Flynn 0-1.		D Dalton 0-10, L O'Driscoll 0-4, B Dunne 0-3, J Millerick 0-2, P McMahon 0-2, K O'Sullivan 0-2, P Butler 0-1.

24 May 2015 First round	Argideen Rangers	2-10 - 3-14	Charleville	Coachford Sportsfield
	JM O'Callaghan 0-6, R O'Sullivan 1-2, F Butler 1-0, P Butler 0-1, J Sheehan 0-1.		A Cagney 2-8, J Barry 1-1, D O'Flynn 0-3, D Murphy 0-1, M Kavanagh 0-1.

24 May 2015 First round	Kildorrery	2-16 - 2-13	Castlemartyr	Páirc na Bríde
	P O'Brien 0-8, A O'Brien 1-0, T Condon 1-0, D Kiely 0-2, F Stapleton 0-2, M Walsh 0-2, A O'Brien 0-1, W Fouhy 0-1.		Barry Lawton 1-8, C Haines 1-0, E Clifford 0-3, Barra Ó Tuama 0-1, J Stack 0-1.

30 May 2015 First round	Dripsey	0-12 - 3-13	Meelin	Banteer Sportsfield
	D O'Riordan 0-7, David O'Sullivan 0-2, M O'Sullivan 0-2, Dean O'Sullivan 0-1.		J O'Callaghan 1-9, TJ Brosnan 1-2, J O'Sullivan 1-1, B O'Sullivan 0-1.

30 May 2015 First round	Grenagh	0-14 - 0-10	Aghabullogue	Páirc Dhónaill Uí Cheallacháin
	T Kenny 0-7, U Duggan 0-2, P McSweeney 0-2, S Burke 0-1, D Dalton 0-1, C O'Neill 0-1.		P Finnegan 0-6, J Buckley 0-1, G Murphy 0-1, D Twomey 0-1, J Corkery 0-1.

=== Second round ===
31 May 2015 Second round	Ballincolig	0-16 - 0-09	Barryroe	Brinny Sportsfield
	D Dorgan 0-7, C Sexton 0-3, I Coughlan 0-2, C O'Sullivan 0-2, D Bowen 0-1, R Burke 0-1.		K Griffin 0-3, G Whelton 0-2, J O'Donovan 0-2, D O'Sullivan 0-1, D Kiely 0-1.

13 June 2015 Second round	Castlemartyr	2-17 - 0-07	Aghabullogue	Mayfield Grounds
	Barry Lawton 1-8, Brian Lawton 0-4, C Haines 1-0, E Clifford 0-1, Barra Ó Tuama 0-1, B Smiddy 0-1, J Smiddy 0-1, J Stack 0-1.		P Finnegan 0-4, D O'Connell 0-1, N Buckley 0-1, M O'Flynn 0-1.

13 June 2015 Second round	Dripsey	1-15 - 0-17	Milford	Dr Croke Memorial Park
	D O'Riordan 0-8, M O'Sullivan 1-2, M O'Riordan 0-3, D O'Sullivan 0-2.		P O'Regan 0-10, E Dillon 0-2, C O'Gorman 0-2, S Whelan 0-2, H O'Gorman 0-1.

20 June 2015 Second round	Éire Óg	2-18 - 2-15 (aet)	Argideen Rangers	Páirc Liam Mhic Cárthaigh
	J Dineen 0-8, P McDonagh 1-2, D Goulding 0-4, L Murphy 1-0, A O'Mahony 0-2, D Desmond 0-1, M O'Shea 0-1.		JM O'Callaghan 1-4, F Butler 1-2, J Sheehan 0-3, R O'Sullivan 0-2, M O'Callaghan 0-2, C Smith 0-1, M Walsh 0-1.

=== Third round ===
28 June 2015 Third round	Milford	2-16 - 1-17	Barryroe	Coachford Sportsfield
	H O'Gorman 2-1, P O'Regan 0-7, C O'Gorman 0-3, S Whelan 0-3, E Dillon 0-1, P O'Brien 0-1.		J O'Donovan 0-11, M O'Brien 1-1, D Harrington 0-2, D O'Sullivan 0-1, T Harrington 0-1, J Fleming 0-1.

4 July 2015 Third round	Argideen Rangers	6-15 - 2-22	Aghabullogue	Brinny Sportsfield
	R O'Sullivan 3-0, J O'Callaghan 0-7, B Hennessy 1-2, M Walsh 1-2, F Butler 1-0, John Sheehan 0-2, P Butler 0-1, M O'Callaghan 0-1.		P Finnegan 0-10, J Buckley 2-1, I Barry-Murphy 0-4, J Corkery 0-3, K Finnegan 0-2, M O'Flynn 0-1, S O'Sullivan 0-1.

=== Relegation playoff ===
27 September 2015 Playoff	Barryroe	1-11 - 2-11	Aghabullogue	Brinny Sportsfield
	J O'Donovan 0-6, C Cahalane 1-0, D O'Sullivan 0-1, K Hurley 0-1, M O'Brien 0-1, R Kiely 0-1, A Fleming 0-1.		P Finnegan 1-7, I Barry-Murphy 1-2, D Twomey 0-2.

=== Fourth round ===
17 July 2015 Fourth round	Milford	1-18 - 1-11	Ballygarvan	Coachford Sportsfield
	P O'Regan 1-9, C O'Gorman 0-2, H O'Gorman 0-2, A Watson 0-1, E Dillon 0-1, P O'Brien 0-1, S Whelan 0-1, D Hannigan 0-1.		M Kennefick 0-6, M O'Callaghan 1-0, D McCarthy 0-2, M Riordan 0-1, S Buckley 0-1, S White 0-1.

25 July 2015 Fourth round	Dripsey	1-15 - 1-12	Grenagh	Páirc Eoin Mhic Charthaigh
	D O'Riordan 0-12, David O'Sullivan 1-0, Dean O'Sullivan 0-1, M O'Sullivan 0-1, P O'Riordan 0-1.		T Kenny 0-8, S Cronin 1-1, U Duggan 0-2, S Bourke 0-1.

1 August 2015 Fourth round	Aghada	2-14 - 1-11	Castlemartyr	Páirc Uí Chinnéide
	W Leahy 0-7, J Looney 1-1, T Hartnett 1-0, P Wall 0-3, P O'Neill 0-2, C Fleming 0-1.		Barry Lawton 1-5, B Smiddy 0-1, C Haines 0-1, E Clifford 0-1, Brian Ó Tuama 0-1, Barra Ó Tuama 0-1, J Stack 0-1.

2 August 2015 Fourth round	Ballincollig	0-09 - 1-05	Argideen Rangers	Kilbrittain Grounds
	C Dorgan 0-6, D Collins 0-2, D Bowen 0-1.		JM O'Callaghan 0-4, B Hennessy 1-0, R O'Sullivan 0-1.

2 August 2015 Fourth round	Kildorrery	1-11 - 1-05	Éire Óg	Mallow GAA Complex
	P O'Brien 1-5, E O'Connor 0-2, A O'Brien 0-2, D Kelly 0-1, W Fouhy 0-1.		D Goulding 1-1, M O'Shea 0-1, D Desmond 0-1, J Dineen 0-1, C O'Shea 0-1.

9 August 2015 Fourth round	Meelin	3-18 - 3-19	Fr. O'Neill's	Kildorrery Grounds
	E Brosnan 0-9, J Curtin 1-2, James Forrest 1-0, W Murphy 1-0, DJ O'Sullivan 0-3, J O'Callaghan 0-2, John Forrest 0-1, L Collins 0-1.		D Dalton 1-8, B Dunne 1-2, P McMahon 0-5, P Butler 1-0, K O'Sullivan 0-1, B Murphy 0-1, C Broderick 0-1, M O'Keeffe 0-1.

- Charleville and Kilbrittain received byes in this round.

=== Quarter-finals ===
16 August 2015 Quarter-final	Charleville	1-19 - 0-06	Kilbrittain	Páirc Uí Rinn
	D O'Flynn 0-5, D Fitzgibbon 0-5, M Kavanagh 0-4, D Murphy 1-0, J O'Brien 0-2, A Cagney 0-1, A O'Connor 0-1, D Casey 0-1.		M Sexton 0-5, C Hickey 0-1.

22 August 2015 Quarter-final	Fr. O'Neill's	1-18 - 0-15	Milford	Castletownroche Grounds
	D Dalton 1-11, B Dunne 0-5, M O'Keeffe 0-1, K O'Sullivan 0-1.		D Dillon 0-9, H O'Gorman 0-3, P O'Regan 0-2, D Hannigan 0-1.

30 August 2015 Quarter-final	Ballincollig	1-17 - 4-10	Aghada	Church Road
	C Dorgan 0-8, I Coughlan 1-2, D Bowen 0-2, R Burke 0-2, D Collins 0-1, R O'Doherty 0-1, E Ryle 0-1.		J Looney 2-3, W Leahy 1-4, P O'Neill 1-0, S O'Keeffe 0-2, A Stafford 0-1.

30 August 2015 Quarter-final	Dripsey	2-17 - 1-18	Kildorrery	Kanturk Grounds
	D O'Riordan 1-5, M O'Sullivan 1-1, S Burke 0-2, M O'Riordan 0-2, P O'Riordan 0-2, C Hayes 0-2, J Carey 0-1, S Murray 0-1, K Kelleher 0-1.		P O'Brien 0-8, F Stapleton 0-4, D Kelly 1-0, A O'Brien 0-3, W Fouhy 0-1, J O'Sullivan 0-1, J McCarthy 0-1.

=== Semi-finals ===
12 September 2015 Semi-final	Aghada	2-09 - 3-09	Dripsey	Páirc Uí Rinn
	J Looney 2-1, W Leahy 0-6, A Stafford 0-2.		M O'Sullivan 2-2, D O'Riordan 0-4, D O'Sullivan 1-0, A Murray 0-1, J O'Riordan 0-1, M O'Riordan 0-1.

19 September 2015 Semi-final	Charleville	1-28 - 1-08	Fr. O'Neill's	Páirc Uí Rinn
	D Fitzgibbon 0-10, J O'Brien 0-9, A Cagney 1-2, D O'Flynn 0-3, D Casey 0-2, M Kavanagh 0-1, J Barry 0-1.		W Joyce 1-0, D Dalton 0-3, B Dunne 0-1, P Butler 0-1, C Broderick 0-1, P McMahon 0-1, K O'Sullivan 0-1.

=== Final ===
24 October 2015 Final	Charleville	5-24 - 1-10	Dripsey	Páirc Uí Rinn
	A Cagney 3-5; D Fitzgibbon 1-9 (0-2 fs, 0-1 65); A O’Connor 1-1, M Kavanagh 0-4 (0-1 f); D Flynn 0-3; J Buckley, J Barry 0-1 each.	Report	D O’Riordan 1-5 (0-5 fs); S Burke 0-2; C Hayes, M O’Riordan (f), M O’Sullivan 0-1 each.	Referee: J Larkin (Douglas)

== Championship statistics ==
=== Top scorers ===
Overall

Rank	Player	Club	Tally	Total	Matches	Average
1	Diarmuid O'Riordan	Dripsey	2-41	47	6	7.83
2	Declan Dalton	Fr. O'Neill's	2-33	39	5	7.80
3	Paddy O'Regan	Milford	1-35	38	5	7.60
4	Andrew Cagney	Charleville	6-16	34	4	8.50
5	Barry Lawton	Castlemartyr	3-21	30	3	10.00
5	Paul Finnegan	Aghabullogue	1-27	30	4	7.50
5	Cian Dorgan	Ballincollig	0-30	30	4	7.50
8	Darragh Fitzgibbon	Charleville	1-24	27	4	6.75
9	John Looney	Aghada	5-11	26	4	6.50
9	William Leahy	Aghada	1-23	26	4	6.50

In a single game

Rank	Player	Club	Tally	Total	Opposition
1	Andrew Cagney	Charleville	3-05	14	Dripsey
1	Andrew Cagney	Charleville	2-08	14	Argideen Rangers
1	Declan Dalton	Fr. O'Neill's	1-11	14	Milford
4	Dan McCarthy	Ballygarvan	2-07	13	Éire Óg
4	Maurice Sexton	Kilbrittain	1-10	13	Ballincollig
6	Jason O'Callaghan	Meelin	1-09	12	Dripsey
6	Paddy O'Regan	Milford	1-09	12	Ballygarvan
6	Darragh Fitzgibbon	Charleville	1-09	12	Dripsey
6	Diarmuid O'Riordan	Dripsey	0-12	12	Grenagh
10	Barry Lawton	Castlemartyr	1-08	11	Kildorrery
10	Barry Lawton	Castlemartyr	1-08	11	Aghabullogue
10	Declan Dalton	Fr. O'Neill's	1-08	11	Meelin
10	Johnny O'Donovan	Barryroe	0-11	11	Milford
