= 2016 Cork Intermediate Hurling Championship =

Irish hurling competition

- Dates: 21 May – 30 October 2016
- Teams: 26
- Sponsor: Evening Echo
- Champions: Fr. O'Neill's (2nd title); Adrian Kenneally (captain); Podge Butler (captain); Noel Furlong (manager)
- Runners-up: Kildorrery; Jimmy Quilty (manager)

Tournament statistics
- Matches played: 55
- Goals scored: 159 (2.89 per match)
- Points scored: 1557 (28.31 per match)
- Top scorer(s): Declan Dalton (5-55)

The 2016 Cork Intermediate Hurling Championship was the 107th staging of the Cork Intermediate Hurling Championship since its establishment by the Cork County Board in 1909. The draw for the opening rounds took place on 13 December 2015. The championship ran from 21 May to 30 October 2016.

On 30 October 2016, Fr. O'Neill's won the championship following a 1-18 to 0-14 defeat of Kildorrery in a replay of the final. This was their second championship title in the grade and their first since 2007.

Declan Dalton was the championship's top scorer with 5-55. It remains the highest score ever recorded by a player in a single championship season.

== Team changes ==
=== To Championship ===
Promoted from the City Junior A Hurling Championship

- Blackrock
- Douglas
- Glen Rovers
- Na Piarsaigh
- St. Finbarr's

Promoted from the East Cork Junior A Hurling Championship

- Dungourney
- Midleton

Promoted from the Mid Cork Junior A Hurling Championship

- Inniscarra

Promoted from the South East Junior A Hurling Championship

- Ballinhassig
- Ballymartle
- Carrigaline

=== From Championship ===
Promoted to the Cork Premier Intermediate Hurling Championship

- Charleville

== Results ==
=== Preliminary round ===
21 May 2016 Preliminary round	Ballymartle	2-16 - 2-17	Grenagh	Ballincollig
	S Cummins 0-5, K O'Callaghan 0-5, J Dwyer 1-1, G Murphy 1-0, P Geary 0-3, Gavin Murphy 0-1, A Daly 0-1.		S Bourke 0-7, P McSweeney 1-2, J Russell 1-1, U Duggan 0-3, T Kenny 0-2, S Cronin 0-1, N Doherty 0-1.

21 May 2016 Preliminary round	Barryroe	0-10 - 2-22	Dungourney	Páirc Uí Rinn
	T Harrington 0-3, K Griffin 0-2, C Hurley 0-1, D O'Sullivan 0-1, T Carroll 0-1, D O'Sullivan 0-1, J O'Donovan 0-1.		R Denny 0-8, B Ahern 1-3, S Hegarty 0-5, S Casey 1-0, J Griffin 0-2, K Kelleher 0-2, J Ronayne 0-1, K Rohan 0-1.

=== Round 1 ===
21 May 2016 Round 1	Kildorrery	2-16 - 3-10	Ballygarvan	Felix Sarsfield Memorial Park
	P O'Brien 0-9, F Stapleton 1-2, S Coughlan 1-1, D Kelly 0-2, J O'Sullivan 0-2.		M Kennefick 2-4, G White 1-2, D McCarthy 0-2, T O'Halloran 0-1, M O'Riordan 0-1.

28 May 2016 Round 1	Milford	0-13 - 1-15	Castlemartyr	Glanworth
	E Dillon 0-4, S Whelan 0-3, C O'Gorman 0-3, S O'Connell 0-1, B Murphy 0-1, H O'Gorman 0-1.		Barry Lawton 0-7, Brian Lawton 1-3, B Smiddy 0-3, C Haines 0-1, B Ó Tuama 0-1.

29 May 2016 Round 1	Ballincollig	1-08 - 2-14	Meelin	Banteer
	C Dorgan 1-5, M O'Leary 0-1, I Coughlan 0-1, D Bowen 0-1.		DJ O'Sullivan 1-1, J O'Callaghan 0-4, E Brosnan 0-4, J Forrest 1-0, S O'Sullivan 0-2, J Forrest 0-1, J Curtin 0-1, W Murphy 0-1.

29 May 2016 Round 1	Éire Óg	3-07 - 1-16	Ballinhassig	Brinny Sportsfield
	K Hallissey 3-2, C Murphy 0-2, P McDonagh 0-2, M O'Shea 0-1.		D Dineen 0-6, Diarmuid O'Sullivan 0-4, R Lombard 1-0, Declan O'Sullivan 0-2, D Duggan 0-2, P Coleman 0-1, D McCarthy 0-1.

29 May 2016 Round 1	Inniscarra	0-11 - 2-14	Aghabullogue	Blarney
	D O'Sullivan 0-5, D Hyland 0-3, A Sheehan 0-2, D O'Keeffe 0-1.		I Barry-Murphy 2-1, M Bradley 0-6, J Corkery 0-3, E O'Sullivan 0-1, B Casey 0-1, D Merrick 0-1, M O'Flynn 0-1.

3 June 2016 Round 1	Aghada	2-17 - 2-05	Blackrock	Páirc Shéamuis de Barra
	C Fleming 0-11, J Looney 2-1, K O'Hanlon 0-3, A Stafford 0-1, W Leahy 0-1.		O Kelleher 2-3, R Power 0-2.

3 June 2016 Round 1	Fr. O'Neill's	5-31 - 1-05	Carrigaline	Páirc Uí Chonaill
	D Dalton 2-13, L O'Driscoll 2-0, B Dunne 0-6, R Cullinane 1-1, E Conway 0-3, K O'Sullivan 0-3, T Millerick 0-2, P Butler 0-1, D Harrington 0-1, E Motherway 0-1.		D O'Reilly 1-0, M O'Sullivan 0-3, M Lynch 0-2.

3 June 2016 Round 1	Dripsey	0-16 - 2-11	St. Finbarr's	Ballincollig
	M O'Sullivan 0-6, D O'Riordan 0-4, D O'Sullivan 0-3, M O'Riordan 0-2, G Murphy 0-1.		R O'Mahony 1-5, M Ryan 1-2, P O'Brien 0-2, E Hill 0-1, C Greene 0-1.

4 June 2016 Round 1	Douglas	1-16 - 1-17	Dungourney	Caherlag Sportsfield
	M O'Callaghan 1-0, P Barry 0-3, D Long 0-1, J Moylan 0-1, D Curtin 0-1.		R Denny 0-8, B Ahern 1-4, S Hegarty 0-2, J Ronayne 0-1, K Rohan 0-1, S Casey 0-1.

4 June 2016 Round 1	Midleton	4-11 - 1-26	Glen Rovers	Páirc Shéamuis de Barra
	P O'Keeffe 2-2, M Abernethy 1-1, C O'Neill 0-4, B O'Sullivan 1-0, K Hurley 0-2, M O'Keeffe 0-1, M Keohane 0-1.		E O'Connell 0-12, D Brosnan 0-5, B Hackett 0-4, M Dooley 1-0, A Evans 0-2, E Cronin 0-1, C O'Brien 0-1, D Goggin 0-1.

5 June 2016 Round 1	Na Piarsaigh	0-23 - 2-20	Argideen Rangers	Brinny Sportsfield
	A Kenneally 0-11, K Forde 0-4, E Nodwell 0-3, K Waters 0-2, G Joyce 0-2, S O'Sullivan 0-1.		JM O'Callaghan 0-13, J Sheehan 1-2, B Hennessy 1-0, F Butler 0-3, M Coomey 0-1, R Milner 0-1.

11 June 2016 Round 1	Kilbrittain	1-11 - 0-11	Grenagh	Mayfield GAA Complex
	R Cashman 1-2, M Sexton 0-3, D Harrington 0-2, T Harrington 0-1, E Lyons 0-1, D Desmond 0-1, P O'Mahony 0-1.		T Kenny 0-9, DD Dorgan 0-1, J Russell 0-1.

=== Round 2A ===
19 June 2016 Round 2A	Fr. O'Neill's	1-15 - 2-09	Meelin	Kildorrery
	D Dalton 1-6, E Conway 0-3, K O'Sullivan 0-2, B Dunne 0-1, M O'Keeffe 0-1, L O'Driscoll 0-1, E Motherway 0-1.		DJ O'Sullivan 0-5, J Forrest 1-1, J O'Sullivan 1-0, J Curtin 0-1, L Collins 0-1, D O'Riordan 0-1.

26 June 2016 Round 2A	Argideen Rangers	2-14 - 1-18	Kilbrittain	Páirc Uí Ríogáin
	JM O'Callaghan 2-10, J Sheehan 0-2, F Butler 0-1, J Deasy 0-1.		R Cashman 0-7, C O'Leary 1-0, E Lyons 0-3, P O'Mahony 0-3, M Sexton 0-2, T Harrington 0-2, David Desmond 0-1.

1 July 2016 Round 2A	Kildorrery	1-14 - 1-12	Ballinhassig	Bride Rovers Park
	P O'Brien 1-7, D Kelly 0-2, W Fouhy 0-2, J O'Sullivan 0-1, F Stapleton 0-1, S O'Neill 0-1.		D Dineen 1-7, K McCarthy 0-1, D Delea 0-1, G Sheehan 0-1, D Duggan 0-1, R Lombard 0-1.

2 July 2016 Round 2A	Dungourney	1-20 - 2-16	Aghabullogue	Church Road
	R Denny 0-12, J Leahy 1-0, N Motherway 0-2, S Hegarty 0-2, B Ahern 0-2, B Ahearne 0-1, K Rogan 0-1.		M Bradley 1-15, D Merrick 1-0, R Dennehy 0-1.

3 July 2016 Round 2A	St. Finbarr's	2-13 - 2-24	Glen Rovers	Páirc Uí Rinn
	E Hill 1-2, P O'Brien 0-5, R O'Mahony 0-4, M Ryan 0-1, B hennessy 0-1.		E O'Connell 1-6, B Hackett 0-6, M Dooley 1-2, D Brosnan 0-3, A Evans 0-3, E Cronin 0-2, S Kennefick 0-2.

16 July 2016 Round 2A	Aghada	2-19 - 1-10	Castlemartyr	Killeagh Sportsfield
	W Leahy 1-4, C Fleming 0-6, P O'Neill 1-1, K O'Hanlon 0-3, M Russell 0-2, R Kennedy 0-1, E Healy 0-1, A Stafford 0-1.		Brian Lawton 1-3, B Smiddy 0-5, E Healy 0-1, A Stafford 0-1.

=== Round 2B ===
24 June 2016 Round 2B	Milford	0-17 - 2-12	Douglas	Glanworth
	P O'Regan 0-6, H O'Gorman 0-3, E Dillon 0-3, A Watson 0-2, S O'Connell 0-1, S O'Riordan 0-1, B Murphy 0-1.		A Ward 1-7, E Dolan 1-1, J Moylan 0-1, M O'Callaghan 0-1, P Barry 0-1, L Dineen 0-1.

26 June 2016 Round 2B	Ballygarvan	5-15 - 4-12	Na Piarsaigh	Páirc Uí Rinn
	M Kennefick 2-9, G White 2-4, E O'Brien 1-0, J Fenton 0-1, M O'Riordan 0-1.		S O'Sullivan 2-0, S Warren 0-5, E Nodwell 1-1, L Waters 1-1, K Forde 0-2, C O'Mahony 0-2, P Cunningham 0-1.

26 June 2016 Round 2B	Blackrock	0-16 - 0-09	Ballymartle	Páirc Liam Mhic Cárthaigh
	R Power 0-7, T Deasy 0-2, C O'Leary 0-2, O Kelleher 0-1, D Meaney 0-1, E Hickey 0-1, J O'Sullivan 0-1, A Nolan 0-1.		R Dwyer 0-5, K O'Callaghan 0-2, S Corry 0-1, P Dwyer 0-1.

2 July 2016 Round 2B	Barryroe	1-12 - 3-10	Ballincollig	Charlie Hurley Park
	T Harrington 0-8, C Hurley 1-1, J O'Donovan 0-1, K Griffin 0-1, D O'Driscoll 0-1.		I Coughlan 3-1, F Kelly 0-2, C Collins 0-2, D Brown 0-2, E Hegarty 0-1, S O'Sullivan 0-1, R Burke 0-1.

3 July 2016 Round 2B	Inniscarra	0-08 - 0-13	Midleton	Caherlag Sportsfield
	D O'Sullivan 0-4, S Dornan 0-3, A Sheehan 0-1.		C Beausang 0-8, M Keohane 0-3, P Nagle 0-1. M O'Keeffe 0-1.

16 July 2016 Round 2B	Dripsey	1-20 - 1-20 (aet)	Grenagh	Blarney
	M O'Riordan 0-9, D O'Riordan 0-7, J O'Riordan 1-0, D O'Sullivan 0-3, P O'Riordan 0-1.		T Kenny 0-10, Seán Bourke 1-3, U Duggan 0-2, P McSweeney 0-2, J Russell 0-1, S Cronin 0-1, C Kenny 0-1.

31 July 2016 Round 2B replay	Dripsey	1-11 - 1-12	Grenagh	Blarney
	M O'Riordan 0-4, M O'Sullivan 1-0, D O'Riordan 0-3, C Hayes 0-2, G Murphy 0-1, David O'Sullivan 0-1.		T Kenny 0-7, S Cronin 1-0, S Bourke 0-3, DD Dorgan 0-1, U Duggan 0-1.

6 August 2016 Round 2B	Éire Óg	2-21 - 1-04	Carrigaline	Brinny Sportsfield
	K Hallissey 1-9, K Riordan 1-4, E O'Shea 0-3, D Goulding 0-2, D O'Connor 0-1, J Cooper 0-1, J Twomey 0-1.		C Maguire 1-3, M Lynch 0-1.

=== Relegation playoffs ===
28 August 2016 Round 1	Ballymartle	1-20 - 2-10	Carrigaline	Minane Bridge

28 August 2016 Round 1	Barryroe	1-17 - 2-06	Inniscarra	Páirc Liam Mhic Cárthaigh
	T Harrington 1-8, D O'Sullivan 0-5, C Hurley 0-3, J Whelton 0-1.		D O'Sullivan 1-2, B Gould 1-0, C Bennett 0-2, D Kelleher 0-1, JJ Harrington 0-1.

18 September 2016 Round 1	Milford	0-21 - 2-10	Na Piarsaigh	Churchtown
	P O'Regan 0-8, A Watson 0-4, B Murphy 0-3, H O'Gorman 0-3, S O'Connell 0-2, E Dillon 0-1.		C O'Mahony 1-2, P Guest 1-1, E Nodwell 0-3, A Kenneally 0-2, A Bell 0-1, S O'Sullivan 0-1.

2 October 2016 Round 2	Inniscarra	0-06 - 1-22	Na Piarsaigh	Blarney
	C Bennett 0-5, T Buckley 0-1.		P Guest 0-11, K Waters 1-1, C O'Mahony 0-4, S O'Sullivan 0-4, D Spillane 0-1, E Sheehan 0-1.

8 October 2016 Round 2	Carrigaline	0-07 - 0-20	Dripsey	Páirc Liam Mhic Cárthaigh
	C O'Donovan 0-3, C Maguire 0-3, K Dwane 0-1.		D O'Riordan 0-7, M O'Riordan 0-4, Mark O'Sullivan 0-3, Dean O'Sullivan 0-2, P O'Riordan 0-2, David O'Sullivan 0-1, C Hayes 0-1.

=== Round 3 ===
29 July 2016 Round 3	Castlemartyr	2-18 - 0-16	Douglas	Páirc Lios gCúl
	Brian Lawton 0-7, C Haines 1-2, Barry Lawton 0-4, D Bowes 1-0, C Bowes 0-1, L Martin 0-1, B Smiddy 0-1, J Stack 0-1, B Ó Tuama 0-1.		E Dolan 0-9, M O'Callaghan 0-3, D O'Mahony 0-1, J Moylan 0-1, L Dineen 0-1, D Mealey 0-1.

1 August 2016 Round 3	Ballygarvan	2-12 - 2-12	St. Finbarr's	Páirc Uí Rinn
	M Kennefick 0-8, T O'Halloran 1-0, G White 1-0, D McCarthy 0-2, D O'Sullivan 0-1, C O'Sullivan 0-1.		B Ramsey 2-3, P O'Brien 0-4, J Crowley 0-2, S Callinan 0-1, I O'Callaghan 0-1, M Ryan 0-1.

1 August 2016 Round 3	Ballinhassig	3-09 - 5-09	Blackrock	Páirc Uí Rinn
	D Dineen 3-4, P O'Sullivan 0-2, D Delea 0-2, D Duggan 0-1.		C O'Leary 2-1, O Kelleher 1-3, A Nolan 2-0, L Fogarty 0-3, F Ryan 0-1, M O'Keeffe 0-1.

6 August 2016 Round 3	Meelin	4-13 - 0-22	Grenagh	Banteer
	DJ O'Sullivan 3-5, J O'Callaghan 0-5, L Collins 1-0, J Forrest 0-2, TJ Brosnan 0-1.		T Kenny 0-8, S Bourke 0-8, J Russell 0-4, U Duggan 0-1, DD Dorgan 0-1, P McSweeney 0-1.

14 August 2016 Round 3 replay	Ballygarvan	1-08 - 0-15	St. Finbarr's	Páirc Uí Rinn
	G White 1-3, M O'Callaghan 0-1, D McCarthy 0-1, D O'Sullivan 0-1, J Walsh 0-1, M O'Riordan 0-1.		B Ramsey 0-10, M Ryan 0-2, R Kelly 0-1, L O'Callaghan 0-1, C Greene 0-1.

20 August 2016 Round 3	Éire Óg	2-13 - 1-12	Aghabullogue	Cloughduv
	D Goulding 2-1, K Hallissey 0-4, P McDonagh 0-2, D O'Herlihy 0-2, K O'Riordan 0-1, C Murphy 0-1, J Cooper 0-1.		M Bradley 0-10, I Barry-Murphy 1-0, J Corkery 0-1, S O'Sullivan 0-1.

27 August 2016 Round 3	Argideen Rangers	2-11 - 1-17	Ballincollig	Charlie Hurley Park
	JM O'Callaghan 0-8, B Hennessy 1-0, F Butler 1-0, J Sheehan 0-1, M O'Callaghan 0-1, C O'Donovan 0-1.		R Bourke 1-2, D Bowen 0-3, D Collins 0-2, C Sexton 0-2, E Hegarty 0-2, I Coughlan 0-2, M O'Leary 0-1, C O'Sullivan 0-1, C Dorgan 0-1, P O'Neill 0-1.

=== Round 4 ===
14 August 2016 Round 4	Blackrock	1-13 - 2-19	Meelin	Mourne Abbey
	J O'Sullivan 0-4, D Cremin 1-0, O Kelleher 0-2, R Power 0-2, C O'Leary 0-2, G Connolly 0-1, L Fogarty 0-1, C Kilcoyne 0-1.		DJ O'Sullivan 0-11, J O'Callaghan 1-1, TJ Brosnan 1-1, John Forrest 0-1, James Forrest 0-1, SM O'Sullivan 0-1, W Murphy 0-1, L Collins 0-1, B O'Sullivan 0-1.

21 August 2016 Round 4	Aghada	4-13 - 3-12	St. Finbarr's	Páirc Uí Rinn
	J Looney 1-5, K O'Callaghan 1-2, W Leahy 1-2, P O'Neill 1-0, A Stafford 0-2, C Fleming 0-2.		B Ramsey 2-2, C Nagle 0-5, C Greene 1-0, S Callinan 0-3, J Crowley 0-2.

21 August 2016 Round 4	Castlemartyr	0-11 - 0-20	Fr. O'Neill's	Cloyne
	Barry Lawton 0-7, J Stack 0-1, C Martin 0-1, R O'Donovan 0-1, A Bowen 0-1.		D Dalton 0-10, B Dunne 0-5, L O'Driscoll 0-2, E Conway 0-2, P Butler 0-1.

26 August 2016 Round 4	Éire Óg	1-22 - 1-13	Midleton	Páirc Uí Rinn
	K Hallissey 0-8, E O'Shea 0-5, D Goulding 1-0, D O'Connor 0-2, C Murphy 0-2, D O'Herlihy 0-2, K Riordan 0-2, P McDonagh 0-1.		C Beausang 0-10, P Nagle 1-0, S Ryan 0-2, S O'Farrell 0-1.

3 September 2016 Round 4	Dungourney	0-12 - 1-09	Ballincollig	Páirc Uí Rinn
	R Denny 0-8, N Motherway 0-1, S Hegarty 0-1, M Hennessy 0-1, S Casey 0-1.		D Bowen 1-3, I Coughlan 0-3, C Sexton 0-2, E Hegarty 0-1.

24 September 2016 Round 4 replay	Dungourney	1-18 - 4-06	Ballincollig	Roverstown Sportsfield
	R Denny 0-6, S Hegarty 0-6, S Casey 1-1, P Aherne 0-1, B Aherne 0-1, M Hennessy 0-1, K Kelleher 0-1, P Harney 0-1.		R Bourke 2-0, D Bowen 0-5, I Coughlan 1-0, C O'Donovan 1-0, S O'Sullivan 0-1.

=== Quarter-final ===
28 August 2016 Quarter-final	Glen Rovers	2-13 - 2-13	Kilbrittain	Riverstick
	E O'Connell 0-6, A Evans 1-2, C O'Brien 1-1, J Horgan 0-1, K McCarthy 0-1, D Brown 0-1, R McGuckian 0-1.		E Lyons 0-8, R Cashman 1-2, C O'Donovan 1-0, David Desmond 0-1, D Harrington 0-1, C Hickey 0-1.

11 September 2016 Quarter-final replay	Glen Rovers	1-13 - 0-13	Kilbrittain	Riverstick
	E O'Connell 0-8, P White 1-0, A Evans 0-2, C O'Brien 0-1, J Horgan 0-1, D Goggin 0-1.		R Cashman 0-9, D Harrington 0-1, E Lyons 0-1, T Harrington 0-1, P O'Mahony 0-1.

17 September 2016 Quarter-final	Aghada	3-17 - 1-11	Meelin	Mourne Abbey
	J Looney 1-9, C Fleming 1-2, P O'Neill 1-1, W Leahy 0-2, K O'Hanlon 0-1, E Healy 0-1, A Stafford 0-1.		J Forrest 1-1, DJ O'Sullivan 0-3, J O'Callaghan 0-3, L Collins 0-2, SM O'Sullivan 0-1, W Murphy 0-1.

24 September 2016 Quarter-final	Éire Óg	1-12 - 1-18	Kildorrery	Bride Rovers Park
	K Hallissey 1-4, D Goulding 0-3, P McDonagh 0-3, E O'Shea 0-1, J Dineen 0-1.		P O'Brien 0-11, S O'Neill 1-1, D Kelly 0-2, W Fouhy 0-1, J Gorman 0-1, F Stapleton 0-1, J O'Sullivan 0-1.

8 October 2016 Quarter-final	Dungourney	3-11 - 2-15	Fr. O'Neill's	Killeagh Sportsfield
	R Denny 1-5, B Ahern 1-0, S Casey 1-0, S Hegarty 0-3, J Griffin 0-2, J McCarthy 0-1.		D Dalton 1-5, B Dunne 0-5, E Conway 1-0, K O'Sullivan 0-2, G O'Leary 0-1, L O'Driscoll 0-1, P McMahon 0-1.

=== Semi-finals ===
1 October 2016 Semi-final	Glen Rovers	2-18 - 3-19	Kildorrery	Castletownroche
	E O'Connell 0-14, A Evans 1-0, C O'Brien 1-0, D Brown 0-1, S Milner 0-1, D Moylan 0-1, R Virgo 0-1.		P O'Brien 1-10, D Kelly 1-3, S O'Neill 1-0, F Stapleton 0-3, A O'Brien 0-2, J O'Sullivan 0-1.

16 October 2016 Semi-final	Fr. O'Neill's	0-13 - 0-11	Aghada	Magner's Hill
	D Dalton 0-7, B Dunne 0-2, T Millerick 0-2, P McMahon 0-1, L O'Driscoll 0-1.		C Fleming 0-3, J Looney 0-2, P O'Neill 0-1, E Healy 0-1, S O'Keeffe 0-1, K O'Hanlon 0-1, W Leahy 0-1, A Stafford 0-1.

=== Final ===
22 October 2016 Final	Fr. O'Neill's	0-16 - 1-13	Kildorrery	Páirc Uí Rinn
	D Dalton 0-6, E Conway 0-2, E Motherway 0-2, B Dunne 0-2, T Millerick 0-1, P McMahon 0-1, M O'Keeffe 0-1, J Millerick 0-1.		P O'Brien 0-8, J O'Sullivan 1-0, A O'Brien 0-3, D Kelly 0-2.

30 October 2016 Final replay	Fr. O'Neill's	1-18 - 1-14	Kildorrery	Páirc Uí Rinn
	D Dalton 1-8 (1-5f, 0-2 sideline), E Conway 0-3, T Millerick 0-2, P Butler 0-2, L O'Driscoll 0-1; B Dunne 0-1, E Motherway 0-1.	Report	P O'Brien 0-10 (8f), S O'Neill 1-0, F Stapleton 0-2; W Fuohy 0-1, D Kelly 0-1.	Referee: N Wall (Carrigaline)

== Championship statistics ==
=== Top scorers ===
Overall

Rank	Player	Club	Tally	Total	Matches	Average
1	Declan Dalton	Fr. O'Neill's	5-55	70	7	10.00
2	Peter O'Brien	Kildorrery	2-55	61	6	10.16
3	Ryan Denny	Dungourney	1-47	50	6	8.33
4	Evan O'Connell	Glen Rovers	1-46	49	5	9.80
5	Kevin Hallissey	Éire Óg	5-27	42	5	8.40
6	D. J. O'Sullivan	Meelin	4-25	37	3	12.33
6	J. M. O'Callaghan	Argideen Rangers	2-31	37	3	12.33
8	Tom Kenny	Grenagh	0-36	36	5	7.20
9	Matthew Bradley	Aghabullogue	1-31	34	3	11.33
10	Mark Kennefick	Ballygarvan	4-21	33	3	11.00

In a single game

Rank	Player	Club	Tally	Total	Opposition
1	Declan Dalton	Fr. O'Neill's	2-13	19	Carrigaline
2	Matthew Bradley	Aghabullogue	1-15	18	Dungourney
3	J. M. O'Callaghan	Argideen Rangers	2-10	16	Kilbrittain
4	Mark Kennefick	Ballygarvan	2-09	15	Na Piarsaigh
5	D. J. O'Sullivan	Meelin	3-05	14	Grenagh
5	Evan O'Connell	Glen Rovers	0-14	14	Kildorrery
7	Darren Dineen	Ballinhassig	3-04	13	Blackrock
7	Peter O'Brien	Kildorrery	1-10	13	Glen Rovers
7	J. M. O'Callaghan	Argideen Rangers	0-13	13	Na Piarsaigh
10	Kevin Hallissey	Éire Óg	1-09	12	Carrigaline
10	John Looney	Aghada	1-09	12	Meelin
10	Evan O'Connell	Glen Rovers	0-12	12	Midleton
10	Ryan Denny	Dungourney	0-12	12	Aghabullogue
