= Declan Dalton =

Irish hurler (born 1997)

Personal information
- Native name: Déaglán Daltúin (Irish)
- Nickname: Deccie
- Born: 6 November 1997 (age 28) Ballymacoda, County Cork, Ireland
- Occupation: Electrician
- Height: 6 ft 2 in (188 cm)

Sport
- Sport: Hurling
- Position: Left wing-forward
Clubs*
Years	Club	Apps (scores)
2014-present 2015-2019	Fr. O'Neill's → Imokilly	53 (39-410); 23 (5-92)
Club titles
- Cork titles: 3
Inter-county**
Years	County	Apps (scores)
2016-2026	Cork	22 (4-48)
Inter-county titles
- Munster titles: 1
- All-Irelands: 0
- NHL: 1
- All Stars: 0
- * club appearances and scores correct as of 20:55, 10 July 2025. **Inter County team apps and scores correct as of 20:55, 10 July 2025.

Declan Dalton (born 6 November 1997) is an Irish hurler who plays as a forward for club side Fr. O'Neill's, divisional side Imokilly and at inter-county level with the Cork senior hurling team.

== Early life ==
Born and raised in Ballymacoda, County Cork, Dalton first played hurling to a high standard as a student at Pobalscoil na Tríonóide in Youghal. He progressed through the various age grades before joining the school's senior team. Dalton was the top scorer during their Dr Harty Cup campaign in 2014–15.

== Club career ==
Dalton joined the Fr. O'Neill's club at a young age and played in all grades at juvenile and underage levels. On 16 September 2013, he was at right wing-forward when Fr. O'Neill's defeated Newcestown by 4–14 to 5–10 to win the Cork Premier 2 MHC title.

Dalton subsequently progressed onto the Fr. O'Neill's under-21 team. On 8 December 2018, he gave the "performance of a lifetime" for Fr. O'Neill's when he scored 0–15, including twelve from frees, in 3–24 to 4–18 defeat of Midleton to win the Cork Premier Under-21 Championship title.

Dalton made his first appearance for the Fr. O'Neill's top adult team during the 2014 Cork Intermediate Championship.

On 22 October 2016, Dalton scored six points from full-forward when Fr. O'Neill's drew with Kildorrery in the Cork Intermediate Championship final. The replay a week later also saw Dalton top score for the team with 1–08 in a 1–18 to 1–14 victory.

On 12 October 2019, Dalton lined out at full-forward when Fr. O'Neill's faced Kilworth in the Cork Premier Intermediate Championship final. He ended the game with a winners' medal following the 3–23 to 1–20 victory. Dalton was also the championship's top scorer with 3-45. On 24 November 2019, he scored 1-07 when Fr. O'Neill's defeated Ballysaggart by 2–15 to 0–17 to win the Munster Club Championship.

== Divisional career ==
Dalton's performances at club level lead to him being selected for the Imokilly divisional team during the 2015 Cork Senior Championship.

On 22 October 2017, Dalton was in goal when Imokilly defeated Blackrock by 3–13 to 0–18 to win the Cork Senior Championship final. It was the division's first title since 1998.

Dalton was replaced in goal by Watergrasshill's Dara O'Callaghan for the 2018 Cork Senior Championship, however, he remained on the panel as a forward. On 14 October, he was introduced as a 52nd-minute substitute for Barry Lawton when Imokilly retained the title after a 4–19 to 1–18 defeat of Midleton in the final.

On 20 October 2019, Dalton played in a third successive county final. Lining out at full-forward, he top scored for the team with 1-07 and collected a third successive winners' medal after the 2–17 to 1–16 defeat of Glen Rovers. Dalton was also the championship's top scorer with 3-55.

== Inter-county career ==
Dalton first played for Cork at minor level on 8 April 2015 in a 2–20 to 1-13 Munster Championship defeat of Limerick. An anomaly in the championship format saw Cork face the same opposition in the semi-final, with Limerick reversing the result and knocking Dalton's team out of the championship.

On 13 July 2017, Dalton made his first appearance for the Cork under-21 hurling team, scoring 1–12, including a late penalty, in Cork's one-point defeat of Waterford.

Dalton won a Munster Championship medal on 4 July 2018, after scoring seven points in Cork's 2–23 to 1–13 defeat of Tipperary in the final. A knee injury in the subsequent All-Ireland semi-final defeat of Wexford threatened to end his championship campaign. On 26 August 2018, Dalton scored five points from frees in a 3–13 to 1-16 All-Ireland final defeat by Tipperary in what was his last game in the grade. Dalton was later nominated for the Team of the Year.

Dalton was added to the extended training panel of the Cork senior team in late 2016. He made his first competitive appearance as goalkeeper on 25 January 2017 and scored two long-range points from frees in Cork's 0–19 to 0-15 Munster League defeat of Clare.

On 27 January 2019, Dalton made his first National Hurling League appearance at centre-forward in a 2–18 to 0–17 defeat by Kilkenny at Nowlan Park. On 13 February, it was announced that he faced a period on the sidelines following a knee operation.

== Career statistics ==
=== Club ===
As of 20 September 2026

Team	Year	Cork IHC		Munster		All-Ireland		Total	
Team	Year	Apps	Score	Apps	Score	Apps	Score	Apps	Score
Fr. O'Neill's	2014	4	1-21	—		—		4	1-21
Fr. O'Neill's	2015	4	3-33	—		—		4	3-33
Fr. O'Neill's	2016	7	5-55	—		—		7	5-55
Fr. O'Neill's	Total	15	9-109	—		—		15	9-109
Fr. O'Neill's	Year	Cork PIHC		Munster		All-Ireland		Total	
Fr. O'Neill's	Year	Apps	Score	Apps	Score	Apps	Score	Apps	Score
Fr. O'Neill's	2017	4	3-14	—		—		4	3-14
Fr. O'Neill's	2018	4	3-19	—		—		4	3-19
Fr. O'Neill's	2019	5	3-45	3	3-28	2	2-14	10	8-87
Fr. O'Neill's	Total	13	9-78	3	3-28	2	2-14	18	14-120
Fr. O'Neill's	Year	Cork SAHC		Munster		All-Ireland		Total	
Fr. O'Neill's	Year	Apps	Score	Apps	Score	Apps	Score	Apps	Score
Fr. O'Neill's	2020	5	7-35	—		—		5	7-35
Fr. O'Neill's	2021	3	3-30	—		—		3	3-30
Fr. O'Neill's	2022	5	1-50	—		—		5	1-50
Fr. O'Neill's	Total	13	11-115	—		—		13	11-115
Fr. O'Neill's	Year	Cork PSHC		Munster		All-Ireland		Total	
Fr. O'Neill's	Year	Apps	Score	Apps	Score	Apps	Score	Apps	Score
Fr. O'Neill's	2023	3	2-24	—		—		3	2-24
Fr. O'Neill's	2024	4	3-42	—		—		4	3-42
Fr. O'Neill's	2025	3	1-28	—		—		3	1-28
Fr. O'Neill's	2026	4	1-30	—		—		4	1-30
Fr. O'Neill's	Total	14	7-124	—		—		14	7-124
Career total		55	36-426	3	3-28	2	2-14	60	41-468

=== Division ===
As of match played 20 October 2019.

Team	Year	Cork SHC	
Team	Year	Apps	Score
Imokilly	2015	3	1-10
Imokilly	2016	4	0-08
Imokilly	2017	6	1-08
Imokilly	2018	4	0-11
Imokilly	2019	6	3-55
Career total		23	5-92

=== Inter-county ===
As of 21 March 2026

Team	Year	National League			Munster		All-Ireland		Total	
Team	Year	Division	Apps	Score	Apps	Score	Apps	Score	Apps	Score
Cork Minor	2015	—			2	0-03	—		2	0-03
Cork Minor	Total	—			2	0-03	—		2	0-03
Cork U21	2017	—			2	1-14	—		2	1-14
Cork U21	2018	—			2	0-15	2	0-13	4	0-28
Cork U21	Total	—			4	1-29	2	0-13	6	1-42
Cork	2017	Division 1A	—		—		—		—	
Cork	2018	Division 1A	—		—		—		—	
Cork	2019	Division 1A	2	0-01	3	0-02	1	0-01	6	0-04
Cork	2020	Division 1A	3	0-02	1	0-01	2	1-02	6	1-05
Cork	2021	Division 1A	2	0-02	0	0-00	0	0-00	2	0-02
Cork	2022	Division 1A	—		—		—		—	
Cork	2023	Division 1A	4	1-12	4	2-09	—		8	3-21
Cork	2024	Division 1A	2	0-07	3	0-07	4	0-14	9	0-28
Cork	2025	Division 1A	5	3-13	3	1-07	2	0-06	10	4-26
Cork	2026	Division 1A	5	1-06	0	0-00	0	0-00	5	1-06
Cork	Total		23	5-43	14	3-26	9	1-23	46	9-92
Career total			23	5-43	20	4-58	11	1-36	54	10-137

== Honours ==
Fr. O'Neill's

- Cork Senior A Hurling Championship: 2022
- Munster Intermediate Club Hurling Championship: 2019
- Cork Premier Intermediate Hurling Championship: 2019
- Cork Intermediate Hurling Championship: 2016
- Cork Premier Under-21 A Hurling Championship: 2018
- Rebel Óg Premier 2 Minor Hurling Championship: 2013

Imokilly

- Cork Senior Hurling Championship: 2017, 2018, 2019

Cork

- Munster Senior Hurling Championship: 2025
- National Hurling League: 2025
- Munster Under-21 Hurling Championship: 2018
