= 1948 Cork Intermediate Hurling Championship =

Irish hurling competition

- Dates: 4 April – 26 September 1948
- Teams: 9
- Champions: Midleton (1st title)
- Runners-up: Shanballymore

Tournament statistics
- Matches played: 8
- Goals scored: 64 (8 per match)
- Points scored: 73 (9.13 per match)

The 1948 Cork Intermediate Hurling Championship was the 39th staging of the Cork Intermediate Hurling Championship since its establishment by the Cork County Board in 1909. The draw for the first round fixtures took place on 25 January 1948. The championship ran from 4 April to 26 September 1948.

The final was played on 26 September 1948 at Fermoy Sportsfield, between Midleton and Shanballymore, in what was their first ever meeting in the final. Midleton won the match by 6–04 to 1–01 to claim their first ever championship title.

== Results ==
=== First round ===
4 April 1948 First round	Shanballymore	6-07 - 2-03	Shamrocks	Douglas Grounds

4 April 1948 First round	Blackrock	6-01 - 4-04	Newtownshandrum	Mallow Grounds

2 May 1948 First round	Bandon	1-03 - 9-01	Oldcastletown	Douglas Grounds

9 May 1948 First round	Midleton	3-09 - 2-02	Ballincollig	Riverstown Sportsfield

- Buttevant received a bye in this round.

=== Second round ===
4 July 1948 Second round	Buttevant	4-05 - 6-05	Midleton	Fermoy Grounds

- Blackrock, Oldcastletown and Shanballymore received a bye in this round.

=== Semi-finals ===
11 July 1948 Semi-final	Shanballymore	4-05 - 3-07	Oldcastletown	Rathluirc Grounds

15 August 1948 Semi-final	Blackrock	2-04 - 1-12	Midleton	Riverstown Sportsfield

=== Final ===
26 September 1948 Final	Midleton	6-04 - 1-01	Shanballymore	Fermoy Sportsfield
