= 2015 Cork Premier Intermediate Football Championship =

- Dates: 1 May 2015 – 18 October 2015
- Teams: 16
- Sponsor: Evening Echo
- Champions: Carrigaline (1st title); Barry O'Keeffe (captain); Michael Meaney (manager)
- Runners-up: St Michael's; Eric Hegarty (captain)

Tournament statistics
- Matches played: 30
- Top scorer(s): Daniel Goulding (1-34)

The 2015 Cork Premier Intermediate Football Championship was the 10th staging of the Cork Premier Intermediate Football Championship since its establishment by the Cork County Board in 2006. The championship began on 1 May 2015 and ended on 18 October 2015.

On 18 October 2015, Carrigaline won the championship following a 0-12 to 0-11 defeat of St Michael's in the final at Páirc Uí Rinn. It was their first ever championship title.

Éire Óg's Daniel Goulding was the championship's top scorer with 1-34.

== Team changes ==
=== To Championship ===
Promoted from the Cork Intermediate Football Championship

- Éire Óg

Relegated from the Cork Senior Football Championship

- St. Vincent's

=== From Championship ===
Promoted to the Cork Senior Football Championship

- Valley Rovers

Relegated to the Cork Intermediate Football Championship

- Glenville

== Results ==
=== Round 1 ===
1 May 2015 Round 1	Bantry Blues	2-06 - 3-10	Éire Óg	Ballingeary
	S Drummey 1-1, A Coakley 1-1, R Deane 0-2, S Coughlan 0-2.		D Goulding 1-8, L Sheehan 1-0, R O'Toole 1-0, D O'Connor 0-1, J Dineen 0-1.

1 May 2015 Round 1	St. Vincent's	1-09 - 0-08	Na Piarsaigh	Tank Field
	JP Murphy 0-5, C Barry 1-0, D Duggan 0-1, G Kelleher 0-1, A Buckley 0-1, D O'Regan 0-1.		K Buckley 0-5, J Gardiner 0-2, P O'Rourke 0-1.

2 May 2015 Round 1	Ballinora	0-04 - 1-12	Mallow	Blarney
	M Murphy 0-2, B Ahern 0-1, D Dineen 0-1.		C O'Riordan 0-4, K O'Sullivan 1-0, R Harkin 0-3, A Sheehan 0-2, J Loughrey 0-1, C Stanton 0-1, P Herlihy 0-1.

2 May 2015 Round 1	Castletownbere	0-07 - 0-09	Carrigaline	Castletown-Kinneigh
	A O'Sullivan 0-2, G Murphy 0-2, D Murphy 0-2, D Fenton 0-1.		D Drake 0-4, B Coakley 0-2, E Ryan 0-1, Kevin Kavanagh 0-1, K McIntyre 0-1.

2 May 2015 Round 1	Naomh Abán	1-12 - 1-08	Grenagh	Coachford Sportsfield
	M Ó Cróinín 1-3, C Ó Murchú 0-2, M Ó Liatháin 0-2, N Ó Ceallaigh 0-2, M Ó Laoire 0-1, S Ó Laoire 0-1, M Ó Duinnín 0-1.		U Duggan 1-0, D Dorgan 0-4, G Russell 0-2, T Walsh 0-1, C Fitzgerald 0-1.

4 May 2016 Round 1	Nemo Rangers	1-07 - 1-11	St. Michael's	Páirc Uí Rinn
	C O'Donovan 1-0, J Kerins 0-3, K Weldon 0-2, A Morgan 0-1, M Dorgan 0-1.		E Hegarty 1-1, M Drummond 0-4, P Cronin 0-3, K Hegarty 0-2, A Murphy 0-1.

9 May 2015 Round 1	Béal Átha'n Ghaorthaidh	0-15 - 1-10	Macroom	Cill na Martra
	A Ó Coinceannáin 0-4, P Ó Buachalla 0-3, B Seartan 0-3, L Seartan 0-2, T Ó Laoire 0-2, C Ó Tuama 0-1.		C O'Sullivan 1-1, F Goold 0-3, D Goold 0-2, G Angland 0-1, J Murphy 0-1, P Corrigan 0-1, C Murphy 0-1.

10 May 2015 Round 1	Newmarket	1-09 - 2-07	Kiskeam	Patsy O'Sullivan Memorial Park
	B O'Connor 1-2, C O'Keeffe 0-4, J Ryan 0-1, D O'Keeffe 0-1, TJ Brodie 0-1.		D Scannell 1-1, D Fitzgerald 1-0, S O'Sullivan 0-2, T O'Sullivan 0-2, B Dennehy 0-1, R Carroll 0-1.

=== Round 2 ===
30 May 2015 Round 2	Bantry Blues	2-08 - 0-06	Na Piarsaigh	St. Mary's Park
	S McCarthy 1-1, S Coughlan 1-0, S O'Leary 0-2, S O'Neill 0-2, A Coakley 0-1, R Deane 0-1, N Canty 0-1.		S Warren 0-4, A Keating 0-2.

30 May 2015 Round 2	Nemo Rangers	1-09 - 1-10 (aet)	Macroom	Carrigadrohid
	M Dorgan 1-0, C Horgan 0-3, S Martin 0-2, R Kennedy 0-2, J Donovan 0-1, C O'Donovan 0-1.		D Goold 1-4, T Dineen 0-2, P Corrigan 0-1, E O'Mahony 0-1, K Murphy 0-1, O Murphy 0-1.

6 June 2015 Round 2	Castletownbere	2-13 - 3-09	Ballinora	Ballingeary
	D Fenton 1-2, D Murphy 1-1, G Murphy 0-4, A O'Sullivan 0-3, L Harrington 0-1, D Dunne 0-1, J Walsh 0-1.		M Murphy 1-4, D Dineen 2-0, C Murphy 0-2, B Ahern 0-1, C Brosnan 0-1, C O'Shea 0-1.

6 June 2015 Round 2	Grenagh	0-10 - 2-14	Newmarket	Castlemagner
	DD Dorgan 0-8, G Russell 0-1, U Duggan 0-1.		C O'Keeffe 2-4, D Culloty 0-3, D O'Keeffe 0-2, J Lane 0-2, J Ryan 0-1, B Daly 0-1, T O'Keeffe 0-1.

=== Round 3 ===
21 June 2015 Round 3	Grenagh	0-16 - 2-06	Ballinora	Páirc Eoin Mhic Charthaigh
	DD Dorgan 0-9, U Duggan 0-2, J Russell 0-2, N Doherty 0-1, T Walsh 0-1, G Russell 0-1.		B Ahern 0-5, D Dineen 1-0, 1-0, C Murphy 1-0, D O'Neill 0-1.

26 June 2015 Round 3	Na Piarsaigh	3-06 - 2-14	Nemo Rangers	Mayfield
	S Warren 1-1, J Gardiner 1-1, T Ó hAilpín 1-0, C O'Mahony 0-2, A Hogan 0-1, K Buckley 0-1.		J Donovan 1-2, C O'Donovan 0-5, E McCarthy 1-0, C Horgan 0-4, R Kennedy 0-2, S Martin 0-1.

=== Relegation playoff ===
25 September 2015 Playoff	Ballinora	0-08 - 2-11	Na Piarsaigh	Páirc Uí Rinn
	C O'Shea 0-3, B Ahern 0-2, C Brosnan 0-1, M Murphy 0-1, D Holmes 0-1.		A Hogan 1-2, A Keating 1-0, S Warren 0-2, C O'Mahony 0-2, S Glasgow 0-2, T Ó hAilpín 0-1, S O'Sullivan 0-1, P Murphy 0-1.

=== Round 4 ===
19 July 2015 Round 4	Nemo Rangers	0-09 - 3-13	Kiskeam	Castle Grounds
	C Horgan 0-3, K Weldon 0-2, R Kennedy 0-2, C Allen 0-1, G Irwin 0-1.		D Scannell 1-7, G Casey 1-0, R Carroll 1-0, M Herlihy 0-2, S Linehan 0-2, M Casey 0-1, T O'Sullivan 0-1.

19 July 2015 Round 4	Naomh Abán	2-06 - 3-12	Castletownbere	Wolfe Tone Park
	M Ó Cróinín 1-4, M Ó Laoire 1-0, N Ó Ceallaigh 0-1, D Ó Cróinín 0-1.		G Murphy 0-8, J Walsh 2-0, D Murphy 1-0, A O'Sullivan 0-2, L Hanley 0-1, G Healy 0-1.

1 August 2015 Round 4	St. Michael's	1-11 - 1-10	Mallow	Blarney
	P Cronin 0-6, S O’Keeffe 1-0, M Mulconroy 0-2, E Hegarty 0-2, K Hegarty 0-1.		C O'Riordan 1-8, M O'Rourke 0-1, K O'Connor 0-1.

2 August 2015 Round 4	Macroom	4-08 - 2-11	Newmarket	Dromtarriffe
	C Murphy 2-0, F Goold 1-3, D Goold 1-1, T Dineen 0-1, C O'Sullivan 0-1, S Kiely 0-1, D Horgan 0-1.		C O'Keeffe 1-5, B O'Connor 1-0, D Culloty 0-3, J Lane 0-1, M Cottrell 0-1, K O'Sullivan 0-1.

8 August 2015 Round 4	Béal Átha'n Ghaorthaidh	3-08 - 0-10	Bantry Blues	Kealkill
	A Ó Coinceannáin 1-6, T Ó Laoire 1-1, B Seartan 1-0, L Seartan 0-1.		R Deane 0-5, S Coughlan 0-2, S O'Neill 0-1, G Canty 0-1, S Drummey 0-1.

15 August 2015 Round 4	Éire Óg	2-10 - 0-11	Grenagh	Ballyanley
	D Goulding 0-7, D Murphy 1-0, A O'Connor 1-0, J Dineen 0-2, K Hallissey 0-1.		DD Dorgan 0-4, T Walsh 0-3, L Walsh 0-2, C Fitzgerald 0-1, G Russell 0-1.

=== Quarter-finals ===
15 August 2015 Quarter-final	Carrigaline	1-10 - 0-08	St. Vincent's	Páirc Liam Mhic Cárthaigh
	B Coakley 1-5, D Drake 0-3, S O'Brien 0-1, E Kavanagh 0-1.		D Duggan 0-4, D O'Connor 0-1, A Buckley 0-1, S Duggan 0-1, G Kelleher 0-1.

29 August 2015 Quarter-final	Macroom	2-12 - 1-16	Éire Óg	Coachford Sportsfield
	D Horgan 1-1, F Goold 0-4, C O'Sullivan 1-0, K Murphy 0-3, T Dineen 0-2, D Goold 0-1, R Buckley 0-1.		D Goulding 0-5, K Hallissey 0-4, D O'Connor 1-0, J Dineen 0-3, D Murphy 0-2, L Sheehan 0-2.

30 August 2015 Quarter-final	Castletownbere	2-11 - 0-11	Béal Átha'n Ghaorthaidh	Kealkill
	A O'Sullivan 1-2, D Bán O'Sullivan 1-0, D Murphy 0-3, D Dunne 0-2, L Hanley 0-1, G Murphy 0-1, D Wiseman 0-1, J Walsh 0-1.		L Seartan 0-4, A Ó Coinceannáin 0-3, B Seartan 0-1, C Ó Tuama 0-1, T Ó Laoire 0-1, M Ó Tuama 0-1.

30 August 2015 Quarter-final	Kiskeam	3-07 - 1-13	St. Michael's	Páirc Eoin Mhic Charthaigh
	G Casey 1-1, D Scannell 1-0, D Fitzgerald 1-0, M Herlihy 0-3, B Dennehy 0-2, T O'Sullivan 0-1.		P Cronin 1-5, E Buckley 0-2, E Hegarty 0-2, M Mulconroy 0-1, D Meaney 0-1, K Hegarty 0-1, S O'Keeffe 0-1.

19 September 2015 Quarter-final replay	Kiskeam	1-08 - 1-13	St. Michael's	Páirc Eoin Mhic Charthaigh
	M Herlihy 1-2, B Dennehy 0-2, S O'Sullivan 0-1, T O'Sullivan 0-1, T Dennehy 0-1, G Casey 0-1.		E Hegarty 0-4, M Drummond 1-0, E Buckley 0-3, M Mulconroy 0-3, P Cronin 0-3.

=== Semi-finals ===
13 September 2015 Semi-final	Carrigaline	1-06 - 0-09	Éire Óg	Brinny Sportsfield
	B Pope 1-0, D Drake 0-3, B Coakley 0-1, N Murphy 0-1, E Kavanagh 0-1.		D Goulding 0-4, J Dineen 0-2, M O'Shea 0-1, L Sheehan 0-1, D Murphy 0-1.

26 September 2015 Semi-final replay	Carrigaline	2-12 - 0-16	Éire Óg	Brinny Sportsfield
	B Coakley 0-6, D Drake 0-5, M Reilly 1-0, N Murphy 1-0, B O'Keeffe 0-1.		D Goulding 0-10, L Sheehan 0-3, D O'Connor 0-1, J Dineen 0-1, D O'Herlihy 0-1.

27 September 2015 Semi-final	St. Michael's	0-13 - 0-06	Castletownbere	Sam Maguire Park
	P Cronin 0-6, E Buckley 0-2, K Hegarty 0-2, M Mulconroy 0-2, T Deasy 0-1.		G Murphy 0-2, L Harrington 0-2, D Fenton 0-1, Dean Murphy 0-1.

=== Final ===
18 October 2015 Final	Carrigaline	0-12 - 0-11	St Michael's	Páirc Uí Rinn
	D Drake 0-3, B Coakley 0-3 (two frees) each, N Murphy, K Kavanagh, B O’Keeffe, B Pope, S Griffin, S O’Brien 0-1 each.	Report	P Cronin 0-6 (frees), M Mulconroy 0-2, E Hegarty (free), A Nolan, S O’Keeffe, E Hegarty (free) 0-1 each.	Referee: D O'Leary (Kiskeam)

== Championship statistics ==
=== Top scorers ===
Overall

Rank	Player	Club	Tally	Total	Matches	Average
1	Daniel Goulding	Éire Óg	1-34	37	5	11.16
2	Paul Cronin	St. Michael's	1-29	32	6	5.33
3	D. D. Dorgan	Grenagh	0-25	25	4	6.25
4	Conor O'Keeffe	Newmarket	3-13	22	3	7.33
5	Brian Coakley	Carrigaline	1-17	20	5	4.00
6	David Drake	Carrigaline	0-18	18	5	3.60
7	David Scannell	Kiskeam	3-08	17	3	5.66
7	Gary Murphy	Castletownbere	0-17	17	5	3.60
8	Aindreas Ó Coinceannáin	Béal Átha'n Ghaorthaidh	1-13	16	3	5.33
9	Cian O'Riordan	Mallow	1-12	15	2	7.50

In a single game

Rank	Player	Club	Tally	Total	Opposition
1	Daniel Goulding	Éire Óg	1-08	11	Bantry Blues
1	Cian O'Riordan	Mallow	1-08	11	St. Michael's
2	Conor O'Keeffe	Newmarket	2-04	10	Grenagh
2	David Scannell	Kiskeam	1-07	10	Nemo Rangers
2	Daniel Goulding	Éire Óg	0-10	10	Carrigaline
3	Aindreas Ó Coinceannáin	Béal Átha'n Ghaorthaidh	1-06	9	Bantry Blues
3	D. D. Dorgan	Grenagh	0-09	9	Ballinora
4	Conor O'Keeffe	Newmarket	1-05	8	Macroom
4	Brian Coakley	Carrigaline	1-05	8	St. Vincent's
4	Paul Cronin	St. Michael's	1-05	8	Kiskeam
4	Gary Murphy	Castletownbere	0-08	8	Naomh Abán
4	D. D. Dorgan	Grenagh	0-08	8	Newmarket
