= 1914 Cork Intermediate Hurling Championship =

Irish hurling competition

- Champions: Charleville (1st title)
- Runners-up: Shamrocks

The 1914 Cork Intermediate Hurling Championship was the sixth staging of the Cork Intermediate Hurling Championship since its establishment by the Cork County Board.

Charleville won the championship following a walkover defeat of Shamrocks in the final.

== Results ==
Final

Final	Charleville	w/o - scr.	Shamrocks
