= 1978 Cork Intermediate Hurling Championship =

Irish hurling competition

- Dates: 7 May - 13 August 1978
- Teams: 15
- Champions: Midleton (3rd title); John Fenton (captain)
- Runners-up: Newtownshandrum; Simon Morrissey (captain)

Tournament statistics
- Matches played: 14
- Goals scored: 67 (4.79 per match)
- Points scored: 256 (18.29 per match)
- Top scorer(s): John Fenton (1-18)

The 1978 Cork Intermediate Hurling Championship was the 69th staging of the Cork Intermediate Hurling Championship since its establishment by the Cork County Board in 1909. The draw for the opening round fixtures took place at the Cork Convention on 5 February 1978. The championship ran from 7 May to 13 August 1978.

Ballinhassig were the defending champions, however, they were beaten by Newtownshandrum in the quarter-finals.

The final was played on 11 August 1978 at Páirc Mhic Gearailt in Fermoy, between Midleton and Newtownshandrum, in what was their first ever meeting in the final. Midleton won the match by 1–12 to 1–10 to claim their third championship title overall and a first title in 16 years.

Midleton's John Fenton was the championship's top scorer with 1-18.

== Results ==
=== First round ===
7 May 1978 First round	Ballinhassig	2-13 - 1-11	Blackrock	Crosshaven Grounds
	B Coleman 1-3, D Coleman 0-6, D Brosnan 1-1, J Reynolds 0-2, JL O'Sullivan 0-1.		P Moylan 0-7, P Kavanagh 1-1, W Aherne 1-0, P O'Neill 0-1, S Grady 0-1, S Carroll 0-1.

7 May 1978 First round	Inniscarra	4-12 - 6-05	Passage	Páirc Uí Chaoimh
	T Ryan 1-7, G Keohane 2-1, F Cooper 1-0, P McDonnell 0-2, F O'Mahony 0-1, M Healy 0-1.		D Keane 2-0, G O'Sullivan 1-2, M Keane 1-1, J O'Sullivan 1-0, P Quigley 1-0, J McCarthy 0-2.

7 May 1978 First round	Newcestown	2-06 - 5-09	Newtownshandrum	Banteer Sportsfield

7 May 1978 First round	Cloughduv	3-08 - 4-09	Bishopstown	Coachford Sportsfield
	T Dunne 1-2, T Kelly 1-2, M Walsh 1-0, D O'Leary 0-3, P Lucey 0-1.		E Murphy 1-6, D Murphy 1-1, K Twomey 1-0, P Doyle 1-0, D O'Brien 0-1, J Crowley 0-1.

7 May 1978 First round	Mallow	1-07 - 3-10	Éire Óg	Páirc Uí Chaoimh
			C Malone 2-0, J O'Leary 0-5, M Flynn 1-1, D Flynn 0-2, M Malone 0-2.

7 May 1978 First round	St. Vincent's	4-05 - 1-19	Watergrasshill	Riverstown Sportsfield
				Referee: A Murphy (Glanmire)

14 May 1978 First round	Ballyhea	1-12 - 2-10	St. Finbarr's	Páirc Mhic Gearailt
	P Ryan 0-8, D Ryan 1-0, D Sullivan 0-2, W Shanahan 0-1, E McSweeney 0-1.		D Harrington 1-1, F O'Mahony 1-1, S Gillen 0-4, J Murphy 0-2, B Collins 0-2.

- Midleton received a bye in this round.

=== Quarter-finals ===
4 June 1978 Quarter-final	Inniscarra	0-06 - 1-11	Midleton	Riverstown Sportsfield
	T Ryan 0-4, G Keohane 0-1, T Cremin 0-1.		J Fenton 1-5, T McCarthy 0-3, J Glavin 0-2, D Hurley 0-1.

11 June 1978 Quarter-final	Ballinhassig	3-08 - 5-08	Newtownshandrum	Páirc Mhic Gearailt
	D Coleman 2-2, D Brosnan 1-0, ? 0-3, Reynolds 0-2, TF Hayes 0-1.		PJ Greensmith 2-0, D Morrissey 2-0, P Noonan 1-0, D Herlihy 0-2, J Buckley 0-1.

11 June 1978 Quarter-final	St. Finbarr's	3-03 - 1-11	Watergrasshill	Riverstown Sportsfield
	S Gillen 2-3, T O'Connor 1-0.		J Higgins 1-6, J Ryan 0-2, D Kearney 0-1, D Murphy 0-1, S O'Riordan 0-1.

1 July 1978 Quarter-final	Bishopstown	1-06 - 4-15	Éire Óg	Inniscarra Grounds
	D Murphy 1-0, E Murphy 0-3, R Murphy 0-1, D Healy 0-1, D O'Brien 0-1.		D O'Flynn 3-2, D Desmond 0-6, D O'Flynn 1-2, J O'Leary 0-3, M Malone 0-2.

=== Semi-finals ===
2 July 1978 Semi-final	Newtownshandrum	3-12 - 2-02	Watergrasshill	Castletownroche Grounds
	D Coughlan 1-5, L Bowles 1-2, B O'Connor 1-0, D Morris 0-1, P Greensmeith 0-1, P Noonan 0-1, P Herlihy 0-1, D Herlihy 0-1.		J Ryan 2-0, J Higgins 0-1, D Kearney 0-1.

8 July 1978 Semi-final	Midleton	2-09 - 1-10	Éire Óg	Church Road
	J Fenton 0-6, T McCarthy 1-0, S O'Farrell 1-0, W Glavin 0-1, S O'Brien 0-1, G Glavin 0-1.		D Desmond 0-5, C Malone 1-0, D Flynn 0-2, L O'Leary 0-1, M Malone 0-1, M Flynn 0-1.

=== Final ===
13 August 1978 Final	Midleton	1-12 - 1-10	Newtownshandrum	Páirc Mhic Gearailt
	J Fenton 0-7, D Hurley 1-2, D Mulcahy 0-1, J Hartnett 0-1, T McCarthy 0-1.		PJ Greensmith 1-0, J Buckley 0-3, D Coughlan 0-3, D Herlihy 0-2, P Coughlan 0-1, P Herlihy 0-1.	Referee: W Horgan (Brian Dillons)
