= 1947 Cork Intermediate Hurling Championship =

Irish hurling competition

- Champions: Ráthluirc (3rd title); M. O'Toole (captain)
- Runners-up: Newtownshandrum; E. Morrissey (captain)

The 1947 Cork Intermediate Hurling Championship was the 38th staging of the Cork Intermediate Hurling Championship since its establishment by the Cork County Board in 1909.

Rathluirc entered the championship as the defending champions.

The final was played on 23 November 1947 at the Athletic Grounds in Buttevant, between Rathluirc and Newtownshandrum, in what was their first ever meeting in the final. Rathluirc won the match by 4–07 to 4–04 to claim their second championship title overall and a second championship title in succession.

== Results ==
=== Final ===
23 November 1947 Final	Rathluirc	4-07 - 4-04	Newtownshandrum	Buttevant Athletic Grounds
