= 2014–15 Harty Cup =

Hurling tournament

2014–15 Dr Harty Cup
- Dates: 1 October 2014 – 21 February 2015
- Teams: 20
- Champions: Thurles CBS (11th title); Ronan Teehan (captain); Niall Cahill (manager)
- Runners-up: St Francis College; David Griffin (captain); Diarmuid Fahy (manager)

Tournament statistics
- Matches played: 47
- Goals scored: 137 (2.91 per match)
- Points scored: 1216 (25.87 per match)

The 2014–15 Dr Harty Cup was the 95th staging of the Harty Cup since its establishment in hurling by the Munster Council of Gaelic Athletic Association in 1918. The group stage placings were released in July 2014. The competition ran from 1 October 2014 to 21 February 2015

Ardscoi Rís unsuccessfully defended its title, in the semi-finals losing to St Francis College.

Thurles CBS won the Harty Cup final on 21 February 2015 at the Mallow GAA Complex, against St Francis College, in their first ever meeting in a final, 2–12 to 1–12, their 11th successive Harty Cup title overall after a hiatus from their last title in 2009.

== Group 1 ==
=== Group 1 table ===
Knockout stage

Team	Matches				Score			Pts
Team	Pld	W	D	L	For	Against	Diff	Pts
Thurles CBS	4	3	1	0	0	0	0	7
Ardscoil Rís	4	3	0	1	0	0	0	6
West Limerick Colleges	4	2	1	1	0	0	0	5
Blackwater CS	4	1	0	3	0	0	0	2
St Flannan's College	4	0	0	4	0	0	0	0

=== Group 1 results ===
1 October 2014 Round 1	Ardscoil Rís	1-20 - 0-09	Blackwater Community School	Cahir Grounds
	R Lynch 1-9.	Report

1 October 2014 Round 1	Thurles CBS	5-26 - 0-06	St Flannan's College	MacDonagh Park
	R Long 3-3, R Teehan 1-8 (0-6f, 0-1 65, N Heffernan 1-3, P Kennedy 0-5, M Stakelum 0-2, B Kelly, B McCarthy, J Butler, K Duggan, R Purcell 0-1 each.	Report	M Corry 0-2 (2f), S Kennedy (f), J Murphy, B Cahill (f), R Cahill (0-1) each.

15 October 2014 Round 2	Blackwater Community School	2-22 - 0-12	St Flannan's College	FitzGerald Park
	C Roche 1-10 (0-3 frees), T Barron 1-2, S Bennett 0-4 (2 frees 2 65’s), A Casey 0-2, S Mangan 0-1, J Henley 0-1, J Pender 0-1, J Neville 0-1.	Report	S Kennedy 0-5 (0-5 frees), A Kennedy 0-3, A Cassidy 0-2, B Cahill 0-2

15 October 2014 Round 2	Thurles CBS	1-15 - 3-09	West Limerick Colleges	Childers Road
	J Butler 1-2.	Report

5 November 2014 Round 3	West Limerick Colleges	3-17 - 0-09	St Flannan's College	O'Garney Park
	S Flanagan 0-11 (6frees, 1 ‘65), B Hurley 1-2, C Magner Flynn 1-1, L Ryan 1-0, S Keating, B Buckley and M Sexton 0-1 each.	Report	S Kennedy 0-5 (5frees), C Lynch and C Greegan 0-1 each.

11 November 2014 Round 3	Thurles CBS	3-12 - 0-12	Ardscoil Rís	MacDonagh Park
	R Long 1-3, J Butler 1-1, M Stakelum 1-0, R Teehan 0-3f, M O’Connor 0-2, N Heffernan, K Duggan & P Kennedy 0-1 each.	Report	R Lynch 0-7 (6f, 1 65), P Casey 0-2, C Boylan, C Houlihan & A Gillane 0-1 each.

19 November 2014 Round 4	Ardscoil Rís	1-21 - 0-11	West Limerick Colleges	FitzGerald Park
	P Casey 1-10 (0-2frees), R Lynch 0-5 (4frees, ‘65), E Mulcahy 0-2, M Mackey, T Grimes, C Boylan, P O’Loughlin 0-1 each.	Report	S Flanagan 0-5 (5frees), P Ahern and M Sexton 0-2 each, M Morrissey 0-1.

19 November 2014 Round 4	Thurles CBS	2-15 - 3-03	Blackwater Community School	Clonmel GAA Ground
		Report

8 December 2014 Round 5	Ardscoil Rís	3-14 - 2-11	St Flannan's College	O'Garney Park
	K Howard 1-3, D Fitzgerald and P O’Loughlin (0-2frees) 1-2 each, A Gillane 0-3 (1 ‘65), M Mackey and T Grimes 0-2 each.	Report	A Kennedy 2-3, S Kennedy 0-3 (3frees), B Cahill 0-2 (2frees), J Murphy, C Lynch, M Corry (free) 0-1 each.

3 December 2014 Round 5	West Limerick Colleges	6-11 - 1-14	Blackwater Community School	Dr Mannix Sportsfield
	S Flanagan 5-4.	Report

== Group 2 ==
=== Group 2 table ===
Knockout stage

Team	Matches				Score			Pts
Team	Pld	W	D	L	For	Against	Diff	Pts
Castletroy College	4	3	0	1	0	0	0	6
Gaelcholáiste Mhuire AG	4	3	0	1	0	0	0	6
St Colman's College	4	2	0	2	0	0	0	4
Scoil Na Tríonóide Naofa	4	2	0	2	0	0	0	4
De La Salle College	4	0	0	4	0	0	0	0

=== Group 2 results ===
1 October 2014 Round 1	St Colman's College	0-18 - 0-14	Scoil na Tríonóide Naofa	Leahy Park
	S Condon 0-6, J Kenneally 0-3, P Hannon 0-2 S Aherne 0-2, Dean Linehan 0-1, J O'Leary 0-1, C Leahy 0-1, Diarmuid Linehan 0-1, N O'Leary 0-1.	Report	B Murphy 0-3, S O'Connell 0-3, C Ryan 0-2, R Quirke 0-2, J Lonergan 0-2, M Feehan 0-1, M Coleman 0-1.

1 October 2014 Round 1	Gaelcholáiste Mhuire AG	1-14 - 1-10	De La Salle College Waterford	Ardmore Grounds
	É Ó Síocháin 1-2, D Ó Laoi 0-5, D Ó Breachtain 0-4, L Ó Cochlainn 0-1, C Ó hAinifín 0-1, D Ó Chonaing 0-1.	Report	S Ryan 0-7, M O'Mahony 1-0, I Long 0-1, M Mullally 0-1, T Douglas 0-1.

15 October 2014 Round 2	Gaelcholáiste Mhuire AG	2-14 - 0-07	St Colman's College	Felix Sarsfield Memorial Park
	D Ó Laoi 2-4, D Braham (two frees), D Ó Conaing (one free) 0-3 each, E Ó Síocháin, P de Faoite 0-2 each.	Report	P Hannon 0-4 (three frees, one 65), C Leahy (free), J O’Leary, B Davis 0-1 each.

15 October 2014 Round 2	Castletroy College	3-09 - 1-09	De La Salle College Waterford	Cahir Grounds
		Report

5 November 2014 Round 3	Scoil na Tríonóide Naofa	3-17 - 3-10	De La Salle College Waterford	Clonmel GAA Ground
		Report

5 November 2014 Round 3	Castletroy College	2-13 - 0-18	Gaelcholáiste Mhuire AG	Dr Mannix Sportsfield
	A La Touche Cosgrave (1-4, 0-3 frees), B Nash (0-5), E Hourigan (1-0), L Lyons (0-2, frees), A Kennedy and I Coates (0-1 each).	Report	D Braham (0-5, 0-3 frees, 0-1 65m), E Ó Siocháin (0-2 frees), É Ó Conaing (0-2 frees), D Ó Conaing and D Lee (0-3 each), L Ó Cochlan (0-1).

19 November 2014 Round 4	St Colman's College	5-11 - 0-05	De La Salle College Waterford	Fraher Field
	J O'Leary 2-2, S Condon 1-5, D Linehan 1-1, N O'Leary 1-0, K Cronin 0-2, C Leahy 0-1.	Report	T Douglas 0-3, P Walsh 0-2.

25 November 2014 Round 4	Scoil na Tríonóide Naofa	0-15 - 0-12	Castletroy College	Gaelic Grounds
	B Murphy 0-10 (8frees, 1 ‘65), C Ryan 0-4 (2frees), J Lonergan 0-1.	Report	A La Touche Cosgrave 0-5 (4frees), J Nicholas 0-3, B Nash 0-2, A Kennedy and C Nicholas 0-1 each.

3 December 2014 Round 5	Gaelcholáiste Mhuire AG	1-15 - 1-13	Scoil na Tríonóide Naofa	Mallow GAA Complex
	D Ó Conaing 1-5, É Ó Síocháin 0-4, É Ó Conaing 0-2, C Ó hAinifín 0-2, D Ó Laoi 0-1, L Ó Laoire 0-1.	Report	B Murphy 1-7, C Ryan 0-3, D Lonergan 0-1, R Quirke 0-1, D O'Dwyer 0-1.

3 December 2014 Round 5	Castletroy College	2-09 - 0-13	St Colman's College	Ballyagran Grounds
	B Nash 1-2, C Nicholas 1-0, M O'Dwyer 0-3, A La Touche-Cosgrave 0-2, L Lyons 0-1, A Kennedy 0-1.	Report	S Condon 0-9, J Kenneally 0-2, P Hannon 0-1, S Ahearne 0-1.

== Group 3 ==
=== Group 3 table ===
Knockout stage

Team	Matches				Score			Pts
Team	Pld	W	D	L	For	Against	Diff	Pts
St Francis College	4	4	0	0	0	0	0	8
Pobalscoil na Tríonóide	4	3	0	1	0	0	0	6
St Caimin's College	4	2	0	2	0	0	0	4
Our Lady's SS	4	1	0	3	0	0	0	2
Charleville CBS	4	0	0	4	0	0	0	0

=== Group 3 results ===
1 October 2014 Round 1	St Francis College	2-14 - 0-13	Charleville CBS	Mallow GAA Complex
	S Kingston 2-4, C Cormack 0-9 (7f, 1 65), D O’Mahony 0-1.	Report	D Jones (4f), T O’Mahony (two frees, one penalty) 0-4 each, J Barry 0-3, K Cregan, S Griffin 0-1 each.

1 October 2014 Round 1	Pobalscoil na Tríonóide	2-15 - 2-13	Our Lady's Secondary School	Clonmel GAA Ground
	D Dalton 1-14, C Hennessy 1-0, C Morrison 0-1.	Report	L Fairbrother 1-6, J Bergin 1-2, J Morrissey 0-2, S Nolan 0-1, A Ryan 0-1, B McGrath 0-1

14 October 2014 Round 2	Our Lady's Secondary School	1-20 - 2-14	Charleville CBS	Seán Treacy Park
	L Fairbrother 0-5(0-2f) K Hassett 0-3, R Natkaniec 1-0, A Ryan 0-2, J Bergin 0-2, J Moloney 0-2, S Nolan 0-2, B McGrath 0-2f, C Kinane 0-1, C Thornte 0-1f.	Report	T O’Mahony 1 -6(0-6f) D Fitzgibbon 1-1, S Griffin 0-3, P O’Loughlin 0-2f, J Barry 0-2.

15 October 2014 Round 2	Pobalscoil na Tríonóide	0-15 - 0-13	St Caimin's Community School	Dr Mannix Park
	D Dalton 0-11, M Farrell 0-1, C Deane 0-1, C Morrison 0-1, D O'Brien 0-1.	Report	A Shanagher 0-9, D Devanney 0-2, C Agnew 0-1, R Hayes 0-1.

5 November 2014 Round 3	St Francis College	1-18 - 1-08	Pobalscoil na Tríonóide	Caherlag Grounds
	C Cormack 0-13, S Kingston 1-2, E O'Brien 0-1, S Powter 0-1, L O'Sullivan 0-1.	Report	D Dalton 0-5, B Lynch 1-0, E O'Halloran 0-2, D O'Connell 0-1.

5 November 2014 Round 3	St Caimin's Community School	2-16 - 1-10	Our Lady's Secondary School	MacDonagh Park
		Report

19 November 2014 Round 4	St Francis College	0-16 - 0-13	St Caimin's Community School	Dr Mannix Sportsfield
	S Kingston 0-6, C Cormack 0-6, S Powter 0-2, J O'Sullivan 0-1, P Lynch 0-1.		B O'Gorman 0-10, A Shanagher 0-3.

19 November 2014 Round 4	Pobalscoil na Tríonóide	0-18 - 2-11	Charleville CBS	Páirc Mac Gearailt
	D Dalton 0-11, JP Lucey 0-2, M Farrell 0-2, E O'Halloran 0-2, C Ó hAonghusa 0-1.		T O'Mahony 2-7, D Fitzgibbon 0-3, K Cagney 0-1.

3 December 2014 Round 5	St Caimin's Community School	5-14 - 3-13	Charleville CBS	Clarina Grounds
		Report

5 December 2014 Round 5	St Francis College	2-13 - 0-16	Our Lady's Secondary School	Cahir Grounds
		Report

== Group 4 ==
=== Group 4 table ===
Knockout stage

Team	Matches				Score			Pts
Team	Pld	W	D	L	For	Against	Diff	Pts
Hamilton High School	4	4	0	0	0	0	0	8
Nenagh CBS	4	3	0	1	0	0	0	6
Midleton CBS	4	2	0	2	0	0	0	4
Dungarvan CBS	4	1	0	3	0	0	0	2
CBS High School Clonmel	4	0	0	4	0	0	0	0

=== Group 4 results ===
1 October 2014 Round 1	Hamilton High School	4-10 - 2-13	Nenagh CBS	Fr Con Buckley Park
	E O'Reilly 1-6, C Dinneen 1-1, C Maguire 1-1, J Mulcahy 1-0, C O'Leary 0-1, L Meade 0-1.	Report	A Hayden 2-1, K Nealon 0-7, J Cahalane 0-3, A Loughrane 0-1, J Cleary 0-1.

1 October 2014 Round 1	Dungarvan CBS	2-11 - 0-07	CBS High School Clonmel	Cappoquin Sportsfield
	D Lyons 0-6 (5fs, 1 65’), M Kearns 0-4 (2fs), G Waters, M Phelan 1-0 each, A Donnelly 0-1 (1f).		R Peters (2fs, 1 s-l), D Roberts (1f) 0-3 each, K Keogh 0-1.

15 October 2014 Round 2	Nenagh CBS	1-13 - 1-12	Dungarvan CBS	Leahy Park
		Report

15 October 2014 Round 2	Midleton CBS	0-11 - 0-10	CBS High School Clonmel	Fraher Field
	J Looney 0-4; K O’Sullivan 0-3 (3fs); G Leahy 0-2; B McCarthy, G Manley 0-1 each.	Report	R Peters 0-7 (6fs); D Roberts (f), P Maher (f), Matt Barlow 0-1 each.

5 November 2014 Round 3	Midleton CBS	3-12 - 1-11	Dungarvan CBS	Ardmore Grounds
	J Looney, G Leahy, J McDonnell 1-1 each; K O’Sullivan 0-4 (3fs); J Beausang (f), B Dunne, C Broderick, B McCarthy, C Treacy 0-1 each.		S Crotty 0-5; M Kearns 0-4 (4fs); D Lyons 1-0; P Curran 0-2.

5 November 2014 Round 3	Hamilton High School	5-13 - 3-13	CBS High School Clonmel	Clonmel GAA Ground
	E O'Reilly 2-6, S O'Donovan 2-0, J Mulcahy 1-1, C O'Leary 0-4, L Meade 0-1, D Curran 0-1.	Report	R Peters 3-8, D Roberts 0-4, G Ryan 0-1.

19 November 2014 Round 4	Hamilton High School	2-16 - 0-21	Midleton CBS	Church Road
	E O’Reilly 0-6 (four frees), C Maguire 1-2, J O’Mahony 1-0, D Curran, L Murray 0-2, C O’Leary (free), L Meade, J Mulcahy, J Kelleher 0-1 each.	Report	J Beausang 0-9 (four frees, one 65), J Looney 0-5, G Leahy 0-3, B Dunne, B McCarthy 0-2 each.

19 November 2014 Round 4	Nenagh CBS	1-17 - 0-16	CBS High School Clonmel	Páirc Shíleáin
		Report

3 December 2014 Round 5	Nenagh CBS	3-11 - 1-13	Midleton CBS	Clonmel GAA Ground
	K Nealon 0-7, J Cahalan 1-2, A Hayden 1-0, R Mulrooney 1-0, R Byrne 0-1, D Peters 0-1.	Report	J Beausang 0-6, G Leahy 1-1, J Looney 0-3, B Dunne 0-1, D Landers 0-1, J McDonnell 0-1.

3 December 2014 Round 5	Hamilton High School	2-13 - 0-11	Dungarvan CBS	Killeagh Grounds
	E O'Reilly 2-6, T O'Sullivan 0-3, C O'Leary 0-2, J Mulcahy 0-1, B Crowley 0-1.	Report	M Kearns 0-6, G Waters 0-1, L O'Connel 0-1, R Shine 0-1, A Kerwin 0-1, M Culloo 0-1.

== Results ==
=== Quarter-finals ===
9 January 2015 Quarter-final	Thurles CBS	2-08 - 1-10	Gaelcholáiste Mhuire AG	FitzGerald Park
	J Butler 1-2, B McCarthy 1-0, B Kelly, R Long 0-2 each, R Teehan, N Heffernan 0-1 (free) each.	Report	D Ó Laoi 1-3, D Ó Conaing 0-5 (four frees), A Ó Donnabháin 0-2.

15 January 2015 Quarter-final	St Francis College	3-09 - 2-08	Nenagh CBS	Dr Mannix Sportsfield
	C Cormack (1-4, 0-3 frees); P Lynch, L O’Sullivan (1-0 each); S Kingston (0-3); J Cashman, S Power (0-1 each).	Report	A Walsh (1-3, 0-3 frees); C Kelly (1-2, 1-2 frees); A Loughnane (0-2); J Clearly (0-1).

19 January 2015 Quarter-final	Ardscoil Rís	1-16 - 1-11	Hamilton High School	Dr Mannix Sportsfield
	M Mackey (0-5); R Lynch (1-2, 0-2 frees); A Gillane (0-4); P Casey (0-3); C Holihan (0-1 free), C Boylan (0-1 each).	Report	E O’Reilly (0-6, 0-3 frees); C O’Leary (0-3, 0-2 frees); S O’Donovan (1-0); D Curran, C Dineen (0-1 each).

21 January 2015 Quarter-final	Castletroy College	1-14 - 0-16	Pobalscoil Na Tríonóide	Cahir Grounds
	B Nash 1-4 (0-4f), A La Touche Cosgrave 0-3 (1f), I Coates, L Lyons & M O’Dwyer (2f) 0-2 each, A Kennedy 0-1.	Report	D Dalton 0-12 (10f), A Seoige 0-2, E O’Halloran & D O’Connell 0-1 each.

=== Semi-finals ===
31 January 2015 Semi-final	Thurles CBS	1-09 - 0-11	Castletroy College	St Michael's Park
	N Heffernan 0-7 (6 frees); R Long 1-0; K Duggan, M Connors 0-1 each.	Report	B Nash 0-8 (7 frees); A La Touche Cosgrave 0-3 (1 free)

31 January 2015 Semi-final	St Francis College	4-11 - 1-17	Ardscoil Rís	Dr Mannix Sportsfield
	S Powter 2-0, C Cormack 1-3 (three frees), S Kingston 1-2, J O’Sullivan, D O’Mahony 0-2 each, L O’Sullivan, D Meaney 0-1 each.	Report	R Lynch 1-9 (1-0 penalty, seven frees), P Casey 0-5 (two frees), N Fox, M Mackey, P O’Loughlin 0-1 each.

=== Final ===
21 February 2015 Final	Thurles CBS	2-12 - 1-12	St Francis College	Mallow GAA Complex
	B McCarthy 1-2, K Duggan 1-1, N Heffernan 0-4f, R Long 0-2, P Kennedy, R Teehan & M Connors 0-1 each.	Report	C Cormack 1-6 (0-5f), S Kingston 0-4, S Powter and D Meaney 0-1 each.
