= 2009 Cork Intermediate Football Championship =

Gaelic football competition

- Sponsor: Evening Echo
- Champions: Carrigaline (1st title)
- Runners-up: Cill Na Martra

The 2009 Cork Intermediate Football Championship was the 74th staging of the Cork Intermediate Football Championship since its establishment by the Cork County Board in 1909.

The final was played on 30 August 2009 at Páirc Uí Chaoimh in Cork, between Carrigaline and Cill Na Martra, in what was their first ever meeting in the final. Carrigaline won the match by 0–11 to 0–08 to claim their first ever championship title.

== Results ==
=== Final ===
30 August 2009 Final	Carrigaline	1-12 - 3-04	Cill Na Martra	Páirc Uí Chaoimh
