= Daniel Hogan =

Daniel Hogan may refer to:

- Daniel Hogan (Lieutenant-General) (1895–?), Irish Defence Forces Chief of Staff, 1927–1929
- Daniel Hogan (sailor) (died 1818), sailor in the United States Navy
- Daniel Hogan (Irish politician) (1899–1980), Irish Fianna Fáil politician, TD for Laois-Offaly and later a Senator
- Daniel Hogan (Illinois politician) (1849–1912), Irish American politician, Illinois Senate
- Danny Hogan, American mobster
