= 1946 Cork Intermediate Hurling Championship =

Irish hurling competition

- Champions: Ráth Luirc (2nd title)
- Runners-up: Cloughduv

The 1946 Cork Intermediate Hurling Championship was the 37th staging of the Cork Intermediate Hurling Championship since its establishment by the Cork County Board in 1909.

The final was played on 29 November 1946 at the Athletic Grounds in Cork, between Rathluirc and Cloughduv, in what was their first ever meeting in the final. Rathluirc won the match by 8–06 to 4–06 to claim their first ever championship title.

== Results ==
=== Final ===
29 September 1946 Final	Rathluirc	8-06 - 4-06	Cloughduv	Cork Athletic Grounds
