= Fr O'Neill's GAA =

Gaelic games club in Cork, Ireland

Fr O'Neill's
- An t-Athar Uí Néill
- Founded: 1959
- County: Cork
- Colours: Green and Red
- Grounds: Fr O'Neill's Sports Complex

Playing kits
Standard colours

Senior Club Championships
	All Ireland	Munster champions	Cork champions
Football:	0	0	0
Hurling:	0	0	0
Camogie:	0	0	1

Fr O'Neill's GAA is a Gaelic Athletic Association club in Ballymacoda, County Cork, Ireland. The club is affiliated to the Imokilly Board and fields teams in both hurling and Gaelic football.

== History ==
Located in the parish of Ballymacoda and Ladysbridge in east Cork, Fr O'Neill's GAA Club was founded in 1959. The club is named in honour of Peter O'Neill Crowley who died in the Fenian Rising in 1867 and is buried in Ballymacoda. The club has spent the majority of its existence operating in the junior grade, and won several East Cork JBHC and JBFC titles between 1972 and 1992.

Fr O'Neill's made their big breakthrough when, in 1996, they won the East Cork JAHC. It was the first of five such titles in a 10-year period. The fifth and final divisional title in 2005 was subsequently converted into a Cork JAHC title, following a 0-15 to 1-09 defeat of Kilworth in the final. After adding the Munster Club JHC title to their collection, Fr O'Neill's later beat Erin's Own by 2-16 to 2-10 in the 2006 All-Ireland Club JHC final.

The club continued to secure further promotions after claiming Cork IHC titles in 2007 and 2016. Fr O'Neill's secured senior status for the first time in their history when, in 2019, the club beat old rivals Kilworth to secure the Cork PIHC title. The Munster Club IHC title was also claimed, however, Fr O'Neill's were later beaten by Tullaroan in the 2020 All-Ireland Club IHC final. After losing the two previous finals, Fr O'Neill's won the Cork SAHC title in 2022, after beating Courcey Rovers by 0–20 to 2–12 in the final.

== Honours ==
- Cork Senior A Hurling Championship (1): 2022
- Cork Premier Intermediate Hurling Championship 2019
- Cork Intermediate Hurling Championship (2): 2007, 2016
- All-Ireland Junior Club Hurling Championship (1): 2006
- Munster Junior Club Hurling Championship (1): 2005
- Cork Junior A Hurling Championship (1): 2005
- East Cork Junior A Hurling Championship (5): 1996, 1999, 2001, 2002, 2005
- East Cork Junior A Football Championship (4): 1996, 1998, 2006, 2015
- Cork Junior B Inter-Divisional Hurling Championship (1) : 2024
- East Cork Junior B Hurling Championship (4): 1972, 1979, 2015, 2024
- East Cork Junior B Football Championship (3): 1988, 1992, 2022
- Cork Premier Under-21 A Hurling Championship (1): 2018
- Cork Premier 2 Minor Hurling Championship (1): 2011

== Notable players ==
- Declan Dalton: National Hurling League-winner (2025)
- Ger Millerick: National Hurling League-winner (2025)
