= Carrigaline GAA =

Gaelic sports club in County Cork, Ireland

Carrigaline
- Carraig Uí Leighin
- Founded: 1884
- County: Cork
- Colours
- Grounds: Carrigaline GAA Grounds
- Coordinates: 51°48′41.50″N 8°22′49.03″W

Playing kits
Standard colours

Senior Club Championships
	All Ireland	Munster champions	Cork champions
Football:	0	0	0

Carrigaline Hurling & Football Club is a Gaelic Athletic Association club in Carrigaline, County Cork, Ireland. The club is affiliated to the Carrigdhoun Board and fields teams in both hurling and Gaelic football.

== History ==
Located in the town of Carrigaline, about 12 km south of Cork, Carrigaline Hurling & Football Club is one of the oldest clubs in the county, if not the country, having been formed in the early days of the Gaelic Athletic Association in 1884. The club has spent the majority of its existence operating in the junior grades and won the inaugural South East JAHC title in 1926. It was the first of 10 such titles. Carrigaline have also been regular winners of the South East JAFC and have claimed 14 titles in all.

The 21st century brought a number of successes in both codes. Carrigaline won the Cork IHC and the Cork IFC titles after respective defeats of Bandon in 2008 and Cill na Martra in 2009. The club achieved senior status for the first time in 2015, when the Cork PIFC was won after a 0–12 to 0–11 defeat of St Michael's. Almost a decade later, Carrigaline once again reached the top tier when the club won the Cork SAFC title after a two-point win over Knocknagree.

== Honours ==
- Cork Senior A Football Championship (1): 2024
- Cork Premier Intermediate Football Championship (1): 2015
- Cork Intermediate A Hurling Championship (1): 2008
- Cork Intermediate A Football Championship (1): 2009
- Cork Junior B Inter-Divisional Football Championship (1): 2025
- Cork Premier 1 Minor Football Championship (2): 2014, 2026
- South East Junior A Hurling Championship (10): 1926, 1935, 1938, 1944, 1947, 1974, 1982, 1983, 1990, 2003
- South East Junior A Football Championship (14): 1936, 1938, 1939, 1940, 1955, 1957, 1959, 1967, 1968, 1969, 1990, 1991, 1992, 2026
- Kelleher Shield (Senior Football League) (1): 2024
- South-East Junior B Hurling Championship (1): 2003
- South-East Junior B Football Championship (4): 2015, 2016, 2020, 2025
- South-East Under 21 A Hurling Championship (7): 1982, 1988, 2007, 2011, 2013, 2014, 2022
- South-East Under 21 A Football Championship (18): 1966, 1972, 1979, 1988, 1989, 1992, 1997, 1998, 2003, 2008, 2011, 2012, 2017, 2018, 2019, 2022, 2023, 2026
- South-East Under 21 B Football Championship (2): 1995, 2010
- South-East Minor A Football Championship (6): 1939, 1952, 1964, 1985, 1988, 2002
- South-East Minor A Hurling Championship (9): 1976, 1977, 1979, 1983, 1985, 1986, 1994, 2003, 2004
- Féile na nGael Division 2 (1): 2002

== Notable players ==
- Nicholas Murphy: All-Ireland SFC–winner (2010)
- Rob O'Shea: All-Ireland SHC runner-up (2013)
- Tim G Cronin: South East Junior A Football Championship - Winner (2026) top scorer (2025,2026)
