= Charleville GAA =

Gaelic games club in County Cork, Ireland

Charleville
- Rathluirc
- Founded: 1888
- County: Cork
- Nickname: The Town
- Colours
- Grounds: Dr Mannix Sportsfield
- Coordinates: 52°21′07.85″N 8°40′38.03″W

Playing kits
Standard colours

Charleville GAA is a Gaelic Athletic Association club in Charleville, County Cork, Ireland. The club is affiliated to the North Cork Board and fields teams in both hurling and Gaelic football.

== History ==
Located in the town of Charleville on the Cork-Limerick border, Rathluirc GAA Club, later renamed Charleville GAA Club, was founded in 1888. The original colours were black and white, with the nickname of the Magpies bestowed, and the club drawing players from a wide area around North Cork. After the introduction of the parish rule the colours were changed to red and white.

Charleville had its first major success in 1914 when it was awarded the Cork IHC title, after receiving a walkover from Shamrocks. A North Cork JHC title was won in 1945, followed by consecutive Cork IHC titles in 1946 and 1947 after a decision was taken to make the step up to the higher grade. After securing senior status, the club eventually regraded to intermediate and eventually back to the junior ranks. Charleville continued to have divisional success and won eight North Cork JHC titles between 1970 and 2011.

Charleville had its most successful era between 2011 and 2020. The club beat Mayfield in a replay to win the Cork JAHC title for the first time in 2011. The Munster Club JHC title followed, however, Charleville were subsequently beaten by St. Patrick's, Ballyragget in the 2012 All-Ireland Club JFC final. Charleville followed this by claiming their fourth Cork IHC title after a 5–24 to 1–10 win over Dripsey in 2015. The club secured another promotion in 2018 after beating Courcey Rovers in a replay to win the Cork PIHC title. The Munster Club IHC title was later won, however, Charleville were again beaten in the All-Ireland final. Charleville ended their most successful decade by winning the Cork SAHC title after a 3–12 to 1–14 win over Fr O'Neill's in 2020.

== Honours ==
- Cork Senior A Hurling Championship (1): 2020
- Munster Intermediate Club Hurling Championship (1): 2018
- Cork Premier Intermediate Hurling Championship (1) 2018
- Cork Intermediate Hurling Championship (4): 1914, 1946, 1947, 2015
- Munster Junior Club Hurling Championship (1): 2011
- Cork Junior A Hurling Championship (1): 2011
- Cork Junior B Football Championship (2): 1998, 2013
- North Cork Junior A Football Championship (3): 2018, 2020, 2025
- North Cork Junior A Hurling Championship (9): 1945, 1970, 1974, 1986, 2001, 2002, 2007, 2008, 2011
- North Cork Under-21 Hurling Championship (4): 2011, 2016, 2017, 2019
- Cork Under-21 B Football Championship (1) 2018
- Cork Minor A Hurling Championship (2): 1994, 2010

== Notable players ==
- Darragh Fitzgibbon: Munster SHC-winner (2017, 2018, 2025) All-Star winner 2018, 2024, 2025.
- Billy Galligan: All-Ireland IHC-winner (1965)
