= 1991 Cork Intermediate Hurling Championship =

Irish hurling competition

- Dates: 18 May – 24 August 1991
- Teams: 22
- Champions: Tracton (1st title); Billy Long (captain); Michael O'Brien (manager)
- Runners-up: Inniscarra; Ger Manley (captain); Pat McDonnell (manager)

Tournament statistics
- Matches played: 24
- Goals scored: 102 (4.25 per match)
- Points scored: 514 (21.42 per match)
- Top scorer(s): Ger Manley (4-30)

The 1991 Cork Intermediate Hurling Championship was the 82nd staging of the Cork Intermediate Hurling Championship since its establishment by the Cork County Board in 1909. The draw for the opening round fixtures took place on 16 December 1990. The championship ran from 18 May to 24 August 1991.

The final was played on 24 August 1991 at Páirc Uí Chaoimh in Cork between Tracton and Inniscarra, in what was their first meeting in the final. Tracton won the match by 4–14 to 5–09 to claim their first ever championship title.

Inniscarra's Ger Manley was the championship's top scorer with 4-30.

== Team changes ==
=== To Championship ===
Promoted from the Cork Junior Hurling Championship

- Midleton

=== From Championship ===
Regraded to the West Cork Junior A Hurling Championship

- Ballinascarthy

== Results ==
=== First round ===
18 May 1991 First round	Midleton	1-17 - 2-13	Mallow	Castlelyons
	G Glavin 1-1, N O'Neill 0-4, C O'Neill 0-3, V O'Neill 0-2, B Gleeson 0-2, J Fenton 0-2, E Crotty 0-1, K McCarthy 0-1, E Harty 0-1.		R Sheehan 0-9, R O'Connell 1-1, T Coakley 1-1, Jody Hayes 0-1, R Glynn 0-1.

26 May 1991 First round	Delanys	2-10 - 5-17	St Catherine's	Bride Rovers Park
	G Healy 0-6, D McElhinney 1-2, M McElhinney 1-1, B Egan 0-1.		D Walsh 2-5, C Clancy 1-8, C Casey 1-2, B O'Regan 1-0, D O'Leary 0-1, S Buckley 0-1.

1 June 1991 First round	Kilbrittain	2-10 - 1-07	Newtownshandrum	Coachford Sportsfield
	D O'Connell 1-4, P Brennan 1-0, T McCarthy 0-2, G O'Connell 0-2, D O'Neill 0-1, T Brennan 0-1.		J O'Mahony 1-1, J Coughlan 0-3, M Reidy 0-2, J Ryan 0-1.

1 June 1991 First round	Clyda Rovers	2-09 - 3-12	St Finbarr's	Blarney
	T O'Callaghan 0-6, T McGlinchey 1-0, J O'Sullivan 1-0, M O'Hanlon 0-2, Cormac O'Sullivan 0-1.		K O'Brien 2-2, P Clarke 1-0, P O'Shea 0-3, F O'Brien 0-3, B O'Connell 0-2, J Tobin 0-1, C Murphy 0-1.	Referee: P Spillane (Carrigtwohill)

1 June 1991 First round	St Vincent's	0-08 - 3-13	Bishopstown	Ballinlough
	D Murphy 0-3, W Leahy 0-2, A McCarthy 0-1, J Downey 0-1, J Daly 0-1.		R O'Doherty 1-2, V Murray 1-1, C Coffey 0-4, T O'Leary 1-0, N Crowley 0-3, A O'Sullivan 0-3.	Referee: M O'Flaherty (Blackrock)

1 June 1991 First round	Douglas	2-05 - 3-08	Inniscarra	Ballinora
	M Cronin 1-1, P Daly 0-4, J Quirke 1-0.		G Manley 1-8, D Hennessy 2-0.	Referee: G Harrington (Carrigaline)

=== Second round ===
25 May 1991 Second round	Cloughduv	4-10 - 2-11	Cloyne	Páirc Uí Chaoimh
	K Murray 1-6, C Barry-Murphy 2-0, DP Ring 1-0, T Barry-Murphy 0-3, J Grainger 0-1.		G Lewis 1-2, M Lynch 0-5, Philip Cahill 1-0, J Lewis 0-1, P O'Shea 0-1, T O'Sullivan 0-1, Paul Cahill 0-1.

25 May 1991 Second round	Éire Óg	3-05 - 2-08	Cobh	Kilbarry
	V O'Connell 1-0, P Bradley 1-0, S Healy 1-0, D Desmond 0-2, J Murphy 0-1, D Collins 0-1, K Murray 0-1.		P Kavanagh 2-0, T Butler 0-4, M Meaney 0-1, G Morgan 0-1, M Daly 0-1, J Hegarty 0-1.

25 May 1991 Second round	Ballymartle	3-16 - 3-09	Na Piarsaigh	Páirc Liam Mhic Cárthaigh
	M Fitzgerald 1-8, C Deasy 1-3, T Allen 1-0, B Deasy 0-2, J O'Mahony 0-2, P Deasy 0-1.		J O'Meara 3-3, R Dalton 0-3, R Kelleher 0-1, L O'Callaghan 0-1, P Connery 0-1.

25 May 1991 Second round	Blackrock	2-04 - 4-21	Glen Rovers	Ballinlough
	M Salmon 1-4, T Aherne 1-0.		T Harte 0-8, R Murphy 1-2, C O'Riordan 0-5, P O'Neill 1-1, D Whitley 0-4, C Deane 1-0, J O'Brien 1-0, K Hendrick 0-1.	Referee: P O'Neill (Shamrocks)

26 May 1991 Second round	Youghal	2-06 - 1-10	Tracton	Páirc Uí Chaoimh
	T Coyne 1-4, M McCarthy 1-0, D Daly 0-1, P Coady 0-1.		L Kelly 1-1, DJ Kiely 0-4, P Murphy 0-2, M Quinn 0-2, K Kingston 0-1.

9 June 1991 Second round	Midleton	2-12 - 1-12	St Catherine's	Páirc Lios gCúl
	J Fenton 2-5, C O'Neill 0-3, N O'Neill 0-2, M Crotty 0-1, B Cotter 0-1.		C Clancy 0-10, C Casey 1-1, M Mellerick 0-1.

15 June 1991 Second round replay	Éire Óg	1-15 - 1-19	Cobh	Kilbarry
	P Bradley 1-3, D Desmond 0-6, K Murphy 0-2, G Murphy 0-1, V O'Connell 0-1, B O'Leary 0-1, J O'Sullivan 0-1.		G Morgan 0-9, P Kavanagh 1-2, T Butler 0-3, J Hegarty 0-2, M Meaney 0-1, T Anderson 0-1, C Crowe 0-1.

15 June 1991 Second round	Kilbrittain	3-05 - 3-09	Bishopstown	Riverstick
	C O'Connell 2-1, S O'Connell 1-0 (og), D O'Connell 0-1, J O'Connell 0-1, M Holland 0-1, T Brennan 0-1.		N Crowley 2-0, C Coffey 1-1, R O'Doherty 0-3, V Murray 0-2, T Keating 0-2, B Murphy 0-1.	Referee: G Harrington (Carrigaline)

15 June 1991 Second round	Inniscarra	1-18 - 1-06	St Finbarr's	Ballincollig
	G Manley 0-12, M O'Donoghue 1-0, D Murphy 0-3, P O'Connell 0-1, P Ahern 0-1, G O'Mahony 0-1.		J Tobin 0-4, J Collins 1-0, C Murphy 0-1, K Nagle 0-1.

=== Quarter-finals ===
28 June 1991 Quarter-final	Midleton	0-09 - 0-08	Glen Rovers	Erin's Own Grounds
	J Fenton 0-5, C O'Neill 0-2, B Gleeson 0-1, E Crotty 0-1.		T Harte 0-4, D Whitley 0-4.

5 July 1991 Quarter-final	Cloughduv	2-11 - 0-09	Cobh	Church Road
	K Murray 1-6, L Lynch 1-0, T Barry-Murphy 0-3, B McSweeney 0-1, J Grainger 0-1.		T Butler 0-4, G Morgan 0-3, T Anderson 0-1, M Daly 0-1.

6 July 1991 Quarter-final	Inniscarra	2-07 -1-09	Bishopstown	Ballincollig
	D Murphy 2-2, G Manley 0-2, R Maher 0-2, C Holland 0-1.		N Crowley 1-0, R O'Doherty 0-3, A O'Sullivan 0-2, J Ryan 0-2, V Murray 0-1, T O'Leary 0-1.

13 July 1991 Quarter-final	Tracton	2-13 - 2-10	Ballymartle	Carrigaline
	P Murphy 1-4, K Kingston 1-0, DJ Kiely 0-4, B Long 0-1, J O'Callaghan 0-1, J Kingston 0-1, M Quinn 0-1, L Kelly 0-1.		M Fitzaptrick 0-6, E McCarthy 1-1, P Deasy 1-0, T Allen 0-1, C Deasy 0-1, J O'Mahony 0-1.

=== Semi-finals ===
27 July 1991 Semi-final	Inniscarra	1-13 - 0-16	Midleton	Church Road
	G Manley 1-6, D Murphy 0-2, P Ahern 0-2, P O'Connell 0-2, G O'Mahony 0-1.		J Fenton 0-7, N O'Neill 0-3, E Crotty 0-2, V O'Neill 0-1, C O'Neill 0-1, G Glavin 0-1, M Crotty 0-1.

28 July 1991 Semi-final	Tracton	1-12 - 3-06	Cloughduv	Inishannon Sportsfield
	P Murphy 0-7, K Kingston 1-1, DN Lynch 0-1, M Quinn 0-1, J O'Callaghan 0-1, B Quinn 0-1.		K Murray 1-5, C Barry-Murphy 1-0, L Lynch 1-0, T Barry-Murphy 0-1.

4 August 1991 Semi-final replay	Inniscarra	5-16 - 4-11 (aet)	Midleton	Church Road
	D Murphy 0-8, K Murphy 2-1, M McDonnell 2-0, G Manley 1-1, G O'Mahony 0-2, R Maher 0-2, P Aherne 0-1, M Ryan 0-1.		G Glavin 2-2, C O'Neill 2-1, J Fenton 0-5, E Crotty 0-2, B Gleeson 0-1.

11 August 1991 Semi-final replay	Tracton	3-11 - 2-05	Cloughduv	Inishannon Sportsfield
	P Murphy 0-7, K Kingston 1-1, L Kelly 1-0, J Kingston 1-0, B Long 0-1, J O'Callaghan 0-1, M Quinn 0-1.		K Murray 1-3, J Riordan 1-0, T Barry-Murphy 0-2.

=== Final ===
24 August 1991 Final	Tracton	4-14 - 5-09	Inniscarra	Páirc Uí Chaoimh
	P Murphy 1-9, K Kingston 1-2, J O'Callaghan 1-0, J Kingston 1-0, W O'Flynn 0-1, L Kelly 0-1, M Quinn 0-1.		M O'Donoghue 2-1, D Murphy 0-5, G Manley 1-1, R Maher 1-1, P O'Connell 1-1.

== Championship statistics ==
=== Top scorers ===
Top scorers overall

Rank	Player	Club	Tally	Total	Matches	Average
1	Ger Manley	Inniscarra	4-30	42	6	7.00
2	Pat Murphy	Tracton	2-29	35	5	7.00
3	Kevin Murray	Cloughduv	4-20	32	4	8.00
4	John Fenton	Midleton	2-24	30	5	6.00
5	Derry Murphy	Inniscarra	2-20	26	6	4.33
6	Christy Clancy	St Catherine's	1-18	21	2	10.50
7	Kieran Kingston	Tracton	4-05	17	5	3.40
7	Martin Fitzpatrick	Ballymartle	1-14	17	2	8.50
9	Colm O'Neill	Midleton	2-10	16	5	3.20
10	Ger Glavin	Midleton	3-04	13	5	2.60
10	Ger Morgan	Cobh	0-13	13	3	4.33

Top scorers in a single game

Rank	Player	Club	Tally	Total	Opposition
1	Joe O'Meara	Na Piarsaigh	3-03	12	Ballymartle
1	Pat Murphy	Tracton	1-09	12	Inniscarra
1	Ger Manley	Inniscarra	0-12	12	St Finbarr's
4	Denis Walsh	St Catherine's	2-05	11	Delaneys
4	John Fenton	Midleton	2-05	11	St Catherine's
4	Martin Fitzpatrick	Ballymartle	1-08	11	Na Piarsaigh
4	Christy Clancy	St Catherine's	1-08	11	Delaneys
4	Ger Manley	Inniscarra	1-08	11	Douglas
9	Christy Clancy	St Catherine's	0-10	10	Midleton
10	Kevin Murray	Cloughduv	1-06	9	Cloyne
10	Kevin Murray	Cloughduv	1-06	9	Cobh
10	Ger Manley	Inniscarra	1-06	9	Midleton
10	Ronan Sheehan	Mallow	0-09	9	Midleton
10	Ger Morgan	Cobh	0-09	9	Éire Óg
