= 1981 Cork Junior Hurling Championship =

Irish hurling competition

- Dates: 27 September – 1 November 1981
- Teams: 7
- Champions: Milford (1st title); Seán O'Gorman (captain); Bernie O'Connor (manager)
- Runners-up: St. Catherine's; Seán Neville (captain); Denis Coughlan (manager)

Tournament statistics
- Matches played: 9
- Goals scored: 39 (4.33 per match)
- Points scored: 172 (19.11 per match)
- Top scorer: Christy Clancy (0-13)

The 1981 Cork Junior Hurling Championship was the 84th staging of the Cork Junior Hurling Championship since its establishment by the Cork County Board. The championship ran from 27 September to 1 November 1981.

On 1 November 1981, Milford won the championship following a 1–10 to 0–11 defeat of St. Catherine's in the final. It remains their only championship title.

Christy Clancy was the championship's top scorer with 0-13.

== Qualification ==
Division	Championship	Champions
Avondhu	North Cork Junior A Hurling Championship	Milford
Carbery	South West Junior A Hurling Championship	Barryroe
Carrigdhoun	South East Junior A Hurling Championship	Shamrocks
Duhallow	Duhallow Junior A Hurling Championship	Meelin
Imokilly	East Cork Junior A Hurling Championship	St. Catherine's
Muskerry	Mid Cork Junior A Hurling Championship	Aghabullogue
Seandún	City Junior A Hurling Championship	St. Finbarr's

== Results ==
=== Quarter-finals ===
27 September 1981 Quarter-final	Meelin	3-11 - 3-17	Shamrocks	Bishop Casey Memorial Park
	J Brosnan 1-2, N Brosnan 1-2, B O'Connor 0-5, D Buckley 1-0, M Fitzpatrick 0-1, J Browne 0-1.		J McCarthy 1-6, G Hanley 1-3, J O'Callaghan 1-1, W Murphy 0-2, E Hanley 0-1, W Ashman 0-1, J Murphy 0-1, J Dineen 0-1, C Twomey 0-1.

4 October 1981 Quarter-final	St. Catherine's	4-11 - 3-08	Aghabullogue	Páirc Uí Chaoimh
	J Mangan 2-0, D Walsh 1-1, C Clancy 0-4, W Kearney 1-0, M Mellerick 0-3, D O'Neill 0-2, D Mangan 0-1.		B Kenneally 1-1, V Coakley 1-1, L Quinlan 1-0, S Noonan 0-2, Der Walsh 0-2, G Coakley 0-1, M Healy 0-1.	Referee: M Flaherty (Blackrock)

11 October 1981 Quarter-final	St. Finbarr's	2-11 - 0-11	Barryroe	Charlie Hurley Park
	T Mullins 1-3, J McCarthy 1-0, T Walsh 0-3, S Gillen 0-2, J Desmond 0-1, L Walsh 0-1, F O'Mahony 0-1.		K White 0-8, P Lawton 0-1, M Moloney 0-1 D Madden 0-1.

- Milford received a bye in this round.

=== Semi-finals ===
25 October 1981 Semi-final	St. Catherine's	0-09 - 0-08	Shamrocks	Páirc Uí Chaoimh
	C Clancy 0-3, M Mellerick 0-2, D Mangan 0-1, D O'Neill 0-1, J Mangan 0-1, O Twomey 0-1.		W Murphy 0-2, W Ashman 0-1, J Dineen 0-1, J McCarthy 0-1, G Hanley 0-1, C Twomey 0-1, E Hanley 0-1.

25 October 1981 Semi-final	Milford	1-12 - 2-04	St. Finbarr's	Kanturk Grounds
	M Fitzgibbon 0-5, T Sheehan 1-1, V Sheehan 0-3, N Fitzgibbon 0-1, S O'Gorman 0-1, J O'Gorman 0-1.		S Gillen 1-0, J McCarthy 1-0, F O'Malley 0-1, T O'Connor 0-1, D Mehigan 0-1, F Ramsey 0-1.

=== Final ===
1 November 1981 Final	Milford	1-10 - 0-11	St. Catherine's	Páirc Uí Chaoimh
	T Sheehan 1-1, V Sheehan 0-3, M Fitzgibbon 0-2, S O'Gorman 0-2, N Fitzgibbon 0-1, S Sheehan 0-1.		C Clancy 0-6, M Mellerick 0-3, W Kearney 0-1, D Walsh 0-1.	Referee: F Murphy (Blackrock)

== Championship statistics ==
=== Top scorers ===
Overall

Rank	Player	Club	Tally	Total	Matches	Average
1	Christy Clancy	St. Catherine's	0-13	13	3	4.33
2	Justin McCarthy	Shamrocks	1-07	10	2	5.00
3	Ted Sheehan	Milford	2-02	8	2	4.00
3	Kieran White	Barryroe	0-08	8	1	8.00
3	Michael Mellerick	St. Catherine's	0-08	8	3	2.66

In a single game

Rank	Player	Club	Tally	Total	Opposition
1	Justin McCarthy	Shamrocks	1-06	9	Meelin
2	Kieran White	Barryroe	0-08	8	St. Finbarr's
3	John Mangan	St. Catherine's	2-00	6	Aghabullogue
3	Ger Hanley	Shamrocks	1-03	6	Meelin
3	Tony Mullins	St. Finbarr's	1-03	6	Barryroe
3	Christy Clancy	St. Catherine's	0-06	6	Milford
7	Ned Brosnan	Meelin	1-02	5	Shamrocks
7	Jack Brosnan	Meelin	1-02	5	Shamrocks
7	Bernie O'Connor	Meelin	0-05	5	Shamrocks
7	Mossy Fitzgibbon	Milford	0-05	5	St. Finbarr's

=== Miscellaneous ===
- Bernie O'Connor had the unusual distinction of playing for Meelin while also serving as coach of Milford.
