= 1983 Cork Junior Hurling Championship =

Irish hurling competition

- Dates: 25 September – 6 November 1983
- Teams: 7
- Champions: St. Catherine's (1st title); Batt O'Connell (captain); Denis Coughlan (manager)
- Runners-up: Aghabullogue; Richard Healy (captain); Murty Murphy (manager)

Tournament statistics
- Matches played: 6
- Goals scored: 23 (3.83 per match)
- Points scored: 108 (18 per match)
- Top scorer(s): Christy Clancy (1-18)

The 1983 Cork Junior Hurling Championship was the 86th staging of the Cork Junior Hurling Championship since its establishment by the Cork County Board. The championship began on 25 September 1983 and ended on 6 November 1983.

On 6 November 1983, St. Catherine's won the championship following a 1–13 to 1–08 defeat of Aghabullogue in the final at Páirc Uí Chaoimh. It was their first ever championship title.

== Qualification ==
Division	Championship	Champions
Avondhu	North Cork Junior A Hurling Championship	Kilworth
Carbery	South West Junior A Hurling Championship	Clonakilty
Carrigdhoun	South East Junior A Hurling Championship	Carrigaline
Duhallow	Duhallow Junior A Hurling Championship	Lismire
Imokilly	East Cork Junior A Hurling Championship	St. Catherine's
Muskerry	Mid Cork Junior A Hurling Championship	Aghabullogue
Seandún	City Junior A Hurling Championship	Douglas

== Results ==
=== Quarter-finals ===
25 September 1983 Quarter-final	Douglas	2-09 - 0-07	Lismire	Coachford Sportsfield
	A Cotter 1-1, P Daly 0-4, T Flaherty 1-0, P Lynch 0-3, P Walsh 0-1.		J O'Connor 0-6, E Loughlin 0-1.

2 October 1983 Quarter-final	St. Catherine's	5-12 - 3-04	Kilworth	Bride Rovers Park
	J Murphy 3-1, C Clancy 0-7, W Kearney 2-0, D O'Neill 0-2, D Walsh 0-2.		J O'Flynn 1-1, T Shanahan 1-0, M Gowen 1-0, P Shanahan 0-2, K McCarthy 0-1.

16 October 1983 Quarter-final	Carrigaline	1-15 - 0-09	Clonakilty	Kilbrittain Grounds
	J O'Donovan 0-7, A Fahy 1-0, A Deasy 0-2, M Drinan 0-1, R Hegarty 0-1, B Barry 0-1, B Scanlon 0-1, J Drinan 0-1, M Fitzgerald 0-1,		D Noonan 0-5, F O'Regan 0-2, D McCarthy 0-1, D Walsh 0-1.

=== Semi-finals ===
16 October 1983 Semi-final	Aghabullogue	2-09 - 3-04	Douglas	Ballinhassig Grounds
	D Walsh 1-2, S Noonan 0-5, MP Buckley 1-1, M Forde 0-1.		E Forde 2-2, T Flaherty 1-0, T Walsh 0-2.

23 October 1983 Semi-final	St. Catherine's	2-12 - 3-06	Carrigaline	Páirc Séamus de Barra
	C Clancy 1-6, W Kearney 1-1, J Mangan 0-2, W Walsh 0-1, D O'Neill 0-1, D Mellerick 0-1.		B Scanlon 2-0, J Drinan 0-5, M Fitzgerald 1-0, A Fahy 0-1.

=== Final ===
6 November 1983 Final	St. Catherine's	1-13 - 1-08	Aghabullogue	Páirc Uí Chaoimh
	D Walsh 0-5, C Clancy 0-5, D O'Neill 1-0, P Clancy 0-2, W Kearney 0-1.		S Noonan 0-5, MP Buckley 1-1, T Noonan 0-1, M Walsh 0-1.	Referee: D O'Connor

== Championship statistics ==
=== Top scorers ===
Rank	Player	Club	Tally	Total	Matches	Average
1	Christy Clancy	St Catherine's	1-18	21	3	7.00
2	Bill Kearney	St Catherine's	3-02	11	3	3.66
3	John Murphy	St Catherine's	3-01	10	3	3.33
3	Seán Noonan	Aghabullogue	0-10	10	2	5.00
5	Eddie Forde	Douglas	2-02	8	1	8.00
5	Martin P. Buckley	Aghabullogue	2-02	8	2	4.00
