= Kieran Kingston =

Irish hurler and manager (born 1964)

Personal information
- Native name: Ciarán Mac Clochaire (Irish)
- Born: 9 September 1964 (age 62) Fountainstown, County Cork, Ireland
- Occupation: Bank official
- Height: 6 ft 0 in (183 cm)

Sport
- Sport: Hurling
- Position: Right corner-forward
Clubs
Years	Club	Apps (scores)
1982-1999 1982-1997	Tracton → Carrigdhoun	3 (0-09); 16 (5-30)
Club titles
- Cork titles: 0
Inter-county*
Years	County	Apps (scores)
1984-1990	Cork	9 (4-03)
Inter-county titles
- Munster titles: 2
- All-Irelands: 1
- NHL: 0
- All Stars: 0
- *Inter County team apps and scores correct as of 14:12, 22 November 2015.

Kieran Kingston (born 9 September 1964) is an Irish hurling manager and former player who managed the Cork senior hurling team between 2015 and 2022 (with a hiatus between 2017 and 2019), for which he previously lined out as a player. He spent much of his playing career as a forward.

Kingston began his hurling career at club level with Tracton. He broke onto the club's top adult team straight out of the minor grade in 1982. Kingston made 36 championship appearances and scored 17 goals for the club in a 17-year career that ended in 1999. During his time he was also earned regular inclusion on the Carrigdhoun divisional team.

Having never played minor hurling, Kingston began his inter-county career with the Cork under-21 team in 1983. After an unsuccessful tenure in this grade, he joined the Cork senior team for the 1984-85 season and made his last appearance as a substitute during the 1990 Munster Championship when injury effectively ended his career. In the interim, Kingston was part of the 1986 All-Ireland Championship-winning team and won two Munster Championship titles.

After being involved in team management and coaching in all grades at club level with Tracton, Kingston served as coach and selector with the Cork senior team under Jimmy Barry-Murphy. He subsequently succeeded Barry-Murphy as manager in 2015 and, after stepping down having served in the role for two seasons, was reappointed manager in 2019.

== Playing career ==
=== Tracton ===
Kingston joined the Tracton club at a young age and played in all grades at juvenile and underage levels before eventually joining the club's top adult team in the Cork Intermediate Championship. He made his first appearance for the team on 22 May 1982 when he lined out at right wing-forward in a 5-04 to 1-13 defeat by Inniscarra.

On 23 September 1990, Kingston was selected at centre-forward when Tracton faced St. Finbarr's in the final of the Cork Intermediate Championship. He scored two points from play but ended the game on the losing side following a 1-08 to 0-10 defeat.

Tracton qualified for a second successive Cork Intermediate Championship final on 24 August 1991, with Kingston lining out at left corner-forward. He scored 1-02 from play, including a last-minute goal, and collected a winners' medal following the 4-14 to 5-09 victory.

=== Cork ===
After being overlooked for the Cork minor team when he was eligible for the grade, Kingston first came to prominence on the inter-county scene as a member of the Cork under-21 team when he was added to the panel in advance of the 1983 Munster Championship. He made his first appearance for the team in a drawn first-round game with Waterford in April 1983, however, he enjoyed little success during his two seasons on the panel.

Kingston had just turned 20 when he was added to the Cork senior panel for the 1984–85 National League. He made his first senior appearance in November 1984 when he came on as a substitute in a 3-21 to 0-11 league defeat by Offaly. Kingston was retained on the panel for the subsequent Munster Championship. He was listed amongst the substitutes for Cork's seven-point semi-final win over Limerick, however, he failed to make the match-day panel for the Munster final defeat of Tipperary. On 4 August 1985, Kingston made his championship debut when he was a late addition to the starting fifteen for Cork's 4-12 to 5-05 All-Ireland semi-final defeat by Galway.

Kingston made a number of appearances during the 1985-86 National League, however, he failed to secure inclusion on any of the match-day panels during Cork's successful 1986 Munster Championship campaign. He earned a recall to the substitutes' bench for the All-Ireland semi-final win over Antrim, and was again named on the match-day panel for the All-Ireland final against Galway. Kingston was introduced as a substitute for midfielder John Fenton in the 4-13 to 2-15 victory.

Kingston became a starting fifteen regular during the 1986–87 National League, lining out in all eight of Cork's games. On 12 July 1987, he lined out in his first Munster final and scored a goal in the 1-18 apiece draw with Tipperary. Kingston was held scoreless in the subsequent replay defeat. After again making a number of appearances during the 1987–88 National League, a campaign which saw Cork relegated from Division 1, Kingston was consigned to the substitutes' bench for the 1988 Munster Championship. He made his only championship appearance in Cork's second successive 2-19 to 1-13 Munster final defeat by Tipperary.

In Cork's opening game on their return to Division 1 during the 1989–90 National League, Kingston suffered a career-threatening depressed fracture of his skull. The injury meant that he missed the rest of the league, but remained a member of the extended panel. In July 1990, Kingston was an unused substitute when Cork won the Munster Championship after a 4-16 to 2-14 win over Tipperary in the final. He failed to secure inclusion on the match-day panel for the All-Ireland final defeat of Galway, however, he still claimed a second winners' medal as a member of the extended panel.

== Managerial career ==
=== Tracton ===
Kingston has been heavily involved in coaching at all levels with Tracton over many years. In 2010 he was manager of the club's top team as Tracton reached the final of the intermediate championship. Ballymartle were the winners on that occasion on a scoreline of 2-13 to 0-11.

=== Cork ===
==== Selector and coach ====
On 1 September 2011, Kingston was one of four selectors named by new Cork senior hurling team manager Jimmy Barry-Murphy. His first season as part of the management team saw Cork qualify for the National League final on 6 May 2012, with the team suffering a 3-21 to 0-16 defeat by Kilkenny.

During Kingston's second season as a selector he helped guide the team to the Munster final on 14 July 2013, however, Cork suffered a 0-24 to 0-15 defeat by Limerick. On 8 September 2013, Cork drew 3-16 to 0-25 with Clare in their first All-Ireland final appearance in seven years. The replay on 28 September 2018 saw Cork suffered a 5-16 to 3-16 defeat.

Kingston was appointed coach of the team for the 2014 season while also retaining his role as a selector. On 13 July 2014, Cork enjoyed their first Munster Championship success in eight years when they defeated Limerick by 2-14 to 0-14 in the final. Kingston stepped down as coach and selector at the end of the season citing work commitments.

==== Manager ====
On 10 October 2015, Kingston returned to the Cork senior team as Jimmy Barry-Murphy's successor as manager. His first season at the helm saw Cork exit the championship after suffering their first defeat by Wexford in 60 years.

Kingston's second season saw more prominent roles for new players Shane Kingston, Mark Coleman and Darragh Fitzgibbon. On 9 July 2017, he guided Cork to the Munster Championship title after a 1-25 to 1-20 defeat of Clare in the final. After losing to Waterford in the All Ireland Semi Final Kingston stepped down as manager at the end of the season after declining an offer of a second term in charge.

==== Return as manager ====
On 1 October 2019, Kingston was ratified as manager of the Cork senior team for the second time. In 2020 Cork were beaten by Waterford in the Munster Championship and were subsequently knocked out of the Championship by Tipperary in the qualifiers. In August 2021, Cork qualified for the All-Ireland Final, their first final since 2013 after an extra time victory over Kilkenny in the semi final. Cork were comprehensively beaten by Limerick in the final.

In the 2022 Championship Kingston took Cork to an All Ireland Quarter Final appearance where Cork were narrowly beaten by Galway. In July 2022, Kingston stepped down as manager.

== Career statistics ==
=== As a player ===
==== Club ====
Team	Year	Cork IHC	
Team	Year	Apps	Score
Tracton	1982	1	0-00
Tracton	1983	1	2-00
Tracton	1984	1	1-03
Tracton	1985	2	1-03
Tracton	1986	3	1-09
Tracton	1987	1	0-05
Tracton	1988	2	1-01
Tracton	1989	4	0-10
Tracton	1990	4	0-04
Tracton	1991	4	3-04
Tracton	Total	23	9-39
Tracton	Year	Cork SHC	
Tracton	Year	Apps	Score
Tracton	1992	1	0-03
Tracton	1993	1	0-03
Tracton	1994	1	0-03
Tracton	Total	3	0-09
Tracton	Year	Cork IHC	
Tracton	Year	Apps	Score
Tracton	1995	1	0-03
Tracton	1996	1	1-04
Tracton	1997	3	3-08
Tracton	1998	3	0-02
Tracton	1999	2	4-03
Tracton	Total	10	8-20
Career total		36	17-68

==== Division ====
Team	Year	Cork SHC	
Team	Year	Apps	Score
Carrigdhoun	1983	1	0-00
Carrigdhoun	1984	1	0-00
Carrigdhoun	1985	2	1-06
Carrigdhoun	1986	3	1-06
Carrigdhoun	1987	1	1-00
Carrigdhoun	1988	2	1-06
Carrigdhoun	1989	1	0-02
Carrigdhoun	1990	1	0-06
Carrigdhoun	1991	1	0-02
Carrigdhoun	1992	0	0-00
Carrigdhoun	1993	0	0-00
Carrigdhoun	1994	0	0-00
Carrigdhoun	1995	1	0-02
Carrigdhoun	1996	1	1-00
Carrigdhoun	1997	1	0-00
Total		16	5-30

==== Inter-county ====
Team	Season	National League			Munster		All-Ireland		Total	
Team	Season	Division	Apps	Score	Apps	Score	Apps	Score	Apps	Score
Cork	1984-85	Division 1	3	0-00	0	0-00	1	1-00	4	1-00
Cork	1985-86	Division 1	4	2-01	0	0-00	1	0-00	5	2-01
Cork	1986-87	Division 1	8	2-15	4	3-01	—		12	5-16
Cork	1987-88	Division 1	5	1-04	1	0-00	—		6	1-04
Cork	1988-89	Division 2	6	0-06	1	0-00	—		7	0-06
Cork	1989-90	Division 1	1	0-01	1	0-02	0	0-00	2	0-03
Career total			27	5-27	7	3-03	2	1-00	36	9-30

=== As a manager ===
As of 13 June 2021

Managerial league-championship record by team and tenure
Team	From	To	Record				
Team	From	To	P	W	D	L	Win %
Cork	10 October 2015	23 September 2017	19	8	0	11	42.1
Cork	1 October 2019		13	5	1	7	38.5

== Honours ==
=== As a player ===
Tracton

- Cork Intermediate Hurling Championship (1): 1991

Cork

- All-Ireland Senior Hurling Championship (1): 1986
- Munster Senior Hurling Championship (2): 1986, 1990

=== In management ===
Cork

- Munster Senior Hurling Championship (2): 2014, 2017
- Munster Senior Hurling League (1): 2017

Sporting positions
Preceded by Jimmy Barry-Murphy	Cork Senior Hurling Manager; 2015–2017	Succeeded by John Meyler
Preceded by John Meyler	Cork Senior Hurling Manager; 2019–2022	Succeeded by Pat Ryan
