= Tullylease GAA =

Gaelic games club in County Cork, Ireland

Tullylease
- Tulach Leis
- County: Cork
- Colours: Red and white
- Grounds: Tullylease GAA Grounds

Playing kits
Standard colours

Tullylease GAA is a Gaelic Athletic Association club based in the village of Tullylease in the north-west of County Cork, Ireland which forms part of the parish of Milford, Freemount and Tullylease. The club plays in the Duhallow division and competes in both Hurling and Gaelic Football competitions. As of 2024, the club's football team competes in the Duhallow Junior C Football Championship. Tullylease has not fielded a hurling team since 2017.

Tullylease won the Duhallow Junior A Hurling League in 2009 and the Duhallow Junior A Hurling Championship in 2008 ending a baron run of 47 years in which Tullylease had been runners-up ten times. Tullylease lost to Diarmuid Ó Mathúna's in the 2008 semifinal of the Cork Junior Hurling Championship. In 2010, the club hosted the final of the Duhallow Junior A Hurling Championship for the first time.

In 2016, due to lack of numbers for multiple reasons, Tullylease joined with Lismire GAA. The club plays under Lismire's name in football and Tullylease's name in hurling. In 2016 they won the Duhallow Junior B Football Championship defeating Glenlara in the final.

== History ==
=== Beginnings ===
Gaelic games have been played in Tullylease since the early 1900s, the area better known as a Gaelic football stronghold. St Bericheart's became the name of the football club and competed in the Cork County Championship.

The area's hurlers played with fellow parishioners Milford up to the late 1930s. This amalgamation saw three North Cork titles in 1933, 1935 and 1936. With the set-up of the Duhallow division, Tullylease club came into existence, though falling numbers and rural decline saw the club disband and players transfer to Milford, Meelin or clubs outside the county at different levels.

=== 1940s ===
Tullylease qualified to their first Duhallow final and were awarded their first Duhallow JHC title, in 1945, without pucking a ball in the divisional final. Tullylease were awarded the title after opponents Newmarket turned up late, reportedly waiting for a driver before setting off on their journey.

=== 1950s ===
In 1952, a Tullylease and Freemount combination led to the formation of Allow Rovers. Competing in the Avondhu division, Rovers won the 1953 North Cork JBHC against Doneraile.

Tullylease GAA club won three divisional titles from 1958 to 1961. This era started with a return to the Duhallow final in 1957 after a 12-year absence. Tullylease were outsiders, facing three-in-a-row seeking Banteer. A late goal for Banteer to resulted in a replay. In the replay, Banteer scored six goals in the opening half to win by 9–7 to 2-2.

Tullylease strengthened their team with recruitments for the 1958 championship. Tullylease defeated Banteer in the semi-final to set up a tie with Kanturk in the final. Tullylease entered the divisional final as favourites and lived up to their rating to record a 4–4 to 0–3 victory.

From 1959, Tullylease saw off Castlemagner and Newmarket in their side of the draw. On the opposite side, Banteer had beaten Kilbrin only to be defeated by Kanturk in the semi-final. That resulted in a repeat of the previous season's final, which Tullylease won by 2–5 to 2–3.

=== 1990s ===
Tullylease continued to field hurling teams in junior b competitions. They won the 1990 and 1993 Duhallow Junior B Hurling Championship. 1990 marked the clubs first hurling championship in several years and done so by defeating Kilbrin 4–16 to 1-07. This success at divisional level helped Tullylease reach three county finals, unfortunately losing all three Cork Junior B Hurling Championship finals. These loses came in 1992, 1995, 1998.

=== 2008–2013 ===
The Tullylease hurling team had another successful spell in the late 2000s and early 2010s. Reaching three Duhallow finals in seven years, Tullylease won their most recent championship in 2008. They went on to defeat neighbours Charleville in the county championship.

=== 2013–2020 ===
After the 2013 final, Tullyleases impact in terms of competing for the title lessened. In 2016, Lismire agreed to transfer their hurlers to Tullylease in the hope of a more competitive amalgamated team in the championship.

In 2017 they won a couple of preliminary rounds reached the Duhallow semi-finals only to get hammered 5–30 to 1–10 by Kilbrin. This would be the last hurling match the club played to date. The footballers, however, continued to compete at junior b level.

=== 2020s ===
Despite their population challenges, Tullylease have still competed in divisional football competitions. In 2022, they were knocked out of the Duhallow Junior B Football Championship by St John's, before dropping down into the C championship, defeating Freemount in the final. This would be the last title the club has won to date.

In 2023, GAA President Larry McCarthy traced his ancestral roots to Tullylease on a visit to the area. Family ties linked in Tullylease saw his great-grandfather William Lenihan born during the height of the famine in 1847 in the townland of Ballinaguilla. Tullylease presented McCarthy with a "Lifetime Achievement" on serving as club chairman for close on 20 years and club delegate to the Duhallow Board for thirty years. A plaque was also unveiled to acknowledge a visit by McCarthy.

== Honours ==
- Duhallow Junior A Hurling Championship
  - (gold) Winners (5): 1945, 1958, 1959, 1961, 2008
  - (silver) Runners-Up (12): 1957, 1965, 1967, 1970, 1971, 1975, 1976, 1978, 1979, 1981, 2007, 2013
- Duhallow Junior A Hurling League
  - (gold) Winners (1): 2009
- Cork Junior B Hurling Championship
  - (silver) Runners-Up (3): 1992, 1995, 1998
- Duhallow Junior B Hurling Championship
  - (gold) Winners (2): 1990, 1993
- Duhallow Junior B Football Championship
  - (gold) Winners (1): 2003
- Duhallow Junior C Football Championship
  - (gold) Winners (1): 2022
