= Pat Buckley (Cork hurler) =

Retired Irish hurler from County Cork

Personal information
- Native name: Padraig Ó Buachalla (Irish)
- Born: 17 September 1965 (age 61) Milford, County Cork, Ireland
- Occupation: Computer operator
- Height: 5 ft 11 in (180 cm)

Sport
- Sport: Hurling
- Position: Midfield
Club
- Years: Club
- Milford
Club titles
- Cork titles: 0
Inter-county*
Years	County	Apps (scores)
1989-1995	Cork	16 (0-9)
Inter-county titles
- Munster titles: 2
- All-Irelands: 1
- NHL: 1
- All Stars: 0
- *Inter County team apps and scores correct as of 22:23, 17 May 2015.

Patrick Buckley (born 17 September 1965) is an Irish former hurler who played as a midfielder for the Cork senior team.

Born in Milford, County Cork, Buckley first arrived on the inter-county scene at the age of seventeen when he first linked up with the Cork minor team, before later joining the under-21 side. He made his senior debut during the 1989 championship. Buckley immediately became a regular member of the starting fifteen and won two Munster medals and one National Hurling League medal. He was an All-Ireland runner-up on one occasion.

As a member of the Munster inter-provincial team on a number of occasions, Buckley won one Railway Cup medal as a non-playing substitute. At club level Buckley played with Milford.

Throughout his career Buckley made 16 championship appearances. His retirement came following the conclusion of the 1995 championship.

In retirement from playing Buckley became involved in team management and coaching. He was a selector with the Cork senior team under Denis Walsh and also at club level with Charleville.

== Playing career ==
=== Inter-county ===
Buckley first played for Cork as a member of the minor team on 11 May 1983 in a narrow 2-13 to 1-15 Munster semi-final defeat by Limerick. He later spent two years as a member of the Cork under-21 team.

On 4 June 1989, Buckley made his senior championship debut in an 0-18 apiece Munster semi-final draw with Waterford.

In 1990 Cork bounced back after a period in decline. Buckley won his first Munster medal that year following a 4-16 to 2-14 defeat of Tipperary. Buckley was dropped from the starting fifteen for the subsequent All-Ireland final on 2 September 1990. Galway provided the opposition and justified their favourites tag by going seven points ahead in the opening thirty-five minutes thanks to a masterful display by Joe Cooney. Cork fought back with an equally expert display by captain Tomás Mulcahy. The game was effectively decided on an incident which occurred midway through the second half when Cork goalkeeper Ger Cunningham blocked a point-blank shot from Martin Naughton with his nose. The umpires gave no 65-metre free, even though he clearly deflected it out wide. Cork went on to win a high-scoring and open game of hurling by 5–15 to 2–21. Buckley collected an All-Ireland medal as a non-playing substitute.

Cork surrendered their titles in 1991, however, Buckley claimed a second Munster medal in 1992 following a 1-22 to 3-11 of Limerick. On 6 September 1992 Cork faced Kilkenny in the All-Ireland decider. At half-time Cork were two points ahead, however, two second-half goals by John Power and Michael "Titch" Phelan supplemented a first-half D. J. Carey penalty which gave Kilkenny a 3-10 to 1-12 victory.

Buckley won a National Hurling League medal in 1993 following a 3-11 to 1-12 defeat of Wexford.

Cork's hurling fortunes took a downturn over the next few years and Buckley retired from inter-county hurling following Cork's exit from the 1995 championship.

== Honours ==
=== Player ===
Cork

- All-Ireland Senior Hurling Championship (1): 1990 (sub)
- Munster Senior Hurling Championship (2): 1990, 1992
- National Hurling League (1): 1992–93

Munster

- Railway Cup (1): 1992 (sub)
