= 1994 Cork Intermediate Hurling Championship =

Irish hurling competition

- Dates: 12 June 1994 – 11 September 1994
- Teams: 25
- Champions: St. Catherine's (1st title); Patsy O'Donoghue (captain); Pa Finn (manager)
- Runners-up: Cloughduv; Kevin Murray (captain)

Tournament statistics
- Matches played: 24
- Goals scored: 86 (3.58 per match)
- Points scored: 540 (22.5 per match)
- Top scorer(s): Christy Clancy (2-34)

The 1994 Cork Intermediate Hurling Championship was the 85th staging of the Cork Intermediate Hurling Championship since its establishment by the Cork County Board in 1909. The draw for the opening round fixtures took place on 12 December 1993. The championship began on 12 June 1994 and ended on 11 September 1994.

On 11 September 1994, St. Catherine's won the championship following a 3–12 to 2–11 defeat of Cloughduv in the final at Páirc Uí Chaoimh. This was their first ever championship title.

St. Catherines' Christy Clancy was the championship's top scorer with 2-34.

== Team changes ==
=== From Championship ===
Promoted to the Cork Senior Hurling Championship

- Youghal

=== To Championship ===
Regraded from the Cork Senior Hurling Championship

- Valley Rovers

Promoted from the Cork Junior A Hurling Championship

- Blarney

== Results ==
=== First round ===
| 12 June 1994 First round | Valley Rovers | 1-11 - 2-16 | Delanys | Ted Hanley Memorial Park |
| | D Kiely 0-6, M Cronin 1-0, A Crowley 0-3, C O'Donovan 0-1, D Crowley 0-1. | | M McElhinney 1-2, G Healy 1-1, K Egan 0-4, B Egan 0-4, G McAuliffe 0-2, C Titley 0-2, M O'Neill 0-1. |

| 12 June 1994 First round | Midleton | 1-15 - 2-06 | Ballymartle | Church Road |
| | M Carlton 0-5, K Hennessy 0-5, V O'Neill 1-1, M O'Mahony 0-2, D O'Brien 0-1, B Cotter 0-1. | | M Allan 1-1, A McCarthy 1-1, P Coughlan 0-2, P Deasy 0-1, J O'Mahony 0-1. |

| 8 July 1994 First round | Cobh | 2-12 - 1-13 | Aghada | Ballymacoda |
| | R Meaney 0-9, D Barrett 1-1, T Anderson 1-0, M Daly 0-1, M Meaney 0-1. | | R Lewis 0-9, K O'Keeffe 1-0, N Falvey 0-2, M Lewis 0-1, C Counihan 0-1. |

| 8 July 1994 First round | Kilbrittain | 1-13 - 0-09 | Na Piarsaigh | Minane Bridge |
| | D O'Connell 0-6, T Brennan 0-4, T McCarthy 1-0, P Harrington 0-1, E Sheehy 0-1, F O'Mahony 0-1. | | M McSweeney 0-5, C O'Reilly 0-2, S O'Mahony 0-1, P Kelleher 0-1. |

| 8 July 1994 First round | Newcestown | 1-21 - 2-05 | Newtownshandrum | Millstreet |
| | P Kenneally 0-12, P Condon 1-1, D Long 0-4, E Desmond 0-2, M O'Mahony 0-1, D McCarthy 0-1. | | J Coughlan 1-3, J Ryan 1-0, I Kelleher 0-1, M Reidy 0-1. |

| 9 July 1994 First round | Blarney | 2-07 - 0-16 | Inniscarra | Páirc Uí Chaoimh |
| | F Coleman 1-1, P Barry 1-0, A Murphy 0-3, S O'Donoghue 0-2, B Sheehan 0-1. | | S Holland 0-7, D Hennessy 0-3, D Holland 0-2, G O'Mahony 0-1, C Holland 0-1, P Maher 0-1, M McDonnell 0-1. |

| 9 July 1994 First round | Ballincollig | 1-10 - 3-11 | Éire Óg | Páirc Uí Chaoimh |
| | J Dwyer 1-4, F O'Callaghan 0-2, P Twomey 0-2, D Beale 0-1, P O'Mahony 0-1. | | C O'Leary 1-3, C Óg Sheehan 1-1, P Bradley 1-0, M Healy 0-3, K Sheehan 0-3, M Sheehan 0-1. |

| 10 July 1994 First round | Glen Rovers | 1-09 - 5-10 | St. Catherine's | Bride Rovers Park |
| | D Whitley 1-2, C Buckley 0-2, D Goggin 0-1, C Walsh 0-1, C O'Halloran 0-1, K O'Neill 0-1, B O'Connell 0-1. | | M Walsh 3-2, C Clancy 0-4, J Sheehan 1-0, B Cotter 1-0, K Morrisson 0-3, E Geaney 0-1. |

| 10 July 1994 First round | Bishopstown | 0-10 - 1-12 | Cloyne | Páirc Uí Chonaill |
| | S Murphy 0-6, E Ó Súilleabháin 0-2, N Crowley 0-1, M O'Rourke 0-1. | | D Óg Cusack 0-6, G Lewis 1-1, A O'Brien 0-3, P Cahill 0-1, M Cahill 0-1. |

=== Second round ===
| 2 July 1994 Second round | St. Vincent's | 2-08 - 1-08 | Blackrock | Douglas |
| | W Leahy 1-3, P Horgan 1-1, J Gould 0-2, D Murphy 0-2. | | J O'Flynn 1-6, D Downey 0-1, B Murphy 0-1. |

| 8 July 1994 Second round | Douglas | 1-08 - 1-09 | Aghabullogue | Ballincollig |
| | J Quirke 1-0, M Cronin 0-3, M Barry 0-2, E Sharkey 0-1, T O'Flynn 0-1, E O'Donovan 0-1. | | J Foley 0-5, J Healy 0-4, M Healy 1-0. |

| 15 July 1994 Second round | Cloughduv | 4-13 - 3-14 | St. Finbarr's | Ballinhassig |
| | K Murray 2-3, T Barry-Murphy 0-6, T O'Riordan 1-0, T O'Mahony 1-0, J Grainger 0-2, L Dromey 0-1, J Hall 0-1. | | P Forde 1-5, F Lehane 0-8, K Kelleher 1-1, K McTiernan 1-0. |

| 22 July 1994 Second round | Éire Óg | 0-10 - 1-05 | Newcestown | Ballinhassig |
| | C O'Leary 0-4, M Sheehan 0-2, P Bradley 0-1, M Healy 0-1, K Sheehan 0-1, C Óg Sheehan 0-1. | | D Wilson 1-0, P Kenneally 0-2, D Long 0-2, E Kenneally 0-1. |

| 22 July 1994 Second round | Delanys | 1-13 - 0-08 | Inniscarra | Páirc Uí Rinn |
| | B Egan 0-9, M McElhinney 1-1, G McAuliffe 0-1, K Egan 0-1, G Healy 0-1. | | S Holland 0-5, P Maher 0-1, R Maher 0-1, M O'Regan 0-1. |

| 23 July 1994 Second round | Kilbrittain | 1-11 - 2-13 | Cobh | Páirc Uí Chaoimh |
| | D O'Connell 0-6, T McCarthy 1-0, T Brennan 0-2, J O'Connell 0-1, M Holland 0-1, P Harrington 0-1. | | R Meaney 0-10, D Meaney 1-2, J Butler 1-0, D Barrett 0-1. |

| 23 July 1994 Second round | Cloyne | 2-09 - 3-14 | Mallow | St. Catherine's Park |
| | G Lewis 1-1, D Óg Cusack 0-4, M Lynch 1-0, M Cahill 0-1, A O'Brien 0-1, Philip Cahill 0-1, D Motherway 0-1. | | R Sheehan 3-10, T O'Riordan 0-3, J Walsh 0-1. |

| 29 July 1994 Second round | St. Catherine's | 3-09 - 2-06 | Midleton | Youghal |
| | C Clancy 1-3, D O'Leary 1-2, M O'Keeffe 1-0, K Morrisson 0-3, M Walsh 0-1. | | K Hennessy 2-1, M Carlton 0-4, M O'Mahony 0-1. |

=== Quarter-finals ===
| 31 July 1994 Quarter-final | Delanys | 6-22 - 2-14 | Éire Óg | Páirc Uí Chaoimh |
| | M McElhinney 5-2, K Egan 0-7, B Egan 0-6, D McElhinney 1-0, G Healy 0-3, G McAuliffe 0-2, M O'Neill 0-1, D Power 0-1. | | M Sheehan 1-5, C Óg Sheehan 1-3, K Sheehan 0-3, C O'Leary 0-2, K Murray 0-1. |

| 6 August 1994 Quarter-final | Aghabullogue | 2-10 - 1-09 | St. Vincent's | Blarney |
| | T Tarrant 2-1, J Healy 0-7, P Martin 0-1, J Foley 0-1. | | J Daly 1-3, W Leahy 0-5, G O'Connor 0-1. |

| 7 August 1994 Quarter-final | St. Catherine's | 2-18 - 4-10 | Cobh | Páirc Shéamuis de Barra |
| | C Clancy 1-13, B Cotter 1-1, D O'Leary 0-3, M Walsh 0-1. | | R Meaney 2-3, D Barrett 1-1, J Butler 1-0, G Morgan 0-2, G Devlin 0-1, M Meaney 0-1, M Walker 0-1, A Leahy 0-1. |

| 20 August 1994 Quarter-final | Cloughduv | 3-11 - 1-07 | Mallow | Páirc Uí Rinn |
| | T Barry-Murphy 2-5, L Lynch 1-0, K Murray 0-3, D Slyne 0-2, T O'Mahony 0-1. | | R O'Connell 1-4, A Aherne 0-2, S Murphy 0-1, R Sheehan 0-1. |

=== Semi-finals ===
| 21 August 1994 Semi-final | St. Catherine's | 3-16 - 2-15 | Delanys | Páirc Uí Chaoimh |
| | C Clancy 0-7, D O'Leary 2-0, D O'Connell 1-1, J Sheehan 0-3, K Morrisson 0-2, B Cotter 0-1, D Walsh 0-1, S Neville 0-1. | | B Egan 1-2, D Power 1-0, M McElhinney 0-3, D McElhinney 0-3, K Egan 0-3, G Healy 0-2, M O'Neill 0-1. |

| 27 August 1994 Semi-final | Cloughduv | 2-12 - 0-09 | Aghabullogue | Ballincollig |
| | T Barry-Murphy 0-7, K Murray 1-2, T O'Mahony 1-0, P Murray 0-1, D Slyne 0-1, L Dromey 0-1. | | J Healy 0-5, M Walsh 0-1, D O'Connell 0-1, M Healy 0-1, P Martin 0-1. |

=== Final ===
| 11 September 1994 Final | St. Catherine's | 3-12 - 2-11 | Cloughduv | Páirc Uí Chaoimh |
| | B Cotter 2-1, C Clancy 0-7, D O'Connell 1-0, K Morrison 0-3, J Sheehan 0-1, D O'Leary 0-1. | | K Murray 2-4, T Barry-Murphy 0-5, L Lynch 0-1, L Dromey 0-1. |

== Championship statistics ==
=== Top scorers ===
Overall

| Rank | Player | Club | Tally | Total | Matches | Average |
|---|---|---|---|---|---|---|
| 1 | Christy Clancy | St. Catherine's | 2-34 | 40 | 5 | 8.00 |
| 2 | Mark McElhinney | Delanys | 7-08 | 29 | 4 | 7.25 |
| 2 | Tim Barry-Murphy | Cloughduv | 2-23 | 29 | 4 | 7.25 |
| 4 | Kevin Murray | Cloughduv | 5-13 | 28 | 5 | 5.60 |
| 4 | Richard Meaney | Cobh | 2-22 | 28 | 3 | 9.33 |
| 6 | Barry Egan | Delanys | 1-21 | 24 | 4 | 6.00 |
| 7 | Ronan Sheehan | Mallow | 3-11 | 20 | 2 | 10.00 |
| 8 | Brian Cotter | St. Catherine's | 4-04 | 16 | 5 | 3.20 |
| 8 | Joe Healy | AGhabullogue | 0-16 | 16 | 3 | 5.33 |
| 10 | Kevin Egan | Delanys | 0-15 | 15 | 4 | 3.75 |

In a single game

| Rank | Player | Club | Tally | Total | Opposition |
|---|---|---|---|---|---|
| 1 | Ronan Sheehan | Mallow | 3-10 | 19 | Cloyne |
| 2 | Mark McElhinney | Delanys | 5-02 | 17 | Éire Óg |
| 3 | Christy Clancy | St. Catherine's | 1-13 | 16 | Cobh |
| 4 | Pat Kenneally | Newcestown | 0-12 | 12 | Newtownshandrum |
| 5 | Christy Clancy | St. Catherine's | 3-02 | 11 | Glen Rovers |
| 5 | Tim Barry-Murphy | Cloughduv | 2-05 | 11 | Mallow |
| 7 | Kevin Murray | Cloughduv | 2-04 | 10 | St. Catherine's |
| 7 | Richard Meaney | Cobh | 0-10 | 10 | Kilbrittain |
| 9 | Kevin Murray | Cloughduv | 2-03 | 9 | St. Finbarr's |
| 9 | Richard Meaney | Cobh | 2-03 | 9 | St. Catherine's |
| 9 | John O'Flynn | Blackrock | 1-06 | 9 | St. Vincent's |
| 9 | Richard Meaney | Cobh | 0-09 | 9 | Aghada |
| 9 | Richie Lewis | Aghada | 0-09 | 9 | Cobh |
| 9 | Barry Egan | Delanys | 0-09 | 9 | Inniscarra |
