= Seán O'Gorman =

Irish hurler

Personal information
- Native name: Seán Ó Gormáin (Irish)
- Born: 26 May 1960 (age 66) Milford, County Cork, Ireland
- Occupation: Primary school principal
- Height: 5 ft 11 in (180 cm)

Sport
- Sport: Hurling
- Position: Right corner-back
Clubs
- Years: Club
- Milford; Avondhu
Club titles
- Cork titles: 0
Inter-county*
Years	County	Apps (scores)
1979-1995	Cork	16 (0-3)
Inter-county titles
- Munster titles: 2
- All-Irelands: 1
- NHL: 1
- All Stars: 2
- *Inter County team apps and scores correct as of 12:42, 4 July 2015.

Seán O'Gorman (born 26 May 1960) is an Irish former hurler who played as a right corner-back for the Cork senior team.

Born in Milford, County Cork, O'Gorman first arrived on the inter-county scene at the age of seventeen when he first linked up with the Cork minor team before later joining the under-21 and junior sides. He made his senior debut during the 1879-80 league. O'Gorman immediately became a regular member of the starting fifteen and won one All-Ireland medal, two Munster medals and one National Hurling League medal. He was an All-Ireland runner-up on one occasion.

As a member of the Munster inter-provincial team on a number of occasions, O'Gorman never won a Railway Cup medal. At club level he won several championship medals in all grades with Milford, while he also lined out with divisional side Avondhu.

Throughout his career O'Gorman made 16 championship appearances. His retirement came following the conclusion of the 1995 championship.

In retirement from playing O'Gorman became involved in team management and coaching. At club level he has guided Kilbrin to several divisional championship titles.

O'Gorman is regarded as one of Cork's best players of his era. During his playing days he won two All-Star awards. O'Gorman was also chosen as one of the 25 best Cork players of the past 25 years in a 2013 poll.

== Playing career ==
=== Club ===
After enjoying championship success in the under-21 grade with Milford, O'Gorman quickly joined the club's top team. After annexing the North Cork junior championship title, Milford subsequently faced St. Catherine's in the county decider. A 1–10 to 0–11 victory gave O'Gorman a Cork Junior Hurling Championship medal.

Milford's great run of success continued in 1982. A 4–7 to 1–6 defeat of Erin's Own gave O'Gorman a championship medal in the intermediate grade.

=== Minor, under-21 and junior ===
O'Gorman first played for Cork as a member of the minor team on 10 July 1977. He was at full-forward and scored five points in Cork's narrow 2–8 to 2–7 defeat of Limerick. It was his first Munster medal. Kilkenny provided the opposition in the subsequent All-Ireland decider on 4 September 1977. A late point by Pat Hartnett secured a 3–11 to 4–8 draw. The replay on 9 October 1977 was also a close affair, however, Cork lost out by 1–8 to 0–9.

Cork retained the provincial title in 1978, with O'Gorman winning a second Munster medal following a narrow 1–14 to 3–6 defeat of Tipperary. For the second year in succession Kilkenny provided the opposition in the All-Ireland decider on 3 September 1978. O'Gorman bagged 1–1 in that game and collected an All-Ireland Minor Hurling Championship medal following a 1–15 to 1–8 victory.

O'Gorman subsequently joined the Cork under-21 team, playing at that grade for three years.

By 1983 O'Gorman had joined the Cork junior team. After missing out on the provincial campaign he was at full-forward for the All-Ireland decider against Galway on 25 September 1983. A 3014 to 2–15 victory gave O'Gorman an All-Ireland medal.

=== Senior ===
O'Gorman made his senior debut with Cork in a National Hurling League defeat by Tipperary on 18 November 1979. He was a regular in the league over the next few years and was added to the championship panel in 1982. He was a Munster medallist as a non-playing substitute that year, however, Cork were subsequently defeated by Kilkenny in the All-Ireland decider.

As an unused substitute once again in 1983, O'Gorman added a second Munster medal to his collection following a defeat of Waterford, however, Cork were once again defeated by Kilkenny in the All-Ireland final.

O'Gorman was a member of the extended panel once again in 1984. He was at left wing-back on the Cork team that defeated Laois by 2–21 to 1–9 to take the special Centenary Cup. He was confined to the substitutes' bench again for the championship campaign. He won a third successive Munster medal as a non-playing substitute following a defeat of Tipperary in a classic provincial decider. O'Gorman failed to make the match day panel for Cork's subsequent All-Ireland final defeat of Offaly.

In 1985 O'Gorman added a fourth successive Munster medal as a non-playing substitute to his collection as Cork defeated Tipperary by 4–17 to 4–11 in the provincial decider once again.

After being dropped from the panel in 1986, O'Gorman made his championship debut on 28 June 1987 in a 3–14 to 0-10 Munster semi-final replay defeat of Limerick.

By 1990 O'Gorman was a regular member of the starting fifteen. He won his first Munster medal on the field of play that year following a 4–16 to 2–14 defeat of Tipperary. The subsequent All-Ireland final on 2 September 1990 pitted Cork against Galway for the second time in four years. Galway were once again the red-hot favourites and justified this tag by going seven points ahead in the opening thirty-five minutes thanks to a masterful display by Joe Cooney. Cork fought back with an equally expert display by captain Tomás Mulcahy. The game was effectively decided on an incident which occurred midway through the second half when Cork goalkeeper Ger Cunningham blocked a point-blank shot from Martin Naughton with his nose. The umpires gave no 65-metre free, even though he clearly deflected it out wide. Cork went on to win a high-scoring and open game of hurling by 5–15 to 2–21. As well as winning a first All-Ireland medal O'Gorman was later presented with an All-Star.

Cork surrendered their titles in 1991, however, O'Gorman claimed his second Munster medal on the field in 1992 following a 1–22 to 3-11 of Limerick. On 6 September 1992 Cork faced Kilkenny in the All-Ireland decider. At half-time Cork were two points ahead, however, two second-half goals by John Power and Michael "Titch" Phelan supplemented a first-half D. J. Carey penalty which gave Kilkenny a 3–10 to 1–12 victory.

O'Gorman won a National Hurling League medal in 1993 following a 3–11 to 1–12 defeat of Wexford.

After unsuccessful championship campaigns over the following two years, O'Gorman was dropped from the starting fifteen in 1995. He retired from inter-county hurling following Cork's exit from the championship that year.

=== Inter-provincial ===
O'Gorman was first picked for the Munster inter-provincial team in 1991. He was an unused substitute as an all-Galway Connacht team defeated Munster by 1–13 to 0–12 in the decider.

In 1993 and 1994 O'Gorman was a regular member of the starting fifteen, however, Munster's campaign in both years ended at the semi-final stage.

== Coaching career ==
In 2011 O'Gorman joined the management team of the Kilbrin junior team. Over the course of the next three years he helped guide the team to three successive divisional titles. After taking a break in 2014 he returned as manager of the team in 2015.

== Honours ==
=== Player ===
Milford

- Cork Intermediate Hurling Championship (1): 1982
- Cork Junior Hurling Championship (1): 1981
- Cork Under-21 Hurling Championship (1): 1978
- North Cork Junior Hurling Championship (1): 1981
- North Cork Junior Football Championship (2): 1981, 1991

Cork

- All-Ireland Senior Hurling Championship (2): 1984 (sub), 1990
- Munster Senior Hurling Championship (6): 1982 (sub), 1983 (sub), 1984 (sub), 1985 (sub), 1990, 1992
- National Hurling League (1): 1992-93
- Centenary Cup (1): 1984
- All-Ireland Junior Hurling Championship (1): 1983
- Munster Junior Hurling Championship (1): 1983 (sub)
- All-Ireland Minor Hurling Championship (1): 1978
- Munster Minor Hurling Championship (2): 1977, 1978

=== Coach ===
Kilbrin

- Duhallow Junior A Hurling Championship (3): 2011, 2012, 2013

=== Individual ===
Honours

- All-Star (2): 1990, 1993
