= 1999 Cork Intermediate Hurling Championship =

Irish hurling competition

- Dates: 18 June 1999 – 21 November 1999
- Teams: 25
- Sponsor: TSB Bank
- Champions: Ballincollig (7th title); Dan Murphy (captain); Justin McCarthy (manager)
- Runners-up: Blarney

Tournament statistics
- Matches played: 26
- Goals scored: 94 (3.62 per match)
- Points scored: 516 (19.85 per match)
- Top scorer(s): Podsie O'Mahony (3-24)

The 1999 Cork Intermediate Hurling Championship was the 90th staging of the Cork Intermediate Hurling Championship since its establishment by the Cork County Board in 1909. The draw for the opening fixtures took place on 11 December 1998. The championship began on 18 June 1999 and ended on 21 November 1999. It was the last championship to be played using a straight knock-out format.

On 21 November 1999, Ballincollig won the championship after a 1–14 to 2–09 defeat of Blarney in the final at Páirc Uí Chaoimh. It was their seventh championship title overall and their first title since 1967.

Ballincollig's Podsie O'Mahony was the championship's top score wit 3-24.

== Team changes ==
=== From Championship ===
Promoted to the Cork Senior Hurling Championship

- Castlelyons

=== To Championship ===
Promoted from the Cork Junior A Hurling Championship

- Bride Rovers

== Results ==
=== First round ===
| 18 June 1999 First round | Newcestown | 1-09 - 3-14 | Tracton | Ballinhassig |
| | P Crowley 0-4, E O'Donovan 1-0, K O'Sullivan 0-3, P Dineen 0-1, N Crowley 0-1. | | K Kingston 2-3, M Quinn 1-1, F Walsh 0-4, DJ Kiely 0-3, P Murphy 0-1, J Kingston 0-1, F Lynch 0-1. |

| 20 June 1999 First round | Aghabullogue | 1-13 - 3-09 | Ballymartle | Blarney |
| | D O'Leary 1-6, D Murphy 0-2, P O'Rourke 0-2, D Twomey 0-2, J FOley 0-1. | | G Cummins 1-5, R Dwyer 1-2, P Deasy 1-1, A McCarthy 0-1. |

| 20 June 1999 First round | Cloughduv | 1-08 - 2-09 | St. Finbarr's | Páirc Liam Mhic Cárthaigh |
| | K Murray 1-6, J O'Leary 0-1, P Dunlea 0-1. | | K McTiernan 2-2, F Lehane 0-4, N Hosford 0-1, E Griffin 0-1, A Furey 0-1. |

| 20 June 1999 First round | Cobh | 1-12 - 1-11 | Delanys | Páirc Lios gCúl |
| | G Morgan 0-8, M Daly 1-2, B Meaney 0-1, P Looney 0-1. | | D Quinlan 0-4, D Power 1-0, M McElhinney 0-2, K Egan 0-2, G Healy 0-2, J O'Driscoll 0-1. |

| 26 June 1999 First round | Douglas | 1-16 - 3-07 | Éire Óg | Ballincollig |
| | T Twomey 0-9, R Gunn 1-1, P Boyle 0-2, P Barry 0-1, O Coveney 0-1, G Wade 0-1, G McLoughlin 0-1. | | T Cronin 1-3, M Sheehan 1-2, K Murphy 1-0, K Sheehan 0-2. |

| 26 June 1999 First round | Glen Rovers | 2-12 - 2-12 | Argideen Rangers | Riverstick |
| | B O'Connell 0-6, C Buckley 1-2, S Kennefick 1-2, L Lynch 0-1, G Calnan 0-1. | | M Walsh 1-8, J Crowley 0-2, T Crowley 0-1, M O'Callaghan 0-1. |

| 27 June 1999 First round | St. Vincent's | 0-09 - 1-11 | Aghada | Cloughduv |
| | D Murphy 0-6, D Callaghan 0-2, J Buckley 0-1. | | R Lewis 0-6, G O'Brien 1-0, D Creedon 0-3, C Counihan 0-1, P Kilbane 0-1. |

| 27 June 1999 First round | Bride Rovers | 1-11 - 2-07 | Milford | Mill Field |
| | T Broderick 1-2, J O'Driscoll 0-5, Brian Murphy 0-2, R Cahill 0-1, J O'Dowd 0-1. | | M Morrissey 1-5, S O'Gorman 1-0, R Geary 0-1, S Curtin 0-1. |

| 27 June 1999 First round | Inniscarra | 2-03 - 1-10 | Blarney | Cloughduv |
| | P O'Riordan 1-0, T Murray 1-0, J Olden 0-1, S Holland 0-1, D O'Leary 0-1. | | A Shanahan 0-7, D McSweeney 1-0, R McNamara 0-2, S O'Donoghue 0-1. |

| 11 July 1999 First round replay | Glen Rovers | 4-09 - 3-09 | Argideen Rangers | Riverstick |
| | C Buckley 1-1, L Lynch 1-1, S Kennefick 0-4, B Wall 1-0, J Coughlan 1-0, T Chisolm 0-3. | | M Foley 2-1, A O'Leary 1-0, M Walsh 0-3, B Hennessy 0-2, T Crowley 0-2, B Harte 0-1. |

=== Second round ===
| 18 June 1999 Second round | Na Piarsaigh | 1-14 - 0-11 | Carrigtwohill | Mayfield |
| | M Mullins 1-4, D Gardiner 0-3, Mark O'Sullivan 0-2, R Sweeney 0-2, G Fitzgerald 0-2, R Healy 0-1. | | N McCarthy 0-5, M Fitzgerald 0-4, J O'Connor 0-1, S O'Farrell 0-1. |

| 20 June 1999 Second round | Valley Rovers | 1-10 - 2-06 | Killeagh | Blarney |
| | J Hurley 1-1, R O'Donovan 0-4, A Newman 0-2, J Burke 0-1, M Kelleher 0-1. | | J Deane 2-4, L Collins 0-1, K Scully 0-1. |

| 10 July 1999 Second round | Ballymartle | 2-22 - 4-05 | Tracton | Carrigaline |
| | G Cummins 0-9, M Allen 1-4, R Dwyer 0-6, J Tobin 1-0, K Lordan 0-2, A McCarthy 0-1. | | K Kingston 2-0, J Quinn 1-0, F Lynch 1-0, DJ Kiely 0-2, J Kingston 0-1, P Murphy 0-1, M Quinn 0-1. |

| 25 July 1999 Second round | Bride Rovers | 2-06 - 3-09 | Douglas | Watergrasshill |
| | J O'Driscoll 1-2, P Murphy 1-0, B Murphy 0-2, R Cahill 0-1, T Broderick 0-1. | | R O'Hara 3-1, T Twomey 0-3, P Barry 0-2, G Wade 0-1, K Hogan 0-1, G McLoughlin 0-1. |

| 25 July 1999 Second round | Blarney | 2-10 - 0-10 | St. Finbarr's | Ballincollig |
| | E McCarthy 1-2, D McSweeney 1-0, A Shanahan 0-3, R McNamara 0-2, D O'Donovan 0-1, S O'Donovan 0-1, J Hurley 0-1. | | F Lehane 0-3, B O'Shea 0-2, J McCarthy 0-2, S McCarthy 0-2, K Murphy 0-1. |

| 25 July 1999 Second round | Cobh | 3-11 - 2-12 | Youghal | Rostellan |
| | B Meaney 1-2, R Meaney 1-0, D Meaney 1-0, G Morgan 0-3, D Barrett 0-2, V O'Rourke 0-1, M Daly 0-1, O O'Connor 0-1, P Meaney 0-1. | | D Coleman 0-5, T Coyne 1-0, O O'Brien 1-0, M Ó Laochdha 0-2, M Walsh 0-1, B Hogan 0-1, JP Joyce 0-1, B Coleman 0-1, P Coyne 0-1. |

| 25 July 1999 Second round | Ballincollig | 3-10 - 2-11 | Mallow |
| | G O'Connell 2-0, P O'Mahony 1-3, D Murphy 0-3, D Beale 0-3, T O'Leary 0-1. | | R O'Connell 1-8, N Dineen 1-0, T O'Riordan 0-1, F McCormack 0-1, R Sheehan 0-1. |

| 7 August 1999 Second round | Aghada | 1-17 - 3-08 | Glen Rovers | Cloyne |
| | R Lewis 1-5, D Creedon 0-3, K O'Keeffe 0-2, D Devoy 0-2, V Morrissey 0-2, A Devoy 0-1, R Dwane 0-1, G Melvin 0-1. | | B O'Connell 2-1, B Corcoran 1-0, C Buckley 0-3, L Lynch 0-2, K Lynam 0-1, G O'Connor 0-1. |

=== Quarter-finals ===
| 17 July 1999 Quarter-final | Valley Rovers | 1-17 - 2-04 | Na Piarsaigh | Minane Bridge |
| | R O'Donovan 0-7, C O'Donovan 1-2, J Hurley 0-4, T Burke 0-2, N McCarthy 0-2. | | D O'Sullivan 1-0, M O'Sullivan 1-0, M Mullins 0-2, G Shaw 0-1, D Gardiner 0-1. |

| 7 August 1999 Quarter-final | Douglas | 4-17 - 2-08 | Ballymartle | Shanbally |
| | T Twomey 2-9, G McLoughlin 1-2, K Hogan 1-0, B Boyle 0-2, D Twohig 0-2, A Larkin 0-1, W Coveney 0-1. | | G Cummins 1-3, M Allen 1-1, P Coughlan 0-2, P Deasy 0-1, C Sheehan 0-1. |

| 28 August 1999 Quarter-final | Blarney | 1-10 - 1-10 | Aghada | Páirc Uí Rinn |
| | A Shanahan 0-6, R McNamara 1-0, J Hughes 0-1, B Sheehan 0-1, D McSweeney 0-1, S O'Donoghue 0-1. | | R Lewis 0-6, C Counihan 1-0, D Creedon 0-2, M Lewis 0-1, V Morrissey 0-1. |

| 18 September 1999 Quarter-final replay | Blarney | 1-12 - 1-07 | Aghada | Rathcormack |
| | R McNamara 1-3, J Hurley 0-3, J Downey 0-2, R O'Sullivan 0-1, D McSweeney 0-1, T Harrington 0-1, A Shanahan 0-1. | | R Lewis 1-4, R Dwane 0-2, C Counihan 0-1. |

| 24 October 1999 Quarter-final | Ballincollig | 3-17 - 2-10 | Cobh | Páirc Uí Rinn |
| | P O'Mahony 1-10, A Beale 1-2, G O'Connell 1-1, D Murphy 0-1, T Beale 0-1, T O'Leary 0-1, R O'Doherty 0-1. | | G Morgan 1-2, R Meaney 1-2, M Daly 0-2, B Meaney 0-2, P Meaney 0-1, D Barrett 0-1. |

=== Semi-finals ===
| 3 October 1999 Semi-final | Blarney | 1-10 - 0-10 | Douglas | Church Road |
| | J Hurley 1-0, R McNamara 0-3, A Shanahan 0-3, B Sheehan 0-1, S O'Donoghue 0-1, E McCarthy 0-1, J Hughes 0-1. | | T Twomey 0-3, G Wade 0-3, R O'Hara 0-2, W Coveney 0-1, K Hogan 0-1. |

| 13 November 1999 Semi-final | Ballincollig | 4-08 - 2-07 | Valley Rovers | Páirc Uí Rinn |
| | A Beale 3-1, P O'Mahony 1-3, T O'Leary 0-2, D Murphy 0-2. | | A Crowley 0-6, A Quirke 1-0, J Hurley 1-0, N McCarthy 0-1. |

=== Final ===
| 21 November 1999 Final | Ballincollig | 1-14 - 2-09 | Blarney | Páirc Uí Chaoimh |
| | P O'Mahony 0-8, G O'Connell 1-1, D Beale 0-2, A Beale 0-1, J O'Dwyer 0-1, E Dineen 0-1. | | A Shanahan 0-5, J Hurley 1-0, T Harrington 1-0, Steven O'Donoghue 0-1, JP Kearney 0-1, J Hughes 0-1, D McSweeney 0-1. |

== Championship statistics ==
=== Top scorers ===
Overall

| Rank | Player | Club | Tally | Total | Matches | Average |
|---|---|---|---|---|---|---|
| 1 | Podsie O'Mahony | Ballincollig | 3-24 | 33 | 4 | 8.25 |
| 2 | Tomás Twomey | Douglas | 2-24 | 30 | 4 | 7.50 |
| 3 | Richie Lewis | Aghada | 2-21 | 27 | 4 | 6.75 |
| 4 | Adrian Shanahan | Blarney | 0-25 | 25 | 6 | 4.16 |
| 5 | Ger Cummins | Ballymartle | 2-17 | 23 | 3 | 7.66 |
| 6 | Alan Beale | Ballincollig | 4-04 | 16 | 4 | 4.00 |
| 6 | Ross McNamara | Blarney | 2-10 | 16 | 6 | 2.66 |
| 6 | Ger Morgan | Cobh | 1-13 | 16 | 3 | 5.33 |
| 9 | Kieran Kingston | Tracton | 4-03 | 15 | 2 | 7.50 |
| 10 | Podsie O'Mahony | Ballincollig | 4-02 | 14 | 4 | 3.50 |
| 10 | Michael Walsh | Argideen Rangers | 1-11 | 14 | 2 | 7.00 |

In a single game

| Rank | Player | Club | Tally | Total | Opposition |
|---|---|---|---|---|---|
| 1 | Tomás Twomey | Douglas | 2-09 | 15 | Ballymartle |
| 2 | Podsie O'Mahony | Ballincollig | 1-10 | 13 | Cobh |
| 3 | Michael Walsh | Argideen Rangers | 1-08 | 11 | Glen Rovers |
| 3 | Ray O'Connell | Mallow | 1-08 | 11 | Ballincollig |
| 5 | Ronan O'Hara | Douglas | 3-01 | 10 | Bride Rovers |
| 5 | Alan Beale | Ballincollig | 3-01 | 10 | Valley Rovers |
| 5 | Joe Deane | Killeagh | 2-04 | 10 | Valley Rovers |
| 8 | Kieran Kingston | Tracton | 2-03 | 9 | Newcestown |
| 8 | Denis O'Leary | Aghabullogue | 1-06 | 9 | Ballymartle |
| 8 | Kevin Murray | CLoughduv | 1-06 | 9 | St. Finbarr's |
| 8 | Tomás Twomey | Douglas | 0-09 | 9 | Éire Óg |
| 8 | Ger Cummins | Ballymartle | 0-09 | 9 | Tracton |
