= 1980–81 Harty Cup =

Hurling tournament

1980–81 Dr Harty Cup
- Dates: 8 October 1980 – 5 April 1981
- Teams: 12
- Champions: North Monastery (16th title); John Drinan (captain)
- Runners-up: Coláiste Chríost Rí

Tournament statistics
- Matches played: 11
- Goals scored: 42 (3.82 per match)
- Points scored: 162 (14.73 per match)
- Top scorer(s): Christy Clancy (4-15)

The 1980–81 Harty Cup was the 61st staging of the Harty Cup since its establishment in hurling by the Munster Council of Gaelic Athletic Association in 1918. The competition contested from 8 October 1980 to 5 April 1981.

North Monastery unsuccessfully defended its title.

North Monastery won the Harty Cup final, 2–06 to 1–07, on 5 April 1981 at Páirc Uí Chaoimh in Cork, against Coláiste Chríost Rí, in what was their first ever meeting in the final, for their 16th successive Harty Cup title overall and a second consecutive title.

St Colman's College's Christy Clancy was the top scorer with 4–15.

== Results ==
=== First round ===
8 October 1980 First round	Coláiste Chríost Rí	4-12 - 0-11	De La Salle College Waterford	Fr Sheehy Park
	K McCarthy 1-4, F Golden 1-1, B Searles 1-0, J Lynch 1-0, M O'Callaghan 0-3, T Leahy 0-3, T Nation 0-1.		S Aherne 0-10, M Sweeney 0-1.

8 October 1980 First round	St Colman's College	2-12 - 2-02	Coláiste Iognáid Rís	Riverstown Sportsfield
	C Clancy 0-9, N O'Brien 1-0, M Gowen 1-0, P Clancy 0-2, N O'Callaghan 0-1.		T Linehan 2-0, E Lyons 0-2.

15 October 1980 First round	St Finbarr's College	1-05 - 4-11	Nenagh CBS	St Ailbe's Park
	B Whelton 1-1, K Kingston 0-2, D Hourigan 0-2, M Lynam 0-1.		J Heffernan 0-7, M McKeogh 1-2, M Morrissey 1-0, L Nolan 1-0, T O'Brien 1-0, D Kennedy 0-1, N Sheehy 0-1.

15 October 1980 First round	Cashel CBS	3-09 - 1-04	Templemore CBS	Semple Stadium
	{ Kenny 0–4, M Clarke 1–0, F Collins 1–0, J McGrath 1–0, J Cormack 0–2, P McCutcheon 0–1, R Stakelum 0–1, G Costelloe 0–1.		J Kennedy 1-1, S Slattery 0–1, D Ryan 0–1, M Keane 0–1.

=== Quarter-finals ===
5 November 1980 Quarter-final	North Monastery	0-11 - 0-07	Thurles CBS	FitzGerald Park
	J Drinan 0-4, J Chisholm 0-3, R Allen 0-1, K Doran 0-1, T O'Mahony 0-1, L Coffey 0-1.		S Dwan 0-3, D Fogarty 0-2, P Ryan 0-1, P Mockler 0-1.

5 November 1980 Quarter-final	Coláiste Chríost Rí	3-06 - 3-05	St Flannan's College	St Ailbe's Park
	B O'Connor 2-0, B Searles 1-1, M O'Callaghan 0-3, F Golden 0-1, K McCarthy 0-1.		G Kierce 1-1, B McNamara 0-4, J Crimmins 1-0, J O'Donovan 1-0.

12 November 1980 Quarter-final	St Colman's College	6-06 - 2-01	Limerick CBS	St Ailbe's Park
	C Clancy 4-3, J Maye 1-1, N O'Callaghan 1-0, K Coakley 0-1, M Gowan 0-1.		J Murphy 2-0, D O'Callaghan 0-1.

12 November 1980 ] Quarter-final	Nenagh CBS	2-10 - 1-10	Templemore CBS	Semple Stadium
	J Heffernan 1-6, L Nolan 1-0, M Morrissey 0-3, T O'Brien 0-1.		P Kenny 0-5, M Clarke 1-0, J Cormack 0-2, A Ryan 0-1, G Costelloe 0-1, F Collin 0-1.

=== Semi-finals ===
15 February 1981 [Semi-final	Coláiste Chríost Rí	1-10 - 1-07	Nenagh CBS	Fr Con Buckley Park
	M O'Callaghan 0-6, T Leahy 1-1, F Golden 0-2, K McCarthy 0-1.		J Heffernan 1-6, J McKeogh 0-1.

1 March 1981 Semi-final	North Monastery	3-07 - 0-03	St Colman's College	Fr Con Buckley Park
	J Drinan 2-1, J Chisholm 1-1, T O'Mahony 0-2, K Doran 0-1, P Murphy 0-1, R Allen 0-1.		C Clancy 0-3.

=== Final ===
5 April 1981 Final	North Monastery	2-06 - 1-07	Coláiste Chríost Rí	Páirc Uí Chaoimh
	J Drinan 1-2, J Chisholm 1-1, K Doran 0-1, R Allen 0-1, T McCarthy 0-1.		F Golden 1-1, M O'Callaghan 0-3, K McCarthy 0-2, B Searles 0-1.	Referee: N Duggan (Limerick)

== Statistics ==
=== Top scorers ===
Rank	Player	County	Tally	Total	Matches	Average
1	Christy Clancy	St Colman's College	4-15	27	3	9.00
2	John Heffernan	Nenagh CBS	2-19	25	3	8.33
3	John Drinan	North Monastery	3-07	16	3	5.33
4	Martin O'Callaghan	Coláiste Chríost Rí	0-15	15	4	3.75
5	John Chisholm	North Monastery	2-05	11	3	3.66
5	Fergus Golden	Coláiste Chríost Rí	2-05	11	4	2.75
5	Kieran McCarthy	Coláiste Chríost Rí	1-08	11	4	2.75
