= Bernie O'Connor =

Irish hurler and manager

Personal information
- Native name: Beircheart Ó Conchubhair (Irish)
- Nickname: Baron
- Born: 1949 (age 76–77) Meelin, County Cork, Ireland

Sport
- Sport: Hurling
- Position: Full-forward
Clubs
- Years: Club
- 1963-1986 1963-1984 1987-1997: Meelin → Duhallow; Newtownshandrum
Club titles
- Cork titles: 0
Inter-county
- Years: County
- 1973-1975 1977: Cork; London
Inter-county titles
- Munster titles: 0
- All-Irelands: 0
- NHL: 0
- All Stars: 0

Benjamin O’Connor (born 1949), known as Bernie O'Connor, is an Irish former hurler and manager. As a player he lined out with Meelin, before later serving as a coach and manager, most notably with Newtownshandrum.

== Playing career ==
O'Connor first played for his club, Meelin, in the Duhallow division in 1962, winning an U14 hurling championship. He followed this U16 and minor hurling medals in 1964 and 1966 respectively. He also played Gaelic football at juvenile level at the time, before later winning league and championship medals in that code with Rockchapel and Knockskevane.

In 1963, O'Connor was drafted onto the Duhallow divisional senior team and made his debut in the Cork SHC as a 14-year-old a year later. After several years of near misses for Meelin, O'Connor won the first of a record-equalling four successive Duhallow JHC titles with his club in 1970.

By this stage, O'Connor had already appeared at inter-county level with Cork. He was the first player from Duhallow to be called up to the minor team and was at full-forward for their defeat of Wexford in the 1967 All-Ireland final. He also lined out with the under-21 team in the opening round of the 1968 Munster U21HC. O'Connor lined out with the senior team during the 1973-73 National League. He later appeared with London in a defeat by Laois in the 1977 All-Ireland SBHC final.

On his return to Ireland, O'Connor won three further successive Duhallow JHC titles in 1980, 1981 and 1982. He completed a divisional double in 1981 by winning a Duhallow JFC medal with Deel Rovers. O'Connor continued to line out with Duhallow until 1984 and won an eighth and final divisional hurling title in 1986.

O'Connor transferred to the Newtownshandrum club in 1986 and extended his playing career for another decade. He won a North Cork JB2HC medal in 1993 and captained the team the following year when the title was retained.

== Coaching career ==
O'Connor's first experience with coaching came with Meelin who, as player-coach, he guided to three successive Duhallow JHC titles from 1980 to 1982. He simultaneously enjoyed success as coach of the Milford team, winning the Cork JHC title in 1981, followed by the Cork IHC title in 1982.

O'Connor had been involved as coach of various teams since transferring to Newtownshandrum as a player. A Cork IHC title in 1996 was followed by three successive Cork U21HC from 1998 to 2000. O'Connor was also manager of the club's senior team that won their first ever Cork SHC title in 2000.

After stepping away from the team the following year, O'Connor was appointed manager of the Kerry senior hurling team in November 2001. He resigned after one season due to a lack of commitment by the players. O'Connor returned to manage the Newtown team to their third Cork SHC title in 2005. A second Munster Club SHC title was later secured before losing to Portumna in the 2006 All-Ireland club final. O'Connor remained involved with the team in various capacities over the following few years before stepping down in 2012.

== Personal life ==
O'Connor's twin sons, Ben and Jerry O'Connor won five All-Ireland SHC medals between them between 1999 and 2005.

== Honours ==
=== Player ===
Meelin

- Duhallow Junior A Hurling Championship: 1970, 1971, 1972, 1973, 1980, 1981, 1982, 1986

Deel Rovers

- North Cork Junior A Football Championship: 1981

Cork

- All-Ireland Minor Hurling Championship: 1967
- Munster Minor Hurling Championship: 1967

=== Management ===
Meelin

- Duhallow Junior A Hurling Championship: 1980, 1981, 1982

Milford

- Cork Intermediate Hurling Championship: 1982
- Cork Junior Hurling Championship: 1981
- North Cork Junior A Hurling Championship: 1981

Newtownshandrum

- Munster Senior Club Hurling Championship: 2005
- Cork Senior Hurling Championship: 2000, 2005
- Cork Intermediate Hurling Championship: 1996
- Cork Under-21 Hurling Championship: 1998, 1999, 2000

Sporting positions
Preceded by Maurice Leahy	Kerry Senior Hurling Manager; 2001-2002	Succeeded by Maurice Leahy
