= Kilbolane Castle =

Castle in County Cork, Ireland

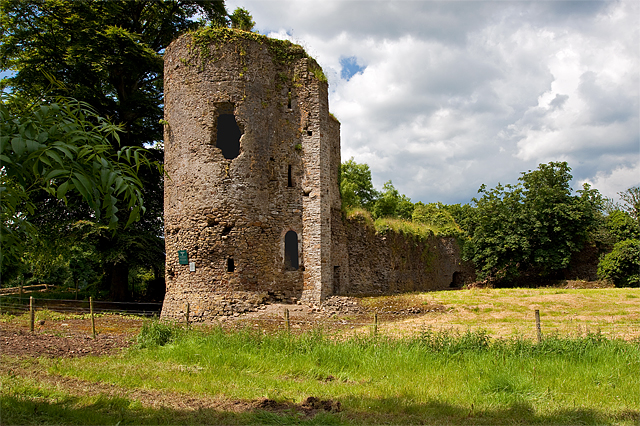
- Kilbolane Castle
- Interactive map of Kilbolane Castle
- Location: County Cork, Ireland
- Coordinates: 52.339°N 8.851°W
- Built: 15th/16th century

National monument of Ireland
- Official name: Kilbolane Castle
- Reference no.: 490

Kilbolane Castle is a historical fortification atop Kilbolane Hill, half a kilometre from the village of Milford, County Cork, Ireland. The castle was built in the 15th or 16th century but employed a 13th-century Norman style with high walls joined by circular guard towers and surrounded by a moat, similar to Liscarroll and Ballincollig.

The castle grounds were church property of the Bishop of Cloyne, from whom it was held, according to the Pipe Roll of Cloyne, in 1291. According to Father Vaughan, the Synans had an interest in the place before moving to the Doneraile area. Kilbolane Castle was built shortly after the arrival of Strongbow and the Anglo-Normans, likely as the stronghold of the De Cogans. It was later acquired by the Earls of Desmond and the Fitzgibbon branch of the Fitzgeralds. In 1587, the castle was granted to Hugo Cuffe who was unable to exert real power in the area and in 1590, it reverted indirectly to the Fitzgibbons when it was granted to Sir William Power, husband of Helena Fitzgibbon.

The castle was destroyed by Cromwell's army in 1642 leaving only two of its towers intact. On removing the remains of the ancient church, the tomb of the Synan family, bearing the date 1446, was transferred to the new edifice.

The east tower was acquired by a captain, John Nicholls, who built a single-storey house against the bawn wall and passed the property on to his eldest grandson, John Bowen. John Bowen began to build Kilbolane House at the end of the castle's garden shortly after 1695. A new church was erected in 1832, chiefly at the expense of the Rev. J. Bruce with support of the Ecclesiastical Commissioners.

In 1897, the ruins of Kilbolane Castle, which had been vacant for some years, were purchased by David O'Leary Hannigan JP (who also purchased Mountshannon House in 1915). The south tower and west wall remain intact, with maintenance provided by the Office of Public Works. The view from the southwest provides a glimpse of the original layout of the castle, with its high walls and tower.
