= 1992 All-Ireland Junior Hurling Championship =

Championship Details
- Dates: 3 May - 30 August 1992
- Teams: 21

All Ireland Champions
- Winners: Wexford (2nd win)
- Captain: Ger Cody

All Ireland Runners-up
- Runners-up: Cork
- Captain: Bill Long

Provincial Champions
- Munster: Cork
- Leinster: Wexford
- Ulster: Down
- Connacht: Not Played

Championship Statistics
- Matches Played: 21
- Total Goals: 49 (2.33 per game)
- Total Points: 455 (21.66 per game)
- Top Scorer: Christy Clancy (0-32)

The 1992 All-Ireland Junior Hurling Championship was the 71st staging of the All-Ireland Junior Championship since its establishment by the Gaelic Athletic Association in 1912. The championship began on 3 May and ended on 30 August 1992.

Tipperary entered the championship as the defending champions, however, they were beaten by Cork in the Munster semi-final.

The All-Ireland final replay was played on 30 August 1992 at Walsh Park in Waterford, between Wexford and Cork, in what was their first ever meeting in a final. Wexford won the match by 0–13 to 1–08 to claim their second championship title overall and a first title since 1985.

Cork's Christy Clancy was the championship's top scorer with 0-32.

== Results ==
=== Leinster Junior Hurling Championship ===
==== Leinster quarter-finals ====
6 May 1992 Quarter-final	Laois	w/o - scr.	Meath	O'Moore Park

6 May 1992 Quarter-final	Longford	0-04 - 6-13	Dublin	Michael Fay Park
	S Stakelum 0-2, J McDermott 0-1, D Sheridan 0-1.		M Byrne 2-2, J Queally 2-2, R McKenna 1-2, J Keegan 1-1, M Riordan 0-3, J Morris 0-1, A Toft 0-1, A McCormack 0-1.

6 May 1992 Quarter-final	Louth	2-10 - 0-13	Carlow	Drogheda Park
	O Kelly 0-5, M Challenor 1-1, P Mulholland 1-0, P Callan 0-2, J Murphy 0-2.		J McDonald 0-9, D Sheehan 0-1, L Ahearne 0-1, E McDonald 0-1, J Walsh 0-1.

6 May 1992 Quarter-final	Wexford	1-15 - 1-15	Kilkenny	Wexford Park
	R Callaghan 0-5, P Byrne 1-1, J Bolger 0-4, R Quigley 0-2, G Coady 0-2, E Cleary 0-1.		R Moran 1-2, C Carter 0-3, P Walsh 0-3, S Ryan 0-3, G Henderson 0-2, M Walsh 0-1, P Treacy 0-1.

15 May 1992 Quarter-final replay	Kilkenny	0-13 - 0-15	Wexford	Nowlan Park
	C Carter 0-6, G Henderson 0-3, P Farrell 0-1, P Walsh 0-1, S Ryan 0-1, M Walsh 0-1.		R Quigley 0-6, G Coady 0-3, E Cleary 0-3, E Scallan 0-2, J Bolger 0-1.

==== Leinster semi-finals ====
27 May 1992 Semi-final	Laois	3-18 - 0-03	Louth	O'Moore Park
	J Daly 1-2, C Dunphy 1-2, E England 1-2, P O'Brien 0-5, G Norton 0-2, M O'Hara 0-2, J O'Sullivan 0-2, F Lalor 0-1.		J Murphy 0-03.

27 May 1992 Semi-final	Wexford	0-19 - 0-14	Dublin	Wexford Park
	R Quigley 0-9, R Callaghan 0-3, PJ Kavanagh 0-2, S Conroy 0-2, J Bolger 0-1, P Owley 0-1, G Coady 0-1.		M O'Riordan 0-7, J Queally 0-2, M Kennedy 0-2, J Morris 0-1, R O'Doherty 0-1, M Byrne 0-1.

==== Leinster final ====
17 June 1992 Final	Wexford	2-11 - 1-12	Laois	Dr. Cullen Park
	S Conroy 1-1, J Bolger 1-0, R Quigley 0-3, E Scallan 0-3, R Callaghan 0-2, G Coady 0-1, P Byrne 0-1.		M O'Hara 0-5, J Daly 1-0, P O'Brien 0-3, W Kirwan 0-1, G Norton 0-1, D Lawlor 0-1, L Bergin 0-1.

=== Munster Junior Hurling Championship ===
==== Munster first round ====
5 May 1992 First round	Cork	0-18 - 0-09	Kerry	Banteer Sportsfield
	B Egan 0-4, C Clancy 0-4, G Manley 0-3, R Sheehan 0-3, B Walsh 0-2, C Coffey 0-1, B Sheehan 0-1.		M Foley 0-7, B Sullivan 0-1, S Sheehan 0-1.

24 May 1992 First round	Clare	0-11 - 0-06	Waterford	Semple Stadium
	P O'Rourke 0-5, B Quinn 0-3, C O'Neill 0-1, T McMahon 0-1, T Kennedy 0-1.		N Dalton 0-2, M O'Mahony 0-2, M Ferncombe 0-1, N Warren 0-1.

==== Munster semi-finals ====
7 June 1992 Semi-final	Cork	2-12 - 0-08	Tipperary	Páirc Uí Chaoimh
	C Clancy 0-8, G Manley 2-0, M Mullins 0-2, B Sheehan 0-1, K Murray 0-1.		S Dwan 0-5, D Fogarty 0-2, P Hallissey 0-1.

14 June 1992 Semi-final	Clare	2-06 - 1-09	Limerick	Semple Stadium
	J McKenna 1-1, K McNamara 1-1, C Clancy 0-1, P Keary 0-1, J O'Connor 0-1, P O'Rourke 0-1.		G Barron 1-1, G Galvin 0-3, G O'Connell 0-2, J Flavin 0-1, P Conlon 0-1, P Potter 0-1.

28 June 1992 Semi-final replay	Clare	2-08 - 1-10	Limerick	Cusack Park
	P McNamara 0-4, P O'Rourke 1-0, K McNamara 1-0, J O'Connor 0-1, B Quinn 0-1, K Kennedy 0-1, J McKenna 0-1.		S Stapleton 0-6, P Conlon 1-0, G O'Connell 0-2, G Galvin 0-1, J Slavin 0-1.

==== Munster final ====
22 July 1992 Final	Cork	1-12 - 1-10	Clare	FitzGerald Park, Kilmallock
	C Clancy 0-7, A O'Driscoll 1-1, D O'Leary 0-2, P Cahill 0-1, K Murray 0-1.		K McNamara 1-0, P McNamara 0-3, J O'Connor 0-2, P Markham 0-2, C Lynch 0-1, C Clancy 0-1, B Quinn 0-1.

=== Ulster Junior Hurling Championship ===
==== Ulster quarter-finals ====
3 May 1992 Quarter-final	Tyrone	w/o - scr.	Cavan	Healy Park

3 May 1992 Quarter-final	Down	4-06 - 2-05	Armagh	Páirc Esler
	J Brown 1-0, T Curran 1-0, D King 1-0, B McAleenan 1-0, S McFall 0-3, J McCrickard 0-2, G Fitzsimons 0-1.		P Lappin 1-0, P Cunningham 1-0, S Hughes 0-2, N Murtagh 0-1, D Shortt 0-1, F Breen 0-1.

==== Ulster semi-finals ====
10 May 1992 Semi-final	Fermanagh	5-16 - 0-05	Tyrone	Brewster Park
	J McGolderick 1-5, S Breslin 1-4, N McDonnell 2-0, R O'Donnell 1-0, P McManus 0-3, S Duffy 0-2, O McShea 0-2.		B McKenny 0-2, S Quinn 0-2, F Daly 0-1.

10 May 1992 Semi-final	Donegal	0-06 - 2-15	Down	MacCumhaill Park
	A Wallace 0-5, B McLaughlin 0-1.		J McCrickard 0-10, D King 1-2, B McAleenan 1-2, D McGee 0-1.

==== Ulster final ====
14 June 1992 Final	Down	1-09 - 0-08	Fermanagh	St. Mary's Park
	JJ McCrickard 1-1, J McCrickard 0-4, P McMahon 0-1, M Sweeney 0-1, D King 0-1, B McAleenan 0-1.		J McGolderick 0-4, K Keogh 0-4.

=== All-Ireland Junior Hurling Championship ===
==== All-Ireland semi-finals ====
19 July 1992 Semi-final	Wexford	5-18 - 0-06	Down	Croke Park
	R Quigley 1-7, J Byrne 2-1, J Bolger 1-2, E Scallan 0-5, S Conroy 1-1, R Callaghan 0-2.		JJ McCrickard 0-4, J McCrickard 0-2.

4 August 1992 Semi-final	Cork	1-12 - 0-14	Galway	Gaelic Grounds
	C Clancy 0-7, A O'Driscoll 1-2, M Sheehan 0-2, B Walsh 0-1.		M Connolly 0-6, J Kelly 0-3, T Kirwan 0-2, M Donnellan 0-2, A Spellman 0-1.	Referee: P Moran (Offaly)

==== All-Ireland finals ====
16 August 1992 Final	Wexford	2-07 - 0-13	Cork	Walsh Park
	S Conroy 2-0, J Byrne 0-5, R Callaghan 0-1, F Cody 0-1.		B Walsh 0-4, C Clancy 0-4, K Murray 0-2, J O'Mahony 0-1, B Harte 0-1, A O'Driscoll 0-1.	Referee: P Delaney (Laois)

30 August 1992 Final replay	Wexford	0-13 - 1-08	Cork	Walsh Park
	G Coady 0-5, J Byrne 0-3, R O'Callaghan 0-2, R Quigley 0-1, J Bolger 0-1, S Conroy 0-1.		B Harte 1-1, C Clancy 0-2, A O'Driscoll 0-1, B Long 0-1, B Walsh 0-1, P Kenneally 0-1, K Murray 0-1.

== Championship statistics ==
=== Top scorers ===
Top scorers overall

Rank	Player	County	Tally	Total	Matches	Average
1	Christy Clancy	Cork	0-32	32	6	5.33
2	Ray Quigley	Wexford	1-28	31	7	4.42
3	Jerome McCrickard	Down	0-18	18	4	4.50
4	Seán Conroy	Wexford	4-05	17	5	3.40
5	John Byrne	Wexford	2-09	15	3	5.00
5	James Bolger	Wexford	2-09	15	7	2.14
5	Robbie O'Callaghan	Wexford	0-15	15	7	2.14
8	Joe McGoldrick	Fermanagh	1-09	12	2	6.00
8	Ger Cody	Wexford	0-12	12	7	1.71
10	Adrian O'Driscoll	Cork	2-05	11	4	2.75

Top scorers in a single game

Rank	Player	Club	Tally	Total	Opposition
1	Ray Quigley	Wexford	1-07	10	Down
1	Jerome McCrickard	Down	0-10	10	Donegal
3	John McDonald	Carlow	0-09	9	Louth
3	Ray Quigley	Wexford	0-09	9	Dublin
5	Mick Byrne	Dublin	2-02	8	Longford
5	Jimmy Queally	Dublin	2-02	8	Longford
5	Joe McGoldrick	Fermanagh	1-05	8	Tyrone
5	Christy Clancy	Cork	0-08	8	Tipperary
9	John Byrne	Wexford	2-01	7	Down
9	Séamus Breslin	Fermanagh	1-04	7	Tyrone
9	Michael O'Riordan	Dublin	0-07	7	Wexford
9	Mick Foley	Kerry	0-07	7	Cork
9	Christy Clancy	Cork	0-07	7	Clare
9	Christy Clancy	Cork	0-07	7	Galway
