= Kilbarry, Cork City =

Townland in the city of Cork, Ireland

Coordinates: 51.925°N 8.476°W

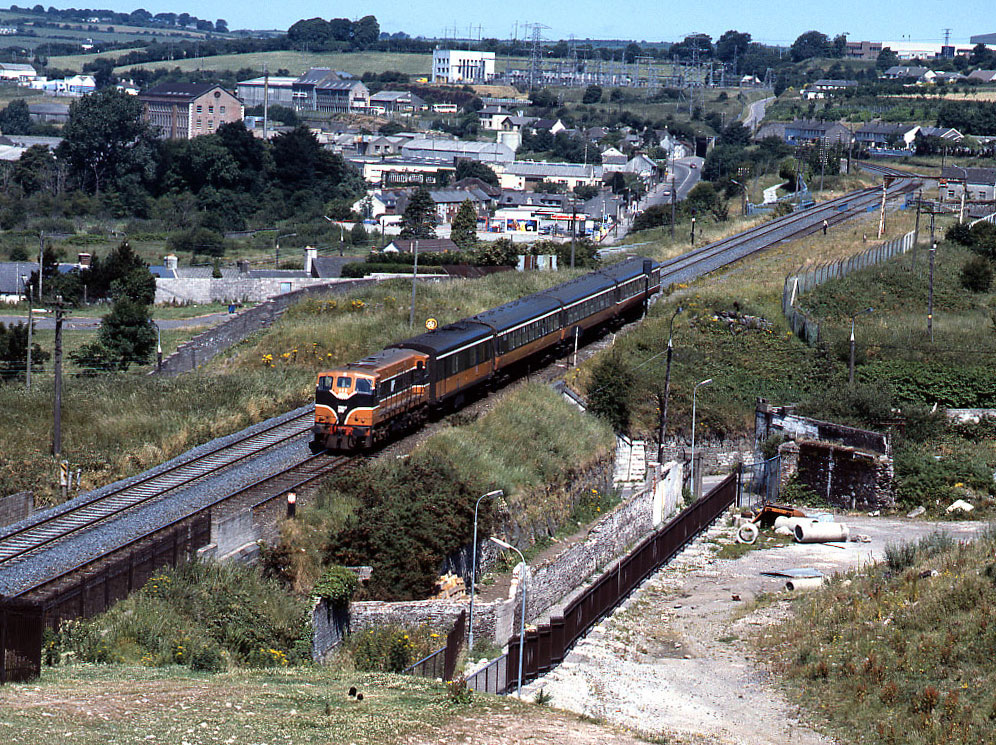
A train passing through Kilbarry in 1989

Kilbarry (Irish: Cill Bharra) is a townland in the civil parish of Saint Anne's on the northside of Cork City in Ireland. Located close to the suburb of Blackpool, Kilbarry itself had just 56 residents in 2011. It is primarily zoned for commercial use, and an IDA Ireland business park occupies 190 of the townland's 300 acres. Delaney Rovers GAA also have a pitch at Kilbarry.

== Railway halt ==
Formerly the site of a small rail yard and siding on the Dublin–Cork railway line, Irish Rail applied for planning permission to construct a station at Kilbarry in 2008. As of 2013, funding and planning for a number of proposed stations (including Kilbarry) had been scrapped, and by 2017 it was confirmed that the station's construction had been "permanently" "shelved". The Cork Metropolitan Area Draft Transport Strategy 2040, a public consultation document published by the National Transport Authority in May 2019, included "Blackpool/Kilbarry" as one of several possible train station locations in the area.
