= Meelin =

Village in County Cork, Ireland

Meelin An Mhaoilinn
- Village
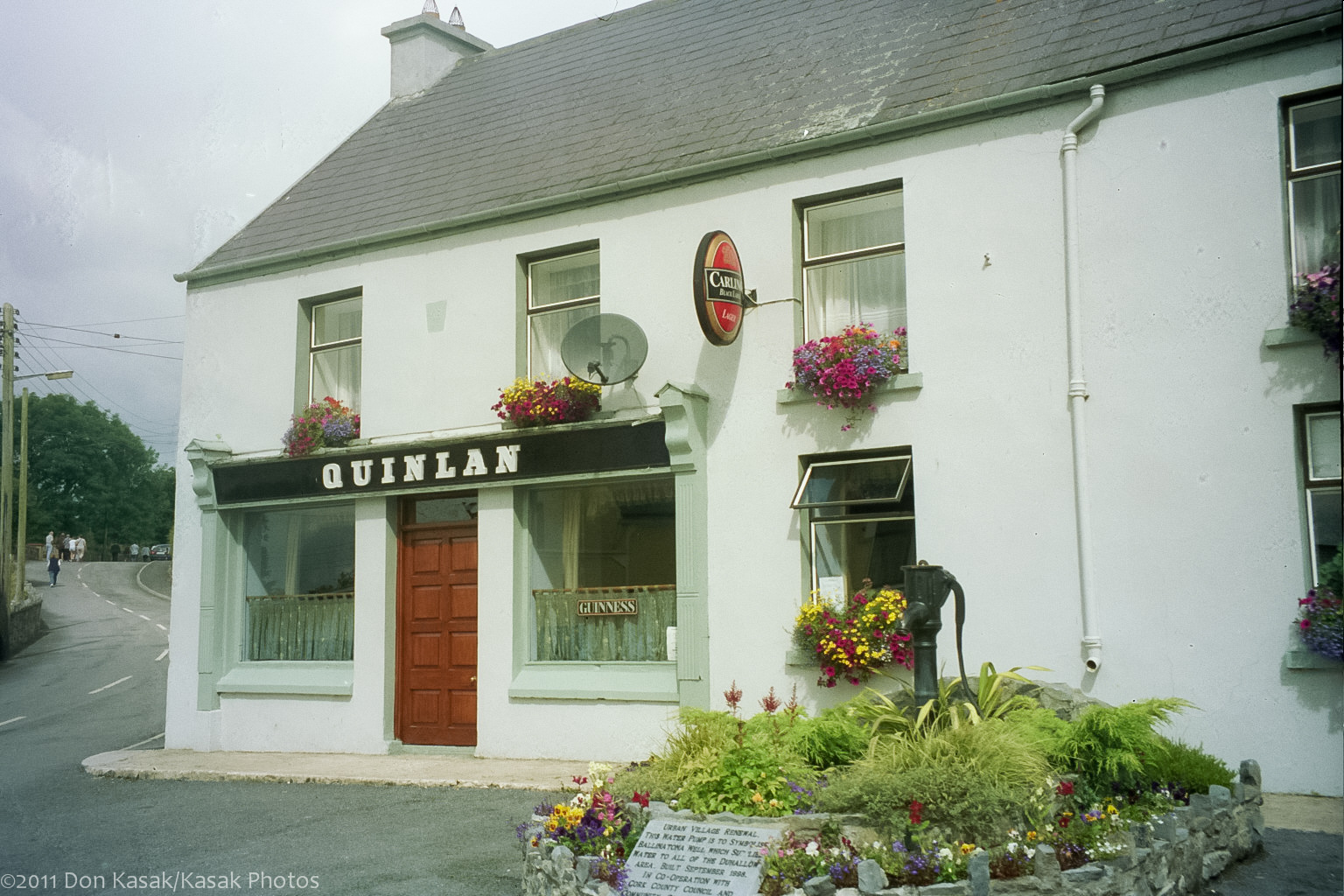
- Pub and floral display in Meelin

- Location in Ireland
- Coordinates: 52°15′54″N 9°01′55″W
- Country: Ireland
- Province: Munster
- County: County Cork
- Elevation: 253.5 m (832 ft)
- Irish Grid Reference: R295131

Meelin (Irish: An Mhaoilinn, meaning 'bare, flat-topped hillock') is a village in northern County Cork, barony of Duhallow, Ireland. The village is near the border with County Limerick and County Kerry. Meelin is within the Cork North-West electoral constituency.

At 251 metres (823 ft) above sea level, Meelin is one of the highest villages in Ireland.

== History ==
Fulacht fiadhs are found in Meelin and around the Duhallow area. There is also a 4,000-year-old burial mound in the village.

In the early 20th century quarries were set up in the village and employed over 100 people. But in the 1920s quarrying started to slow down and by 1964 it had stopped altogether. In 1963, English geologist William Morton carried out a survey of the limestone area around the village and assumed there might be oil deep in the rocks. After three oil companies drilled over 5,000 feet into the rocks, no oil or gas was found.

== Churches ==
The church of Saint Joseph was built in 1837, Meelin is part of the Clonfert parish. In 1871 a Bell for the church was brought to the village by John Murphy. It was built over the gallery in a bell tower and remained there until 1970 when repairs were carried out on the church.

== Sport ==
The village is home to Meelin GAA which was founded in 1928. Hurling is the predominant sport in Meelin. The Meelin hurling team won the Cork Junior A County Championship in 2010. Football is also played at Junior B Level. Meelin won the Junior Hurling Championship final against John Lockes in February 2011.

== Education ==
Meelin National School had an extension built on in 2011. The original school was opened on 1 July 1856, and built of cut stone from the local limestone quarries. At that time there were two schools, a boys' school and a girls' school. The first teacher in the boys' school was John Browne, and his wife Mary Bridget (née Kenneally) was in the girls' school. On 1 April 1951 the boys' and girls' schools amalgamated. Teachers and pupils transferred to the new school across the road after the summer holidays in September 1951. The school is still open today.

== People ==
- Bernie O'Connor, hurler and hurling manager, is from Meelin
