= 1982 Cork Intermediate Hurling Championship =

Irish hurling competition

- Dates: 9 May – 17 October 1982
- Teams: 19
- Champions: Milford (1st title); Mossie Fitzgibbon (captain); Bernie O'Connor (manager)
- Runners-up: Erin's Own

Tournament statistics
- Matches played: 18
- Goals scored: 74 (4.11 per match)
- Points scored: 337 (18.72 per match)
- Top scorer(s): Don O'Leary (4-14)

The 1982 Cork Intermediate Hurling Championship was the 73rd staging of the Cork Intermediate Hurling Championship since its establishment by the Cork County Board in 1909.

On 17 October 1982, Milford won the championship following a 4-07 to 1-05 defeat of Erin's Own in the final at Páirc Mac Gearailt. It remains their only championship title.

Cloughduv's Don O'Leary was the championship's top scorer with 4-14.

== Results ==
=== First round ===
22 May 1982 First round	Carrigtwohill	3-10 - 2-07	St. Vincent's	Erin's Own Grounds
	S Cashman 2-0, B Landers 0-5, MJ Roche 1-0, F Rohan 0-3, P O'Connor 0-1, B Dineen 0-1.		A Russell 1-1, F Crowley 1-0, M Higgins 0-3, L Harte 0-1, L McKenzie 0-1, D Cahalane 0-1.

24 May 1982 First round	Glen Rovers	2-09 - 2-04	Mayfield	Church Road
	T O'Neill 1-1, R Hegarty 1-1, D Sexton 0-3, K O'Keeffe 0-3, P Deasy 0-1.		S Lucey 2-1, M Hallon 0-1, T Coughlan 0-1, J Rall 0-1.

30 May 1982 First round	Erin's Own	1-11 - 0-07	Blackrock	Páirc Uí Chaoimh
	M Bowen 0-4, B Hayes 1-0, G Bowen 0-3, J Bowen 0-2, R O'Connor 0-1, B Murphy 0-1.		F Delaney 0-6, D Cronin 0-1.

=== Second round ===
9 May 1982 Second round	Mallow	2-09 - 1-08	Ballinhassig	Blarney
	P Buckley 0-8, Jody Hayes 1-0, Jerry Hayes 1-0, P Lawton 0-1.		C Cottrell 1-0, J Reynolds 0-3, D McCarthy 0-1, F O'Leary 0-1, N Cullinane 0-1, B Coleman 0-1, D Brosnan 0-1.

16 May 1982 Second round	Bishopstown	1-05 - 1-13	St. Finbarr's	Mayfield
	D O'Donovan 1-0, E Murphy 0-2, G McCarthy 0-1, C Coffey 0-1, M Lyons 0-1.		G O'Shea 1-3, G Murphy 0-6, S Murphy 0-1, J Kelly 0-1, M Kennedy 0-1, F Ramsey 0-1.

22 May 1982 Second round	Milford	3-09 - 2-03	Passage	Castletownroche
	J O'Gorman 1-2, M Fitzgibbon 1-1, T Sheehan 1-0, N Fitzgibbon 0-3, J Dillon 0-2, P Madigan 0-1.		J Harding 1-1, D Keane 1-1, B Meade 0-1.

22 May 1982 Second round	Tracton	1-13 - 5-04	Inniscarra	Ballinhassig
	F Canty 1-5, M Quinn 0-3, V Dempsey 0-3, P Harrington 0-2.		M McDonnell 2-0, P McDonnell 2-0, T Buckley 1-1, M O'Donoghue 0-2, P O'Connell 0-1.

6 June 1982 Second round	Carrigtwohill	1-12 - 3-15	Rathluirc	Fitzgerald Park
	B Landers 0-7, D Keane 1-0, P Keane 0-2, MJ Roche 0-1, S Cashman 0-1, M Donan 0-1.		J Dennehy 1-5, E Kenneally 2-1, K O'Shea 0-4, J Fitzgerald 0-2, D O'Sullivan 0-2, E O'Shea 0-1.

12 June 1982 Second round	Glen Rovers	3-06 - 1-17	Erin's Own	Riverstown Sportsfield
	K O'Keeffe 2-1, T O'Brien 1-0, T O'Neill 0-2, K McCann 0-1, D Coughlan 0-1, D Sexton 0-1.		M Bowen 0-5, R O'Connor 0-4, G Bowen 0-4, B Murphy 1-0, B Hayes 0-2, PJ Murphy 0-1, J Bowen 0-1.

12 June 1982 Second round	Cloughduv	1-07 - 1-07	Newcestown	Charlie Hurley Park
	D O'Leary 1-1, D Walsh 0-3, C Kelly 0-3.		T Crowley 0-6, John Collins 1-0, D O'Leary 0-1.

7 August 1982 Second round replay	Cloughduv	6-11 - 1-12	Newcestown	Charlie Hurley Park
	D O'Leary 1-7, C Kelly 3-0, P McDonnell 1-0, R Lynch 1-0, D Walsh 0-2, J Grainger 0-1, C Barry-Murphy 0-1.		T Crowley 1-7, G Long 0-2, N Collins 0-2, D O'Leary 0-1.

Second round	Bandon	w/o - scr.	Na Piarsaigh

=== Quarter-finals ===
4 July 1982 Quarter-final	Inniscarra	7-07 - 3-12	Mallow	Church Road
	T Buckley 3-0, P McDonnell 2-2, M McDonnell 1-0, H O'Sullivan 1-0, M Manley 0-2, M O'Donovan 0-1, G O'Mahony 0-1, C Ryan 0-1.		P Buckley 0-5, P Redmond 1-1, T Coakley 1-0, G Hayes 1-0, D Murphy 0-3, J Hayes 0-2, P Shine 0-1.

9 July 1982 Quarter-final	Milford	1-13 - 0-11	St. Finbarr's	Castletownroche
	J O'Gorman 1-1, M Fitzgibbon 0-4, J Dillon 0-3, T Sheehan 0-2, N Fitzgibbon 0-1, V Sheehan 0-1, D Roche 0-1.		G O'Shea 0-3, G Murphy 0-3, T Leahy 0-2, N Goulding 0-1, M Kennedy 0-1, F Ramsey 0-1.

11 July 1982 Quarter-final	Erin's Own	2-16 - 0-02	Rathluirc	Mallow
	PJ Murphy 1-2, G Bowen 0-4, M Bowen 0-4, J Bowen 0-4, D Ahern 1-0, R O'Connor 0-2.		J Dennehy 0-1, P O'Sullivan 0-1.

23 August 1982 Quarter-final	Bandon	1-17 - 3-10	Cloughduv	Páirc Naomh Eoin
	P Crowley 1-11, R Wilmot 0-2, A Desmond 0-1, G O'Mahony 0-1, D Duggan 0-1, D Desmond 0-1.		D O'Leary 2-6, D Walsh 1-0, C Barry-Murphy 0-1, B McSweeney 0-1, C Kelly 0-1, T Barry-Murphy 0-1.

=== Semi-finals ===
22 August 1982 Semi-final	Erin's Own	4-16 - 1-04	Inniscarra	Páirc Uí Chaoimh
	G Bowen 2-6, B Hayes 1-0, B Murphy 1-0, M Bowen 0-3, PJ Murphy 0-3, R O'Connor 0-3, K Murphy 0-1.		L Barry 1-0, D Hanlon 0-2, P O'Connell 0-1, H O'Sullivan 0-1.

19 September 1982 Semi-final	Milford	3-09 - 1-09	Bandon	Coachford Sportsfield
	V Sheehan 1-4, T Sheehan 2-0, S O'Gorman 0-2, S Sheehan 0-1, N Fitzgibbon 0-1, J O'Gorman 0-1.		P Crowley 0-4, N Crowley 0-4, R Wilmot 1-0, J Gabriel 0-1.

=== Final ===
17 October 1982 Final	Milford	4-07 - 1-05	Erin's Own	Fitzgerald Park
	P Buckley 2-1, V Sheehan 0-4, N Fitzgibbon 1-0, J O'Gorman 1-0, S Sheehan 0-1, P Magidgan 0-1.		R O'Connor 1-1, J Bowen 0-2, G Bowen 0-2.	Referee: F Murphy (Blackrock)

== Championship statistics ==
=== Top scorers ===
Overall

Rank	Player	Club	Tally	Total	Matches	Average
1	Don O'Leary	Cloughduv	4-14	26	3	8.66
2	Ger Bowen	Erin's Own	2-19	25	5	5.00
3	Pádraig Crowley	Bandon	1-15	18	2	9.00
4	Pat McDonnell	Inniscarra	5-02	17	4	4.25
5	Tim Crowley	Newcestown	1-13	16	2	8.00
5	Martin Bowen	Erin's Own	0-16	16	5	3.20
7	Raymond O'Connor	Erin's Own	1-11	14	5	2.80
8	Timmy Buckley	Inniscarra	4-01	13	2	6.50
8	Connie Kelly	Cloughduv	3-04	13	3	4.33
8	Paddy Buckley	Mallow	0-13	13	2	6.50
8	Johnny O'Gorman	Milford	3-04	13	4	3.23

In a single game

Rank	Player	Club	Tally	Total	Opposition
1	Pádraig Crowley	Bandon	1-11	14	Cloughduv
2	Don O'Leary	Cloughduv	2-06	12	Bandon
2	Ger Bowen	Erin's Own	2-06	12	Inniscarra
4	Tim Crowley	Newcestown	1-07	10	Cloughduv
5	Connie Kelly	Cloughduv	3-00	9	Newcestown
5	Timmy Buckley	Inniscarra	3-00	9	Mallow
7	Pat McDonnell	Inniscarra	2-02	8	Mallow
7	Finbarr Canty	Tracton	1-05	8	Inniscarra
7	John Dennehy	Rathluirc	1-05	8	Carrigtwohill
7	Paddy Buckley	Mallow	0-08	8	Ballinhassig
