= Duhallow Junior A Hurling Championship =

Annual hurling competition

- Code: Hurling
- Founded: 1933; 93 years ago
- Region: Duhallow (GAA)
- Trophy: John Joe Brosnan Memorial Cup
- No. of teams: 7
- Title holders: Newmarket (18th title)
- Most titles: Meelin (20 titles)
- Sponsors: Kanturk Co-Op Mart
- Official website: Duhallow GAA

The Duhallow Junior A Hurling Championship (known for sponsorship reasons as the Kanturk Co-Op Mart Junior A Hurling Championship) is an annual hurling competition organised by the Duhallow Board of the Gaelic Athletic Association since 1933 for junior hurling teams in the Barony of Duhallow in County Cork, Ireland.

The series of games are played during the summer and autumn months. The championship starts with 2 groups and the group winners and runners-up advance to the knockout stage. This gives each team at least 3 matches.

The Duhallow Junior A Hurling Championship is an integral part of the wider Cork Junior A Hurling Championship. The winners of the Duhallow championship join their counterparts from the other six divisions to contest the county championship.

Newmarket are the 2026 title-holders, having defeated Dromtarriffe by 1–23 to 2–16 in the 2026 final.

== Format ==
=== Group stage ===
The 8 teams are divided into two groups of four. Over the course of the group stage, each team plays once against the others in the group, resulting in each team being guaranteed at least three games. Two points are awarded for a win, one for a draw and zero for a loss. The teams are ranked in the group stage table by points gained, then scoring difference and then their head-to-head record. The top two teams in each group qualify for the knockout stage.

=== Knockout stage ===
Semi-finals: The two group winners and the two runners-up from the group stage contest this round. The two winners from these games advance to the final.

Final: The two semi-final winners contest the final. The winning team are declared champions.

=== Promotion and relegation ===
At the end of the championship, the winning team enters the Cork Junior A Hurling Championship and by winning this, they will be promoted to the Cork Premier Junior Hurling Championship for the following season. There is no relegation to the Duhallow Junior B Hurling Championship.

== Teams ==
=== 2026 teams ===
The 7 teams competing in the 2026 Duhallow Junior A Hurling Championship are:

Club	Location	Colours	Position in 2026	In Championship since	Championship Titles	Last Championship Title
Banteer	Banteer	Red and white	Group stage	—	8	2017
Dromtarriffe	Rathcoole	Red and white	Runners-up	2017	5	2024
Freemount	Freemount	Maroon and white	Semi-finals	2023	6	2005
Kilbrin	Kilbrin	Blue and white	Group stage	—	11	2016
Meelin	Meelin	Green and gold	Semi-finals	2026	20	2010
Millstreet	Millstreet	Green and yellow	Group stage	—	3	1963
Newmarket	Newmarket	Black and red	Champions	—	18	2026

== Roll of honour ==
=== By club ===
#	Club	Titles	Runners-Up	Championships won	Championships runner-up
1	Meelin	20	10	1939, 1940, 1941, 1943, 1970, 1971, 1972, 1973, 1977, 1980, 1981, 1982, 1986, 1990, 1991, 1993, 1994, 1996, 2009, 2010	1946, 1947, 1948, 1966, 1968, 1969, 1974, 1984, 1995, 2002
2	Newmarket	18	11	1934, 1935, 1936, 1937, 1942, 1946, 1947, 1948, 1950, 1964, 1974, 1975, 1976, 1979, 2019, 2023, 2025, 2026	1943, 1945, 1951, 1952, 1956, 1972, 1973, 1980, 1985, 2018, 2024
3	Kilbrin	11	12	1978, 1989, 1992, 1999, 2004, 2007, 2011, 2012, 2013, 2014, 2016	1982, 1983, 1986, 1988, 1994, 1997, 2000, 2001, 2010, 2017, 2019, 2020
4	Kanturk	9	7	1944, 1949, 1965, 1966, 1967, 1968, 1969, 2002, 2003	1950, 1954, 1958, 1959, 1961, 1977, 1987
5	Banteer	8	14	1938, 1952, 1955, 1956, 1957, 1995, 2006, 2017	1937, 1953, 1962, 1989, 1991, 1992, 1998, 1999, 2008, 2009, 2012, 2014, 2016, 2022
6	Freemount	6	8	1988, 1997, 1998, 2000, 2001, 2005	1939, 1940, 1942, 1993, 2003, 2006, 2011, 2015
7	Tullylease	5	12	1945, 1958, 1959, 1961, 2008	1957, 1965, 1967, 1970, 1971, 1975, 1976, 1978, 1979, 1981, 2007, 2013
7	Castlemagner	5	4	1951, 1953, 1954, 1960, 2015	1941, 1949, 1963, 1964
7	Dromtarriffe	5	3	2018, 2020, 2021, 2022, 2024	2023, 2025, 2026
10	Lismire	4	1	1983, 1984, 1985, 1987	1990
11	Millstreet	3	9	1933, 1962, 1963	1934, 1935, 1944, 1955, 1960, 1996, 2004, 2005, 2021
12	Dromahane	0	2	—	1933, 1938
12	Capp Rovers	0	1	—	1936

== List of finals ==
Year	Winners		Runners-up		Source
Year	Club	Score	Club	Score	Source
2026	Newmarket	1–23	Dromtarriffe	2–16	
2025	Newmarket	3–28	Dromtarriffe	1–23	
2024	Dromtarriffe	3–18	Newmarket	3–14	
2023	Newmarket	4–14	Dromtarriffe	2–13	
2022	Dromtarriffe	1–26	Banteer	1–13	
2021	Dromtarriffe	2–18	Millstreet	1–14	
2020	Dromtarriffe	0–30	Kilbrin	2–13	
2019	Newmarket	1-22	Kilbrin	2-11	
2018	Dromtarriffe	2-17	Newmarket	0-16	
2017	Banteer	1-17	Kilbrin	0-14	
2016	Kilbrin	3-14	Banteer	0-15	
2015	Castlemagner	1-13	Freemount	1-11	
2014	Kilbrin	1-17	Banteer	0-11	
2013	Kilbrin	0-21	Tullylease	1-14	
2012	Kilbrin	2-17	Banteer	3-12	
2011	Kilbrin	2-16	Freemount	0-18	
2010	Meelin	2-12	Kilbrin	1-14	
2009	Meelin	1-15	Banteer	2-09	
2008	Tullylease	2-22	Banteer	3-10	
2007	Kilbrin	1-17	Tullylease	1-10	
2006	Banteer	4-07	Freemount	1-14	
2005	Freemount	1-09	Millstreet	0-09	
2004	Kilbrin	3-14	Millstreet	1-15	
2003	Kanturk	1-07, 3-08	Freemount	1-07, 0-07	
2002	Kanturk	2-14	Meelin	1-12	
2001	Freemount	4-05	Kilbrin	0-08	
2000	Freemount	1-07	Kilbrin	0-06	
1999	Kilbrin	1-13	Banteer	3-03	
1998	Freemount	0-11	Banteer	0-02	
1997	Freemount	2-08	Kilbrin	1-09	
1996	Meelin	2-12	Millstreet	2-07	
1995	Banteer	1-12	Meelin	0-13	
1994	Meelin	0-13	Kilbrin	0-10	
1993	Meelin	1-16	Freemount	2-02	
1992	Kilbrin	2-14	Banteer	2-11	
1991	Meelin	0-17	Banteer	3-05	
1990	Meelin	4-08	Lismire	1-10	
1989	Kilbrin	1-13	Banteer	1-06	
1988	Freemount	1-11, 1–11	Kilbrin	1-11, 1-07	
1987	Lismire	5-12	Kanturk	4-11	
1986	Meelin	3-21	Kilbrin	2-11	
1985	Lismire	2-12	Newmarket	3-08	
1984	Lismire	1-12	Meelin	1-10	
1983	Lismire	2-11	Kilbrin	1-11	
1982	Meelin	1-13	Kilbrin	1-06	
1981	Meelin	1-14	Tullylease	1-13	
1980	Meelin	4-12	Newmarket	2-10	
1979	Newmarket	3-15	Tullylease	2-09	
1978	Kilbrin	4-14	Tullylease	1-08	
1977	Meelin	5-09	Kanturk	2-07	
1976	Newmarket	1-08	Tullylease	0-07	
1975	Newmarket	0-14	Tullylease	1-08	
1974	Newmarket	2-06	Meelin	2-04	
1973	Meelin	5-07	Newmarket	1-05	
1972	Meelin	6-07	Newmarket	2-11	
1971	Meelin	5-08	Tullylease	3-10	
1970	Meelin	3-09	Tullylease	1-07	
1969	Kanturk	4-02	Meelin	1-10	
1968	Kanturk	3-18	Meelin	1-06	
1967	Kanturk	3-11	Tullylease	3-08	
1966	Kanturk	6-07	Meelin	4-09	
1965	Kanturk	4-08	Tullylease	3-07	
1964	Newmarket	2-07	Castlemagner	1-04	
1963	Millstreet	W/o	Castlemagner	Scr.	
1962	Millstreet	3-12	Banteer	1-06	
1961	Tullylease	4-06	Kanturk	4-05	
1960	Castlemagner	3-06	Millstreet	1-03	
1959	Tullylease	2-05	Kanturk	2-03	
1958	Tullylease	4-04	Kanturk	0-03	
1957	Banteer	3-02, 9-07	Tullylease	3-02, 2-02	
1956	Banteer	5-03	Newmarket	1-07	
1955	Banteer	3-03, 5-03	Millstreet	1-09, 7–12	*
1954	Castlemagner	3-06	Kanturk	0-00	
1953	Castlemagner	2-04	Banteer	2-00	
1952	Banteer	3-03	Newmarket	2-05	
1951	Castlemagner	2-05, 3-02	Newmarket	3-02, 1-00	
1950	Newmarket	3-05	Kanturk	1-03	
1949	Kanturk	2-06	Castlemagner	2-02	
1948	Newmarket		Meelin		
1947	Newmarket	5-06	Meelin	0-00	
1946	Newmarket	6-05	Meelin	3-01	
1945	Tullylease	W/o	Newmarket	Scr.	
1944	Kanturk	3-06	Millstreet	2-04	
1943	Meelin		Newmarket		
1942	Newmarket	5-07	Freemount	5-06	
1941	Meelin	2-05	Castlemagner	0-00	
1940	Meelin	7-04	Freemount	5-01	
1939	Meelin	W/o	Freemount	Scr.	
1938	Banteer	4-01	Dromahane	2-01	
1937	Banteer	1-00, 2-01, 4-00	Newmarket	0-00, 1-04, 2-00	*
1936	Newmarket	5-06	Capp Rovers	4-02	
1935	Newmarket	6-02	Millstreet	4-02	
1934	Newmarket	6-02	Millstreet	1-02	
1933	Millstreet	3-02	Dromahane	1-01	
=== Notes === : 1937 - First game abandoned due to fighting. Second replay had more fighting. Championship declared null and void.; 1955 - Kanturk win on objection

== Records and statistics ==
=== Team results by championship ===
Legend

- 1st – Champions
- 2nd – Runners-up
- SF/GS – Semi-finals/Group Stage

For each year, the number of teams in the championship (in brackets) are shown.

Team	2020 (7)	2021 (7)	2022 (7)	2023 (8)	2024 (7)	Years
Banteer	GS	GS	2nd	GS		5
Castlemagner	GS	GS	GS	GS	GS	5
Dromtarriffe	1st	1st	1st	2nd		5
Freemount	—	—	—	GS	GS	2
Kanturk	GS	GS	GS	GS	—	4
Kilbrin	2nd	SF	SF	SF		5
Millstreet	GS	2nd	GS	SF	GS	5
Newmarket	GS	SF	SF	1st		5

== See also ==
- Duhallow Junior A Football Championship
