= Milford, County Cork =

Village in County Cork, Ireland

Milford Áth an Mhuilinn (Irish)
- Village
- Location in Ireland
- Coordinates: 52°20′27″N 08°51′20″W
- Country: Ireland
- Province: Munster
- County: County Cork

Population (2022)
  - Total: 264
- Time zone: UTC+0 (WET)
  - Summer (DST): UTC-1 (IST (WEST))

Milford (Irish: Áth an Mhuilinn) is a small village in County Cork, Ireland. It is in the townland of Kilbolane on the R515 road, close to the border with County Limerick. Milford is in the Dáil constituency of Cork North-West.

Milford has two pubs, a local church, an ancient castle, a primary school, a creamery, a Garda station, and a tennis court. It has scored very highly in the National Tidy Towns competition in recent years. It is located half a kilometre from Kilbolane Castle, historically the local seat of power. The local church is the Church of the Assumption of the Blessed Virgin Mary.

== See also ==
- List of towns and villages in Ireland
