= Christy Clancy =

Irish hurler

Personal information
- Native name: Criostóir Mac Lannchaidh (Irish)
- Born: 1964 (age 61–62) Ballynoe, County Cork, Ireland
- Occupation: Retired primary school principal

Sport
- Sport: Hurling
- Position: Right corner-forward
Clubs
- Years: Club
- 1981-2001 1984-1993: St. Catherine's → Imokilly
Club titles
- Cork titles: 0
College
- Years: College
- Mary Immaculate College
College titles
- Fitzgibbon titles: 0
Inter-county*
Years	County	Apps (scores)
1986-1987	Cork	0 (0-00)
Inter-county titles
- Munster titles: 0
- All-Irelands: 0
- NHL: 0
- All Stars: 0
- *Inter County team apps and scores correct as of 10:45, 4 April 2023.

Christopher Clancy (born 1964) is an Irish retired hurler. He lined out with club side St. Catherine's, divisional team Imokilly, and at the inter-county level with Cork.

== Career ==
Clancy first played hurling as a schoolboy at St. Colman's College in Fermoy, lining out in various competitions including the Harty Cup. He later lined out with Mary Immaculate College in Limerick, while simultaneously beginning adult club hurling with St. Catherine's. After winning two East Cork JAHC titles, Clancy was the top scorer when the club won the Cork JHC title in 1983. He also earned selection to the Imokilly divisional team around this time. Clancy won a Cork IHC medal in 1994 before ending his 20-year club career in 2001.

Clancy first played for Cork as a member of the minor team in 1982. He was overlooked for the under-21 team but made a number of appearances for the senior team in various tournaments and trial games in 1986 and 1987. Clancy later joined the junior team and won a Munster JHC medal in 1992 before lining out in the subsequent All-Ireland final defeat by Wexford.

== Personal life ==
Clancy qualified as a primary school teacher and worked in various schools in Cork. He joined the staff of St Kevin's National School in Littleton, County Tipperary in 1990, eventually becoming principal before his retirement in 2020.

== Honours ==
St. Catherine's

- Cork Intermediate Hurling Championship: 1994
- Cork Junior Hurling Championship: 1983
- East Cork Junior A Hurling Championship: 1981, 1983

Cork

- Munster Junior Hurling Championship: 1992
