= Kevin Murray (hurler) =

Irish hurler

Personal information
- Native name: Caoimhín Ó Muirí (Irish)
- Born: Kilmichael, County Cork, Ireland
- Occupation: Financial adviser
- Height: 5 ft 11 in (180 cm)

Sport
- Sport: Hurling
- Position: Forward
Clubs
Years	Club	Apps (scores)
198?-199? 1989-2001 1990-2001 2002-2010	Kilmichael Cloughduv → Muskerry; St Finbarr's	21 (12–66); 27 (12–95)
Club titles
- Cork titles: 0
Inter-county*
Years	County	Apps (scores)
1994–2002	Cork	17 (3–13)
Inter-county titles
- Munster titles: 2
- All-Irelands: 1
- NHL: 0
- All Stars: 0
- *Inter County team apps and scores correct as of 20:04, 4 August 2014.

Kevin Murray (born 1972) is an Irish former hurler and who played as a left wing-forward at senior level for the Cork county team.

Born in Kilmichael, and educated at St Finbarr's College, Farranferris in Cork City, Murray first arrived on the inter-county scene at the age of seventeen when he linked up with the Cork minor team, before later joining the under-21 and junior sides. He made his senior debut during the 1994 championship. Murray went on to play a key part for Cork for almost a decade, and won one All-Ireland medals and two Munster medals.

As a member of the Munster inter-provincial team, Murray won one Railway Cup medal. At club level he played with Cloughduv and St. Finbarr's.

His sister, Aoife, is an All-Ireland medallist with Cork in camogie. His other sisters, Claire and Emer, have played underage Gaelic football for Cork. His brother, Paudie, has won junior and intermediate football All-Ireland medals with Cork.

Throughout his career Murray made 17 championship appearances for Cork. He retired from inter-county hurling following the conclusion of the 2002 championship.

== Playing career ==
=== Club ===
Murray began his club hurling career with Cloughduv before later transferring to southside city club St Finbarr's.

=== Inter-county ===
Murray joined the Cork minor team in 1990. He won a Munster medal that year following a 1–9 to 0–9 defeat of Clare. Cork later faced Kilkenny in the All-Ireland decider, however, both sides finished level at 3–14 apiece. In the replay Kilkenny proved too strong as Cork faced a heavy 3–16 to 0–11 defeat.

The following year Murray was called up to the Cork under-21 hurling team. He won a Munster medal that year as Cork defeated Limerick by 0–17 to 1–7. Murray added a second Munster under-21 medal to his collection in 1993 following another 1–18 to 3–9 defeat of Limerick. Once again All-Ireland success eluded the team.

In 1992 Murray was a key member of the Cork junior team. He collected a Munster medal that year following a hard-fought 1–12 to 1–10 defeat of Clare. The All-Ireland final pitted Cork against Wexford, however, the sides finished level. The replay saw Cork start well, however, Wexford built up a six-point lead. Even when playing with the wind in the second half Cork failed to turn the tide and were defeated by 0–13 to 1–8.

On 5 June 1994 Murray made his senior championship debut when introduced as a substitute in a 4–14 to 4–11 Munster quarter-final defeat by Limerick.

After a seven-year hiatus Cork's hurlers claimed the provincial title in 1999. A 1–15 to 0–14 defeat of three-in-a-row hopefuls Clare gave Murray his first Munster medal. Cork later faced Kilkenny in the All-Ireland decider on 12 September 1999. In a dour contest played on a wet day, Cork trailed by 0–5 to 0–4 after a low-scoring first half. Kilkenny increased the pace after the interval, pulling into a four-point lead. Cork moved up a gear and through Joe Deane, Ben O'Connor and Seánie McGrath Cork scored five unanswered points. Kilkenny could only manage one more score – a point from a Henry Shefflin free – and Cork held out to win by 0–13 to 0–12. It was Murray's sole All-Ireland medal.

Murray won a second Munster medal in 2000, as Cork retained their title following a 0–23 to 3–12 defeat of Tipperary.

Following the conclusion of the 2002 championship, Murray left the Cork panel.

=== Inter-provincial ===
Murray was picked for the Munster inter-provincial team in 1995. He won his sole Railway Cup medal that year as Munster narrowly defeated Ulster by 0–13 to 1–9.

== Honours ==
Cork

- All-Ireland Senior Hurling Championship: 1999
- Munster Senior Hurling Championship: 1999, 2000
- Munster Under-21 Hurling Championship: 1991, 1993
- Munster Minor Hurling Championship: 1990

Munster

- Railway Cup (1): 1995
