= Ned Porter =

Irish hurler

Personal information
- Native name: Éamonn Póirtéir (Irish)
- Nickname: Ned
- Born: Edward Porter; 25 April 1912 Dillon's Cross, Cork, Ireland
- Died: 2 May 1978 (aged 66) Dillon's Cross, Cork, Ireland
- Occupation: Bootmaker employee

Sport
- Sport: Hurling
- Position: Goalkeeper
Clubs
- Years: Club
- 1931-1940 1938-1940; 1947 1941-1943 1944-1947: Brian Dillons; Seandún; Glen Rovers; Brian Dillons
Club titles
- Cork titles: 1
Inter-county
Years	County	Apps (scores)
1939-1942	Cork	4 (0-00)
Inter-county titles
- Munster titles: 1
- All-Irelands: 1
- NHL: 0

Edward Porter (25 April 1912 – 2 May 1978) was an Irish hurler. At club level he played with Brian Dillons, Glen Rovers and Seandún and was also a member of the Cork senior hurling team. Porter usually lined out as a goalkeeper.

== Club career ==
Born in the Dillon's Cross area on the northside of Cork, Porter first played hurling at juvenile and underage levels with the Brian Dillons club. By 1931 he had progressed onto the club's junior team. Porter quickly established himself as the team's first-choice goalkeeper and won three successive City JHC titles in that position between 1936 and 1938. The last of these victories was converted into a Cork JHC title after a defeat of Cloughduv in the 1938 final. Porter's performances for his club earned a call-up to divisional side Seandún.

Porter transferred to the nearby Glen Rovers club in 1941 and was an unused substitute on the team that beat Ballincollig in that year's senior final. He remained with the club for only a few seasons, lining out in the full-back line due to the dominance of Dave Creedon in goal. Porter eventually ended his club career back with the Brian Dillons club.

== Inter-county career ==
Porter's performances at club level earned his inclusion on the Cork junior hurling team. He was an unused substitute during Cork's unsuccessful 1934 Munster JHC campaign. After a number of seasons off the team, Porter was back with the junior team as first-choice goalkeeper for the 1939 Munster JHC. AFter the Cork junior team's exit from the championship, he was immediately drafted onto the Cork senior hurling team and was an unused substitute when Cork beat Limerick in the 1939 Munster final. Porter was again listed amongst the substitutes for Cork's 1939 All-Ireland final defeat by Kilkenny.

After missing the 1940 Munster JHC, Porter was once again back with the Cork junior team for the All-Ireland series. He claimed his first national silverware when Cork beat Galway in the 1940 All-Ireland junior final. Porter replaced Jim Buttimer as first-choice goalkeeper with the senior team in advance of the 1942 Munster SHC. After claiming a Munster Championship medal on the field of play, he ended the season by winning an All-Ireland medal following Cork's defeat of Dublin in the 1942 All-Ireland final.

== Death ==
Porter died at his residence in Dillon's Cross on 2 May 1978, aged 66.

== Honours ==
Brian Dillons

- Cork Junior Hurling Championship: 1938
- City Junior Hurling Championship: 1936, 1937, 1938

Glen Rovers

- Cork Senior Hurling Championship: 1941

Cork

- All-Ireland Senior Hurling Championship: 1942
- Munster Senior Hurling Championship: 1942
- All-Ireland Junior Hurling Championship: 1940
- Munster Junior Hurling Championship: 1940
