= Bertie Murphy =

Irish hurler and Gaelic games administrator (1909–1999)

Personal information
- Native name: Beircheart Ó Murchú (Irish)
- Nickname: Bertie
- Born: 17 February 1909 Glounthaune, County Cork, Ireland
- Died: 6 May 1999 (aged 90) Glanmire, County Cork, Ireland
- Occupation: Factory operator

Sport
- Sport: Hurling
Clubs
- Years: Club
- Glanmire; Sarsfields
Club titles
- Cork titles: 0
Inter-county
- Years: County
- Cork
Inter-county titles
- Munster titles: 0
- All-Irelands: 0
- NHL: 0

Bartholomew Murphy (17 February 1909 - 6 May 1999) was an Irish hurler and Gaelic footballer. He lined out with club sides Sarsfields and Glanmire, and at the inter-county level with Cork. Murphy also served as an administrator and selector.

== Playing career ==
Murphy first played Gaelic games as a schoolboy and won his first medal with Glounthaune NS in a school's league in 1923. He progressed to adult level with the Glanmire-Sarsfields Gaelic football and hurling clubs and won six East Cork JFC titles in a nine-year period before winning a Cork JFC title in 1937. Murphy also won a Kelleher Shield with Glanmire in 1940.

Murphy first appeared on the inter-county scene with Cork as a member of the junior team. He won a Munster JHC medal in 1929. Murphy later played alongside his brothers Tom and Jim with the senior team and made a number of appearances in tournament and challenge games.

== Post-playing career ==
Murphy served as treasurer of the East Cork Board between 1944 and 1947 and was his club's board delegate for a number of years. He also served as secretary of the Sarsfields club and was club president at the time of his death.

Murphy was also involved in team management and coaching and was a selector on numerous inter-county teams. His first success was in 1951 when he was part of the selection committee for Cork's All-Ireland MHC triumph. Murphy was a senior team selector the following year as Cork claimed the All-Ireland SHC title. He was a junior team selector for All-Ireland JHC triumphs in 1955 and 1958. Murphy's last inter-county success was an All-Ireland U21HC title in 1973. He was also a selector when the Imokilly senior football team won Cork SFC titles in 1984 and 1986.

== Personal life and death ==
Murphy married Molly O'Donovan in 1942 and had six children. Two of his sons, Bertie Óg and Tadhg, lined out with Glanmire, Sarsfields and at inter-county level with Cork. His grandson, Tadhg Óg Murphy, was also a Sarsfields and Cork hurler.

Murphy died on 6 May 1999, at the age of 90.

== Honours ==
=== Player ===
Glanmire

- Cork Junior Football Championship: 1937
- East Cork Junior Football Championship: 1929, 1930, 1932, 1933, 1934, 1937

Cork

- Munster Junior Hurling Championship: 1929

=== Selector ===
Imokilly

- Cork Senior Football Championship: 1984, 1986

Cork

- All-Ireland Senior Hurling Championship: 1952
- Munster Senior Hurling Championship: 1952
- All-Ireland Junior Hurling Championship: 1955, 1958
- Munster Junior Hurling Championship: 1955, 1958
- All-Ireland Under-21 Hurling Championship: 1973
- Munster Under-21 Hurling Championship: 1973
- All-Ireland Minor Hurling Championship: 1951
- Munster Minor Hurling Championship: 1951
