= Declan Goode =

Irish hurler (1913–1998)

Personal information
- Nickname: Dec
- Born: 4 June 1913 Dungarvan, County Waterford, Ireland
- Died: 4 January 1998 (aged 84) Dungarvan, County Waterford, Ireland
- Occupation: Draper
- Height: 5 ft 8 in (173 cm)

Sport
- Sport: Dual player
- Position: Full-forward
Club
- Years: Club
- Dungarvan
Club titles
- Waterford titles: 1
Inter-county
- Years: County
- Waterford
Inter-county titles
- Munster titles: 1
- All-Irelands: 0
- NHL: 0

Declan Goode (4 June 1913 – 4 January 1998) was an Irish hurler, Gaelic footballer, referee, administrator and politician. At club level he played with Dungarvan, and also lined out at inter-county level with various Waterford teams.

== Playing career ==
Goode first played Gaelic games to a high standard as a student at Dungarvan CBS. He also lined out at juvenile and underage levels with the Dungarvan club, winning two Waterford MHC titles, before progressing to the senior teams as a dual player. Goode won several Waterford SFC medals as well as a Waterford SHC medal in 1941.

Goode had just turned 16-years-old when he first appeared for Waterford as a member of the minor team. He was part of the team that won the All-Ireland MHC title in 1929. Goode later progressed to the junior team and was an All-Ireland JHC medal-winner in 1931.

As a member of both Waterford's senior teams, Goode was a dual player for much of his career. He claimed a Munster SHC medal in 1938 and was at corner-forward when Waterford suffered a defeat by Dublin in that year's All-Ireland final.

Goode's dual player status also extended to the Munster team. He won a Railway Cup medal with the province's hurlers in 1940, however, his four-year tenure with the Gaelic football team was less successful.

== Post-playing career ==
Goode was still an active player when he was elected Secretary of the Waterford County Board in 1938. He spent 33 years in that role, during which time he also served with the Munster Council. At the time of his retirement from the board he was elected Honorary Life President. Goode was also a long-standing member of Fianna Fáil. He was a member of Dungarvan Urban District Council, serving as chairman on three occasions, and was a member of Waterford County Council from 1974 to 1985.

== Personal life and death ==
Goode was born in Dungarvan, County Waterford in June 1913. On leaving school he served his apprenticeship with Dan Fraher at his drapery business. Goode later worked at the leather factory, the Chocolate Crumb plant and Sarah Vaccine, a veterinary and medical concern. He then worked at Mulcahy's drapery store for 23 years until its closure.

Goode died on 4 January 1998, at the age of 84.

== Honours ==
Dungarvan

- Waterford Senior Hurling Championship: 1941
- Waterford Minor Hurling Championship: 1929, 1931

Waterford

- Munster Senior Hurling Championship: 1938
- All-Ireland Junior Hurling Championship: 1931
- Munster Junior Hurling Championship: 1931
- All-Ireland Minor Hurling Championship: 1929
- Munster Minor Hurling Championship: 1929

Munster

- Railway Cup: 1940
