= 1954 All-Ireland Junior Hurling Championship =

All Ireland Champions
- Winners: Limerick (3rd win)
- Captain: Mick Carmody

All Ireland Runners-up
- Runners-up: London

Provincial Champions
- Munster: Limerick
- Leinster: Wicklow
- Ulster: Antrim
- Connacht: Galway

The 1954 All-Ireland Junior Hurling Championship was the 33rd staging of the All-Ireland Junior Championship since its establishment by the Gaelic Athletic Association in 1912.

Tipperary entered the championship as the defending champions, however, they were beaten by Limerick in the Munster final.

The All-Ireland final was played on 10 October 1954 at Mitcham Stadium in London, between Limerick and London, in what was their first meeting in a final in 19 years. Limerick won the match by 4–06 to 2–04 to claim their third championship title overall and a first title since 1941.

== Results ==
=== All-Ireland Junior Hurling Championship ===
==== All-Ireland home final ====
22 August 1954 Semi-final	Antrim	2-13 - 2-05	Wicklow	Croke Park

22 August 1954 Semi-final	Limerick	6-08 - 2-08	Galway	Gaelic Grounds

==== All-Ireland home final ====
12 September 1954 Home final	Limerick	3-05 - 1-08	Antrim	Croke Park

==== All-Ireland final ====
10 October 1954 Final	Limerick	4-06 - 2-04	London	Mitcham Stadium
