= 1953 All-Ireland Junior Hurling Championship =

All Ireland Champions
- Winners: Tipperary (7th win)
- Captain: Mick Kenny

All Ireland Runners-up
- Runners-up: Warwickshire

Provincial Champions
- Munster: Tipperary
- Leinster: Offaly
- Ulster: Antrim
- Connacht: Galway

The 1953 All-Ireland Junior Hurling Championship was the 32nd staging of the All-Ireland Junior Championship since its establishment by the Gaelic Athletic Association in 1912.

Dublin entered the championship as the defending champions.

The All-Ireland final was played on 11 October 1953 at Thurles Sportsfield, between Tipperary and Warwickshire, in what was their first meeting in a final. Tipperary won the match by 4-10 to 3-03 to claim their seventh championship title overall and a first title since 1933.

== Results ==
=== All-Ireland Junior Hurling Championship ===
==== All-Ireland semi-finals ====
23 August 1953 Semi-final	Galway	3-05 - 3-05	Tipperary	Ballinasloe Sportsfield

30 August 1953 Semi-final replay	Tipperary	6-08 - 2-04	Galway	St. Brendan's Park

30 August 1953 Semi-final	Antrim	3-03 - 5-00	Offaly	Casement Park

==== All-Ireland home final ====
13 September 1953 Home final	Offaly	1-02 - 1-07	Tipperary	St. Brendan's Park

==== All-Ireland final ====
11 October 1953 Final	Tipperary	4-10 - 1-03	Warwickshire	Thurles Sportsfield
