= 1957 All-Ireland Junior Hurling Championship =

All Ireland Champions
- Winners: Limerick (4th win)
- Captain: Tom O'Donnell

All Ireland Runners-up
- Runners-up: London

Provincial Champions
- Munster: Limerick
- Leinster: Wexford
- Ulster: Antrim
- Connacht: Galway

The 1957 All-Ireland Junior Hurling Championship was the 36th staging of the All-Ireland Junior Championship since its establishment by the Gaelic Athletic Association in 1912.

Kilkenny entered the championship as the defending champions, however, they were beaten in the Leinster Championship.

The All-Ireland final was played on 6 October 1957 at the Gaelic Grounds in Limerick, between Limerick and London, in what was their first meeting in a final in three years. Limerick won the match by 5-12 to 2-05 to claim their fourth championship title overall and a first title since 1954.

== Results ==
=== All-Ireland Junior Hurling Championship ===
==== All-Ireland semi-finals ====
18 August 1954 Semi-final	Galway	2-14 - 3-04	Antrim	Pearse Stadium

25 August 1957 Semi-final	Limerick	6-08 - 5-07	Wexford	Gaelic Grounds

==== All-Ireland home final ====
8 September 1957 Home final	Limerick	7-15 - 5-08	Galway	Croke Park

==== All-Ireland final ====
6 October 1957 Final	Limerick	5-12 - 2-05	London	Gaelic Grounds
