= Christy Hayes =

Irish hurler

Christopher Hayes (September 1931 – 3 March 1990) was an Irish hurler who played as a centre-back for club side New Ireland and at inter-county level with the Dublin senior hurling team.

He played in the 1961 All-Ireland SHC final.

== Honours ==
New Irelands

- Dublin Senior Hurling Championship: 1958, 1959

Dublin

- Leinster Senior Hurling Championship: 1961
- All-Ireland Junior Hurling Championship: 1952
- Leinster Junior Hurling Championship: 1952
