= Mick Quane =

Irish hurler

Personal information
- Native name: Mícheál Ó Cuain (Irish)
- Born: 1934 (age 91–92) Newmarket, County Cork, Ireland
- Height: 5 ft 7 in (170 cm)

Sport
- Sport: Hurling
- Position: Full-forward
Clubs
- Years: Club
- Newmarket; Glen Rovers
Club titles
- Cork titles: 4
Inter-county
Years	County	Apps (scores)
1958-1962	Cork	6 (3-05)
Inter-county titles
- Munster titles: 0
- All-Irelands: 0
- NHL: 0

Michael Quane (born 1934) is an Irish former hurler who played at club level with Glen Rovers and at inter-county level with the Cork senior hurling team. He usually lined out as a forward.

== Playing career ==
Quane first came to prominence with the Newmarket club before transferring to Glen Rovers in Cork. He first lined out with the senior team in 1955 and won four Cork SHC titles in total. Quane first appeared on the inter-county scene as a member of the Cork junior hurling team that won the All-Ireland JHC title in 1955. He captained the juniors to a second All-Ireland crown in 1958, while also being drafted onto the Cork senior hurling team that year. Quane went on to line out in three successive Munster finals without success.

== Honours ==
Glen Rovers

- Cork Senior Hurling Championship: 1958, 1959, 1960, 1962

Cork

- All-Ireland Junior Hurling Championship: 1955, 1958(c)
- Munster Junior Hurling Championship: 1955, 1958 (c)

Achievements
Preceded by Tom O'Donnell	All-Ireland Junior Hurling Final winning captain 1958	Succeeded by Willie Duffy
