= Mick Fleming (hurler) =

Irish hurler (1933–2024)

Personal information
- Native name: Mícheál Pléimeann (Irish)
- Born: 24th November 1933 [Kilmacow], County Kilkenny, Ireland
- Died: 23 December 2024 (aged 91) Waterford, Ireland
- Height: 5 ft 10 in (178 cm)

Sport
- Sport: Hurling
- Position: Centre-forward
Club
- Years: Club
- St Senan's
Club titles
- Kilkenny titles: 0
Inter-county
- Years: County
- 1956-1959: Kilkenny
Inter-county titles
- Leinster titles: 2
- All-Irelands: 0
- NHL: 0

Michael Fleming (1933 – 23 December 2024) was an Irish hurler. At club level, he played with St Senan's and at inter-county level played for Kilkenny at various levels.

== Career ==
Fleming first played hurling at club level with St Senan's. He won a Kilkenny JHC medal in 1956 following a 6-09 to 4-06 defeat of St Finbarr's, Castleinch in the final.

At inter-county level, Fleming first played for Kilkenny as a member of the junior team. He won a Leinster JHC medal before later lining out in Kilkenny's 5-02 to 2-08 defeat of London in the 1956 All-Ireland junior final. Fleming made his senior team debut in a National Hurling League game against Waterford in March 1956. He was later dropped from the team but recalled in October 1957 and won back-to-back Leinster SHC medals in 1958 and 1959. Fleming lined out at centre-forward when Kilkenny were beaten by Waterford in the 1959 All-Ireland final replay.

== Death ==
Fleming died on 23 December 2024, at the age of 91.

== Honours ==
St Senan's

- Kilkenny Junior Hurling Championship: 1956

Kilkenny

- Leinster Senior Hurling Championship: 1958, 1959
- All-Ireland Junior Hurling Championship: 1956
- Leinster Junior Hurling Championship: 1956
