= Bobby Dineen =

Irish hurler and Gaelic footballer

Personal information
- Native name: Roibeárd Ó Duinnín (Irish)
- Nickname: Bobby
- Born: Robert Joseph Dineen; 5 January 1919 Midleton, County Cork, Ireland
- Died: 11 November 1984 (aged 65) Wilton, Cork, Ireland
- Occupation: Roman Catholic priest
- Height: 5 ft 9 in (175 cm)

Sport
- Sport: Hurling
- Position: Centre-forward
Clubs
- Years: Club
- Midleton; Fermoy
Club titles
- Cork titles: 0
Inter-county
Years	County	Apps (scores)
1939-1940	Cork	4 (1-00)
Inter-county titles
- Munster titles: 1
- All-Irelands: 0
- NHL: 0

Robert Joseph Dineen (5 January 1919 – 11 November 1984) was an Irish hurler and coach. At club level he played with Midleton and Fermoy and was also a member of the Cork senior hurling team.

== Club career ==
Born in Midleton, County Cork, Dineen first played hurling and Gaelic football as a student at St. Colman's College in Fermoy. He also won a South of Ireland schools tennis championship as a schoolboy. Dineen later played hurling at juvenile and underage levels with St. Enda's and won the East Cork MHC title in 1936 before being beaten by Glen Rovers for the county honours. He also joined the Midleton senior team, however, his studies for the priesthood impacted on his playing career and his one and only championship game was the 1938 semi-final defeat of Sarsfields. Dineen later lined out with the Fermoy club and was part of their senior team that lost successive county finals to Clonakilty in 1942 and 1943.

== Inter-county career ==
Dineen's performances at juvenile level with St. Enda's resulted in him being drafted onto the Cork minor hurling team. His debut season saw Cork secure the Munster Championship title before suffering one-point defeat by Kilkenny in the 1936 All-Ireland minor final. Dineen was one of the mainstays of the team once again the following year and ended his two-year association with the team by winning an All-Ireland medal after an 8-05 to 0-02 defeat of Kilkenny in the 1937 All-Ireland minor final.

Dineen earned an immediate call-up to the Cork junior hurling team for the 1938 season. He won a Munster JHC title that year but his academic studies resulted in him missing the subsequent All-Ireland final defeat by London. Dineen's progression to the Cork senior hurling team soon followed. He made his debut at centre-forward in the 1939 Munster SHC semi-final defeat of Waterford. Dineen was a regular throughout the championship which ended with a defeat by Kilkenny in the 1939 All-Ireland final. His academic studies once again impacted on his playing career and he left the Cork team in 1940. Dineen's performances with the Fermoy club earned his inclusion on the Cork senior football team for the 1943 Munster SFC, however, he declined to line out.

== Coaching career ==
During his tenure as a member of the teaching staff at St. Colman's College in Fermoy, Dineen was heavily involved in coaching various teams. In 1949 he trained the college's senior team to the Harty Cup title after a defeat of St. Flannan's College.

== Personal life and death ==
After Dineen's ordination in 1944, he joined the teaching staff of St. Colman's College in Fermoy. In 1957 he became curate at Mitchelstown, remaining there for 15 years until he was appointed parish priest in Lisgoold. Dineen died after a short illness on 11 November 1984, aged 65.

== Honours ==
=== Player ===
St. Enda's

- East Cork Minor Hurling Championship: 1936

Cork

- Munster Senior Hurling Championship: 1939
- Munster Junior Hurling Championship: 1938
- All-Ireland Minor Hurling Championship: 1937
- Munster Minor Hurling Championship: 1936, 1937

=== Coach ===
St. Colman's College

- Dr. Harty Cup: 1949
