= 1958 All-Ireland Junior Hurling Championship =

1958 inter-county junior hurling championship

All Ireland Champions
- Winners: Cork (8th win)
- Captain: Mick Quane

All Ireland Runners-up
- Runners-up: Warwickshire

Provincial Champions
- Munster: Cork
- Leinster: Kilkenny
- Ulster: Antrim
- Connacht: Roscommon

The 1958 All-Ireland Junior Hurling Championship was the 37th staging of the All-Ireland Junior Championship since its establishment by the Gaelic Athletic Association in 1912.

Limerick entered the championship as the defending champions.

The All-Ireland final was played on 5 October 1958 at Glebe Farm in Birmingham, between Cork and Warwickshire, in what was their first meeting in the final since 1955. Cork won the match by 7-10 to 4-02 to claim their eighth championship title overall and a first title since 1955.

== All-Ireland Junior Hurling Championship ==
=== All-Ireland semi-finals ===
24 August 1958 Semi-final	Kilkenny	1-12 - 3-07	Cork	Nowlan Park

24 August 1958 Semi-final	Antrim	3-05 - 3-05	Roscommom	Casement Park

31 August 1958 Semi-final replay	Antrim	4-05 - 1-05	Roscommom	Páirc Tailteann

=== All-Ireland home final ===
14 September 1958 Home final	Cork	3-11 - 3-05	Antrim	Croke Park

=== All-Ireland final ===
5 October 1958 Final	Warwickshire	4-02 - 7-10	Cork	Glebe Farm
