= 1937 All-Ireland Junior Hurling Championship =

All Ireland Champions
- Winners: Dublin (2nd win)
- Captain: Peadar McMahon

All Ireland Runners-up
- Runners-up: London

Provincial Champions
- Munster: Cork
- Leinster: Dublin
- Ulster: Not Played
- Connacht: Galway

The 1937 All-Ireland Junior Hurling Championship was the 20th staging of the All-Ireland Junior Championship since its establishment by the Gaelic Athletic Association in 1912.

Westmeath entered the championship as the defending champions; however, they were beaten in the Leinster Championship.

The All-Ireland final was played on 3 October 1937 at Croke Park between Dublin and London, marking their first final in five years. Dublin won the match by 7–08 to 3–06 to claim their second championship title overall and the first title since 1932.

== Results ==
=== All-Ireland Junior Hurling Championship ===
==== All-Ireland semi-finals ====
8 August 1937 Semi-final	Dublin	8-05 - 1-01	Antrim	Breffni Park

29 August 1937 Semi-final	Galway	3-04 - 2-06	Cork	St. Cronan's Park

==== All-Ireland home final ====
19 September 1937 Home final	Dublin	6-06 - 3-03	Galway	Nowlan Park

==== All-Ireland final ====
3 October 1937 Final	Dublin	7-08 - 3-06	London	Croke Park
