= 1934 All-Ireland Junior Hurling Championship =

All Ireland Champions
- Winners: Waterford (2nd win)
- Captain: Gerry Kehoe

All Ireland Runners-up
- Runners-up: London

Provincial Champions
- Munster: Waterford
- Leinster: Kildare
- Ulster: Not Played
- Connacht: Galway

The 1934 All-Ireland Junior Hurling Championship was the 17th staging of the All-Ireland Junior Championship since its establishment by the Gaelic Athletic Association in 1912.

Tipperary entered the championship as the defending champions, however, they were beaten by Cork in the Munster first round.

The All-Ireland final was played on 4 November 1934 at St. Conleth's Park in Newbridge, between Waterford and London, in what was their first ever meeting in a final. Waterford won the match by 3-05 to 3-03 to claim their second championship title overall and a first title since 1931.

== Results ==
=== All-Ireland Junior Hurling Championship ===
==== All-Ireland semi-finals ====
26 August 1934 Semi-final	Waterford	4-05 - 3-04	Galway	Cusack Park

16 September 1934 Semi-final	Antrim	4-05 - 6-06	Kildare	Corrigan Park

==== All-Ireland home final ====
14 October 1934 Home final	Waterford	5-08 - 1-03	Kildare	Wexford Park

==== All-Ireland final ====
4 November 1934 Final	Waterford	3-05 - 3-03	London	St. Conleth's Park
