= 2004 All-Ireland Junior Hurling Championship =

All Ireland Champions
- Winners: Meath (6th win)
- Captain: David Troy
- Manager: Martin Curran

All Ireland Runners-up
- Runners-up: Down

Provincial Champions
- Munster: Not Played
- Leinster: Meath
- Ulster: Down
- Connacht: Mayo

The 2004 All-Ireland Junior Hurling Championship was the 83rd and final staging of the All-Ireland Junior Championship since its establishment by the Gaelic Athletic Association in 1912.

Mayo entered the championship as the defending champions, however, they were beaten by Meath in the All-Ireland semi-final.

The All-Ireland final was played on 14 August 2004 at St. Tiernach's Park in Clones, between Meath and Down, in what was their first ever meeting in a final. Meath won the match by 1-10 to 1-06 to claim their sixth championship title overall and a first title in five years.

== Teams ==
=== General Information ===
County	Last junior provincial title	Last championship title	Provincial championship
Down	1993	1964	Ulster Junior Hurling Championship
Fermanagh	1994	—	Ulster Junior Hurling Championship
Kildare	1966	1966	Leinster Junior Hurling Championship
Kilkenny	1996	1995	Leinster Junior Hurling Championship
London	—	1963	British Junior Hurling Championship
Longford	—	—	Leinster Junior Hurling Championship
Louth	1973	1977	Leinster Junior Hurling Championship
Mayo	1967	2003	Connacht Junior Hurling Championship
Meath	2003	1999	Leinster Junior Hurling Championship
Sligo	1973	—	Connacht Junior Hurling Championship

== Provincial Championships ==
=== Connacht Junior Hurling Championship ===
==== Connacht final ====
20 June 2004 Final	Mayo	1-10 - 2-03	Sligo	Páirc Seán Mac Diarmada

=== Leinster Junior Hurling Championship ===
==== Leinster quarter-finals ====
9 June 2004 Quarter-final	Kilkenny	0-03 - 2-10	Kildare	Nowlan Park

==== Leinster semi-finals ====
30 June 2004 Semi-final	Meath	4-19 - 1-07	Kildare	Páirc Tailteann

30 June 2004 Semi-final	Longford	0-14 - 1-09	Louth	Michael Fay Park

==== Leinster final ====
20 July 2004 Final	Meath	4-14 - 2-07	Longford	Páirc Tailteann

=== Ulster Junior Hurling Championship ===
==== Ulster final ====
9 June 2004 Final	Down	1-11 - 1-09	Fermanagh	St. Tiernach's Park

== All-Ireland Junior Hurling Championship ==
=== Bracket ===
Semi-Finals
Mayo	3-03
Meath	2-15
Down	3-13
London	3-05

Final
Meath	1-10
Down	1-06

=== All-Ireland semi-finals ===
31 July 2004 Semi-final	Mayo	3-03 - 2-15	Meath	Dr. Hyde Park

31 July 2004 Semi-final	Down	3-13 - 3-05	London	Páirc Esler

=== All-Ireland final ===
==== Final ====
14 August 2004 Final	Meath	1-10 - 1-06	Down	St. Tiernach's Park

== Statistics ==
=== Scoring events ===
- Widest winning margin: 21 points
  - Meath 4-19 - 1-07 Kildare (Leinster semi-final)
- Most goals in a match: 6
  - Meath 4-14 - 2-07 Longford (Leinster final)
  - Down 3-13 - 3-05 London (Semi-final)
- Most points in a match: 26
  - Meath 4-19 - 1-07 Kildare (Leinster semi-final)
- Most goals by one team in a match: 4
  - Meath 4-19 - 1-07 Kildare (Leinster semi-final)
  - Meath 4-14 - 2-07 Longford (Leinster final)
- Most points by one team in a match: 19
  - Meath 4-19 - 1-07 Kildare (Leinster semi-final)
- Highest aggregate score: 41 points
  - Meath 4-19 - 1-07 Kildare (Leinster semi-final)
- Lowest aggregate score: 19 points
  - Kilkenny 0-03 - 2-10 Kildare (Leinster quarter-final)

== Miscellaneous ==
- Meath win their sixth All-Ireland Junior Hurling Championship.

== See also ==
- 2004 All-Ireland Senior Hurling Championship
- 2004 All-Ireland Intermediate Hurling Championship
