= Tadhg Murphy =

Tadhg Murphy may refer to:

- Tadhg Murphy (dual player) (born 1956), Irish hurler and Gaelic footballer for Cork
- Tadhg Óg Murphy (born 1986), his son, Irish hurler for Cork
- Tadhg Murphy (Tipperary hurler) (born 1951), Irish hurler for Tipperary
- Tadhg Murphy (actor), Irish actor
