= 1968 Cork Junior Hurling Championship =

Irish hurling competition

- Dates: 15 September - 17 November 1968
- Teams: 7
- Champions: Newtownshandrum (2nd title); Tim McAuliffe (captain)
- Runners-up: Inniscarra; Tomás Ryan (captain)

Tournament statistics
- Matches played: 6
- Goals scored: 37 (6.17 per match)
- Points scored: 84 (14 per match)
- Top scorer(s): B. O'Connell (2-09)

The 1968 Cork Junior Hurling Championship was the 71st staging of the Cork Junior Hurling Championship since its establishment by the Cork County Board. The championship ran from 15 September to 17 November 1968.

The final was played on 17 November 1968 at Páirc Mac Gearailt in Fermoy, between Newtownshandrum and Inniscarra, in what was their first ever meeting in the final. Newtownshandrum won the match by 1-09 to 2-04 to claim their second championship title overall and a first title in 22 years.

== Qualification ==
Division	Championship	Champions
Avondhu	North Cork Junior A Hurling Championship	Newtownshandrum
Carbery	South West Junior A Hurling Championship	Courcey Rovers
Carrigdhoun	South East Junior A Hurling Championship	Valley Rovers
Duhallow	Duhallow Junior A Hurling Championship	Kanturk
Imokilly	East Cork Junior A Hurling Championship	Bride Rovers
Muskerry	Mid Cork Junior A Hurling Championship	Inniscarra
Seandún	City Junior A Hurling Championship	Brian Dillons

== Results ==
=== Quarter-finals ===
15 September 1968 Quarter-final	Newtownshandrum	3-07 - 2-08	Kanturk	Milford Grounds
	M Reidy 2-0, A Noonan 0-5, C Morrissey 1-1, L Ryan 1-0.		D Murphy 1-2, D Kenneally 1-0, S O'Connell 0-3, B Quinn 0-2, D O'Sullivan 0-1.

6 October 1968 Quarter-final	Courcey Rovers	5-08 - 2-05	Bride Rovers	Cork Athletic Grounds
	T Murphy 3-1, G Collins 1-1, T Collins 1-0, L Hurley 0-2, V O'Donovan 0-1, C Corcoran 0-1, W O'Donovan 0-1, T O'Mahony 0-1.		S Barry 1-5, T O'Riordan 1-0.	Referee: P Cronin (St. Finbarr's)

13 October 1968 Quarter-final	Brian Dillons	7-12 - 3-09	Valley Rovers	Ballinhassig Grounds
	B O'Connell 2-7, P Curley 2-1, E Dorney 1-1, B O'Brien 1-0, G McDonnell 1-0, G O'Sullivan 0-2, D Hannon 0-1.		David McCarthy 1-6, J Connors 2-1, A O'Leary 0-1, M Ryan 0-1.

=== Semi-finals ===
27 October 1968 Semi-final	Newtownshandrum	4-04 - 2-04	Brian Dillons	Bishop Casey Memorial Park
	C Morrissey 2-1, P Morrissey 2-1, A Noonan 0-2.		J O'Sullivan 1-0, E Dorney 1-0, B O'Connell 0-2, P Curley 0-1, D Hannon 0-1.

27 October 1968 Semi-final	Inniscarra	4-09 - 2-05	Courcey Rovers	Cloughduv Grounds
	D Brennan 2-1, T Ryan 1-4, T O'Riordan 1-1, O O'Brien 0-1, H O'Sullivan 0-1, O O'Brien 0-1.		G Collins 2-0, J O'Donovan 0-3, L Hurley 0-2.	Referee: J Cotter (St. Finbarr's)

=== Final ===
17 November 1968 Final	Newtownshandrum	1-09 - 2-04	Inniscarra	Páirc Mac Gearailt
	A Noonan 0-7, P Twomey 1-0, D Keating 0-1, J Reidy 0-1.		M Ryan 1-2, J Brennan 1-1, T Ryan 0-1.	Referee: F Murphy (Blackrock)
