= Gil Morgan (rugby league) =

Wales international rugby league footballer

Personal information
- Full name: Gilbert Morgan
- Born: 15 April 1908 Llanhilleth, Wales
- Died: 11 August 1973 (aged 65) Dewsbury, England

Playing information

Rugby union
Club
Years	Team	Pld	T	G	FG	P
	Llanhilleth RFC
	Abertillery RFC
	Total	0	0	0	0	0
Representative
Years	Team	Pld	T	G	FG	P
	Crawshays RFC

Rugby league
- Position: Second-row
Club
Years	Team	Pld	T	G	FG	P
1932–35	Halifax	41	7	4	0	29
1935–36	Acton and Willesden
1936–37	Streatham and Mitcham
1937–≥38	Dewsbury
	Total	41	7	4	0	29
Representative
Years	Team	Pld	T	G	FG	P
1938	Wales	1	0	0	0	0

Gilbert Morgan (15 April 1908 – 11 August 1973), also known by the nickname of "Gil", was a Welsh rugby union and professional rugby league footballer who played in the 1930s. He played invitational level rugby union (RU) for Crawshays RFC, and at club level for Llanhilleth RFC, and representative level rugby league (RL) for Wales, winning one international cap in 1938, and at club level for Streatham and Mitcham, Halifax and Dewsbury, as a second-row. Gilbert played for Streatham and Mitcham in the early 1930s before moving to Halifax from around 1935 until 1937 then joining Dewsbury in 1938.

== Background ==
Gil Morgan was born and brought up in Llanhilleth, Monmouthshire, and moved to Yorkshire in the mid-1930s. Gil Morgan and his wife settled in Dewsbury, raising their three sons who all currently live in the area. After retiring from rugby, he worked in carpet mills, and he died aged 65 in Dewsbury, West Riding of Yorkshire, England.

== Club career ==
After playing a reserve game as an un-named triallist, Morgan joined Halifax from Welsh rugby union club Abertillery RFC in September 1932. In 1935, he joined the newly formed London-based club Acton and Willesden. before joining Streatham and Mitcham a year later. In February 1937, he returned to Yorkshire and signed for Dewsbury.

== International honours ==
Gil Morgan won a cap for Wales against France while at Dewsbury in 1938.
