= 1977 All-Ireland Junior Hurling Championship =

All Ireland Champions
- Winners: Louth (2nd win)
- Captain: Pat Hartnett

All Ireland Runners-up
- Runners-up: Fermanagh
- Captain: Tom Reihill

Provincial Champions
- Munster: Not Played
- Leinster: Not Played
- Ulster: Not Played
- Connacht: Not Played

The 1977 All-Ireland Junior Hurling Championship was the 56th staging of the All-Ireland Junior Championship since its establishment by the Gaelic Athletic Association in 1912. Louth began the competition as defending champions, having defeated Mayo in the 1976 decider. Louth beat Fermanagh in the 1977 final to retain their title.

== Format ==
Provincial hurling championships were not held at junior level in 1977. The winners of the respective 'A' and 'B' sections of the National Hurling League Division 3 would go forward to contest the All-Ireland final.

Louth reached their third consecutive final after a League campaign which included victories against Derry (twice), Monaghan and Tyrone. Fermanagh's path to the final included wins against Donegal, Sligo, Leitrim, and Mayo.

== All-Ireland final ==
Louth led by seven points at half-time (1-08 to 1-01) and at the final whistle emerged as winners by a ten-point margin.

=== Match details ===
13 November 1977	Louth	1-14 - 2-04	Fermanagh	Emmet Park, Carrickmacross
	Kerrigan (0-4), Rice (1-0), Murphy (0-3), Ryan, Lowry (0-2 each), Melia, Mulkearns, Reilly (0-1 each)		Baker (2-0), Corrigan (0-2), Daly, Doran (0-1 each)	Referee: Clem Foley (Dublin)

GK	1	Pat Hartnett (Naomh Moninne) (c)
RCB	2	Mal Begley (Naomh Moninne)
FB	3	Joe Delaney (Naomh Moninne)
LCB	4	Con McGinley (Wolfe Tones)
RHB	5	Damien Callan (Naomh Moninne)
CHB	6	Peadar Fahy (Naomh Colmcille)
LHB	7	Seán Walsh (Naomh Colmcille)
MF	8	Patsy Murphy (Naomh Moninne)
MF	9	Aidan Kerrigan (Naomh Moninne)
RHF	10	Tom Ryan (Naomh Moninne)
CHF	11	Tom Rice (Naomh Colmcille)
LHF	12	Tony Melia (Naomh Colmcille)
RCF	13	Seán Mulkearns (Wolfe Tones)
FF	14	Tadhg Lowry (Wolfe Tones)
LCF	15	Ollie Reilly (Naomh Moninne)
Substitutes:
	16	Jim McGuinness (Naomh Moninne) for McGinley

GK	1	Liam McLoughlin (Erne Gaels)
RCB	2	Eddie Gallagher (Erne Gaels)
FB	3	Raymond Gallagher (Erne Gaels)
LCB	4	Ollie O'Donnell (Lisbellaw St Patrick's)
RHB	5	Tom Reihill (Lisbellaw St Patrick's) (c)
CHB	6	Charlie Cullen (Erne Gaels)
LHB	7	Joe McGoldrick (Lisbellaw St Patrick's)
MF	8	John Doran (Lisbellaw St Patrick's)
MF	9	Aidan Corrigan (Lisbellaw St Patrick's)
RHF	10	Gerry Cleary (Lisbellaw St Patrick's)
CHF	11	Cathal Reihill (Lisbellaw St Patrick's)
LHF	12	Benny Corrigan (Lisbellaw St Patrick's)
RCF	13	Gerard McLoughlin (Erne Gaels)
FF	14	Tom Daly (Erne Gaels)
LCF	15	Matt Hughes (Erne Gaels)
Substitutes:
	16	Finian Baker (Lisbellaw St Patrick's) for G. McLoughlin
