= 1936 All-Ireland Junior Hurling Championship =

All Ireland Champions
- Winners: Westmeath (1st win)
- Captain: Mick McCarthy

All Ireland Runners-up
- Runners-up: Waterford

Provincial Champions
- Munster: Waterford
- Leinster: Westmeath
- Ulster: Not Played
- Connacht: Mayo

The 1936 All-Ireland Junior Hurling Championship was the 19th staging of the All-Ireland Junior Championship since its establishment by the Gaelic Athletic Association in 1912.

Limerick entered the championship as the defending champions, however, they were beaten in the Munster Championship.

The All-Ireland final was played on 13 September 1936 at Croke Park in Dublin, between Westmeath and Waterford, in what was their first ever meeting in a final. Westmeath won the match by 2-05 to 3-01 to claim their first ever championship title.

== Results ==
=== All-Ireland Junior Hurling Championship ===
==== All-Ireland semi-finals ====
| 30 August 1936 Semi-final | Waterford | 5-03 - 4-02 | Mayo | Cusack Park |

| 30 August 1936 Semi-final | Westmeath | 9-04 - 1-01 | Antrim | Drogheda Sportsfield |

==== All-Ireland final ====
| 13 September 1936 Final | Westmeath | 2-05 - 3-01 | Waterford | Croke Park |
