= 1941 All-Ireland Junior Hurling Championship =

All Ireland Champions
- Winners: Limerick (2nd win)
- Captain: Simon O'Riordan

All Ireland Runners-up
- Runners-up: Galway

Provincial Champions
- Munster: Limerick
- Leinster: Kilkenny
- Ulster: Not Played
- Connacht: Not Played

The 1941 All-Ireland Junior Hurling Championship was the 24th staging of the All-Ireland Junior Championship since its establishment by the Gaelic Athletic Association in 1912.

Cork entered the championship as the defending champions, however, they were beaten by Limerick in the Munster semi-final.

The All-Ireland final was played on 21 September 1941 at Cusack Park in Ennis, between Limerick and Galway, in what was their first ever meeting in a final. Limerick won the match by 8-02 to 4-01 to claim their first ever championship title.

== Results ==
=== All-Ireland Junior Hurling Championship ===
==== All-Ireland semi-final ====
| 31 August 1941 Semi-final | Limerick | 6-05 - 1-03 | Wexford | Gaelic Grounds |

==== All-Ireland final ====
| 21 September 1941 Final | Limerick | 8-02 - 4-01 | Galway | Cusack Park |
