= 1952 All-Ireland Junior Hurling Championship =

All Ireland Champions
- Winners: Dublin (3rd win)
- Captain: Liam Skelly

All Ireland Runners-up
- Runners-up: London

Provincial Champions
- Munster: Limerick
- Leinster: Dublin
- Ulster: Antrim
- Connacht: Roscommon

The 1952 All-Ireland Junior Hurling Championship was the 31st staging of the All-Ireland Junior Championship since its establishment by the Gaelic Athletic Association in 1912.

Kilkenny entered the championship as the defending champions, however, they were beaten by Dublin in the Leinster semi-final.

The All-Ireland final was played on 19 October 1952 at New Eltham in London, between Dublin and London, in what was their first meeting in a final in 15 years. Dublin won the match by 3–04 to 2–06 to claim their third championship title overall and a first title since 1937.

== Results ==
=== All-Ireland Junior Hurling Championship ===
==== All-Ireland semi-finals ====
24 August 1952 Semi-final	Antrim	10-04 - 2-01	Roscommon	Corrigan Park

24 August 1952 Semi-final	Dublin	1-14 - 1-11	Limerick	Croke Park

==== All-Ireland home final ====
14 September 1952 Home final	Dublin	4-10 - 2-05	Antrim	Croke Park

==== All-Ireland final ====
19 October 1952 Final	Dublin	3-04 - 2-06	London	New Eltham

== Championship statistics ==
=== Miscellaneous ===
- Roscommon won the Connacht Championship for the first time ever.
