= 1978 Cork Junior Football Championship =

- Teams: 8
- Champions: Kildorrery (1st title)
- Runners-up: Brian Dillons

The 1978 Cork Junior Football Championship was the 80th staging of the Cork Junior Football Championship since its establishment by Cork County Board in 1895.

The final was played on 12 November 1978 at Felix Sarsfield Memorial Park in Watergrasshill, between Kildorrery and Brian Dillons, in what was their first ever meeting in the final. Kildorrery won the match by 3–06 to 1–08 to claim their first ever championship title.

== Results ==
=== Final ===
12 November 1978 Final	Kildorrery	3–06 – 1–08	Brian Dillons	Felix Sarsfield Memorial Park
