= 1939 All-Ireland Junior Hurling Championship =

All Ireland Champions
- Winners: Galway (1st win)

All Ireland Runners-up
- Runners-up: London

Provincial Champions
- Munster: Limerick
- Leinster: Kilkenny
- Ulster: Not Played
- Connacht: Galway

The 1939 All-Ireland Junior Hurling Championship was the 22nd staging of the All-Ireland Junior Championship since its establishment by the Gaelic Athletic Association in 1912.

London entered the championship as the defending champions.

The All-Ireland final was played on 8 October 1939 at Croke Park in Dublin, between Galway and London, in what was their first ever meeting in a final. Galway won the match by 2-06 to 2-02 to claim their first ever championship title.

== Results ==
=== All-Ireland Junior Hurling Championship ===
==== All-Ireland semi-finals ====
20 August 1939 Semi-final	Waterford	2-05 - 3-06	Kilkenny	Davin Park

20 August 1939 Semi-final	Galway	2-14 - 1-03	Antrim	Galway Sportsfield

==== All-Ireland home finals ====
17 September 1939 Home final	Galway	3-08 - 3-08	Kilkenny	St. Brendan's Park

1 October 1939 Home final replay	Galway	4-06 - 4-03	Kilkenny	St. Brendan's Park

==== All-Ireland final ====
8 October 1939 Final	Galway	2-06 - 2-02	London	Croke Park
