= 1940 All-Ireland Junior Hurling Championship =

All Ireland Champions
- Winners: Cork (4th win)
- Captain: Dan Lynch

All Ireland Runners-up
- Runners-up: Galway

Provincial Champions
- Munster: Cork
- Leinster: Wexford
- Ulster: Not Played
- Connacht: Galway

The 1940 All-Ireland Junior Hurling Championship was the 23rd staging of the All-Ireland Junior Championship since its establishment by the Gaelic Athletic Association in 1912.

Galway entered the championship as the defending champions.

The All-Ireland final was played on 25 August 1940 at the Gaelic Grounds in Limerick, between Cork and Galway, in what was their first ever meeting in the final. Cork won the match by 3–03 to 2–01 to claim their fourth championship title overall and a first title since 1925.

== Results ==
=== All-Ireland Junior Hurling Championship ===
==== All-Ireland semi-finals ====
4 August 1940 Semi-final	Galway	7-04 - 1-07	Antrim	Croke Park

4 August 1940 Semi-final	Wexford	4-01 - 5-07	Cork	Wexford Park

==== All-Ireland final ====
25 August 1940 Final	Cork	3-03 - 3-01	Galway	Gaelic Grounds
