= 1938 All-Ireland Junior Hurling Championship =

All Ireland Champions
- Winners: London (1st win)

All Ireland Runners-up
- Runners-up: Cork

Provincial Champions
- Munster: Cork
- Leinster: Offaly
- Ulster: Not Played
- Connacht: Galway

The 1938 All-Ireland Junior Hurling Championship was the 21st staging of the All-Ireland Junior Championship since its establishment by the Gaelic Athletic Association in 1912.

Dublin entered the championship as the defending champions, however, they were beaten in the Leinster Championship.

The All-Ireland final was played on 30 October 1938 at New Eltham, between London and Cork, in what was their first ever meeting in a final. London won the match by 4-04 to 4-01 to claim their first ever championship title.

== Results ==
=== All-Ireland Junior Hurling Championship ===
==== All-Ireland semi-finals ====
21 August 1938 Semi-final	Antrim	6-03 - 6-02	Galway	Croke Park

11 September 1938 Semi-final	Cork	2-10 - 2-04	Offaly	Nowlan Park

==== All-Ireland home final ====
9 October 1938 Home final	Cork	6-05 - 2-04	Antrim	Croke Park

==== All-Ireland final ====
30 October 1938 Final	London	4-04 - 4-01	Cork	New Eltham
