= 1932 All-Ireland Junior Hurling Championship =

All Ireland Champions
- Winners: Dublin (1st win)

All Ireland Runners-up
- Runners-up: London

Provincial Champions
- Munster: Cork
- Leinster: Dublin
- Ulster: Not Played
- Connacht: Galway

The 1932 All-Ireland Junior Hurling Championship was the 15th staging of the All-Ireland Junior Championship since its establishment by the Gaelic Athletic Association in 1912.

Waterford entered the championship as the defending champions, however, they were beaten by Cork in the Munster first round.

The All-Ireland final was played on 30 October 1932 at Drogheda Park, between Dublin and London, in what was their first meeting in a final. Waterford won the match by 8-04 to 2-00 to claim their first ever championship title.

== Results ==
=== All-Ireland Junior Hurling Championship ===
==== All-Ireland semi-finals ====
| 28 August 1932 Semi-final | Galway | 6-08 - 2-05 | Donegal | Sligo Sportsfield |

| 18 September 1932 Semi-final | Dublin | 2-07 - 3-02 | Cork | St. Cronan's Park |

==== All-Ireland home final ====
| 9 October 1932 Home final | Dublin | 6-05 - 3-03 | Galway | St. Cronan's Park |

==== All-Ireland final ====
| 30 October 1932 Final | Dublin | 8-04 - 2-00 | Lancashire | Drogheda Park |
