= 1933 All-Ireland Junior Hurling Championship =

All Ireland Champions
- Winners: Tipperary (6th win)
- Captain: Ned Eade

All Ireland Runners-up
- Runners-up: London

Provincial Champions
- Munster: Tipperary
- Leinster: Laois
- Ulster: Not Played
- Connacht: Galway

The 1933 All-Ireland Junior Hurling Championship was the 16th staging of the All-Ireland Junior Championship since its establishment by the Gaelic Athletic Association in 1912.

Dublin entered the championship as the defending champions.

The All-Ireland final was played on 5 November 1933 at Croke Park in Dublin, between Tipperary and London, in what was their first meeting in a final. Tipperary won the match by 10–01 to 1–04 to claim their sixth championship title overall and a first title since 1930.

== Results ==
=== All-Ireland Junior Hurling Championship ===
==== All-Ireland home final ====
8 October 1933 Home final	Tipperary	8-03 - 1-03	Galway	Portumna Sportsfield

==== All-Ireland final ====
5 November 1933 Final	Tipperary	10-01 - 1-04	London	Croke Park
