= 1956 All-Ireland Junior Hurling Championship =

All Ireland Champions
- Winners: Kilkenny (4th win)
- Captain: S. Tyrrell

All Ireland Runners-up
- Runners-up: London
- Captain: D. Shanahan

Provincial Champions
- Munster: Kerry
- Leinster: Kilkenny
- Ulster: Down
- Connacht: Galway

The 1956 All-Ireland Junior Hurling Championship was the 35th staging of the All-Ireland Junior Championship since its establishment by the Gaelic Athletic Association in 1912.

Cork entered the championship as the defending champions, however, they were beaten by Tipperary in the Munster first round.

The All-Ireland final was played on 30 September 1956 at Eltham Stadium in London, between Kilkenny and London, in what was their first meeting in a final in five years. Kilkenny won the match by 5-02 to 2-08 to claim their fourth championship title overall and a first title since 1951.

== Results ==
=== All-Ireland Junior Hurling Championship ===
==== All-Ireland semi-finals ====
19 August 1956 Semi-final	Galway	3-11 - 5-12	Kilkenny	Balliansloe Sportsfield

26 August 1956 Semi-final	Kerry	7-06 - 2-06	Down	Austin Stack Park

==== All-Ireland home final ====
9 September 1956 Home final	Kilkenny	4-08 - 2-00	Kerry	Thurles Sportsfield

==== All-Ireland final ====
30 September 1956 Final	Kilkenny	5-02 - 2-08	London	Eltham Stadium
