= 1935 All-Ireland Junior Hurling Championship =

All Ireland Champions
- Winners: Limerick (1st win)
- Captain: Micky Cross

All Ireland Runners-up
- Runners-up: London

Provincial Champions
- Munster: Limerick
- Leinster: Kilkenny
- Ulster: Not Played
- Connacht: Galway

The 1935 All-Ireland Junior Hurling Championship was the 18th staging of the All-Ireland Junior Championship since its establishment by the Gaelic Athletic Association in 1912.

Waterford entered the championship as the defending champions, however, they were beaten by Limerick in the Munster final.

The All-Ireland final was played on 13 October 1935 at Mountsfield Park in Catford, between Limerick and London, in what was their first ever meeting in a final. Limerick won the match by 4–09 to 3–03 to claim their first ever championship title.

== Results ==
=== All-Ireland Junior Hurling Championship ===
==== All-Ireland semi-finals ====
8 September 1935 Semi-final	Limerick	6-08 - 0-00	Kilkenny	Waterford Sportsfield

15 September 1935 Semi-final	Antrim	1-02 - 5-02	Galway	Corrigan Park

==== All-Ireland home final ====
29 September 1935 Home final	Limerick	2-05 - 1-02	Galway	St. Brendan's Park

==== All-Ireland final ====
13 October 1935 Final	Limerick	4-09 - 3-03	London	Mountsfield Park
