= Brisbane Road =

Football stadium in East London

Coordinates: 51°33′37″N 0°0′46″W

Brisbane Road The BetWright Stadium
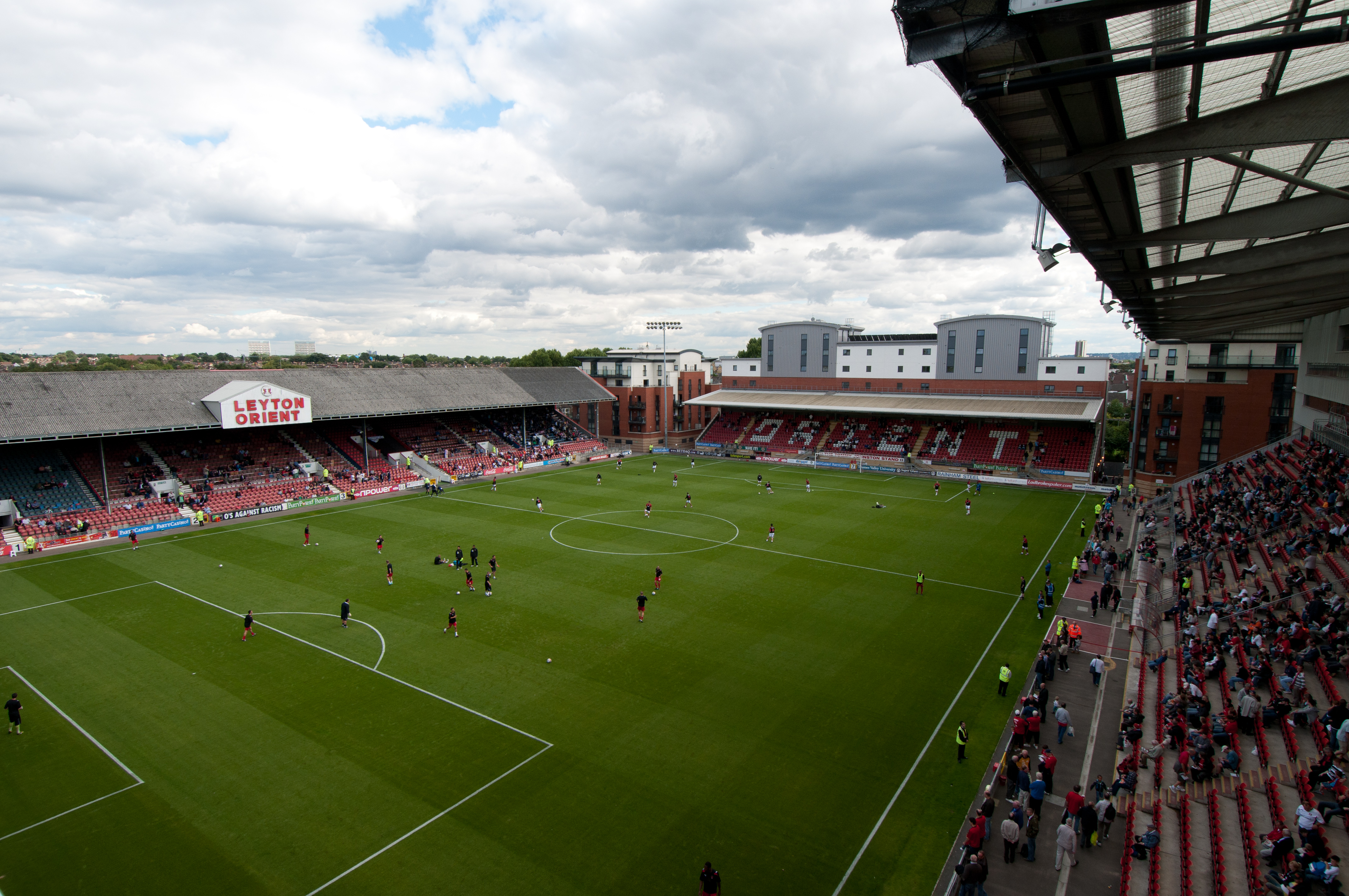
- Interactive map of Brisbane Road; The BetWright Stadium
- Full name: Brisbane Road
- Former names: Osborne Road, The Matchroom Stadium, Breyer Group Stadium, Gaughan Group Stadium, BetWright Stadium
- Location: Leyton, London, England
- Owner: Waltham Forest Council (leased)
- Capacity: 9,271
- Surface: GrassMaster
- Field size: 110 x 76 yards
- Public transit: Leyton

Construction
- Built: c1890s
- Opened: c1890s

Tenants
- Leyton (1905–1937); Leyton Orient (1937–present); Tottenham Hotspur Reserves (2007–2009); Tottenham Hotspur Women (2022–present); London Guard (2027–)

Brisbane Road, currently known as the BetWright Stadium for sponsorship reasons and originally known as Osborne Road, is a football stadium in Leyton, East London, England. It has been the home ground of Leyton Orient since 1937, before which it was the home of amateur football team Leyton, who moved to the Hare and Hounds ground. Since 2022 it has also been home to Tottenham Hotspur Women.

The highest attendance at the ground was 34,345 for the visit of West Ham United in an FA Cup fourth round tie on 25 January 1964. It has hosted a number of England U-16 and England women's team matches. It hosted the 2007–08 FA Women's Premier League Cup final. It was also home of the Tottenham Hotspur Reserves. In 2012 it hosted the final of the inaugural NextGen series, a competition for the academy sides of elite clubs.

== History ==
The stadium has seen several developments in its history, but due to the Second World War the first major improvement was the levelling of a grass bank and crash barrier installation in 1949. The terracing behind the goals was improved again in 1952, 1959 and 1960. In 1956 a small seated stand was dismantled and replaced with a stand from the decrepit Mitcham Stadium, which held 2,600 fans. In 1962, with Leyton Orient gaining promotion to the First Division, another wing was added to the Main Stand, raising the seating capacity to 3,500. In 1978 the West Stand was converted into all-seating. In 1996 the terracing at the southern end of the ground was demolished and used as a car park while National Lottery funding to build a stand was unsuccessfully sought. The South Stand was eventually built in 1999, and was renamed The Tommy Johnston Stand on 5 September 2008.

The ground was previously known as the Breyer Group Stadium for sponsorship reasons, and had previously been named the Matchroom Stadium, after the Matchroom Sport promotions company owned by Orient's chairman at the time, Barry Hearn. Prior to this it was officially named the Leyton Stadium, though fans still referred to it as Brisbane Road. The club registered an interest into moving into the Olympic Stadium following the 2012 Olympics, as the original plan was for this to have a capacity of about 25,000; however, the club's average attendance of about 5,000 meant that this was not a viable move.

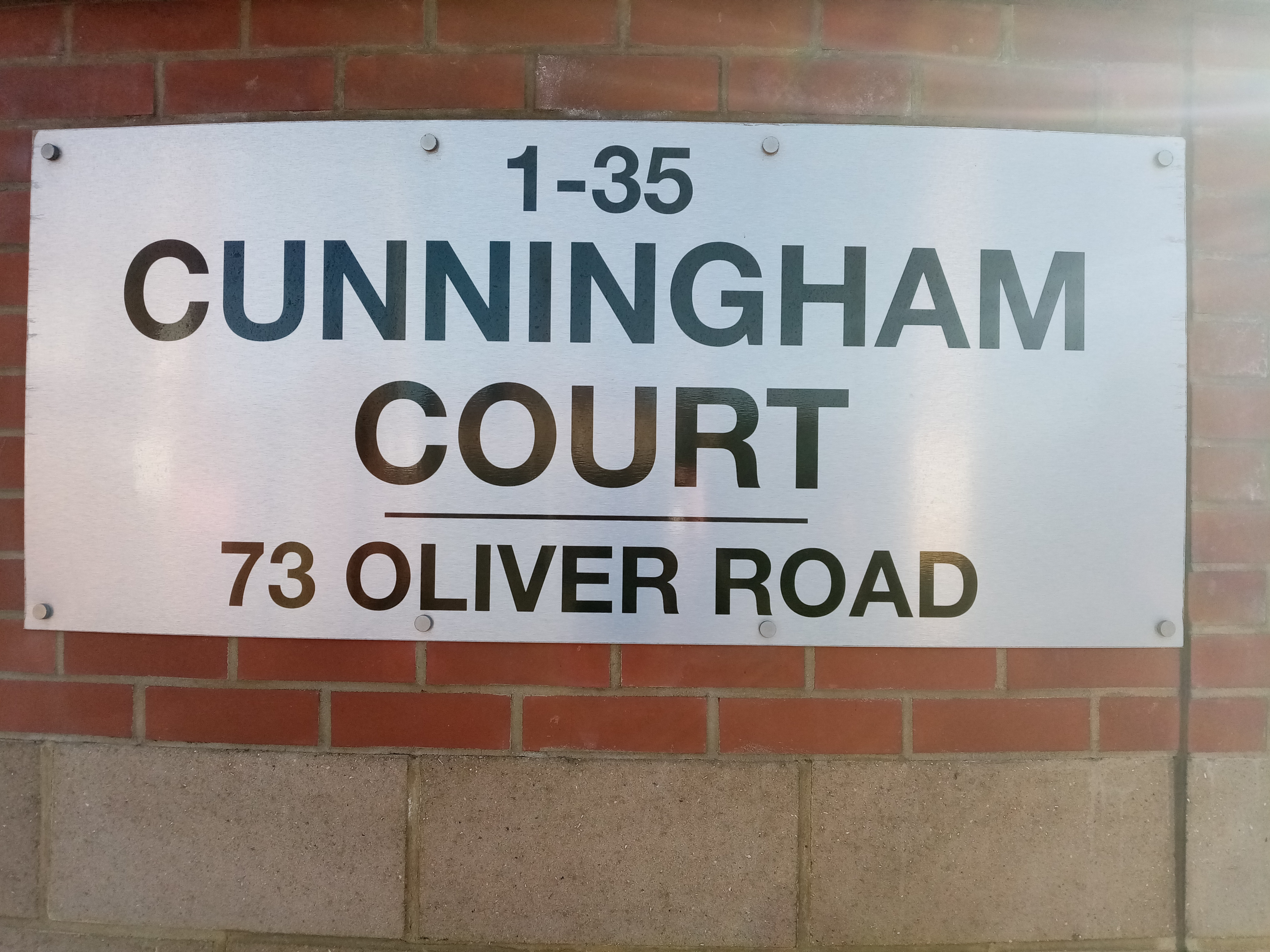
The plaquette of the Cunningham Court

The eventual bids from both West Ham United and Tottenham Hotspur to move into the stadium, with capacity nearer 60,000, effectively ended Orient's interest. Brisbane Road is in very close proximity to both the Olympic Park and also Hackney Marshes. On 6 May 2012, Brisbane Road hosted a Super League rugby league game between London Broncos and Bradford Bulls due to works on the Broncos' home stadium Twickenham Stoop, with Bradford winning 29–22.

During the close season of 2023 a new GrassMaster hybrid pitch was installed.

On 7 December 2023, the stadium was renamed Gaughan Group Stadium, with the club agreeing a three-year sponsorship package with the locally-based Gaughan Group. On 27 March 2025, the stadium reverted to Brisbane Road due to early termination of the agreement.

On 23 May 2025, the stadium was renamed The BetWright Stadium, with the club agreeing a two-year sponsorship package with the UK-licensed sportsbook and casino brand.

== Stands ==
=== Justin Edinburgh Stand ===
Capacity: 2,918

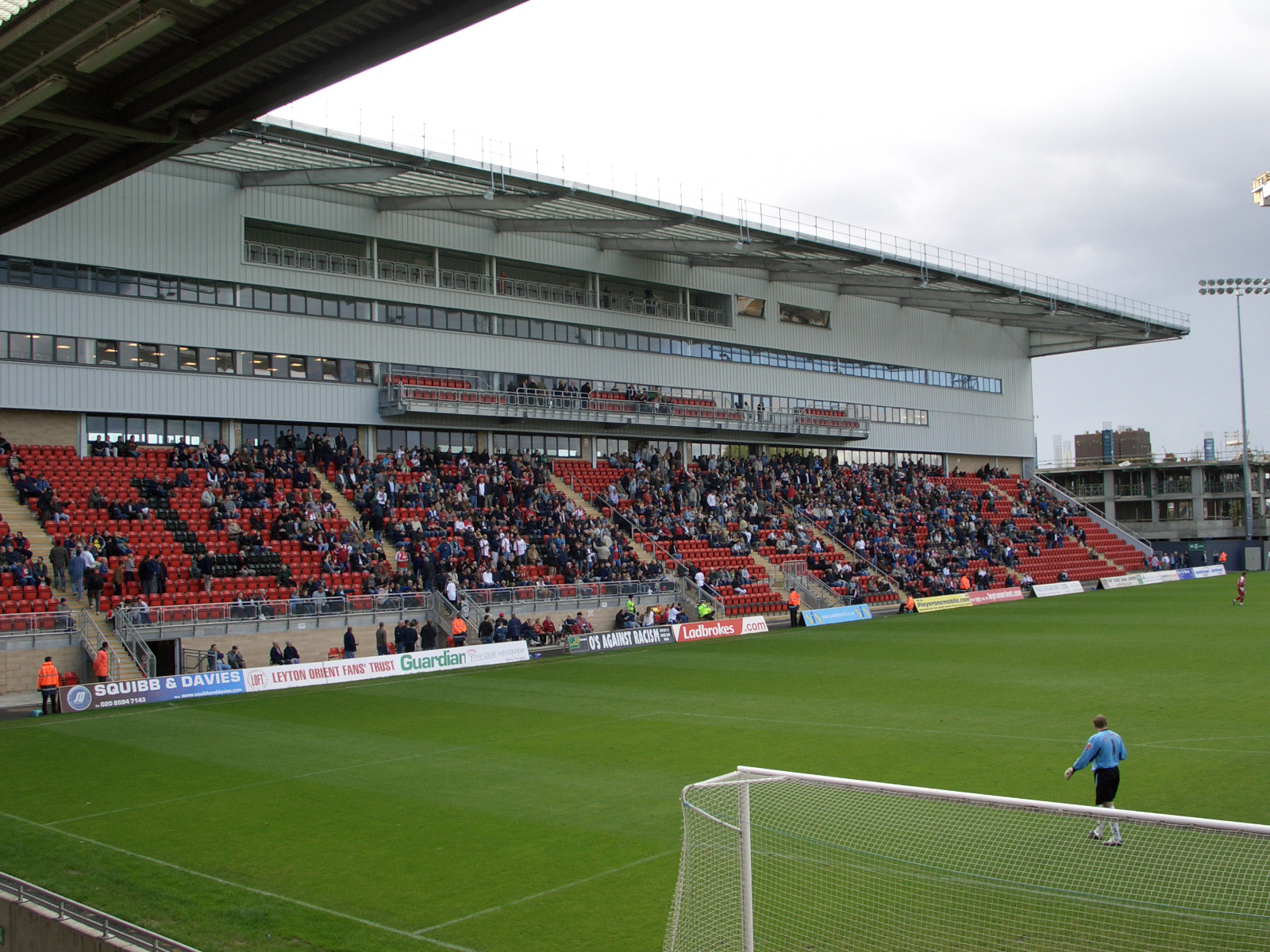
West Stand viewed from South Stand

The Justin Edinburgh Stand is the new main stand at Brisbane Road and currently seats home supporters only. It has a capacity of 2,918, with 23 disabled supporters and their helpers. The letters LOFC are spelled out in black seats. It also houses the club's administrative offices, and the club shop and main ticket office are at the back of this stand. There is also a row of executive seating (the Directors' Balcony) above the main seating which overhangs the rest of the stand, and the Olympic Suite which offers corporate hospitality. This stand also has premium seating (with its own bar) in its centre, known as the Gallery. It has two refreshment outlets at either end underneath the stand and it is accessed by turnstiles at either end via Oliver Road, or via the main reception for Gallery members and Olympic Suite diners.

The players' changing rooms are also located underneath this stand and players emerge from the tunnel here. The dugouts are located at the front of the stand, having been moved from the opposite East Stand from the start of the 2006–07 season.

The stand was officially renamed from the West Stand to the Justin Edinburgh Stand during Leyton Orient's match against Newport County on 25 January 2020, in memory of Leyton Orient's manager who led the club back to the Football League prior to his death in June 2019.

=== East Stand ===
Capacity: 3,636

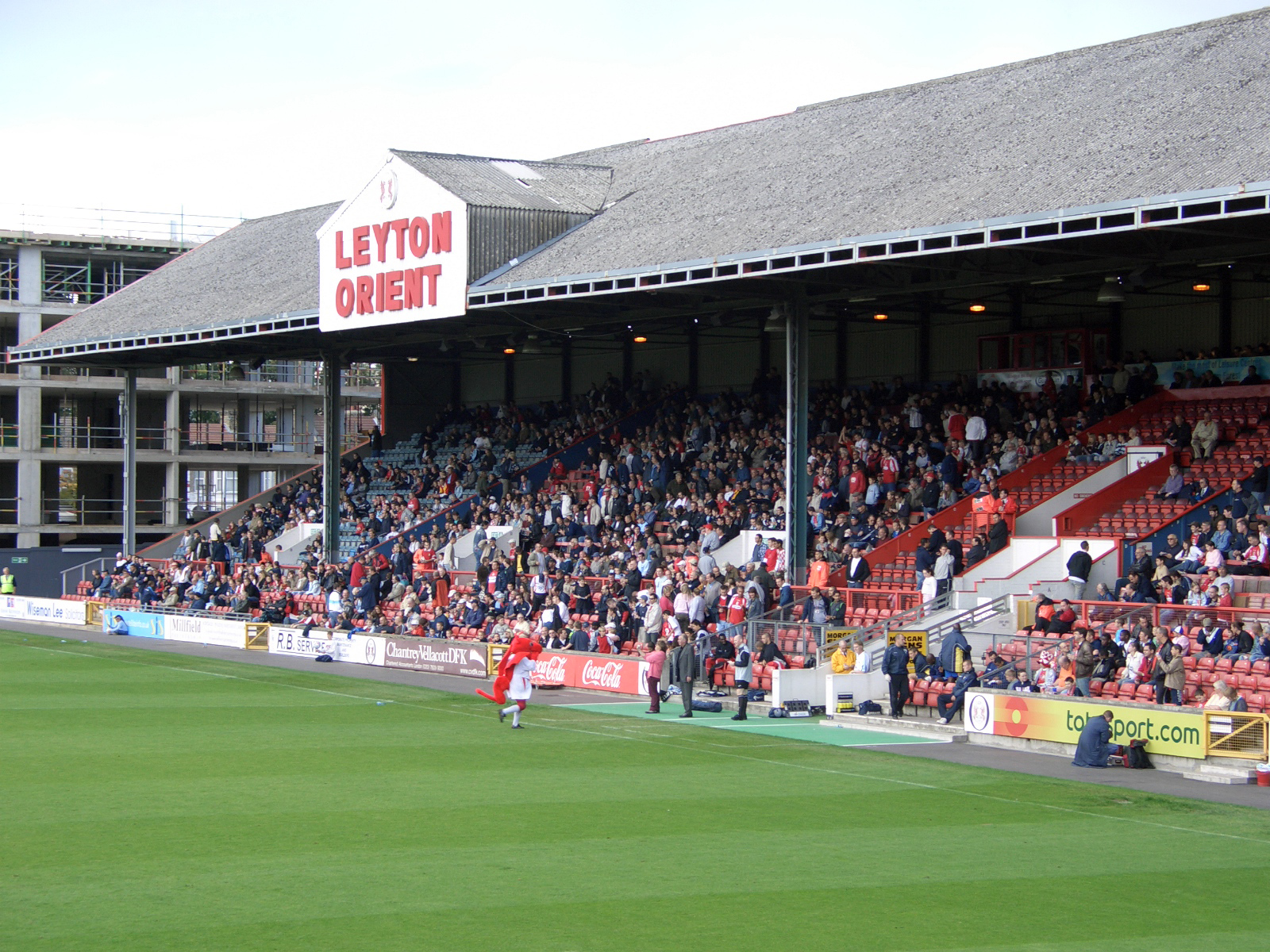
East Stand

The East Stand, previously used as the main stand, is the oldest current stand at Brisbane Road. The club bought it from Mitcham Stadium in 1955 to replace the small existing stand, which could hold 500 people. The East Stand initially provided covered seating for 2,600 spectators and was expanded to 3,500 in 1962.

The East Stand, which at the time included the club's offices and dressing rooms, then remained largely unaltered until 1999, when the narrow section of terracing at the front of the structure was made all-seater.

Today the stand is used by both home and away supporters; when an away team is allocated the entire stand for safety or other reasons, Orient fans in the north half of the stand are required to move elsewhere to accommodate the extra away fans. The capacity of the Northern end of this stand is 2,133 and the Southern end is 1,459. There are also executive seats in the middle of the stand (the old directors' box, now known as the Wyvern Suite) but these are not ordinarily used by any supporters.

- East Stand North: 2,133 with 15 disabled supporters and their helpers
- East Stand South (away): 1,459 with seven disabled supporters and their helpers

=== The Incite Consulting Community North Stand ===
Capacity: 1,381

The North Stand was completed for the start of the 2007–08 season and is currently used as a family stand. It replaces a former open terrace, has a capacity of 1,351 with provision for 15 disabled supporters and their helpers, and like the Main Stand has the letters LOFC spelled out in black seats. Access to this stand is by turnstiles at each end of the stand and there are two refreshment outlets located underneath the stand.

The stand was sponsored by the CEO of Baskin Robbins, Nigel Travis, between 2012 and 2019. Travis, a lifelong Orient fan, purchased the club itself in 2017. Since the beginning of the 2019/20 season the stand has been sponsored by Incite Consulting, a technology recruitment consultancy and executive search firm.

=== Tommy Johnston South Stand ===
Capacity: 1,336

This stand was built in 1999 and was formerly called the South Stand. It was renamed the Tommy Johnston Stand in 2008 in memory of Leyton Orient's record goalscorer Tommy Johnston, but is now known as the Tommy Johnston South Stand. It is currently for home supporters only and has a capacity of 1,336. It has a refreshment outlet and a bar underneath the stand and is accessed through turnstiles from Buckingham Road. It has the word ORIENT marked into the seats in white. A large block of flats backs on to the stand.

== Internationals ==
=== Men's football ===
12 August 2009
19:45 GMT

Ghana	4–1	Zambia
Muntari 12'; Himoonde 30' (o.g.); Agogo 43' (pen.); Draman 45'		Sunzu 32'

Brisbane Road, London
4 June 2014
18:00 GMT

Jamaica	2–2	Egypt
Dawkins 27'; Grant 38'		Elneny 5'; Morsi 72'

Brisbane Road, London
Attendance: 2,203

=== Women's football ===
2 April 2011
20:00 GMT

United States	1–2	England
Rapinoe 39'	Report	Clarke 8'; Yankey 26'

Brisbane Road, London
Attendance: 5,801
Referee: Sian Massey (England)
