= Acton and Willesden R.L.F.C. =

Acton and Willesden RLFC
Club information
- Colours: Cherry (red) and white hoops
- Founded: 1935
- Exited: 1936

Former details
- Ground(s): Acton Park Royal (30,000); Mitcham Stadium; Acton Park Royal
- CEO: Sydney Parkes
- Competition: Northern Rugby Football League
- 1935–36: 21

Uniforms
Home colours

Acton and Willesden RLFC was a professional rugby league team based at Acton Park Royal in London. Along with Streatham and Mitcham R.L.F.C., the club was an early attempt to establish rugby league in London during the 1930s.

The club was discontinued after the 1935-36 season.

== History ==
Before the Acton and Willesden and Streatham and Mitcham teams, rugby league had been played at the White City Stadium when Wigan Highfield relocated to London and played as London Highfield in 1933. Although the club drew good crowds the operating costs proved too much of a burden and it moved to Liverpool and became Liverpool Stanley RLFC.

Both Acton and Willesden RLFC and Streatham and Mitcham RLFC were started by local businessman Sydney Parkes. The idea of two teams was to generate plenty of interest in the game, and also to attempt to establish greyhound racing at both clubs' newly built grounds. Both teams were accepted into the Rugby Football League in March 1935, in time for the 1935–36 season.

A number of supporters and rejected trialists formed a number of amateur teams in London. There was no amateur competition in London at that time but leading teams were Acton Hornets, Park Royal Rangers, Hendon, Dagenham, and Harlesden All Blacks.

Unfortunately for Acton and Willesden, high player payments proved to be their downfall. Although they drew good crowds and were reasonably successful, the income was not sufficient to sustain the salaries for the 'reserve standard players' they had recruited. Sydney Parkes moved the Acton and Willesden club from Park Royal to Streatham and Mitcham's Mitcham Stadium in December 1935 to help bolster attendances, however after the supporters association protested matches were eventually returned to Park Royal. Acton and Willesden struggled on but the club folded at the conclusion of the 1935–36 season.

Streatham and Mitcham survived a season longer; however, as they were operated the same as Acton and Willesden, insufficient income became a crux and the club folded at the end of March 1937. None of the amateur clubs survived the failure of the two professional clubs. Rugby league would eventually be played again in London, although the establishment of another professional club was not until 1980 in the form of Fulham RLFC at Craven Cottage.

== Notable players ==
- Dennis Madden
- Cornelius "Con" Dennis Murphy
