= 1976 All-Ireland Junior Hurling Championship =

All Ireland Champions
- Winners: Louth (1st win)
- Captain: Peadar Fahy

All Ireland Runners-up
- Runners-up: Mayo

Provincial Champions
- Munster: Not Played
- Leinster: Not Played
- Ulster: Not Played
- Connacht: Leitrim

The 1976 All-Ireland Junior Hurling Championship was the 55th staging of the All-Ireland Junior Championship since its establishment by the Gaelic Athletic Association in 1912. Derry began the competition as defending champions, having defeated Louth in the 1975 final. Louth defeated Mayo in the 1976 final to claim the county's first All-Ireland Junior Hurling Championship title.

== Format ==
Connacht was the only province to stage a junior hurling championship in 1976, which was won by Leitrim. This was a standalone competition which had no bearing on the All-Ireland series. Instead, the winners of the respective 'A' and 'B' sections of the 1976 National Hurling League Division 3 would go forward to contest the All-Ireland final.

Louth secured a place in the final by beating Derry in the Division 3B play-off. Mayo topped Division 3A to automatically qualify for the decider.

== All-Ireland final ==
Louth led by eleven points at half-time (4-06 to 1-04) and stretched their lead to fourteen early in the second period. Despite a Mayo resurgence, they held on to win by a five-point margin.

=== Match details ===
18 July 1976	Louth	6-08 - 4-09	Mayo	Páirc Chiaráin, Athlone
	Lowry (3-2), Murphy (1-1), McEneaney, Rice (1-0 each), Mulkearns (0-3), Toal, Byrne (0-1 each)		Higgins (2-0), J. Henry, T. Henry (1-2 each), O'Keeffe (0-3), V. Henry, Murphy (0-1 each)	Referee: Gerry Kirwan (Offaly)

GK	1	Pat Hartnett (Naomh Moninne)
RCB	2	Jim McGuinness (Naomh Moninne)
FB	3	Joe Delaney (Naomh Moninne)
LCB	4	Seán Walsh (Naomh Colmcille)
RHB	5	Damien Callan (Naomh Moninne)
CHB	6	Peadar Fahy (Naomh Colmcille) (c)
LHB	7	Liam McKillion (Naomh Moninne)
MF	8	Aidan Byrne (Naomh Moninne)
MF	9	Leslie Toal (Naomh Moninne)
RHF	10	Seán McEneaney (Naomh Moninne)
CHF	11	Tom Rice (Naomh Colmcille)
LHF	12	Patsy Murphy (Naomh Moninne)
RCF	13	Tony Melia (Naomh Colmcille)
FF	14	Tadhg Lowry (Wolfe Tones)
LCF	15	Seán Mulkearns (Wolfe Tones)
Substitutes:
	16	Mick McGarry (Naomh Moninne) for Byrne
	17	Dan Hegarty (Naomh Moninne) for McKillion

GK	1	M. Nolan
RCB	2	M. Robinson
FB	3	M. Keane
LCB	4	E. Freeman
RHB	5	M. Walsh
CHB	6	D. Delaney
LHB	7	M. O'Molloy
MF	8	T. Henry
MF	9	M. Murphy
RHF	10	J. Henry
CHF	11	S. O'Keeffe
LHF	12	V. Henry
RCF	13	M. Connolly
FF	14	M. Higgins
LCF	15	M. Kenny
Substitutes:
	16	P. Clarke for Walsh
	17	J. Clarke for Delaney
