= Ulster Junior Hurling Championship =

Hurling cup competition

- Code: Hurling
- Founded: 1947; 78 years ago
- Abolished: 2004
- Region: (Republic of Ireland) Ireland (GAA)
- Trophy: Nicky Rackard Cup
- No. of teams: 9
- Last Title holders: Down (8th title)
- Most titles: Antrim (15 titles)
- Official website: Official website

The Ulster Junior Hurling Championship was an annual hurling competition organised by the Ulster council. The championship forms the third-tier of Hurling for senior county teams in the province of Ulster (the Ulster Senior Hurling Championship is the first-tier trophy). It is contested by the six county teams ranked 18–23 in the All-Ireland Senior Hurling Championship. Each year, the champions are promoted to the Ulster Intermediate Hurling Championship.

The Ulster Championship was an integral part of the wider All-Ireland Junior Hurling Championship. The winners of the Ulster final, like their counterparts in the other provinces, are rewarded by advancing to the semi-final stage of the All-Ireland series of games.

The title has been won by 9 different counties, 8 of whom have won the title more than once. The all-time record-holders are Antrim, who have won the championship on 15 occasions. Down are the title-holders, defeating Fermanagh by 1–11 to 1–09 in the 2004 final.

The competition has not been played since 2004, as all the counties now participate in either the Leinster Senior Hurling Championship, Joe McDonagh Cup, Christy Ring Cup, Nicky Rackard Cup or Lory Meagher Cup.

== Teams ==
=== List of Ulster Junior Hurling Championship counties ===
The following teams have competed in the championship for at least one season.

County	Championship titles	Last championship title	Current championship
Antrim	15	2002	Leinster Senior Hurling Championship
Armagh	6	2000	Nicky Rackard Cup
Cavan	2	1985	Lory Meagher Cup
Derry	3	1984	Christy Ring Cup
Donegal	6	2003	Nicky Rackard Cup
Down	8	2004	Joe McDonagh Cup
Fermanagh	1	1994	Lory Meagher Cup
Monaghan	6	1998	Nicky Rackard Cup
Tyrone	3	1999	Christy Ring Cup

== Roll of honour ==
County	Titles	Runners-up	Winning years	Losing years
Antrim	15	3	1950, 1951, 1952, 1953, 1954, 1955, 1957, 1958, 1959, 1961, 1963, 1966, 1968, 1969, 2002	1960, 1964, 2001
Down	8	14	1956, 1960, 1962, 1964, 1967, 1992, 1993, 2004	1948, 1949, 1952, 1954, 1955, 1957, 1958, 1961, 1965, 1966, 1973, 1999, 2000, 2003
Donegal	6	10	1947, 1948, 1972, 1989, 2001, 2003	1950, 1953, 1956, 1959, 1962, 1968, 1969, 1983, 1996, 1998
Monaghan	6	5	1971, 1986, 1987, 1988, 1997, 1998	1967, 1972, 1984, 1989, 1995
Armagh	6	4	1949, 1965, 1973, 1990, 1991, 2000	1947, 1963, 1974, 1975
Derry	3	2	1974, 1975, 1984	1985, 2002
Tyrone	3	2	1995, 1996, 1999	1951, 1993
Cavan	2	2	1983, 1985	1988, 1994
Fermanagh	1	7	1994	1986, 1987, 1990, 1991, 1992, 1997, 2004

== List of finals ==
Year	Winners		Runners-up	
Year	County	Score	County	Score
2005-	No Championship			
2004	Down	1–11	Fermanagh	0–09
2003	Donegal	5–13	Down	2–10
2002	Antrim	1–11	Derry	0–04
2001	Donegal	1–10	Antrim	1–09
2000	Armagh	1–15	Down	3–07
1999	Tyrone	1–15	Down	0–06
1998	Monaghan	3–16	Donegal	1–05
1997	Monaghan	3–12	Fermanagh	3–08
1996	Tyrone	4–15	Donegal	2–13
1995	Tyrone	5–11	Monaghan	5–09
1994	Fermanagh	4–20	Cavan	3–02
1993	Down	2–09	Tyrone	1–11
1992	Down	1–09	Fermanagh	0–08
1991	Armagh	2–07	Fermanagh	1–04
1990	Armagh	0–09, 3–07	Fermanagh	0–09, 1–10
1989	Donegal	3–12	Monaghan	0–09
1988	Monaghan	2–12	Cavan	2–08
1987	Monaghan	5–09	Fermanagh	2–10
1986	Monaghan	1–14	Fermanagh	1–10
1985	Cavan	4–07	Derry	0–05
1984	Derry	2–12	Monaghan	1–07
1983	Cavan	2–11	Donegal	1–06
1976-82	No Championship			
1975	Derry	0–04	Armagh	0–03
1974	Derry	3–05	Armagh	1–07
1973	Armagh	3–10	Down	1–06
1972	Donegal	5–03	Monaghan	5–01
1971	Monaghan *			
1970	No Championship			
1969	Antrim	5–16	Donegal	3–08
1968	Antrim	5–08	Donegal	0–03
1967	Down	6–06	Monaghan	1–05
1966	Antrim	3–13	Down	6–03
1965	Armagh	3–07	Down	4–02
1964	Down	9–07	Antrim	4–07
1963	Antrim	6–12	Armagh	2–04
1962	Down	3–07	Donegal	2–02
1961	Antrim	4–07	Down	1–03
1960	Down	5–02	Antrim	1–07
1959	Antrim	8–07	Donegal	2–02
1958	Antrim	3–04	Down	1–03
1957	Antrim	7–11	Down	3–05
1956	Down	4–06	Donegal	3–05
1955	Antrim	5–06, 4–15*	Down	4–06, 0–04
1954	Antrim	7–03	Down	1–03
1953	Antrim	2–11	Donegal	1–03
1952	Antrim	4–06	Down	0–02
1951	Antrim	7–01	Tyrone	2–01
1950	Antrim	8–08	Donegal	2–03
1949	Armagh	4–07	Down	3–03
1948	Donegal	3–03	Down	3–01
1947	Donegal	6–02	Armagh	2–03

- 1970 No record of a championship. Ulster were not represented in the All-Ireland semi-finals.
- 1971 Played on a league basis – Monaghan were the winners
- 1955 Unfinished – Refixed

== See also ==
- Ulster Senior Hurling Championship
- Ulster Intermediate Hurling Championship
- All-Ireland Junior Hurling Championship
  - Connacht Junior Hurling Championship
  - Leinster Junior Hurling Championship
  - Munster Junior Hurling Championship

== Sources ==
- Roll of Honour on gaainfo.com
- Complete Roll of Honour on Kilkenny GAA bible
