= 1938 Cork Junior Hurling Championship =

Irish hurling competition

- Champions: Brian Dillons (1st title)
- Runners-up: Cloughduv

The 1938 Cork Junior Hurling Championship was the 41st staging of the Cork Junior Hurling Championship since its establishment by the Cork County Board.

On 5 December 1938, Brian Dillons won the championship following a 5–02 to 3–03 defeat of Cloughduv in the final at Coachford Sportsfield. It remains their only championship title.
