= Tadhg Óg Murphy =

Irish hurler (born 1986)

Personal information
- Native name: Tadhg Óg Ó Murchú (Irish)
- Born: 6 January 1986 (age 40) Glanmire, County Cork, Ireland
- Occupation: Secondary school teacher

Sport
- Sport: Hurling
- Position: Right corner-forward
Club*
| Years | Club | Apps (scores) |
| 2004–2021 | Sarsfields | 77 (16–79) |
Club titles
- Cork titles: 4
College
- Years: College
- 2005–2010: University College Cork
College titles
- Fitzgibbon titles: 1
Inter-county**
| Years | County | Apps (scores) |
| 2008–2010 | Cork | 2 (0–2) |
Inter-county titles
- Munster titles: 0
- All-Irelands: 0
- NHL: 0
- All Stars: 0
- * club appearances and scores correct as of 13:59, 14 January 2024. **Inter County team apps and scores correct as of 22:06, 12 October 2014.

Tadhg Óg Murphy (born 6 January 1986) is an Irish hurling coach and former player. At club level he played with Sarsfields and at inter-county level with the Cork senior hurling team.

== Playing career ==
Murphy first played at juvenile and underage levels with the Sarsfields club. He later played as a schoolboy with Coláiste an Phiarsaigh before attending University College Cork (UCC). Murphy was part of the UCC team that beat University of Limerick to win the Fitzgibbon Cup in 2009.

After progressing from the underage grades, Murphy first played at adult club level with the Sarsfields junior team in 2004. He won an East Cork JAHC medal that year before later being promoted to the club's senior team. Murphy was part of the Sarsfields team that contested seven Cork SHC finals in eight seasons between 2008 and 2015. He claimed four winners' medals after victories in 2008, 2010, 2012 and as team captain in 2014. Murphy ended his club career with the Sarsfields intermediate team in 2021.

Murphy never played at minor or under-21 levels with Cork, but was drafted onto the Cork development team during the players' strike in 2008. He was one of the few to be retained when the regular players returned. Murphy made a number of National Hurling League and championship appearances, before being cut from the panel in 2010.

== Coaching career ==
Murphy has been involved in coaching at schools' level with Gaelcholáiste Mhuire AG in the Harty Cup. Under Denis Walsh, he was coach of the St Catherine's team that won the Munster Club JHC title in 2023, before losing the 2024 All-Ireland junior club final to Tullogher-Rosbercon.

== Personal life ==
Murphy's grandfather, Bertie, his father, Tadhg, and his uncle, Bertie Óg, all lined out with Glanmire, Sarsfields and at various levels with Cork in both hurling and Gaelic football. He trained as an account before later qualifying as a secondary school teacher.

== Honours ==
=== Player ===
University College Cork

- Fitzgibbon Cup: 2009

Sarsfields

- Cork Senior Hurling Championship (1): 2008, 2010, 2012, 2014 (c)
- East Cork Junior A Hurling Championship: 2004

=== Coach ===
St Catherine's

- Munster Junior Club Hurling Championship: 2023
