= Dennis Madden =

Wales international rugby league footballer

Personal information
- Full name: Dennis Madden
- Born: 20 March 1913 Aberavon, Wales
- Died: 1967 Baglan, Neath Port Talbot, Wales

Playing information

Rugby union
Club
Years	Team	Pld	T	G	FG	P
≤1935–35	Aberavon RFC

Rugby league
- Position: Centre
Club
Years	Team	Pld	T	G	FG	P
1935–36	Acton and Willesden
1936–≥36	Huddersfield
≤1939–≥39	Leeds
	Total	0	0	0	0	0
Representative
Years	Team	Pld	T	G	FG	P
1935–39	Wales	7

Dennis Madden (20 March 1913 – 1967) was a Welsh rugby union and professional rugby league footballer who played in the 1930s. He played club level rugby union (RU) for Aberavon RFC, and representative level rugby league (RL) for Wales, and at club level for Acton and Willesden, Huddersfield and Leeds, as a centre.

== Background ==
Dennis Madden was born in Aberavon, Wales.

== Playing career ==
=== International honours ===
Dennis Madden won 7 caps for Wales in 1935–1939 while at Acton and Willesden, Huddersfield, and Leeds.

=== County Cup Final appearances ===
Dennis Madden played at centre, and scored a try and a goal in Huddersfield's 18–10 victory over Hull F.C. in the 1938 Yorkshire Cup Final during the 1938–39 season at Odsal Stadium, Bradford on Saturday 22 October 1938.
