= 1929 All-Ireland Minor Hurling Championship =

All-Ireland Minor Hurling Championship 1929
All Ireland Champions
- Winners: Waterford (1st win)

All Ireland Runners-up
- Runners-up: Meath

Provincial Champions
- Munster: Waterford
- Leinster: Meath
- Ulster: Not Played
- Connacht: Not Played

The 1929 All-Ireland Minor Hurling Championship was the second staging of the All-Ireland Minor Hurling Championship since its establishment by the Gaelic Athletic Association in 1928.

Cork entered the championship as the defending champions, however, they were beaten by Tipperary in the Munster semi-final.

On 16 February 1930, Waterford won the championship following a 5-00 to 1-01 defeat of Meath in the All-Ireland final. This was their first All-Ireland title.

== Results ==
=== Leinster Minor Hurling Championship ===
Final

8 September 1929 Final	Meath	10-01 - 6-01	Kilkenny	Tullamore Sportsfield, Tullamore

=== Munster Minor Hurling Championship ===
Final

3 November 1929 Final	Waterford	7-05 - 1-02	Tipperary	Waterford Sportsfield, Waterford

=== All-Ireland Minor Hurling Championship ===
Final

16 February 1930 Final	Waterford	5-00 - 1-01	Meath	Croke Park, Dublin
				Referee: J Walsh (Dublin)

== Championship statistics ==
=== Miscellaneous ===
- The All-Ireland final between Meath and Waterford remains their only ever championship meeting.
