= 1931 All-Ireland Junior Hurling Championship =

All Ireland Champions
- Winners: Waterford (1st win)

All Ireland Runners-up
- Runners-up: Lancashire

Provincial Champions
- Munster: Waterford
- Leinster: Not Played
- Ulster: Not Played
- Connacht: Galway

The 1931 All-Ireland Junior Hurling Championship was the 14th staging of the All-Ireland Junior Championship since its establishment by the Gaelic Athletic Association in 1912.

Tipperary entered the championship as the defending champions, however, they were beaten by Waterford in the Munster final.

The All-Ireland final was played on 1 November 1931 at Croke Park in Dublin, between Waterford and Lancashire, in what was their first meeting in a final. Waterford won the match by 10-07 to 1-02 to claim their first ever championship title.

== Results ==
=== All-Ireland Junior Hurling Championship ===
==== All-Ireland semi-final ====
6 September 1931 Semi-final	Antrim	4-09 - 1-04	Galway	Croke Park

==== All-Ireland home final ====
11 October 1931 Home final	Waterford	6-07 - 0-03	Antrim	Croke Park

==== All-Ireland final ====
1 November 1931 Final	Waterford	10-07 - 1-02	Lancashire	Croke Park

== Championship statistics ==
=== Miscellaneous ===
- The Leinster final was declared null and void after an objection by Dublin to Kilkenny and a counter objection were both upheld.
