= 1937 All-Ireland Minor Hurling Championship =

All-Ireland Minor Hurling Championship 1937
All Ireland Champions
- Winners: Cork (2nd win)
- Captain: Mick Goggin

All Ireland Runners-up
- Runners-up: Kilkenny
- Captain: Seánie O'Brien

Provincial Champions
- Munster: Cork
- Leinster: Kilkenny
- Ulster: Antrim
- Connacht: Galway

The 1937 All-Ireland Minor Hurling Championship was the tenth staging of the All-Ireland Minor Hurling Championship since its establishment by the Gaelic Athletic Association in 1928.

Kilkenny entered the championship as the defending champions.

The All-Ireland final was played at FitzGerald Park in Killarney on 5 September 1937 between Cork and Kilkenny, in what was their second successive meeting in the final. Cork won the match by 8-05 to 2-07 to claim their second championship title overall and a first title in nine years.

== All-Ireland Minor Hurling Championship ==
=== All-Ireland semi-finals ===
8 August 1937 Semi-final	Kilkenny	5-09 - 2-02	Galway	St. Patrick's Park

29 August 1937 Semi-final	Antrim	0-02 - 6-03	Cork	McCrory Park

=== All-Ireland final ===
5 September 1937 Final	Cork	8-05 - 2-07	Kilkenny	Croke Park

== Championship statistics ==
=== Miscellaneous ===
- Cork became the third team after Tipperary and Kilkenny to win more than one All-Ireland title.
