= Tadhg Murphy (Tipperary hurler) =

Irish hurler

Personal information
- Native name: Tadhg Ó Murchú (Irish)
- Born: 1951 (age 74–75) Roscrea, County Tipperary, Ireland

Sport
- Sport: Hurling
- Position: Goalkeeper
Club
- Years: Club
- Roscrea
Club titles
- Tipperary titles: 4
- Munster titles: 2
- All-Ireland Titles: 1
Inter-county*
Years	County	Apps (scores)
1970-1973	Tipperary	2 (0-00)
Inter-county titles
- Munster titles: 0
- All-Irelands: 0
- NHL: 0
- All Stars: 0
- *Inter County team apps and scores correct as of 18:36, 30 August 2014.

Tadhg Murphy (born 1951) was an Irish retired hurler who played as a goalkeeper for the Tipperary senior team.

Born in Roscrea, County Tipperary, Murphy first arrived on the inter-county scene at the age of seventeen when he first linked up with the Tipperary minor team before later joining the under-21 side. He joined the senior panel during the 1970 championship. Murphy went on to enjoy a brief career with Tipperary.

At club level Murphy was a one-time All-Ireland medallist with Roscrea. In addition to this he also won two Munster medals and four championship medals.

Throughout his career Murphy made 2 championship appearances. His retirement came following Tipperary's defeat by Limerick in the 1973 championship.

== Honours ==
=== Player ===
Roscrea

- All-Ireland Senior Club Hurling Championship (1): 1971
- Munster Senior Club Hurling Championship (2): 1969, 1970
- Tipperary Senior Hurling Championship (4): 1969, 1970, 1972, 1973

Tipperary

- Munster Under-21 Hurling Championship (1): 1972
