= Streatham and Mitcham R.L.F.C. =

Former rugby league team

Club information
- Colours: green and white hoops
- Founded: 1935
- Exited: 1937

Former details
- Ground(s): Mitcham Stadium (30,000)
- Competition: Northern Rugby Football League
- 1936–37: 23

Streatham and Mitcham RLFC was a professional rugby league team based at Mitcham Stadium in London. They wore green and white hoops.

In the present day, top amateur rugby league side, South London Storm play close to the former Mitcham stadium and a junior Mitcham rugby league side has been founded.

== History ==
Streatham and Mitcham RLFC was founded in 1935 and enjoyed initial, but short-lived, success. Managed by sports promoter and businessman Sydney Parkes, Acton and Willesen RLFC and Streatham and Mitcham RLFC enjoyed a brief existence in London, with Streatham and Mitcham RLFC playing at the Mitcham Stadium and Acton and Willesden playing at the new Acton Park Royal stadium in an effort to draw support for rugby league in the nation's capital. Both were accepted into the Rugby Football League in March 1935.

Their first game was on 7 September 1935 against Oldham, which Oldham won 10-5. The game was watched by 22,000 which was Streatham & Mitcham's record.

A number of supporters and rejected trialists formed a number of amateur teams in London. There was no amateur competition in London at that time but leading teams were Acton Hornets, Park Royal Rangers, Hendon, Dagenham, and Harlesden All Blacks.

Acton and Willesden folded after only playing one season (1935–36) however Streatham and Mitcham survived slightly longer. Streatham and Mitcham were boosted by the signings of overseas stars such as New Zealand full-back George Nēpia. In their first season the club attracted an average crowd of over 10,000 fans.

A Sunday Express article on December 15, 1935 headlined "Blow for London club players: more support needed". In 1936, the average crowd dropped to 5,000, when a crowd of 10,000 was more required to break even.

On the day that they raised 10,162 against Rochdale Hornets, they had to cut the wages of the players, despite winning the game. On one home match day in the middle of the season the gate was £97 outgoings for players against £105 outgoings, the major problem was the wage bill. Greyhound racing had been intended to ensure the venture was viable. However, that had its own costs and was struggling in this period too. The players even entered teams in the London baseball league to try to keep the club afloat. Eventually falling crowds and rising costs forced the club to disband in February 1937. None of the London amateur clubs survived the loss of London's two professional clubs.

A Mitcham amateur club played at the stadium briefly in 1949/50, before it was permanently dismantled in 1955.

== Sources ==
- Farrer, Dave (1995). Touch and Go: A History of Professional Rugby League in London. London League Publications Ltd. ISBN 978-0-9526064-0-6.
