= 1955 All-Ireland Junior Hurling Championship =

1955 inter-county junior hurling championship

All Ireland Champions
- Winners: Cork (7th win)
- Captain: Connie Moynihan

All Ireland Runners-up
- Runners-up: Warwickshire

Provincial Champions
- Munster: Cork
- Leinster: Dublin
- Ulster: Antrim
- Connacht: Galway

The 1955 All-Ireland Junior Hurling Championship was the 34th staging of the All-Ireland Junior Championship since its establishment by the Gaelic Athletic Association in 1912.

Limerick entered the championship as the defending champions.

The All-Ireland final was played on 1 October 1955 at the Athletic Grounds in Cork, between Cork and Warwickshire, in what was their first meeting in the final. Cork won the match by 6–10 to 0–02 to claim their seventh championship title overall and a first title since 1950.

== Results ==
=== All-Ireland Junior Hurling Championship ===
==== All-Ireland semi-finals ====
28 August 1955 Semi-final	Galway	3-06 - 2-09	Dublin	Croke Park

28 August 1955 Semi-final	Antrim	3-06 - 4-09	Cork	Casement Park

11 September 1955 Semi-final replay	Galway	2-12 - 3-03	Dublin	St. Brendan's Park

==== All-Ireland home final ====
18 September 1955 Home final	Cork	3-10 - 4-05	Galway	MacDonagh Park

==== All-Ireland final ====
1 October 1955 Final	Cork	6-10 - 0-02	Warwickshire	Cork Athletic Grounds
