= Fermoy GAA =

Gaelic games club in County Cork, Ireland

- Mainistir Fhearmuí
- Founded: 1886
- County: Cork
- Colours
- Grounds: Páirc Mhic Gearailt
- Coordinates: 52°08′37.99″N 8°16′29.43″W

Playing kits
Standard colours

Senior Club Championships
	All Ireland	Munster champions	Cork champions
Football:	-	-	7

Fermoy GAA is a Gaelic Athletic Association based in the town of Fermoy, County Cork, Ireland. The club fields teams in competitions organized by the Cork GAA county board and the Avondhu GAA divisional board. The club plays both Gaelic football and hurling.

== History ==
Fermoy Gaelic Athletic Association club was founded in 1886 at a meeting in the National League Rooms (now called Fermoy Commercial club in O'Neill Crowley Quay or present home to the Fermoy Bridge club). William Troy was the club's first chairman. He was also one of the Munster delegates to the second All-Ireland Congress held in Thurles in 1887, and was elected one of the first Vice-Presidents of the GAA National Executive Body.

Clondulane village in the suburbs of Fermoy was the hub of Fermoy teams at that time, due to the large employment available at the Flour Mills which were situated there for many years.

== Achievements ==
- Cork Senior Football Championship (7): 1895, 1989, 1899, 1990, 1905, 1906, 1945
- Cork Premier Intermediate Football Championship (1): 2018 (Runners-Up 2016)
- Munster Intermediate Club Football Championship (0): (Runners-Up 2018)
- Cork Intermediate Football Championship (3): 1915, 1932, 2015
- Cork Premier Intermediate Hurling Championship (0): (Runners-Up 2016)
- Cork Intermediate Hurling Championship (1): 2014
- Munster Junior Club Hurling Championship (0): (Runners-Up 2009)
- Cork Junior Football Championship (5): 1898, 1899, 1909, 1936, 1974
- Cork Junior Hurling Championship (1): 2009
- Cork Junior B Inter-Divisional Hurling Championship (1) 2023
- Cork Minor Football Championship (2): 1923, 1953
- Cork Minor A Hurling Championship (1): 2005
- Cork Under-21 Hurling Championship (1): 1986
- North Cork Junior A Football Championship (7): 1926, 1936, 1941, 1974, 1993, 1997, 2003
- North Cork Junior A Hurling Championship (6): 1941, 1964, 1987, 1990, 1994, 1999

== Notable players ==
- Dave Magnier
- Dave Roche
- Andy Scannell
- Eoin Clancy
- Tom Bermingham
- Bobby Dineen
