= Mitcham Stadium =

It is a multipurpose sports stadium in Mitcham, London

- Interactive map of Mitcham Stadium
- Location: Mitcham, London
- Coordinates: 51°24′34″N 0°09′19″W

Construction
- Opened: 1935
- Closed: 1955

Mitcham Stadium was a multi use sports stadium in Mitcham, London. Uses included Football and rugby league, athletics. The stadium is not to be confused with the former Sandy Lane ground owned by Tooting and Mitcham FC, which was sited nearby.

== Stadium ==
The stadium was simply called the Mitcham Stadium and was in use for twenty years, from 1935 until 1955. It had covered grandstands along both straights and one of the straights was slightly extended. The stadium had a large total capacity of 60,000 (mostly standing) and was owned by Sydney Parkes, a greyhound track owner. Following its closure, the stadium was replaced by housing in 1955 and the site is now occupied by Ormerod Gardens and Fowler Road. The larger of the two stands was purchased by Bedford Town FC where it remained at their Eyrie Ground home until their landlords, The Charles Wells Eyrie Brewery decided to extend their brewing complex in the early 1980s. The West Grandstand was purchased in 1955 by Leyton Orient F.C. and the whole structure dismantled and reconstructed at their Brisbane Road ground, where it remains today.

=== Rugby League ===
It was home to the Streatham and Mitcham R.L.F.C. from 1935 to 1937.

=== Greyhound Racing ===
Some greyhound racing took place during 1936 and 1937. The track was a short lived independent (unaffiliated to a governing body). The racing ended after the owner Sydney Parker was refused a racing licence.

=== Other uses ===
The grass infield was also used for Hurling and Gaelic football matches.

Fulham F.C. were in advanced negotiations to relocate to the stadium in 1938, but the outbreak of World War II meant this never materialised.
