= Connacht Junior Hurling Championship =

- Code: Hurling
- Founded: 1925
- Abolished: 2004
- Region: Connacht (GAA)
- Last Title holders: Mayo (3rd title)
- First winner: Galway
- Most titles: Galway (23 titles)
- Official website: Official website

The Connacht Junior Hurling Championship is a junior "knockout" competition in the game of Hurling played in the province of Connacht in Ireland. The series of games are organised by the Connacht Council.

The winners of the Connacht Junior Hurling Championship each year progress to play the other provincial champions for a chance to win the All-Ireland Junior Hurling Championship. The championship was first played for in 1925.

== History ==
The championship was first played for in 1925. The province was represented by Galway in the years 1913 to 1915, 1923 to 1924 and 1927 and 1938. In the years 1983 to 1996, the province was again represented by Galway.

Since 1976, the competition has only been played once – in 2004 when Mayo beat Sligo.

Since 2005, the 4 weaker counties in the province have competed instead in the Christy Ring Cup, Nicky Rackard Cup and Lory Meagher Cup. The fifth county – Galway – have instead represented Connacht in the All-Ireland Intermediate Hurling Championship.

== Teams ==
=== Eligible teams ===
The championship is currently suspended but eight counties would be eligible for the championship:

County	Qualification	Location	Stadium	Province	Championship Titles	Last Championship Title
Galway	Junior development team	Galway	Pearse Stadium	Connacht	23	1957
Lancashire	Lory Meagher Cup team	East Didsbury	Old Bedians	Britain	0	—
Leitrim	Lory Meagher Cup team	Carrick-on-Shannon	Páirc Seán Mac Diarmada	Connacht	4	1976
London	Intermediate development team	South Ruislip	McGovern Park	Britain	0	—
Mayo	Nicky Rackard Cup team	Castlebar	MacHale Park	Connacht	3	2004
Roscommon	Nicky Rackard Cup team	Roscommon	Dr Hyde Park	Connacht	13	1974
New York	Intermediate development team	Bronx	Gaelic Park	North America	0	—
Warwickshire	Lory Meagher Cup team	Solihull	Páirc na hÉireann	Britain	0	—

== Roll of honour ==
County	Title(s)	Runners-up	Years won	Years runner-up
Galway	23	3	1925, 1926, 1929, 1930, 1931, 1933, 1934, 1935, 1937, 1938, 1939, 1940, 1946, 1947, 1948, 1949, 1950, 1951, 1953, 1954, 1955, 1956, 1957	1936, 1952, 1958
Roscommon	13	17	1952, 1958, 1959, 1960, 1961, 1962, 1963, 1964, 1965, 1966, 1971, 1972, 1974	1925, 1926, 1931, 1937, 1938, 1940, 1946, 1947, 1948, 1949, 1951, 1953, 1955, 1956, 1957, 1969, 1970
Leitrim	4	4	1969, 1970, 1975, 1976	1961, 1962, 1966, 1974
Mayo	3	10	1936, 1967, 2004	1934, 1935, 1939, 1950, 1959, 1960, 1964, 1965, 1972, 1975
Sligo	2	7	1968, 1973	1929, 1930, 1954, 1963, 1967, 1976, 2004
South and West Galway	1	0	1932	—
North and East Galway	0	1	—	1932

== List of finals ==
Year	Winner		Runners-up	
Year	County	Score	County	Score
2005–present	No championship			
2004	Mayo	1–10	Sligo	2-03
1977–2003	No championship			
1976	Leitrim	2–13	Sligo	2–01
1975	Leitrim	1–08 *	Mayo	2–05
1974	Roscommon	5–06	Leitrim	0–06
1973	Sligo			
1972	Roscommon	7–09	Mayo	0–04
1971	Roscommon			
1970	Leitrim	7–08	Roscommon	1–06
1969	Leitrim	4–05	Roscommon	1–07
1968	Sligo			
1967	Mayo	5–08	Sligo	0–08
1966	Roscommon	6–06	Leitrim	1–04
1965	Roscommon	1–06	Mayo	0–05
1964	Roscommon	1–09	Mayo	0–04
1963	Roscommon	2–14	Sligo	2–01
1962	Roscommon	7–05	Leitrim	4–01
1961	Roscommon	5–15	Leitrim	5–01
1960	Roscommon	9–18	Mayo	2–02
1959	Roscommon	3–05	Mayo	0–08
1958	Roscommon	4–06	Galway	3–05
1957	Galway	5–13	Roscommon	1–05
1956	Galway	3–09	Roscommon	3–07
1955	Galway	6–08	Roscommon	4–04
1954	Galway		Sligo	
1953	Galway	3–01 *	Roscommon	2–05
1952	Roscommon	4–05	Galway	2–03
1951	Galway	6–12	Roscommon	4–04
1950	Galway	6–06	Mayo	5–04
1949	Galway	6–08	Roscommon	1–07
1948	Galway	4–08	Roscommon	0–00
1947	Galway	4–08	Roscommon	1–09
1946	Galway	6–06	Roscommon	3–06
1942–1945	Suspended			
1941	Galway represented the province			
1940	Galway	6–05	Roscommon	1–04
1939	Galway	7–06	Mayo	1–03
1938	Galway	8–03	Roscommon	2–01
1937	Galway	5–07	Roscommon	3–02
1936	Mayo	0–14	Galway	0–13
1935	Galway	4–02	Mayo	1–02
1934	Galway	7–04	Mayo	1–02
1933	Galway	See note		
1932	West & South Galway		East & North Galway	
1931	Galway *		Roscommon	
1930	Galway	5–07	Sligo	3–02
1929	Galway	10–04	Sligo	1–01
1927–1928	Galway represented the province			
1926	Galway	7–08	Roscommon	2–03
1925	Galway	7–05	Roscommon	1–03
1923–1924	Galway represented the province			
1915–1922	No championship			
1913–1915	Galway represented the province			

=== Notes ===
- 1931 Galway defeated Roscommon by 37 points - no exact score given
- In 1933, Galway represented the province. In a special final Roscommon beat Mayo
- 1953 Galway awarded title on objection
- 1959 - 1960 Galway competed in Munster Junior Hurling Championship
- 1968 - 1973 Missing details of losing teams and scores
- 1971 - 1973 Confined to weaker counties
- 1975 Replay - Leitrim beat Mayo

== Team records and statistics ==
=== List of counties ===
The following teams have competed in the championship for at least one season.

County	Total years	First year in Championship	Most recent year in Championship	Championship titles	Last Championship title	2023 championship finish	Best championship finish	Current Championship	Lvl
Galway	30	1925	1958	23	1957	All-Ireland semi-finalists	Champions	Leinster Senior Hurling Championship	1
Leitrim	8	1961	1976	4	1976	5th (Lory Meagher Cup)	Champions	Lory Meagher Cup	5
Mayo	13	1934	2004	3	2004	6th (Christy Ring Cup)	Champions	Nicky Rackard Cup	4
North and East Galway	1	1932	1932	0	—	N / A	Runners-up	N / A	—
Roscommon	30	1925	1974	13	1974	4th (Nicky Rackard Cup)	Champions	Nicky Rackard Cup	4
Sligo	9	1929	2004	2	1973	3rd (Christy Ring Cup)	Champions	Christy Ring Cup	3
South and West Galway	1	1932	1932	1	1932	N / A	Champions	N / A	—

=== All-time table (finals only) ===
#	Team	Pld	W	D	L	Points
1	Galway	26	23	0	3	46
2	Roscommon	30	13	0	17	26
3	Leitrim	9	4	1	4	9
4	Mayo	14	3	1	10	7
5	Sligo	9	2	0	7	4

=== By decade ===
The most successful team of each decade, judged by number of titles, is as follows:

- 1920s: 3 for Galway (1925, 1926, 1929)
- 1930s: 8 for Galway (1930, 1931, 1933, 1934, 1935, 1937, 1938, 1939)
- 1940s: 5 for Galway (1940, 1946, 1947, 1948, 1949)
- 1950s: 7 for Galway (1950, 1951, 1953, 1954, 1955, 1956, 1957)
- 1960s: 7 for Roscommon (1960, 1961, 1962, 1963, 1964, 1965, 1966)
- 1970s: 3 each for Leitrim (1970, 1975, 1976) and Roscommon (1971, 1972, 1974)
- 2000s: 1 for Mayo (2004)

== See also ==
- Connacht Senior Hurling Championship
- Connacht Intermediate Hurling Championship
- All-Ireland Junior Hurling Championship
  - Leinster Junior Hurling Championship
  - Munster Junior Hurling Championship
  - Ulster Junior Hurling Championship

== Sources ==
- Complete Roll of Honour Available Here
