= Brian Dillons GAA =

Gaelic games club in County Cork, Ireland

Brian Dillons
- Na Briain Diolúnaigh
- Founded: 1910
- County: Cork
- Nickname: Dillons
- Colours
- Grounds: Páirc na Brian Diolúnaigh
- Coordinates: 51°54′33.0″N 8°26′33.50″W

Playing kits
Standard colours

Brian Dillons is one of the oldest Gaelic Athletics Association clubs in Cork city in Ireland. It is named after the Irish Fenian, Brian Dillon and its original clubhouse ("the Hole in the Wall") was less than 100 metres from Dillon's home (in the eponymous Dillons Cross). The club is now based at the Tank Field in Montenotte (approximately 1 km to the east) and has playing pitches and dressing rooms at Lisnahorna, White's Cross.

Brian Dillons is a dual club, taking part in both hurling and football competitions.

== History ==
=== Beginnings ===
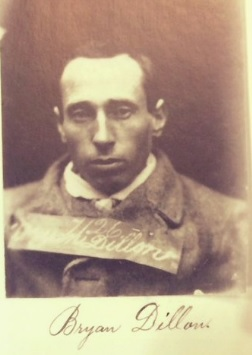
Brian Dillon

In 1910 a hurling club honouring the Irish Fenian Brian Dillon was established at Dillon's Cross. The club's original clubhouse ("the Hole in the Wall") was less than 100 metres from Dillon's home (in the eponymous Dillons Cross). The new club won the county minor hurling championship (minor was open to all ages back then) in 1915 but due to World War I the winners' medals were not presented. In 1916 Brian Dillon's lost to Lisgoold in the county junior hurling championship, the medals from the previous year had still not been presented by this stage however and because of this slight, some members of the Brian Dillons decided to form a new club at the other side of "the Glen". The breakaway club, called Glen Rovers GAA, was established late in 1916 and affiliated the following year.

=== 1930s success ===
Daniel Corkery, the politician, writer and academic (and teacher at nearby St Patrick's School) was elected the president of Brian Dillons in 1931.

In 1936, Brian Dillons club won the City Junior Football Championship and the City Junior Hurling Championship. In 1937 they retained the City Hurling Championship.

1938 was Dillon's greatest ever season, it saw them win their second City Junior Football Championship in three years, their third City Hurling Championship in a row, and their first and only County Junior Hurling Championship (defeating Cloughduv in the final on a score of 5–2 to 2–3).

=== 1960s and 1970s ===
In 1965 Dillons won the City Junior Hurling Championship and were defeated by Ballinhassig in the Cork Junior Hurling Championship final. They won the City Hurling Championship again in 1968.

Dillons won the City Football Championship in 1971 and 1978. In 1978, they were defeated in the county final by Kildorrery (3-06 to 1–08).

=== 1990s and early 2000s ===
Dillons won the City Football Championship in 1991. There was then a seven-year gap then until they won it again in 1998. That year they beat Adrigole, the Beara representatives, in the quarter-final of the County Championship (after a replay). In the semi-final of the County, Dillons were beaten (again after a replay) by Newmarket who subsequently went on to win the title.

Dillons were beaten finalists in the 2004 and 2005 City Hurling Championship. They defeated their rivals Mayfield however in the 2006 final, by a scoreline of 1–13 to 0–11. This was Dillons' sixth City Hurling title, and their first for 38 years.

=== 2010s ===
On 9 September 2012, Brian Dillons won the City Hurling Championship again, once again they defeated Mayfield in the final (1–14 to 1–10). They were defeated in that years County Final by Kildorrery (2-08 to 0–13 after a replay).

On 29 November 2013, Brian Dillons won the County Hurling League with a win over Cloughduv (0–20 to 1–10).

In 2014, Dillons won the County Hurling League again with a win over Dungourney (3–11 to 0–15).

On 6 September 2015 Brian Dillons won the City Hurling Championship again. They defeated Nemo Rangers in the final by the scoreline of 2–20 to 2–15 after extra-time. This was Brian Dillons 8th title.

On 11 September 2016 ended an 18-year famine to win the City Football Championship. Brian Dillons footballers beat their northside neighbours Delanys on a scoreline of 1–12 to 1–7 after extra time. With 5 minutes remaining in that final Dillions had been trailing by 7 points; John Horgan converted a free to up the tempo for Dillons, a last gasp goal by Brian Dillons' Darragh Brosnan took this JAFC City final to extra time. During extra time Brian Dillons pushed on to score 6 points to Delanys' 1 point. Cian McCarthy collected the 'Man of the Match' award for being outstanding all throughout the game when the match looked out of Dillons' hands. Captain Darragh Rodgers collected the cup for Dillons.

In 2017 Brian Dillons lost the City Hurling Championship Final to Nemo but qualified for the County Championship as runners-up. On 7 November of that year, Dillons lost the County Hurling Championship Final to St Catherine's GAA (0–13 to 0–12).

On 25 August 2019, Brian Dillons won the City Hurling Championship defeating Whitechurch GAA (0–21 to 0–12) in the final.

=== 2020s ===
On 25 September 2020, Brian Dillons won the City Hurling Championship defeating Passage West (2–16 to 1–17) in the final at Ballinlough.

== Achievements ==
- Cork County Junior Hurling Championship Winners (1): 1938; Runners-Up (3): 1965, 2012, 2017
- Cork City Junior Hurling Championship Winners (10): 1936, 1937, 1938, 1965, 1968, 2006, 2012, 2015, 2019, 2020
- Cork Junior Hurling League Winners (2): 2013, 2014
- McCurtain Cup Winners (3): 2012, 2014, 2019
- Cork County Junior Football Championship Runners-Up (1): 1978
- Cork City Junior Football Championship Winners (7): 1936, 1938, 1977, 1978, 1991, 1998, 2016

== Notable players ==
- Ned Porter
- David Corkery
- Donal Lenihan
- Willie Horgan – referee of 1991 All-Ireland Senior Hurling Championship Final
