= Leinster Junior Hurling Championship =

Hurling competition in Ireland

Flag of Leinster

The Leinster Junior Hurling Championship was a junior "knockout" competition in the game of Hurling played in the province of Leinster in Ireland. The competition was organized by the Leinster Council.

The winners of the Leinster Junior Hurling Championship each year progressed to play the other provincial champions for a chance to win the All-Ireland Junior Hurling Championship.

Generally, the strong hurling counties fielded their second team in this competition. The competition was suspended in 2005, with counties participating in the Joe McDonagh Cup, Christy Ring Cup, Nicky Rackard Cup, or Lory Meagher Cup instead.

== Teams ==
=== 2004 championship ===
The championship was suspended after the completion of the 2004 Leinster Junior Hurling Championship. Five counties competed in the championship.

County	2004 position	Championship titles	Last championship title
Kildare	Semi-finalists	5	1966
Kilkenny	Quarter-finalists	25	1996
Longford	Runners-up	0	—
Louth	Semi-finalists	3	1973
Meath	Champions	10	2004

=== Eligible teams ===
The championship is currently suspended but 12 counties would be eligible for the championship

County	Qualification	Location	Stadium	Province	Championship titles	Last championship title
Carlow	Intermediate development team	Carlow	Dr Cullen Park	Leinster	2	1960
Dublin	Junior development team	Donnycarney	Parnell Park	Leinster	8	1955
Kildare	Intermediate development team	Newbridge	St Conleth's Park	Leinster	5	1966
Kilkenny	Junior development team	Kilkenny	Nowlan Park	Leinster	25	1996
Laois	Intermediate development team	Portlaoise	O'Moore Park	Leinster	3	1933
Longford	Lory Meagher Cup team	Longford	Pearse Park	Leinster	0	—
Louth	Nicky Rackard Cup team	Drogheda	Drogheda Park	Leinster	3	1973
Meath	Intermediate development team	Navan	Páirc Tailteann	Leinster	10	2004
Offaly	Intermediate development team	Tullamore	O'Connor Park	Leinster	7	1953
Westmeath	Intermediate development team	Mullingar	Cusack Park	Leinster	3	1963
Wexford	Junior development team	Wexford	Chadwicks Wexford Park	Leinster	7	1992
Wicklow	Intermediate development team	Aughrim	Aughrim County Ground	Leinster	5	1971

== Qualification for subsequent competitions ==
At the end of the championship, the winning team progressed to the All-Ireland Junior Hurling Championship.

== Roll of honour ==
County	Title(s)	Runners-up	Years won	Years runner-up
Kilkenny	25	9	1909, 1911, 1913, 1916, 1928, 1930, 1935, 1939, 1941, 1946, 1949, 1951, 1956, 1958, 1983, 1984, 1986, 1988, 1989, 1990, 1991, 1993, 1994, 1995, 1996	1922, 1925, 1933, 1934, 1938, 1948, 1950, 1953, 1955
Meath	10	8	1927, 1948, 1961, 1970, 1972, 1998, 1999, 2002, 2003, 2004	1906, 1907, 1910, 1915, 1947, 1958, 1967, 1973
Dublin	8	14	1908, 1925, 1932, 1937, 1947, 1950, 1952, 1955	1909, 1911, 1924, 1927, 1929, 1935, 1939, 1940, 1946, 1949, 1951, 1957, 1985, 1987
Wexford	7	11	1926, 1940, 1957, 1959, 1985, 1987, 1992	1913, 1941, 1960, 1983, 1984, 1990, 1991, 1993, 1994, 1995, 1996
Offaly	7	4	1915, 1922, 1923, 1924, 1929, 1938, 1953	1908, 1912, 1937, 1959
Kildare	5	9	1905, 1906, 1934, 1962, 1966	1914, 1932, 1964, 1965, 1968, 1969, 1971, 1972, 2002
Wicklow	5	6	1954, 1964, 1965, 1967, 1971	1952, 1961, 1962, 1963, 1966, 1970
Laois	3	7	1910, 1914, 1933	1923, 1926, 1928, 1930, 1936, 1956, 1992
Westmeath	3	5	1912, 1936, 1963	1905, 1916, 1954, 1986, 1989
Louth	3	0	1968, 1969, 1973	—
Carlow	2	1	1907, 1960	1988
Longford	0	2	—	2003, 2004

== List of finals ==
Year	Winners		Runners-up	
Year	County	Score	County	Score
2005—	No Championship			
2004	Meath	4–14	Longford	2–07
2003	Meath	0–11	Longford	0–09
2002	Meath	2–10	Kildare	1–07
1997–2001	No Championship			
1996	Kilkenny	1–13	Wexford	1–06
1995	Kilkenny	2–14	Wexford	4–05
1994	Kilkenny	2–18	Wexford	3–08
1993	Kilkenny	1–15	Wexford	0–10
1992	Wexford	2–11	Laois	1–12
1991	Kilkenny	3–12	Wexford	2–06
1990	Kilkenny	1–09, 3–10 (R)	Wexford	0–12, 1–10 (R)
1989	Kilkenny	5–12	Westmeath	0–09
1988	Kilkenny	4–06	Carlow	3–03
1987	Wexford	6–15	Dublin	0–09
1986	Kilkenny	2–18	Westmeath	0–06
1985	Wexford	4–14	Dublin	2–06
1984	Kilkenny	2–13	Wexford	0–07
1983	Kilkenny	3–13	Wexford	1–07
1974–1982	No Championship			
1973	Louth	8–07	Meath	6–05
1972	Meath	6–09	Kildare	4–11
1971	Wicklow	3–12	Kildare	0–07
1970	Meath	6–13	Wicklow	5–09
1969	Louth	5–08	Kildare	2–05
1968	Louth	4–12	Kildare	5–08
1967	Wicklow	4–13	Meath	0–08
1966	Kildare	4–10	Wicklow	4–06
1965	Wicklow	3–14, 4–05 (R)	Kildare	5–08, 2–08 (R)
1964	Wicklow	4–08	Kildare	2–06
1963	Westmeath	4–10	Wicklow	4–07
1962	Kildare	4–10	Wicklow	2–08
1961	Meath	1–11	Wicklow	3–03
1960	Carlow	6–08	Wexford	3–08
1959	Wexford	6–10	Offaly	0–01
1958	Kilkenny	2–10	Meath	1–05
1957	Wexford	3–11	Dublin	3–04
1956	Kilkenny	6–11	Laois	1–08
1955	Dublin	4–12	Kilkenny	4–09
1954	Wicklow	4–15	Westmeath	1–03
1953	Offaly	3–07	Kilkenny	2–02
1952	Dublin	4–05	Wicklow	2–07
1951	Kilkenny	2–11	Dublin	2–06
1950	Dublin	3–07	Kilkenny	3–03
1949	Kilkenny	4–03	Dublin	3–02
1948	Meath	2–10	Kilkenny	3–05
1947	Dublin	5–05	Meath	1–05
1946	Kilkenny	4–05	Dublin	1–01
1942–1945	No Championship			
1941	Kilkenny	6–03	Wexford	2–02
1940	Wexford	4–06	Dublin	2–07
1939	Kilkenny	6–09	Dublin	4–03
1938	Offaly	3–08	Kilkenny	1–08
1937	Dublin	11–08	Offaly	5–04
1936	Westmeath	4–08	Laois	5–02
1935	Kilkenny	5–05	Dublin	1–05
1934	Kildare	3–07, 1–08 (R)	Kilkenny	3–07, 1–07 (R)
1933	Laois	3–08	Kilkenny	4–02
1932	Dublin	6–02	Kildare	4–05
1931	Declared null and void *			
1930	Kilkenny	7–03	Laois	2–02
1929	Offaly	7–03	Dublin	1–05
1928	Kilkenny	3–02	Laois	0–02
1927	Meath	3–04, 4–06 (R)	Dublin	3–04, 2–02 (R)
1926	Wexford	4–01	Laois	3–01
1925	Dublin	4–04, 4–04 (R)	Kilkenny	4–04, 4–02 (R)
1924	Offaly	7–04	Dublin	5–05
1923	Offaly	4–01	Laois	3–02
1922	Offaly	4–03	Kilkenny	3–03
1917–1921	No Championship			
1916	Kilkenny	12–02	Westmeath	1–01
1915	Offaly	6–02	Meath	3–05
1914	Laois	16–04	Kildare	0–00
1913	Kilkenny	7–03	Wexford	3–03
1912	Westmeath	4–03	Offaly	2–01
1911	Kilkenny	5–01, 3–02 (R)	Dublin	5–01, 1–03 (R)
1910	Laois	12–02	Meath	2–01
1909	Kilkenny	4–07	Dublin	3–03
1908	Dublin	1–07 *	Offaly	1–03
1907	Carlow	2–09	Meath	0–09
1906	Kildare	2–06	Meath	1–08
1905	Kildare	3–08	Westmeath	3–05

- 1931 Kilkenny 2–09 Dublin 1–05 After objection and counter objection, declared null and void
- 1908 Unfinished. Dublin awarded the title.

== Team records and statistics ==
=== List of counties ===
County	Most recent year in championship	Championship titles	Last championship title
Carlow	—	2	1960
Dublin	—	8	1955
Kildare	2004	5	1966
Kilkenny	2004	25	1996
Laois	—	3	1933
Longford	2004	0	—
Louth	2004	3	1973
Meath	2004	10	2004
Offaly	—	7	1953
Westmeath	—	3	1963
Wexford	—	7	1992
Wicklow	—	5	1971

== See also ==
- Leinster Senior Hurling Championship
- Leinster Intermediate Hurling Championship
- All-Ireland Junior Hurling Championship
  - Munster Junior Hurling Championship
  - Connacht Junior Hurling Championship
  - Ulster Junior Hurling Championship

== External sources ==
- Leinster Junior Hurling Roll of Honour
- Leinster List of final results 1905–1999
