= Munster Junior Hurling Championship =

Hurling competition in Ireland

The Munster Junior Hurling Championship is a junior "knockout" competition in the game of Hurling played in the province of Munster in Ireland. The series of games is organised by the Munster Council.

The winners of the Munster Junior Hurling Championship each year progress to play the other provincial champions for a chance to win the All-Ireland Junior Hurling Championship.

Generally, the stronger hurling counties have fielded their second teams in this competition. In recent years though, they have participated in the Munster Intermediate Hurling Championship instead. The competition has been suspended and is unlikely to be re-established. Between 1961 and 1973 Kerry represented Munster in the All-Ireland Junior Hurling Championship. From 1974 to 1982 there was no Munster team nominated.

== Teams ==
=== Eligible teams ===
The championship is currently suspended but six counties would be eligible for the championship:

County	Qualification	Location	Stadium	Province	Championship Titles	Last Championship Title
Clare	Junior development team	Ennis	Cusack Park	Munster	4	1995
Cork	Junior development team	Cork	Páirc Uí Chaoimh	Munster	21	1996
Kerry	Intermediate development team	Tralee	Austin Stack Park	Munster	1	1956
Limerick	Junior development team	Limerick	Gaelic Grounds	Munster	10	1986
Tipperary	Junior development team	Thurles	Semple Stadium	Munster	16	1991
Waterford	Junior development team	Waterford	Walsh Park	Munster	3	1936

== Roll of honour ==
County	Title(s)	Runners-up	Years won	Years runner-up
Cork	21	16	1912, 1916, 1923, 1925, 1929, 1932, 1937, 1938, 1940, 1947, 1950, 1955, 1958, 1959, 1960, 1983, 1984, 1987, 1992, 1994, 1996	1913, 1914, 1926, 1933, 1934, 1936, 1946, 1948, 1949, 1952, 1953, 1957, 1986, 1989, 1990, 1991
Tipperary	16	11	1910, 1911, 1913, 1915, 1924, 1926, 1928, 1930, 1933, 1951, 1953, 1985, 1988, 1989, 1990, 1991	1912, 1916, 1923, 1931, 1940, 1950, 1954, 1983, 1984, 1987, 1996
Limerick	10	5	1927, 1935, 1939, 1941, 1946, 1948, 1952, 1954, 1957, 1986	1911, 1924, 1937, 1951, 1985
Clare	4	11	1914, 1949, 1993, 1995	1910, 1915, 1925, 1927, 1930, 1932, 1938, 1955, 1988, 1992, 1994
Waterford	3	10	1931, 1934, 1936	1928, 1929, 1935, 1939, 1941, 1947, 1956, 1958, 1993, 1995
Kerry	1	2	1956	1959, 1960

== List of finals ==
Year	Winners		Runners-up	
Year	County	Score	County	Score
1997–present	No Championship			
1996	Cork	2–15	Tipperary	2–10
1995	Clare	4–11	Waterford	1–09
1994	Cork	1–10	Clare	1–09
1993	Clare	2–15	Waterford	0–10
1992	Cork	1–12	Clare	1–10
1991	Tipperary	4–13, 2–20 (R)	Cork	5–10, 0–11 (R)
1990	Tipperary	0–18	Cork	2–06
1989	Tipperary	2–14	Cork	2–08
1988	Tipperary	5–09	Clare	0–15
1987	Cork	2–16	Tipperary	1–09
1986	Limerick		Cork	
1985	Tipperary	3–06	Limerick	1–10
1984	Cork	0–14	Tipperary	0–10
1983	Cork	4–19	Tipperary	3–08
1961–1982	No Championship			
1960	Cork	4–05	Kerry	3–04
1959	Cork	3–09	Kerry	4–03
1958	Cork	6–09	Waterford	3–05
1957	Limerick	2–10	Cork	1–10
1956	Kerry	6–07	Waterford	0–03
1955	Cork	5–10	Clare	4–04
1954	Limerick	5–04	Tipperary	1–07
1953	Tipperary	4–08, 4–07 (R)	Cork	5–05, 4–06 (R)
1952	Limerick	6–06	Cork	2–06
1951	Tipperary	4–08	Limerick	3–02
1950	Cork	3–07	Tipperary	3–06
1949	Clare	3–03	Cork	0–06
1948	Limerick	4–07	Cork	4–05
1947	Cork	11–08	Waterford	1–03
1946	Limerick	6–06	Cork	5–06
1942–1945	No Championship			
1941	Limerick	4–08	Waterford	0–04
1940	Cork	5–03	Tipperary	3–03
1939	Limerick	2–04 *	Waterford	4–02
1938	Cork	2–03, 7–05 (R)	Clare	1–06, 4–00 (R)
1937	Cork	5–05	Limerick	3–01
1936	Waterford	3–01	Cork	1–01
1935	Limerick	6–08	Waterford	2–00
1934	Waterford	7–10	Cork	5–02
1933	Tipperary	4–02	Cork	1–02
1932	Cork	1–04	Clare	1–02
1931	Waterford	7–03	Tipperary	4–05
1930	Tipperary	7–04	Clare	1–02
1929	Cork	3–03	Waterford	2–04
1928	Tipperary	4–03	Waterford	0–03
1927	Limerick	4–04	Clare	2–02
1926	Tipperary	3–07	Cork	2–03
1925	Cork	6–03	Clare	4–02
1924	Tipperary	4–03	Limerick	2–02
1923	Cork	8–04	Tipperary	5–01
1917–1922	No Championship			
1916	Cork	6–00	Tipperary	4–01
1915	Tipperary	9–01	Clare	2–01
1914	Clare	6–02	Cork	5–02
1913	Tipperary	3–03	Cork	1–06
1912	Cork	4–05	Tipperary	3–01
1911	Tipperary	6–04	Limerick	2–02
1910	Tipperary	5–00, 5–01 *	Clare	2–00, 1–00

- 1939 Limerick awarded title on an objection
- 1910 Final unfinished. Replay ordered.

== See also ==
- Munster Senior Hurling Championship
- Munster Intermediate Hurling Championship
- All-Ireland Junior Hurling Championship
  - Connacht Junior Hurling Championship
  - Leinster Junior Hurling Championship
  - Ulster Junior Hurling Championship

== Sources ==
- Roll of Honour on www.gaainfo.com
- Complete list of winning teams on Munster GAA website
