= 1912 All-Ireland Junior Hurling Championship =

All Ireland Champions
- Winners: Cork (1st win)
- Captain: Joe Hallinan

All Ireland Runners-up
- Runners-up: Westmeath

Provincial Champions
- Munster: Cork
- Leinster: Westmeath
- Ulster: Not Played
- Connacht: Not Played

The 1912 All-Ireland Junior Hurling Championship was the first staging of the All-Ireland Junior Championship, the Gaelic Athletic Association's second tier hurling championship. The championship ended on 23 February 1913.

The All-Ireland final was played on 23 February 1913 at Jones's Road in Dublin, between Cork and Westmeath, in what was their first ever championship meeting. Cork won the match by 3–06 to 2–01 to claim their first championship title.

== Results ==
=== Leinster Junior Hurling Championship ===
==== Leinster quarter-finals ====
16 June 1912 Quarter-final	Offaly	6-06 - 1-01	Dublin	Maryborough Sportsfield

11 August 1912 Quarter-final	Kilkenny	2-02 - 1-01	Wexford	Jones's Road

==== Leinster semi-finals ====
14 July 1912 Semi-final	Westmeath	7-05 - 1-03	Meath	Jones's Road

15 September 1912 Semi-final	Offaly	5-06 - 2-01	Kilkenny	Maryborough Sportsfield

==== Leinster final ====
6 October 1912 Final	Westmeath	4-03 - 2-01	Offaly	Jones's Road

=== Munster Junior Hurling Championship ===
==== Munster first round ====
23 June 1912 First round	Kerry	1-01 - 4-03	Cork	Tralee Sportsfield

30 June 1912 First round	Waterford	0-02 - 6-04	Limerick	Waterford Sportsfield

==== Munster semi-finals ====
21 July 1912 Semi-final	Tipperary	4-05 - 1-03	Clare	Tipperary Sportsfield

15 September 1912 Semi-final	Cork	4-05 - 1-03	Limerick	Fermoy Sportsfield

==== Munster final ====
10 November 1912 Final	Cork	4-05 - 3-01	Tipperary	Waterford Sportsfield

=== All-Ireland Junior Hurling Championship ===
==== All-Ireland final ====
23 February 1913 Final	Cork	3-06 - 2-01	Westmeath	Jones's Road

== Championship statistics ==
=== Miscellaneous ===
- Cork and Westmeath won their respective provincial championships for the first time in their history.
