= All-Ireland Junior Hurling Championship =

Irish junior sporting competition

- Irish: Craobh Iomána Shóisear na hÉireann
- Code: Hurling
- Founded: 1912
- Abolished: 2004
- Region: Ireland (GAA)
- No. of teams: 5 (final tournament)
- Last Title holders: Meath (6th title)
- First winner: Cork
- Most titles: Cork (11 titles)

The All-Ireland Junior Hurling Championship was a hurling competition organized by the Gaelic Athletic Association in Ireland. The competition was originally contested by the second teams of the strong counties, and the first teams of the weaker counties. In the years from 1961 to 1973 and from 1997 until now, the strong counties have competed for the All-Ireland Intermediate Hurling Championship instead. The competition was then restricted to the weaker counties. The competition was discontinued after 2004 as these counties now compete for the Nicky Rackard Cup instead.

From 1974 to 1982, the original format of the competition was abandoned, and the competition was incorporated in Division 3 of the National Hurling League. The original format, including the strong hurling counties was re-introduced in 1983.

== History ==
=== Summary of winners ===
#	County	Titles	Runners-up	Total
1	Cork	11	4	15
2	Kilkenny	9	6	15
2	Tipperary	9	4	13
4	Meath	6	3	9
5	London	5	20	25
6	Limerick	4	1	5
7	Warwickshire	3	6	9
7	Mayo	3	2	5
7	Dublin	3	1	4
7	Armagh	3	0	3
7	Roscommon	3	0	3
12	Galway	2	7	9
12	Louth	2	3	5
12	Kerry	2	2	4
12	Derry	2	2	4
12	Clare	2	2	4
12	Offaly	2	1	3
12	Waterford	2	1	3
12	Wexford	2	1	3
12	Kildare	2	0	2
12	Wicklow	2	0	2
22	Monaghan	1	3	4
22	Antrim	1	2	3
22	Westmeath	1	1	2
22	Down	1	1	2
26	Hertfordshire	0	2	2
26	Donegal	0	2	2
26	Laois	0	1	1
26	Britain	0	1	1
26	Lancashire	0	1	1
26	Carlow	0	1	1
26	Fermanagh	0	1	1
26	Tyrone	0	1	1

=== Participating teams ===
The competition was originally contested by the second teams of the strong counties, and the first teams of the weaker counties. In the years from 1961 to 1973 and from 1997 until now, the strong counties have competed for the All-Ireland Intermediate Hurling Championship instead. The competition was then restricted to the weaker counties. The competition was discontinued after 2004 as these counties now compete for the Nicky Rackard Cup instead.

== Format ==
The All-Ireland Junior Hurling Championship features five teams in the final tournament. Up to 32 county teams contest the four provincial junior championships with the four respective champions qualifying for the All-Ireland series. The British county teams compete in their own championship and the winners join the other four provincial winners in the final tournament.

=== Overview ===
The Championship is a single elimination tournament. Each team is afforded only one defeat before being eliminated from the championship. Pairings for matches are drawn at random and there is currently no seeding. Each match is played as a single leg. If a match is drawn there is a period of extra time, however, if both sides are still level at the end of extra time a replay takes place and so on until a winner is found.

=== Format ===
Provincial championships: The provincial championships are played on a straight knockout basis.

Quarter-finals: The British champions and one of the provincial winners teams contest this round. The winners advance to the semi-finals.

Semi-finals: The quarter-final winner and the other provincial winners contest this round. The two winners from these two games advance to the final.

Final: The two semi-final winners contest the final. The winning team are declared champions.

=== Promotion ===
At the end of the championship, the winning team is automatically promoted to the All-Ireland Intermediate Hurling Championship for the following season.

== Qualification ==
The All-Ireland Junior Hurling Championship features five teams in the final tournament. Up to 32 county teams contest the four provincial junior championships with the four respective champions qualifying for the All-Ireland series. The British county teams compete in their own championship and the winners join the other four provincial winners in the final tournament.

Province	Championship	Qualifying Team
Connacht	Connacht Junior Hurling Championship	Champions
Leinster	Leinster Junior Hurling Championship	Champions
Munster	Munster Junior Hurling Championship	Champions
Ulster	Ulster Junior Hurling Championship	Champions
Britain	British Junior Hurling Championship	Champions

== Teams ==
=== 2004 Teams ===
The following teams competed in the 2004 All-Ireland Junior Hurling Championship:

County	Location	Stadium	Province	First year in championship	In championship since	Provincial championship	Provincial titles	Last provincial title	Championship titles	Last championship title
Down						Ulster Junior Hurling Championship		1993		1964
Fermanagh						Ulster Junior Hurling Championship		1994		—
Kildare						Leinster Junior Hurling Championship		1966		1966
Kilkenny						Leinster Junior Hurling Championship		1996		1995
London						British Junior Hurling Championship		—		1963
Longford						Leinster Junior Hurling Championship		—		—
Louth	Drogheda	Drogheda Park				Leinster Junior Hurling Championship		1973		1977
Mayo	Castlebar	McHale Park				Connacht Junior Hurling Championship		1967		2003
Meath						Leinster Junior Hurling Championship		2003		1999
Sligo						Connacht Junior Hurling Championship		1973		—

== List of finals ==
Year	Winner		Runners-up	
Year	County	Score	County	Score
2005–	No championship			
2004	Meath	2–09	Down	1–06
2003	Mayo	1–08	Donegal	0–09
2002	Antrim	2–07	Meath	1–06
2001	Roscommon	1–18	Donegal	2–03
2000	Armagh	1–11	Meath	1–04
1999	Meath	2–11	Tyrone	0–09
1998	Meath	1–14	Monaghan	1–09
1997	Monaghan	3–11	Meath	0–11
1996	Galway	1–14	Kilkenny	2–09
1995	Kilkenny	1–20	Clare	1–06
1994	Cork	2–13	Kilkenny	2–11
1993	Clare	3–10	Kilkenny	0–08
1992	Wexford	2–07, 0–13 (R)	Cork	0–13 1–08 (R)
1991	Tipperary	4–17	London	1–05
1990	Kilkenny	4–21	Tipperary	2–11
1989	Tipperary	0–12	Galway	0–08
1988	Kilkenny	1–12	Tipperary	0–10
1987	Cork	3–11	Wexford	2–13
1986	Kilkenny	1–17	Limerick	0–15
1985	Wexford	3–09	Tipperary	1–13
1984	Kilkenny	0–13	Galway	2–05
1983	Cork	3–14	Galway	2–15
1982	Derry	1–10	Monaghan	0–06
1981	Mayo	2–13	Louth	1–08
1980	Mayo	2–13	Monaghan	0–07
1979	Armagh	2–13	Derry	2–01
1978	Armagh	5–15	Mayo	2–06
1977	Louth	1–14	Fermanagh	2–04
1976	Louth	6–08	Mayo	4–09
1975	Derry	5–12	Louth	3–05
1974	Roscommon	2–11	Derry	2–09
1973	Warwickshire	6–09	Louth	3–08
1972	Kerry	5–05	Warwickshire	2–09
1971	Wicklow	4–09, 3–09, 4–06 * (2R)	Hertfordshire	3–11 2–12 3–08 (R)
1970	Meath	1–15, 3–14 (R)	Hertfordshire	4–06, 3–07 (R)
1969	Warwickshire	3–06	Kerry	0–11
1968	Warwickshire	1–14	Kerry	1–09
1967	Wicklow	3–15	London	4–04
1966	Kildare	4–06	Warwickshire	2–09
1965	Roscommon	3–09	Warwickshire	2–11
1964	Down	3–02	London	1–03
1963	London	4–07	Antrim	3–06
1962	Kildare	4–07	London	2–04
1961	Kerry	4–14	London	2–05
1960	London	2–04, 4–08 (R)	Carlow	2–04, 2–11 (R)
1959	London	5–10	Antrim	2–10
1958	Cork	7–10	Warwickshire	4–02
1957	Limerick	5–12	London	2–05
1956	Kilkenny	5–02	London	2–08
1955	Cork	6–10	Warwickshire	0–05
1954	Limerick	4–06	London	2–04
1953	Tipperary	4–10	Warwickshire	3–03
1952	Dublin	3–07	London	2–07
1951	Kilkenny	3–09	London	3–05
1950	Cork	5–05	London	2–04
1949	London	3–07	Clare	3–06
1948	Meath	3–05, 2–07 (R)	London	3–05, 2–05 (R)
1947	Cork	3–10	London	2–03
1946	Kilkenny	5–04	London	2–02
1945	No championship			
1944	No championship			
1943	No championship			
1942	No championship			
1941	Limerick	8–02	Galway	4–01
1940	Cork	3–03	Galway	3–01
1939	Galway	2–06	London	2–02
1938	London	4–04	Cork	4–01
1937	Dublin	7–08	London	3–06
1936	Westmeath	2–05	Waterford	3–01
1935	Limerick	4–09	London	3–03
1934	Waterford	3–05	London	3–03
1933	Tipperary	10–01	London	1–04
1932	Dublin	8–04	London	2–00
1931	Waterford	10–07	Lancashire	1–02
1930	Tipperary	8–06	Kilkenny	3–02
1929	Offaly	6–01	Cork	2–03
1928	Kilkenny	4–06	Tipperary	4–04
1927	Meath	2–03	Britain	1–01
1926	Tipperary	6–02	Galway	2–03
1925	Cork	5–06	Dublin	1–00
1924	Tipperary	5–05	Galway	1–02
1923	Offaly	3–04	Cork	3–02
1922	No championship			
1921	No championship			
1920	No championship			
1919	No championship			
1918	No championship			
1917	No championship			
1916	Cork	4–06	Kilkenny	3–04
1915	Tipperary	1–06	Offaly	2–02
1914	Clare	6–05	Laois	1–01
1913	Tipperary	2–02	Kilkenny	0–00
1912	Cork	4–06	Westmeath	2–01

- First game disputed – replay ordered

== Roll of honour ==
=== By county ===
County	Titles	Runners-up	Years won	Years runners-up
Cork	11	4	1912, 1916, 1925, 1940, 1947, 1950, 1955, 1958, 1983, 1987, 1994	1923, 1929, 1938, 1992
Kilkenny	9	6	1928, 1946, 1951, 1956, 1984, 1986, 1988, 1990, 1995	1913, 1916, 1930, 1993, 1994, 1996
Tipperary	9	4	1913, 1915, 1924, 1926, 1930, 1933, 1953, 1989, 1991	1928, 1985, 1988, 1990
Meath	6	3	1927, 1948, 1970, 1998, 1999, 2004	1997, 2000, 2002
London	5	20	1938, 1949, 1959, 1960, 1963	1932, 1933, 1934, 1935 1937, 1939, 1946, 1947, 1948, 1950, 1951, 1952, 1954, 1956, 1957, 1961, 1962, 1964, 1967, 1991
Limerick	4	1	1935, 1941, 1954, 1957	1986
Warwickshire	3	6	1968, 1969, 1973	1953, 1955, 1958, 1965, 1966, 1972
Mayo	3	2	1980, 1981, 2003	1976, 1978
Dublin	3	1	1932, 1937, 1952	1925
Armagh	3	0	1978, 1979, 2000	—
Roscommon	3	0	1965, 1974, 2001	—
Galway	2	7	1939, 1996	1924, 1926, 1940, 1941, 1983, 1984, 1989
Louth	2	3	1976, 1977	1973, 1975, 1981
Kerry	2	2	1961, 1972	1968, 1969
Derry	2	2	1975, 1982	1974, 1979
Clare	2	2	1914, 1993	1949, 1995
Offaly	2	1	1923, 1929	1915
Waterford	2	1	1931, 1934	1936
Wexford	2	1	1985, 1992	1987
Kildare	2	0	1962, 1966	—
Wicklow	2	0	1967, 1971	—
Monaghan	1	3	1997	1980, 1982, 1998
Antrim	1	2	2002	1959, 1963
Westmeath	1	1	1936	1912
Down	1	1	1964	2004
Hertfordshire	0	2	—	1970, 1971
Donegal	0	2	—	2001, 2003
Laois	0	1	—	1914
Britain	0	1	—	1927
Lancashire	0	1	—	1931
Carlow	0	1	—	1960
Fermanagh	0	1	—	1977
Tyrone	0	1	—	1999

=== By province ===
Division	Titles	Runners-up	Total
Munster	30	14	44
Leinster	29	18	47
Britain	8	30	38
Ulster	8	12	20
Connacht	8	9	17

== Team records and statistics ==
=== Provincial champions by year ===
Brackets = representative of province

Year	Britain	Connacht	Leinster	Munster	Ulster
2004	(London)	Mayo	Meath	—	Down
2003	—	(Mayo)	Meath	—	Donegal
2002	—	—	Meath	—	Antrim
2001	—	(Roscommon)	—	—	Donegal
2000	—	—	(Meath)	—	Armagh
1999	—	—	(Meath)	—	Tyrone
1998	—	—	(Meath)	—	Monaghan
1997	—	—	(Meath)	—	Monaghan
1996	—	(Galway)	Kilkenny	Cork	Tyrone
1995	—	—	Kilkenny	Clare	Tyrone
1994	—	—	Kilkenny	Cork	Fermanagh
1993	—	—	Kilkenny	Clare	Down
1992	—	—	Wexford	Cork	Down
1991	(London)	—	Kilkenny	Tipperary	Armagh
1990	—	—	Kilkenny	Tipperary	Armagh
1989	—	(Galway)	Kilkenny	Tipperary	Donegal
1988	—	—	Kilkenny	Tipperary	Monaghan
1987	—	—	Wexford	Cork	Monaghan
1986	—	—	Kilkenny	Limerick	Monaghan
1985	—	—	Wexford	Tipperary	Cavan
1984	—	(Galway)	Kilkenny	Cork	Derry
1983	—	(Galway)	Kilkenny	Cork	Cavan
1982	—	—	—	—	—
1981	—	—	—	—	—
1980	—	—	—	—	—

=== List of All-Ireland Junior Hurling Championship counties ===
The following teams have competed in the championship for at least one season.

County	Province	First year in championship	Most recent year in championship	Championship titles	Last championship title	2023 championship finish	Best JHC finish	Current championship	Lvl
Antrim	Ulster			1	2002				
Armagh	Ulster			3	2000				
Britain	Britain			0	—				
Carlow	Leinster			0	—				
Clare	Munster			2	1993				
Cork	Munster	1912		11	1994				
Derry	Ulster			2	1982				
Donegal	Ulster			0	—				
Down	Ulster			1	1964				
Dublin	Leinster			3	1952				
Fermanagh	Ulster			0	—				
Galway	Connacht			2	1996				
Hertfordshire	Britain			0	—				
Kerry	Munster			2	1972				
Kildare	Leinster			2	1966				
Kilkenny	Leinster			9	1995				
Lancashire	Britain			0	—				
Laois	Leinster			0	—				
Limerick	Munster			4	1957				
London	Britain			5	1963				
Louth	Leinster			2	1977				
Mayo	Connacht			3	2003				
Meath	Leinster			6	2004				
Monaghan	Ulster			1	1997				
Offaly	Leinster			2	1929				
Roscommon	Connacht			3	2001				
Tipperary	Munster			9	1991				
Tyrone	Ulster			0	—				
Warwickshire	Britain			3	1973				
Waterford	Munster			2	1934				
Westmeath	Leinster	1912		1	1936				
Wexford	Leinster			2	1992				
Wicklow	Leinster			2	1971				

=== Performances by province ===
#	Team	Wins	Runners-up	Last Title	Biggest Contributor	Wins
1	Munster	30	14	1994	Cork	11
2	Leinster	29	18	2004	Kilkenny	9
3	Britain	8	30	1973	London	5
3	Ulster	8	12	2002	Armagh	3
3	Connacht	8	9	2003	Mayo, Roscommon	3 each

== See also ==
- All-Ireland Senior Hurling Championship
  - Connacht Senior Hurling Championship
  - Leinster Senior Hurling Championship
  - Munster Senior Hurling Championship
  - Ulster Senior Hurling Championship
- All-Ireland Senior B Hurling Championship
- All-Ireland Intermediate Hurling Championship
  - Connacht Intermediate Hurling Championship
  - Leinster Intermediate Hurling Championship
  - Munster Intermediate Hurling Championship
  - Ulster Intermediate Hurling Championship
- All-Ireland Junior Hurling Championship
  - Connacht Junior Hurling Championship
  - Leinster Junior Hurling Championship
  - Munster Junior Hurling Championship
  - Ulster Junior Hurling Championship
