= Jack Barrett (hurler) =

Irish hurler, selector, and administrator

Personal information
- Native name: Seán Bairéid (Irish)
- Born: 1 January 1911 Kinsale, County Cork, Ireland
- Died: 16 February 1979 (aged 68) Midleton, County Cork, Ireland
- Occupation: Victualler
- Height: 5 ft 8 in (173 cm)

Sport
- Sport: Hurling
- Position: Midfield
Clubs
- Years: Club
- Kinsale; Carrigdhoun
Club titles
- Cork titles: 0
Inter-county
Years	County	Apps (scores)
1934-1941	Cork	19 (2-04)
Inter-county titles
- Munster titles: 1
- All-Irelands: 1
- NHL: 2

John Barrett (1 January 1911 – 16 February 1979) was an Irish hurler, selector and administrator. His career included All-Ireland Championship victories as a player and later as a selector with the Cork senior hurling team.

== Playing career ==
=== Kinsale ===
Barrett first played for the Kinsale club at adult level in the late 1920s. He claimed his first major silverware with the club in 1930 when Kinsale defeated Tracton by 6-04 to 3-03 to secure the South East Junior Championship. After surrendering the title to Passage the following year, Barrett won a second divisional championship winners' medal in 1933 after a 5-04 to 1-02 victory over Rochestown. He subsequently claimed a County Junior Championship title after lining out in the 5-04 to 0-01 defeat of Skibbereen. Barrett also lined out with divisional side Carrigdhoun in the County Senior Championship.

=== Cork ===
Barrett first played for Cork when he was drafted onto the junior team during the 1932 Munster Junior Championship. He made his debut on 8 May 1932 when he lined out at left wing-back in Cork's 8-06 to 1-02 defeat of Waterford and later claimed a Munster Championship medal after being switched to right wing-forward for the 1-04 to 1-02 victory over Clare in the final.

Barrett's performances at junior level brought him to the attention of the senior selectors and he was drafted onto the team during the 1934 Munster Championship. He made his championship debut on 10 June 1934 in a 7-05 to 5-06 defeat of Tipperary.

After five years as a first team regular, Barrett claimed his first Munster Championship medal after a 4-03 to 3-04 victory over Limerick in the 1939 Munster final. On 3 September 1939, he lined out as midfield partner to team captain Jack Lynch when Cork suffered a 2-07 to 3-03 defeat by Kilkenny in the "thunder and Lightning" All-Ireland final.

Barrett collected his first national silverware when Cork defeated Tipperary by 8-09 to 6-04 to win the 1939-40 National League title. He was selected at left wing-back when Cork surrendered their provincial title to Limerick in the 1940 Munster final.

After winning a second successive National League medal after a 4-11 to 2-07 victory over Dublin in the 1941 league final, Barrett lined out in the second All-Ireland final of his career on 28 September 1941 when he again partnered Jack Lynch at midfield against Dublin. He ended the game with an All-Ireland medal after the 5-11 to 0-06 victory. Barrett ended the season by lining out in Cork's 5-04 to 2-05 defeat by Tipperary in the delayed Munster final. He brought the curtain down on his inter-county career following this defeat.

=== Munster ===
Barrett had yet to make his championship debut for the Cork senior team when he was selected for the Munster inter-provincial team in advance of the 1934 Railway Cup final. He won his first Railway Cup medal as a non-playing substitute after Munster's 6-03 to 3-02 defeat of Leinster.

After defeats in 1935 and 1936, Barrett claimed his second winners' medal as a non-playing substitute after a 1-09 to 3-01 victory over Leinster in the 1937 Railway Cup final. It was the first of four successive Railway Cup titles for Barrett, with the subsequent victories all coming on the field of play.

== Coaching career ==
Barrett was added to the selection committee of the Cork senior hurling team in advance of the 1952 Munster Championship. The campaign was a successful one with Cork claiming the title after a 1-11 to 2-06 defeat of Tipperary. Cork subsequently claimed their first All-Ireland Championship in six years after a 2-14 to 0-07 defeat of Dublin in the final. Barrett was retained as a member of the selection committee for the following two seasons, with Cork securing three successive All-Ireland victories after defeats of Galway in 1953 and Wexford in 1954.

== Administrative roles ==
In retirement from playing Barrett became involved in the administrative affairs of the Gaelic Athletic Association. In 1954 he became vice-chairman of the Cork County Board. He served in that capacity for five years until 1959. That year Barrett was elected chairman of the Munster Council. He served in that post until 1962. Four years later Barrett was back as chairman of the Cork County Board. He served in that capacity until 1971, however, he returned for a second stint from 1973 until 1974.

== Death ==
On 16 February 1979, Barrett died suddenly age 68 while inspecting cattle at a farm just outside Midleton. He was survived by his wife Breda, four daughters and two sons. After the news of his death, leading figures from the world of hurling paid tribute to him. GAA president Con Murphy described him as "a tremendously sporting and determined player, full of ability strength and courage."

== Honours ==
=== Player ===
Kinsale

- Cork Junior Hurling Championship (1): 1933
- South East Junior A Hurling Championship (2): 1930, 1933

Cork

- All-Ireland Senior Hurling Championship (1): 1941
- Munster Senior Hurling Championship (1): 1939
- National Hurling League (2): 1939-40, 1940-41
- Munster Junior Hurling Championship (1): 1932

Munster

- Railway Cup (5): 1934, 1937, 1938, 1939, 1940

=== Selector ===
Cork

- All-Ireland Senior Hurling Championship (3): 1952, 1953, 1954
- Munster Senior Hurling Championship (3): 1952, 1953, 1954
- National Hurling League (1): 1952-53

Sporting positions
Preceded by Con Murphy	Vice-Chairman of the Cork County Board; 1954-1959	Succeeded by Ned Cotter
Preceded by P. A. Murphy	Chairman of the Cork County Board; 1966-1971	Succeeded by Derry Gowen
Preceded by Derry Gowen	Chairman of the Cork County Board; 1973-1974	Succeeded by Donal O'Sullivan
