= South-East Under 21A Football Championship =

Gaelic sports competition

South East Under 21 A Football Championship
- Founded: 1966; 60 years ago
- Title holders: Kinsale (12th title)
- Most titles: Valley Rovers (21 titles)

The South East Cork Under-21 A Football Championship is an annual Gaelic football competition organised by the Carrigdhoun Board of the Gaelic Athletic Association since 1966 for Under-21 Gaelic football teams in the southeastern region of County Cork, Ireland.

The title has been won at least once by 8 different clubs. The all-time record-holders are Valley Rovers, who have won a total of 21 titles.

Carrigaline are the title-holders after defeating Valley Rovers by 2-15 to 1-16 in the 2026 championship final.

== Teams ==
=== U21A Football ===
Team	Location	Colours	Championship Titles	Last Championship Title
Carrigaline	Carrigaline	Blue and yellow	18	2026
Valley Rovers	Innishannon	Green and white	21	2024
Kinsale	Kinsale	Blue and white	12	2025

=== U21B Football ===
Team	Location	Colours	Championship Titles	Last Championship Title
Ballymartle	Riverstick	Green and gold	4	2023
Ballinhassig	Ballinhassig	Blue and white	3	2024
Courcey Rovers	Ballinspittle	Red and white	2	2019
Diarmuid O'Murchus (Shamrocks/Crosshaven)	Shanbally/Crosshaven	Green and Black	0	

=== U21C Football ===
Team	Location	Colours	Championship Titles	Last Championship Title
Tracton	Tracton	Green and red	0	
Ballygarvan	Ballygarvan	Red and white	0	

== Roll of honour ==
#	Team	Wins	Years won	Years runners-Up
1	Valley Rovers	21	1976, 1981, 1984, 1985, 1986, 1987, 1990, 1991, 1993, 1994, 1995, 1996, 2002, 2005, 2006, 2007, 2013, 2014, 2015, 2016, 2024	1978, 1983, 1989, 2000, 2012, 2017, 2018, 2019, 2022, 2023, 2026
2	Carrigaline	18	1966, 1972, 1979, 1988, 1989, 1992, 1997, 1998, 2003, 2008, 2011, 2012, 2017, 2018, 2019, 2022, 2023, 2026	1982, 1984, 1994, 1995, 2004, 2005, 2006, 2015, 2016, 2024, 2025
3	Kinsale	12	1970, 1971, 1973, 1974, 1977, 1978, 1982, 1983, 1999, 2000, 2010, 2025	2001, 2011
4	Shamrocks	4	1967, 1968, 1980, 2004	1970, 1976, 1977, 1981, 1982, 1985, 1986, 1987
5	Ballymartle	1	2009	2013
5	Courcey Rovers	1	2001	1988, 1996, 2010
5	Crosshaven	1	1975	1966, 1974, 1990, 1992, 1993
5	Tracton	1	1969	1967, 1972, 2008
6	Robert Emmets	0		1979, 1980
6	Ballinhassig	0		2009, 2014
6	Ballygarvan	0		1990, 2002, 2007

== List of finals ==
Year	Winner	Score	Runners-up	Score
2026	Carrigaline	2-15	Valley Rovers	1-16
2025	Kinsale	2-17	Carrigaline	1-12
2024	Valley Rovers	3-11	Carrigaline	1-11
2023	Carrigaline	3-09	Valley Rovers	1-09
2022	Carrigaline	2-12	Valley Rovers	2-06
2019	Carrigaline	3-16	Valley Rovers	1-06
2018	Carrigaline	2-10	Valley Rovers	0-09
2017	Carrigaline	2-12	Valley Rovers	1-13
2016	Valley Rovers	1-15	Carrigaline	1-09
2015	Valley Rovers	1-11	Carrigaline	2-06
2014	Valley Rovers	1-11	Ballinhassig	1-07
2013	Valley Rovers	2-12	Ballymartle	1-07
2012	Carrigaline	1-13	Valley Rovers	1-04
2011	Carrigaline	2-15	Kinsale	0-10
2010	Kinsale	4-11	Courcey Rovers	0-04
2009	Ballymartle	1-10	Ballinhassig	1-05
2008	Carrigaline	4-10	Tracton	0-04
2007	Valley Rovers	0-12	Ballygarvan	1-08
2006	Valley Rovers	0-12	Carrigaline	1-06
2005	Valley Rovers	6-09	Carrigaline	1-07
2004	Shamrocks	2-12	Carrigaline	2-09
2003	Carrigaline	1-10	Valley Rovers	1-05
2002	Valley Rovers		Ballygarvan	
2001	Courcey Rovers	2-10	Kinsale	3-06
2000	Kinsale		Valley Rovers	
1999	Kinsale	0-13	Carrigaline	1-09
1998	Carrigaline		Valley Rovers	
1997	Carrigaline		Kinsale	
1996	Valley Rovers	1-08	Courcey Rovers	2-02
1995	Valley Rovers		Carrigaline	
1994	Valley Rovers		Carrigaline	
1993	Valley Rovers	1-09	Crosshaven	0-04
1992	Carrigaline		Crosshaven	
1991	Valley Rovers		Carrigaline	
1990	Valley Rovers		Crosshaven	
1989	Carrigaline		Valley Rovers	
1988	Carrigaline	4-06	Courcey Rovers	0-04
1987	Valley Rovers	5-06	Shamrocks	1-06
1986	Valley Rovers		Shamrocks	
1985	Valley Rovers		Shamrocks	
1984	Valley Rovers		Carrigaline	
1983	Kinsale		Valley Rovers	
1982	Kinsale		Shamrocks	
1981	Valley Rovers	0-09	Shamrocks	0-02
1980	Shamrocks	0-09	Robert Emmets	1-04
1979	Carrigaline	2-05	Robert Emmets	0-03
1978	Kinsale		Valley Rovers	
1977	Kinsale		Shamrocks	
1976	Valley Rovers		Shamrocks	
1975	Crosshaven	2-06	Valley Rovers	2-04
1974	Kinsale		Crosshaven	
1973	Kinsale		Carrigaline	
1972	Carrigaline		Tracton	
1971	Kinsale			
1970	Kinsale		Shamrocks	
1969	Tracton	2-05	Kinsale	0-03
1968	Shamrocks			
1967	Shamrocks		Tracton	
1966	Carrigaline	3-07	Crosshaven	2-05

=== By decade ===
The most successful team of each decade, judged by number of South-East Under 21A Football Championship titles, is as follows:

- 1960's: 2 for Shamrocks (1967-68)
- 1970's: 6 for Kinsale (1970-71-73-74-77-78)
- 1980's: 5 for Valley Rovers (1981-84-85-86-87)
- 1990's: 6 for Valley Rovers (1990-91-93-94-95-96)
- 2000's: 4 for Valley Rovers (20002-05-06-07)
- 2010's: 5 for Carrigaline (2011-12-17-18-19)

=== Gaps ===
Top five longest gaps between successive championship titles:

- 24 years: Shamrocks (1980-2004)
- 16 years: Kinsale (1983-1999)
- 15 years: Kinsale (2010-2025)
- 12 years: Shamrocks (1968-1980)
- 10 years: Kinsale (2000-2010)

== See also ==
- Cork Under-21 Football Championship
