= Richie Browne =

Irish hurler (1934–2024)

Personal information
- Native name: Risteard de Brún (Irish)
- Born: 1934 Castletownroche, County Cork, Ireland
- Died: 14 July 2024 (aged 89) Castletownroche, County Cork, Ireland
- Height: 5 ft 8 in (173 cm)

Sport
- Sport: Hurling
- Position: Left corner-forward
Clubs
Years	Club	Apps (scores)
1952-1982 1955-1969	Castletownroche → Avondhu	26 (28-33)
Club titles
- Cork titles: 1
Inter-county
Years	County	Apps (scores)
1961-1964	Cork	7 (7-03)
Inter-county titles
- Munster titles: 0
- All-Irelands: 0
- NHL: 0

Richard Browne (1934 – 14 July 2024) was an Irish hurler. At club level he played with Castletownroche, divisional side Avondhu and was also a member of the Cork senior hurling team.

== Career ==
Browne first played hurling at under-14 level with Castletownroche. He never played at minor level but eventually progressed onto the club's junior team in 1952. Browne played in goal for a while before winning the first of seven North Cork JHC titles in 1954. He claimed a Cork JHC medal in 1960 before winning a Cork IHC medal in 1964. Browne's performances earned selection to the Avondhu divisional team in 1958. He completed the full set of county honours by winning a Cork SHC medal after a defeat of University College Cork in the 1966 final. Browne had a 30-year career at adult level with Castletown and he retired after winning a second Cork JHC title in 1982.

Browne first played with the Cork senior hurling team in a tournament game in the mid-1950s. He later lined out with the junior team and won a Munster JHC medal in 1959. A spell with the intermediate team resulted in Browne being called up to the senior team alongside his brother Johnny Browne for the unsuccessful 1961 Munster SHC campaign. His last game for Cork was a defeat by Tipperary in the 1964 Munster final.

== Death ==
Browne died on 14 July 2024, at the age of 89.

== Honours ==
Castletownroche

- Cork Intermediate Hurling Championship: 1964
- Cork Junior Hurling Championship: 1960, 1982
- North Cork Junior A Hurling Championship: 1954, 1956, 1957, 1960, 1978, 1979, 1982

Avondhu

- Cork Senior Hurling Championship: 1966

Cork

- Munster Junior Hurling Championship: 1959
