= Justin McCarthy (hurler) =

Irish hurler & manager (born 1945)

Personal information
- Native name: Justin Mac Carthaigh (Irish)
- Born: 1945 (age 80–81) Rochestown, County Cork, Ireland
- Occupations: Boilermaker, sales manager
- Height: 6 ft 0 in (183 cm)

Sport
- Sport: Hurling
- Position: Midfield
Clubs
Years	Club	Apps (scores)
1962–1963 1963 1964–1980 1975–1980 1981–1982 1982 1987–1991	Rochestown → Carrigdhoun; Passage → Seandún; Shamrocks → Carrigdhoun; Passage	1 (0–02); 15 (10–43); 12 (1–14) 2 (0–00)
Club titles
- Cork titles: 0
Inter-county*
Years	County	Apps (scores)
1964–1974	Cork	24 (3–20)
Inter-county titles
- Munster titles: 3
- All-Irelands: 1
- NHL: 2
- All Stars: 0
- *Inter County team apps and scores correct as of 18:38, 18 April 2015.

Justin J. McCarthy (born 1945) is an Irish former hurler and manager. At club level he lined out with multiple club and divisional sides, while he was also a member of the Cork senior hurling team.

McCarthy enjoyed a 30-year club career, during which time he lined out with Rochestown, Passage and Shamrocks, as well as divisional sides Carrigdhoun and Seandún. As an inter-county midfielder, McCarthy won two National League titles and three Munster SHC medals, with the highlight of his career was an All-Ireland SHC victory as Hurler of the Year in 1966.

As a coach, McCarthy has been involved at club and inter-county levels over a 50-year period. He enjoyed All-Ireland IHC success with Antrim and consecutive National League victories with Clare, before coaching Cork to the All-Ireland title in centenary year in 1984. McCarthy's tenure with Waterford yielded Munster SHC and National League titles, while he ended his inter-county coaching career as Limerick manager.

== Early life ==
McCarthy first played as a schoolboy in various competitions at the Capuchin College in Rochestown. When Bord na nÓg was formed in Cork in the 1950s, he took part in the under-14, under-15 and under-16 competitions. McCarthy first played for a Cork team in 1955 when it was arranged for a Cork altar boys selection to take on their Kilkenny counterparts in a challenge game.

== Club career ==
McCarthy's club career spanned nearly 30 years and multiple club sides and divisional teams. He first played at adult level as a 17-year-old with the Rochestown junior team, while also earning selection to the Carrigdhoun divisional team. McCarthy transferred to the Passage club in 1964. When the club regraded to the Cork IHC, he was called into the Seandún divisional team. McCarthy later spent a spell as player-manager with the Shamrocks club, winning a South East JHC medal in 1981. He later returned to the Passage club and continued playing until 1991 when he retired after winning a city divisional junior league title.

== Inter-county career ==
McCarthy first appeared on the inter-county scene when he was selected for the Cork minor hurling team during the unsuccessful 1963 Munster MHC campaign. He immediately progressed to the Cork under-21 and intermediate teams in 1964. McCarthy made such an impression on the latter team that he earned an immediate call-up to the senior team and made his debut in a defeat of Galway in the opening round of the 1964 Munster SHC.

McCarthy quickly became a regular member of the team throughout the following two seasons. He ended the 1966 season with an All-Ireland medal and the honour of being the then youngest ever Hurler of the Year after lining out at midfield in the defeat of Kilkenny in the 1966 All-Ireland final. McCarthy was one of a number of players from the senior team who also won an All-Ireland U21HC medal after a defeat of Wexford that season.

Cork endured two unsuccessful years after winning the All-Ireland title; however, McCarthy remained a key part of the team. He added to his medal collection with a National Hurling League title after a defeat of Wexford in the 1969 final. After winning his second Munster SHC medal following a first defeat of Tipperary in 12 years, McCarthy's preparations for the 1969 All-Ireland final came to a halt when, on the week of the game, he was involved in a motorbike accident on his way to training and broke his leg in three places. In the short-term, this meant that he had to watch the defeat by Kilkenny from a wheelchair on the sideline. In the long-term, McCarthy's injury meant that he also missed out on Cork's 1970 season, a year which saw the team capture further National League, Munster and All-Ireland honours.

McCarthy made his return to the Cork team during their successful 1971–72 National League campaign. He later claimed a third Munster SHC winners' medal after a defeat of Clare n the final. For the third time in four years, Cork were presented with the possibility of making a clean sweep of all the available hurling titles, however, McCarthy's side suffered a 3–24 to 5–11 defeat by Kilkenny in the 1972 All-Ireland final, having led by eight points at one stage in the second half.

McCarthy won a third National League title after a 6–15 to 1–12 win over Limerick in the 1974 NHL final. His inter-county career ended shortly after this with a defeat by Waterford in the opening round of the 1974 Munster SHC.

== Inter-provincial career ==
McCarthy also lined out with Munster in the inter-provincial hurling competition, the Railway Cup. He first played with his province in 1967, however, Munster were defeated on that occasion by their great rivals Leinster. McCarthy was picked on the Munster team again in 1968. That year Munster overcame Leinster in the final to capture the title. McCarthy won a second consecutive Railway Cup medal in 1969 as Munster trounced Connacht by 3–13 to 4–4. This was his last outing with the province.

== Early coaching career ==
Justin McCarthy
Sport
Club management
- Years: Club
- 1990–1995: Cashel King Cormac's
	1	1	0
Inter-county management
- Years: Team
- 1969–1970 1974–1975 1976–1980 1983–1985 2001–2008 2008–2010: Antrim; Cork; Clare; Cork; Waterford; Limerick
Inter-county titles as manager
County	League	Province	All-Ireland
Antrim Cork Clare Waterford	1; 1; 0; 0	1; 3; 0; 3	1; 3; 0; 3

=== Antrim ===
Over the last four decades McCarthy has been hugely interested in managing and coaching various teams at various levels all over the country. He first became involved in coaching in 1969 when he was recuperating following his motorcycle accident. During his time out from the playing McCarthy travelled to the opposite end of the country where he was invited to give coaching lessons to the Antrim hurlers. He was hugely successful in this capacity as Antrim claimed the All-Ireland title at intermediate level in 1970 following a convincing win over Warwickshire.

=== Cork (1975–1976) ===
Not long after his retirement from playing McCarthy became fully involved in the management side of hurling. In 1975 he was appointed trainer of the Cork senior hurling team for the first time. In this regard he guided his native county to a Munster final victory over Limerick, the first of five provincial wins in-a-row. Cork were subsequently defeated by Galway in the All-Ireland semi-final by just two points. Following this defeat McCarthy resigned as trainer.

=== Clare (1977–1980) ===
Just before the start of 1977 McCarthy was approached by then manager Fr. Harry Bohan to become his co-manager of the Clare senior hurlers. McCarthy accepted the offer, a decision which came as a surprise to people in Cork. His first season in charge was a successful one from the beginning. Clare had had a good National League campaign and qualified for the final in 1977. Kilkenny, the reigning champions and victors over Clare in the final of 1976, provided the opposition on this occasion and an interesting game ensued. Clare's ability to get goals at crucial times proved vital and they claimed the 2–8 to 0–9 victory. With this victory under their belt Clare were widely tipped for success in the provincial championship. The team did reach the Munster final that year where McCarthy's native county of Cork provided the opposition. Clare got off to a really bad start when they conceded a penalty after seventy-five seconds which was duly converted by Tim Crowley. Instead of crumbling Clare battled back and really put Cork to the pin of their collar. At half-time they trailed by only one point, however, they were reduced to fourteen men after Jim Power was sent off. The second half was another interesting tussle, however, Cork won by 4–15 to 4–10.

In 1978 Clare stormed through the National League again and qualified for the final for the third year in-a-row. Once again Kilkenny provided the opposition and, once again, an interesting game ensued. Clare's ability to get goals once proved the defining feature of a close game as McCarthy's side went on to win by 3–10 to 1–10. This victory buoyed up Clare for the provincial championship where they qualified for a second consecutive Munster showdown with Cork. Over 54,000 spectators turned up at Semple Stadium that day to see Clare attempt to dethrone Cork. At half-time it looked as if Clare were about to triumph as they trailed by 0–5 to 0–3 after Cork recorded thirteen wides. With ten minutes left Cork led by five points, however, a late rally gave Clare some hope. At the full-time whistle Cork still had a narrow 0–13 to 0–11 win.

This victory proved to be Clare's last chance of a championship breakthrough. McCarthy remained with the Clare hurlers until their exit from the championship in June 1980.

=== Cork (1984–1985) ===
In 1984, McCarthy was back as joint-coach of the Cork senior hurling team with the Rev. Michael O'Brien. It was the second time that he was coach of his native county. That year McCarthy helped guide Cork to their third Munster title in succession. The provincial final win over Tipperary was truly remarkable given the fact that Cork were trailing by four points with four minutes to go and ended up winning the game by four points. Cork beat Antrim in the semi final stage to advance to the centenary year All-Ireland final. Offaly provided the opposition on that occasion in a special championship decider at Semple Stadium in Thurles. It was their first meeting in the history of the championship, however, Cork were the favourites. A 3–16 to 1–12 victory gave McCarthy's Cork a reasonably easy but a special victory nonetheless.

In 1985 both McCarthy and O'Brien guided Cork to another Munster final appearance. Once again provincial rivals Tipperary stood in their way. The coaches had prepared their team well and a 4–17 to 4–11 victory was the result. The subsequent All-Ireland semi-final saw Cork take on Galway. McCarthy's side were the favourites going into the game, however, Galway had other ideas. A 4–12 to 5–5 defeat showed that the Cork team were far off the championship pace. This defeat was McCarthy's last championship in charge of the side and a new management team was installed at the end of the year.

=== Cashel King Cormac's ===
Another challenge beckoned in 1990 when McCarthy took charge of the Tipperary side Cashel King Cormac's. It had been fifty years since the side had reached the final of the Tipperary County Championship, however, in his first year in charge McCarthy steered them towards the final which they lost by one point. The following year they won the county championship before claiming the Munster club title. McCarthy's side almost reached the All-Ireland club final, however, they were beaten by eventual winners Kiltormer of County Galway at the semi-final stage after playing two replays to decide the winner. McCarthy remained with Cashel until 1995.

== Managing Waterford ==
McCarthy was appointed manager of the Waterford senior hurling team on 30 July 2001. He wasn't the only candidate nominated for the position and was initially appointed for a two-year term. He succeeded his former team-mate Gerald McCarthy as manager and beat off several former Waterford greats for the post.

McCarthy's very first championship game in charge posed quite a challenge. Waterford were drawn to play McCarthy's native county of Cork in the Munster semi-final. It was a tough assignment for the new manager, however, Waterford came through it to win by a single point. With his first victory behind him McCarthy's team subsequently lined out against reigning Munster and All-Ireland champions Tipperary in the provincial final. The game was in the balance for much of the seventy minutes with both sides being level six times in all. The last quarter saw Waterford assert themselves and they went on to win the game on a score line of 2–23 to 3–12. It was Waterford's first Munster title since 1963 and McCarthy was lauded as a hero. Waterford's next game was an All-Ireland semi-final meeting with Clare. Clare were defeated in the first-round of the provincial championship, however, they reached the penultimate stage of the All-Ireland series via the qualifiers. Waterford were expected to win, however, victory went to the men from the West.

In 2003 McCarthy's side set out to retain their provincial title. Once again the team swept through Munster and reached the provincial final where Cork provided the opposition. At half-time Waterford looked on course to capture a second consecutive Munster title, however, Cork fought back in the second half to snatch a 3–16 to 3–12 victory. McCarthy's team were down but not out, however, their next outing in the All-Ireland qualifiers system against Wexford ended in defeat.

In 2004 McCarthy's side marched to a third consecutive Munster final appearance following defeat in the National League final. Once again Cork provided the opposition and Waterford were out to avenge the previous year's defeat. McCarthy's side got off to the worst possible start when Cork scored a soft goal after just three minutes. The Deise settled down quickly after that and got right back into the game. The result was still in the balance up until the final second, however, McCarthy's men won on a score line of 3–16 to 1–21. The game itself is considered one of the greatest of all-time. Waterford's next outing was an All-Ireland semi-final meeting with Kilkenny. "The Cats" were not as spectacular as they had been in previous seasons, however, McCarthy's side were defeated by 3–12 to 0–18.

In 2005 Waterford faced Cork in the Munster championship for the fourth season in-a-row. Once again McCarthy's team conceded an early goal, however, the result was much tighter at the end. Cork won the day on a score line of 2–17 to 2–15 and confined Waterford to the qualifiers. McCarthy's side came through the qualifiers system successfully, however, the random draw for the All-Ireland quarter-finals meant that Waterford had to play Cork for a second time. The game was less exciting than previous meetings with Cork winning by five points.

In 2006 McCarthy's side fell to Tipperary in the Munster semi-final. The qualifiers proved a happy hunting ground for Waterford as they won every one of their games in the round robin and topped the group. The men from the Deise later gained revenge on Tipp in the All-Ireland quarter-final before lining out against Cork in the All-Ireland semi-final. Once again the game proved to be an exciting and close affair, with neither side gaining any huge lead. Cork led with just seconds remaining in the game when Donal Óg Cusack, Cork's goalkeeper, saved a '65' from going over the bar. The sliothar was subsequently cleared, and Cork won the game by just a single point. After the game McCarthy came in for some criticism, however, the players insisted that he was the men to lead them again for another season.

The players' faith in McCarthy was rewarded early in 2007 when he led them to a National League title. The victory over Kilkenny was all the sweeter as it was Waterford's first league success since 1963. The subsequent Munster championship saw Waterford take on Cork once again. Cork were severely depleted due to the suspension of some of their key players, however, the game turned out to be another classic between the greatest hurling rivals of the decade. The score line of 5–15 to 3–18 tells its own story with McCarthy's men capturing the victory. The Munster final saw the Decies paired against Limerick. It was the teams' first meeting in the provincial decider since 1958. Justin's men showed their class in the final quarter and won by eight points. Waterford captured their third Munster titles in six years under McCarthy. McCarthy's men later faced Cork for the second time, however, the game ended in a draw after a controversial free. Waterford won the replay setting up a second meeting with Limerick. Waterford has to play a third high-profile game in two weeks, and this showed on the day when Limerick caught them on the hop and won a place in the All Ireland final. Most people believed that Waterford were unfairly treated by the system and they should have got at least two weeks to prepare for the semi-final after playing two tough games against Cork. McCarthy's men had failed at the All-Ireland semi-final stage. Once again there was some criticism of the manager, however, the players indicated that they wished McCarthy to stay on for another year. Dan Shanahan and John Mullane spoke out and publicly said that he was the only man they wanted for the job and Once again their request was granted.

In 2008, Waterford were expected to retain their Munster title and challenge for the All-Ireland once again. After a National League campaign and a nine-point loss to Clare in the first round of the championship a players meeting was held where it was indicated that some of the team no longer wanted McCarthy in charge. From that another meeting with the County Board was held where McCarthy resigned as manager. With a record of three Munster titles and one National League title, Justin McCarthy presided over Waterford's most successful period since the 1957-1963 era, when Waterford won an all Ireland title in 1959 and lost in two other all Ireland final appearances in 1957 and 1963 respectively.

== Managing Limerick ==
On 7 October 2008 McCarthy was named as the new manager of the Limerick senior hurling team. His side started the Munster Championship with a draw with Waterford, but were beaten in the replay. They then entered the Qualifier System and had wins over Wexford and Laois. They then were drawn against beaten Leinster finalists Dublin in Semple Stadium. Despite going into the game as underdogs Limerick came out 2–18 to 1–17 winners. The semi-final paired Limerick with Tipperary however Tipperary proved too strong on the day and won 6–19 to 2–07.

In 2009 following the heavy loss to Tipperary, McCarthy dropped a number of high-profile players from the training panel for the 2010 season which led to a number of other players not making themselves available. In January 2010, members of the ousted Limerick hurling panel issued a lengthy statement hitting out at McCarthy and his management team ahead of the EGM of all county board delegates. The statement highlighted their six main issues detailing back to the lack of communication in the lead up to the announcement of McCarthy's winter training panel in November 2009. A vote on McCarthy's leadership took place in December 2009, and it was decided to retain McCarthy's services as manager. His role as Limerick hurling manager came under more pressure in March 2010 as it became clear that a special county board meeting had been arranged. At the meeting on 23 March, McCarthy retained his post following a failed vote of no confidence. On 19 July 2010 McCarthy resigned as manager after his side was knocked out of the qualifiers by Offaly.

== Personal life ==
Born in Passage West, County Cork in 1945, McCarthy was raised in a family that had a strong association with hurling. His uncles, Batt and Ger O'Mahony, played with the Young Irelands club in Boston and won the North American championship in 1934.

McCarthy began his working life as a boilermaker at the Verolme Cork Dockyard. He took up a position as Cork sales rep with Tedcastles Oil Products in 1978, before later becoming the Munster area sales and marketing manager.

McCarthy married former Miss Cork, Patricia Culloty, in Buttevant July 1972. His son, also named Justin McCarthy, has worked as a political correspondent with Today FM and RTÉ.

== Career statistics ==
Team	Year	National League			Munster		All-Ireland		Total	
Team	Year	Division	Apps	Score	Apps	Score	Apps	Score	Apps	Score
Cork	1963-64	Division 1A	0	0-00	2	0-01	—		2	0-01
Cork	1964-65	Division 1A	4	0-04	3	0-02	—		7	0-06
Cork	1965-66	Division 1B	6	2-09	4	2-02	1	0-02	11	4-13
Cork	1966-67	Division 1B	5	0-15	1	0-00	—		6	0-16
Cork	1967-68	Division 1B	5	0-08	2	1-02	—		7	1-10
Cork	1968-69	Division 1B	6	1-01	4	0-00	0	0-00	10	1-01
Cork	1969-70	Division 1B	0	0-00	0	0-00	0	0-00	0	0-00
Cork	1970-71	Division 1A	5	0-00	1	0-01	—		6	0-00
Cork	1971-72	Division 1A	8	1-02	3	0-04	2	0-06	13	1-12
Cork	1972-73	Division 1A	0	0-00	0	0-00	—		0	0-00
Cork	1973-74	Division 1A	5	0-07	1	0-00	—		6	0-07
Career total			44	4-46	21	3-12	3	0-08	68	7-66

== Honours ==
=== Player ===
Shamrocks

- South East Junior A Hurling Championship: 1981

Cork

- All-Ireland Senior Hurling Championship: 1966
- Munster Senior Hurling Championship: 1966, 1969, 1972
- National Hurling League: 1968–69, 1971–72, 1973–74
- All-Ireland Under-21 Hurling Championship: 1966
- Munster Under-21 Hurling Championship: 1966

Munster

- Railway Cup: 1968, 1969

=== Management ===
Shamrocks

- South East Junior A Hurling Championship: 1981

Cashel King Cormacs

- Munster Senior Club Hurling Championship: 1991
- Tipperary Senior Hurling Championship: 1991

Antrim

- All-Ireland Intermediate Hurling Championship: 1970
- Ulster Intermediate Hurling Championship: 1970

Clare

- National Hurling League: 1976–77, 1977–78

Cork

- All-Ireland Senior Hurling Championship: 1984
- Munster Senior Hurling Championship: 1975, 1984, 1985

Waterford

- Munster Senior Hurling Championship: 2002, 2004, 2007
- National Hurling League: 2007

Awards
Preceded by Jimmy Doyle	Caltex Hurler of the Year; 1966	Succeeded by Ollie Walsh
Sporting positions
Preceded by Johnny Clifford	Cork senior hurling team coach (jointly with Michael O'Brien); 1984–1985	Succeeded by Johnny Clifford
Preceded by Gerald McCarthy	Waterford senior hurling team manager 2001–2008	Succeeded by Davy FitzGerald
Preceded by Richie Bennis	Limerick senior hurling team manager 2008–2010	Succeeded by Dónal O'Grady
Achievements
Preceded by Pat Henderson	All-Ireland Senior Hurling Final winning coach (jointly with Michael O'Brien); 1984	Succeeded by Dermot Healy
