= Jim Russell (hurler) =

Irish hurler

Personal information
- Native name: Séamus Ruiséil (Irish)
- Born: 1 May 1897 Shanbally, County Cork, Ireland
- Died: 8 January 2001 (aged 103) Rochestown, County Cork, Ireland
- Occupation: Fitter

Sport
- Sport: Hurling
- Position: Centre-back
Club
- Years: Club
- 1912-1926: Shamrocks
Club titles
- Cork titles: 0
Inter-county
Years	County	Apps (scores)
1920-1924	Cork	0 (0-00)
Inter-county titles
- Munster titles: 1
- All-Irelands: 0

James Russell (1 May 1897 – 8 January 2001) was an Irish hurler who played at club level with Shamrocks and at inter-county level with the Cork senior hurling team.

== Career ==
Russell was first introduced to hurling as a schoolboy. He played his first game for the Shamrocks club in 1912 and won a Cork IHC title after a defeat of Castletownroche in 1915. He also lined out the following year when Shamrocks were beaten by Midleton in the senior final. Russell joined the Cork senior hurling team in 1920 and was an unused substitute in that year's All-Ireland final defeat by Dublin. He later lined out with the Cork junior hurling team.

== Personal life and death ==
Russell was born in Shanbally, County Cork in May 1897. After his national schooling at Ringaskiddy, he trained to be a fitter-turner at the Royal Navy Dockyard in Haulbowline. Russell emigrated to New York City in 1926. After initially working as a fitter he joined the U.S. Civil Service in 1937. Russell returned to Cork after his retirement in 1961. He died at a nursing home in Rochestown on 8 January 2001, aged 103.

== Honours ==
Shamrocks

- Cork Intermediate Hurling Championship: 1915

Cork

- Munster Senior Hurling Championship: 1920
