= 2024 Cork Junior A Hurling Championship =

- Dates: 10–30 November 2024
- Teams: 7
- Sponsor: Co-Op Superstores
- Champions: Tracton (3rd title); Rory Sinclair (captain); Kieran Kingston (manager)
- Runners-up: Killavullen; Liam Cronin (captain); Niall Hanrahan (manager)

Tournament statistics
- Matches played: 6
- Goals scored: 10 (1.67 per match)
- Points scored: 198 (33 per match)
- Top scorer(s): Daniel Walsh (0-26)

The 2024 Cork Junior A Hurling Championship was the 127th staging of the Cork Junior A Hurling Championship since its establishment by the Cork County Board in 1895. The championship ran from 10 to 30 November 2024.

The final was played on 30 November 2024 at Páirc Uí Rinn in Cork, between Tracton and Killavullen, in what was their first ever meeting in the final. Tracton won the match by 1–15 to 1–10 to claim their third championship title overall and a first title in 45 years.

Killeagh's Daniel Walsh was the championship's top scorer with 0-26.

== Team changes ==
=== To Championship ===
Relegated from the Cork Premier Junior Hurling Championship

- Tracton

=== From Championship ===
Promoted to the Cork Premier Junior Hurling Championship

- Nemo Rangers

== Qualification ==
Division	Championship	Champions	#
Avondhu	North Cork Junior A Hurling Championship	Killavullen	
Carbery	Carbery Junior A Hurling Championship	Diarmuid Ó Mathúna's	
Carrigdhoun	South East Junior A Hurling Championship	Tracton	
Duhallow	Duhallow Junior A Hurling Championship	Dromtarriffe	
Imokilly	East Cork Junior A Hurling Championship	Killeagh	
Muskerry	Mid Cork Junior A Hurling Championship	Ballinora	
Seandún	Cork City Junior A Hurling Championship	Whitechurch	

== Results ==
=== Bracket ===
Quarter-Finals
Diarmuid Ó Mathúna's (Carbery)	0–12
Ballinora (Muskerry)	2–18
Dromtarriffe (Duhallow)	1–14
Killavullen (Avondhu)	1–20
Killeagh (Imokilly)	0–28 (aet)
Whitechurch (Seandún)	1–24

Semi-Finals
Ballinora (Muskerry)	1-12
Tracton (Carrigdhoun)	1-16
Killavullen (Avondhu)	1-14
Killeagh (Imokilly)	0-15

Final
Tracton (Carrigdhoun)	1-15
Killavullen (Avondhu)	1-10

=== Quarter-finals ===
10 November 2024 Quarter-final	Diarmuid Ó Mathúna's	0-12 - 2-18	Ballinora	Ovens Grounds
		Report

10 November 2024 Quarter-final	Dromtarriffe	1-14 - 1-20	Killavullen	Fr Kelleher Park
	B Murphy 0-6, E Murphy 0-4, T Howard 1-0, J Murphy 0-3, K Cremin 0-1.	Report	C O'Mahony 0-8, J Magner 0-5, M O'Connor 1-1, P Looney 0-2, D O'Grady 0-2, E Cotter 0-1, O Magner 0-1.

10 November 2024 Quarter-final	Killeagh	0-28 - 1-24 (aet)	Whitechurch	Páirc Séamus de Barra
	D Walsh 0-17.	Report	C Egan 0-13, S Keane 1-3.

=== Semi-finals ===
17 November 2024 Semi-final	Tracton	1-16 - 1-12	Ballinora	Páirc Liam Mhic Cárthaigh
	R Walsh 1-7 (6F) P O’Riordan 0-3 D Byrne 0-2, C Quinn, M Byrne, J Kingston, M O’Sullivan 0-1	Report	S Kingston 0-3 (2F, 165), K Murphy 1-0 T Burns 0-2, D Dineen M Quirke, J Byrne, D Holmes D Corkery, A O’Shea, J Keohane 0-1.

17 November 2024 Semi-final	Killavullen	1-15 - 0-14	Killeagh	Páirc Bhríde
	J Magner 0-7 (0-5 f, 0-1 65), C O’Mahony 0-4, M Cagney 1-0, E Cotter 0-2, L Fox, O Magner 0-1 each.	Report	D Walsh 0-9 (0-7 f), B Walsh, D Motherway 0-2 each, K Budds 0-1.

=== Final ===
30 November 2024 Final	Tracton	1-15 - 1-10	Killavullen	Páirc Uí Rinn
	R Walsh 0-10 (0-7 f, 0-2 65), M O’Sullivan 1-1, M Byrne 0-3, P O’Riordan 0-1.	Report	J Magner 1-4 (1-0 pen, 0-2 f, 0-1 65), C O’Mahony (0-1 f), L Fox 0-2 each, D O’Grady, O Maguire 0-1 each.

== Championship statistics ==
=== Top scorers ===
Rank	Player	County	Tally	Total	Matches	Average
1	Daniel Walsh	Killeagh	0-26	26	2	13.00
2	Ronan Walsh	Tracton	1-17	20	2	10.00
3	Jamie Magner	Killavullen	1-16	19	3	6.66
