= 1982 Cork Junior Hurling Championship =

Irish hurling competition

- Dates: 12 September – 14 November 1982
- Teams: 7
- Champions: Castletownroche (2nd title); Paddy Roche (captain); Derry Mannix (manager)
- Runners-up: Delaneys

Tournament statistics
- Matches played: 6
- Goals scored: 32 (5.33 per match)
- Points scored: 118 (19.67 per match)
- Top scorer(s): Dave Relihan (1-14)

The 1982 Cork Junior Hurling Championship was the 85th staging of the Cork Junior Hurling Championship since its establishment by the Cork County Board. The draw for the opening round fixtures took place on 31 January 1982. The championship ran from 12 September to 14 November 1982.

The final was played on 14 November 1982 at the Castlelyons Grounds between Castletownroche and Delaneys, in what was their first ever meeting in the final. Castletownroche won the match by 5-18 to 3-04 to claim their second championship title overall and a first title in 22 years.

Castletownroche's Dave Relihan was the championship's top scorer with 1-14.

== Qualification ==
Division	Championship	Champions
Avondhu	North Cork Junior A Hurling Championship	Castletownroche
Carbery	South West Junior A Hurling Championship	Barryroe
Carrigdhoun	South East Junior A Hurling Championship	Carrigaline
Duhallow	Duhallow Junior A Hurling Championship	Meelin
Imokilly	East Cork Junior A Hurling Championship	Midleton
Muskerry	Mid Cork Junior A Hurling Championship	Ballinora
Seandún	City Junior A Hurling Championship	Delaneys

== Results ==
=== Quarter-finals ===
12 September 1982 Quarter-final	Carrigaline	3-13 - 1-10	Ballinora	Páirc Uí Chaoimh
	J Drinan 0-7, B Scanlon 1-1, M Harrington 1-1, K O'Sullivan 1-0, A Deasy 0-2, T O'Donovan 0-1, A Fahy 0-1.		J Murphy 0-4, T Hourihan 1-0, M Callanan 0-3, J O'Sullivan 0-2, P Lane 0-1.

19 September 1982 Quarter-final	Midleton	3-04 - 1-07	Meelin	Páirc Mac Gearailt
	D Hurley 2-1, K O'Hanlon 1-0, C O'Neill 0-1, E Harty 0-1, P O'Farrell 0-1.		B O'Connor 1-2, N Brosnan 0-2, J O'Sullivan 0-1, P O'Connor 0-1, M Fitzpatrick 0-1.

26 September 1982 Quarter-final	Castletownroche	5-14 - 0-04	Barryroe	Páirc Uí Chaoimh
	R Magner 3-1, T Hogan 2-0, Dave Relihan 0-5, F Fallon 0-3, D Mellerick 0-2, N Flynn 0-1, P Roche 0-1, M Magner 0-1.		K White 0-2, M Moloney 0-1, J Tobin 0-1.	Referee: W Horgan (Brian Dillons)

- Delaneys received a bye in this round.

=== Semi-finals ===
10 October 1982 Semi-final	Castletownroche	2-17 - 3-08	Carrigaline	Páirc Uí Chaoimh
	Dave Relihan 0-6, M Magner 1-2, N Flynn 1-1, W Walsh 0-4, F Fallon 0-3, P Roche 0-1.		A Fahy 1-2, M Fitzgerald 1-1, B Scanlon 1-0, R Foster 0-2, J O'Donovan 0-1, J Drinan 0-1.

31 October 1982 Semi-final	Delaneys	2-11 - 2-08	Midleton	Caherlag Grounds
	M Treacy 1-2, P O'Sullivan 0-5, M Sloane 1-1, T Walsh 0-2, P O'Connell 0-1.		P Farrell 1-0, K O'Hanlon 1-0, C O'Neill 0-3, D Hurley 0-2, J Hennessy 0-2, K Coakley 0-1.

=== Final ===
14 November 1982 Final	Castletownroche	5-18 - 3-04	Delaneys	Castlelyons Grounds
	T Hogan 2-1, Dave Relihan 1-3, M Magner 1-2, F Fallon 0-4, N Walsh 0-4, D Mellerick 1-0, R Magner 0-3, P Roche 0-1.		M Treacy 1-1, P Boyd 1-0, R Barry 1-0, P O'Sullivan 0-2, E Healy 0-1.	Referee: M O'Flaherty (Blackrock)

== Championship statistics ==
=== Top scorers ===
Overall

Rank	Player	Club	Tally	Total	Matches	Average
1	Dave Relihan	Castletownroche	1-14	17	3	5.66
2	Tim Hogan	Castletownroche	4-01	13	3	4.33
2	Richard Magnier	Castletownroche	3-04	13	3	4.33
4	Mick Magnier	Castletownroche	2-05	11	3	3.66
5	Frank Fallon	Castletownroche	0-10	10	3	3.33

In a single game

Rank	Player	Club	Tally	Total	Opposition
1	Richard Magnier	Castletownroche	3-01	10	Barryroe
2	Des Hurley	Midleton	2-01	7	Meelin
2	Tim Hogan	Castletownroche	2-01	7	Delaneys
2	John Drinan	Carrigaline	0-07	7	Ballinora
5	Tim Hogan	Castletownroche	2-00	6	Barryroe
5	Dave Relihan	Castletownroche	1-03	6	Delaneys
5	Dave Relihan	Castletownroche	0-06	6	Carrigaline
8	Bernie O'Connor	Meelin	1-02	5	Midleton
8	Mick Magnier	Castletownroche	1-02	5	Carrigaline
8	Aidan Fahy	Carrigaline	1-02	5	Castletownroche
8	Mick Treacy	Delaneys	1-02	5	Midleton
8	Mick Magnier	Castletownroche	1-02	5	Delaneys
8	Dave Relihan	Castletownroche	0-05	5	Barryroe
8	Pat O'Sullivan	Delaneys	0-05	5	Midleton
