= 1908 Cork Junior Hurling Championship =

Irish hurling competition

- Champions: Shamrocks (2nd title)
- Runners-up: Midleton

The 1908 Cork Junior Hurling Championship was the 14th staging of the Cork Junior Hurling Championship since its establishment by the Cork County Board in 1895.

The final was played on 8 November 1908 at the Athletic Grounds in Queenstown, between Shamrocks and Midleton, in what was their first ever meeting in the final. Shamrocks won the match by 2-16 to 0-03 to claim their second championship title overall and a first championship title in four years.

== Results ==
=== Final ===
8 November 1908 Final	Shamrocks	2-16 - 0-03	Midleton	Queenstown Athletic Grounds
