= Nathan Walsh (Gaelic footballer) =

Irish Gaelic footballer

Personal information
- Nickname: Nate Dogg/Nathanator
- Born: 1998 (age 27–28) Douglas, Cork, Ireland

Sport
- Sport: Gaelic Football
- Position: Right corner-back
Club
- Years: Club
- Douglas
Club titles
- Cork titles: 0
College
- Years: College
- University College Cork
College titles
- Sigerson titles: 1
Inter-county*
Years	County	Apps (scores)
2019-	Cork	2 (0-00)
Inter-county titles
- Munster titles: 0
- All-Irelands: 0
- NFL: 0
- All Stars: 0
- *Inter County team apps and scores correct as of 16:00, 23 June 2019.

Nathan Walsh (born 1998) is an Irish Gaelic footballer who plays for Cork Senior Championship club Douglas and at inter-county level with the Cork senior football team. He usually lines out as a right corner-back.

== Honours ==
University College Cork

- Sigerson Cup (1): 2019

Douglas

- Cork Premier Under-21 A Football Championship (1): 2017
- Cork Premier Under-21 A Hurling Championship (1): 2016
- Cork Premier 1 Minor Hurling Championship (1): 2015

== Career statistics ==
As of match played 22 June 2019.

Team	Year	National League			Munster		All-Ireland		Total	
Team	Year	Division	Apps	Score	Apps	Score	Apps	Score	Apps	Score
Cork	2019	Division 2	0	0-00	2	0-00	0	0-00	2	0-00
Career total			0	0-00	2	0-00	0	0-00	2	0-00

Sporting positions
Preceded by Seán Powter	Cork Minor Football Captain; 2016	Succeeded by Colm O'Callaghan
