= Noel Galvin =

Irish Gaelic footballer

Personal information
- Native name: Nollaig Ó Gealbháin (Irish)
- Born: 6 November 1988 (age 37) Ballincollig, Cork, Ireland
- Height: 5 ft 11 in (180 cm)

Sport
- Sport: Gaelic football
- Position: Left corner-back
Club
- Years: Club
- Ballincollig
Club titles
- Cork titles: 0
Inter-county*
Years	County	Apps (scores)
2010-present	Cork	2 (0-00)
Inter-county titles
- Munster titles: 0
- All-Irelands: 0
- NHL: 0
- All Stars: 0
- *Inter County team apps and scores correct as of 19:47, 24 July 2014.

Noel Galvin (born 6 November 1988) is an Irish Gaelic footballer who plays as a left corner-back for the Cork senior team.

Born in Ballincollig, Cork, Galvin first arrived on the inter-county scene at the age of twenty when he first linked up with the Cork under-21 team. He made his senior debut during the 2010 National Football League, however, it took a number of years before he joined Cork's championship team. Since then Galvin has become a regular member of the starting fifteen.

At club level Galvin plays both hurling and Gaelic football with Ballincollig.

== Honours ==
=== Team ===
Cork Institute of Technology

- Sigerson Cup (1): 2009

Ballincollig

- Cork Under-21 Football Championship (1): 2007

Cork

- All-Ireland Under-21 Football Championship (1): 2009
- Munster Under-21 Football Championship (1): 2009
