= 1957 Cork Junior Hurling Championship =

Irish hurling competition

- Dates: 29 September – 17 November 1957
- Teams: 7
- Champions: Tracton (1st title)
- Runners-up: Courcey Rovers

Tournament statistics
- Matches played: 6
- Goals scored: 41 (6.83 per match)
- Points scored: 62 (10.33 per match)

The 1957 Cork Junior Hurling Championship was the 60th staging of the Cork Junior Hurling Championship since its establishment by the Cork County Board in 1895. The championship ran from 29 September to 17 November 1957.

The final was played on 17 November 1957 at the Athletic Grounds in Kinsale, between Tracton and Courcey Rovers, in what was their first ever meeting in the final. Tracton won the match by 4-05 to 3-04 to claim their first ever championship title.

== Results ==
=== Quarter-finals ===
| 29 September 1957 Quarter-final | Banteer | 4-05 - 3-04 | St Vincent's | Bishop Casey Memorial Park |

| 29 September 1957 Quarter-final | Tracton | 4-06 - 2-08 | St Catherine's | Cork Athletic Grounds |

| 6 October 1957 Quarter-final | Cloughduv | 7-04 - 1-06 | Castletownroche | Banteer Sportsfield |

- Courcey Rovers received a bye in this round.

=== Semi-finals ===
| 13 October 1957 Semi-final | Courcey Rovers | 3-07 - 1-04 | Banteer | Castle Grounds |

| 27 October 1957 Semi-final | Tracton | 5-04 - 4-05 | Cloughduv | Cork Athletic Grounds |

=== Final ===
| 17 November 1957 Final | Tracton | 4-05 - 3-04 | Courcey Rovers | Kinsale Athletic Grounds |
