= 1930 Cork Junior Football Championship =

Irish Gaelic football competition

- Champions: Clonakilty (1st title); D. O'Donovan (captain)
- Runners-up: Ballincollig

The 1930 Cork Junior Football Championship was the 32nd staging of the Cork Junior Football Championship since its establishment by the Cork County Board in 1895.

The final was played on 14 December 1930 at the Kinsale Grounds, between Clonakilty and Ballincollig, in what was their first ever meeting in the final. Clonakilty won the match by 2–03 to 0–00 to claim their first ever championship title.

== Results ==
=== Final ===
| 14 December 1930 Final | Clonakilty | 2-03 - 0-00 | Ballincollig | Kinsale Grounds |
