= 1915 Cork Intermediate Football Championship =

Gaelic football competition

- Champions: Fermoy (1st title)
- Runners-up: Kinsale

The 1915 Cork Intermediate Football Championship was the seventh staging of the Cork Intermediate Football Championship since its establishment by the Cork County Board in 1909.

The final was played on 5 December 1915 at the Athletic Grounds in Cork, between Fermoy and Kinsale, in what was their first ever meeting in the final. Fermoy won the match by 1–02 to 0–00 to claim their first ever championship title.

== Results ==
=== Final ===
5 December 1915 Final	Fermoy	1-02 - 0-00	Kinsale	Cork Athletic Grounds
