= 1979 Cork Junior Hurling Championship =

Irish hurling competition

- Teams: 7
- Champions: Tracton (2nd title); Michael O'Brien (manager)
- Runners-up: Castletownroche

Tournament statistics
- Goals scored: 2

The 1979 Cork Junior Hurling Championship was the 82nd staging of the Cork Junior Hurling Championship since its establishment by the Cork County Board.

On 11 November 1979, Tracton won the championship following a 4–12 to 1–06 defeat of Castletownroche in the final at Páirc Uí Chaoimh. This was their second championship title overall and their first title since 1957.

== Results ==
=== Quarter-finals ===
9 September 1979 Quarter-final	Erin's Own	5-11 - 0-06	Newmarket	Castletownroche GAA Grounds
	T Aherne 3-0, B Murphy 1-2, R O'Connor 0-4, K Byrne 1-0, M Bowen 0-2, J Bowen 0-2, PJ Murphy 0-1.		S Daly 0-2, J Cronin 0-1, T Burke 0-1, TD Cronin 0-1, J Burke 0-1.

23 September 1979 Quarter-final	Newcestown	0-13 - 2-02	Blarney	Coachford Sportsfield

7 October 1979 Quarter-final	Tracton	3-14 - 1-05	Na Piarsaigh	Páirc Uí Chaoimh
	F Canty 2-5, T Kelly 1-1, M Collins 0-3, Diarmuid Lynch 0-1, J Kingston 0-1, E Jagoe 0-1, A Kiely 0-1, Denis Lynch 0-1.		N Geaney 1-0, R Murphy 0-3, T Coakley 0-1, J O'Sullivan 0-1.

=== Semi-finals ===
14 October 1979 Semi-final	Tracton	1-12 - 1-06	Newcestown	Ballinspittle GAA Grounds
	F Canty 0-5, Denis Lynch 1-1, J Kingston 0-2, P Walsh 0-2, D Lynch 0-1, V Dempsey 0-1.		N Collins 1-1, T Crowley 0-3, J O'Leary 0-1, S McCarthy 0-1.	Referee: M Keane (Cloughduv)

14 October 1979 Semi-final	Castletownroche	1-09 - 1-09	Erin's Own	Castlelyons GAA Grounds
	Dan Relihan 1-1, T Hogan 0-2, R Magnier 0-2, M Magner 0-2, W Walsh 0-1, Dave Relihan 0-1.		G Bowen 1-2, J Bowen 0-3, K Byrne 0-2, T Ahern 0-1, R O'Connor 0-1.

21 October 1979 Semi-final replay	Castletownroche	0-13 - 1-05	Erin's Own	Castlelyons GAA Grounds
				Referee: M English (Bishopstown)

=== Final ===
11 November 1979 Final	Tracton	4-12 - 1-06	Castletownroche	Páirc Uí Chaoimh
	F Canty 2-6, P Walsh 1-3, M Collins 1-1, J Kingston 0-1, Diarmuid Lynch 0-1.		J Magnier 1-0, W Walsh 0-2, Dan Relihan 0-1, R Relihan 0-1, M Magnier 0-1, Dave Relihan 0-1.	Referee: J Motherway
