= Robert Emmets GAA (Cork) =

Gaelic Athletic Association club in County Cork, Ireland

Robert Emmets GAA was a Gaelic Athletic Association club based in Monkstown, County Cork, Ireland. It competed in competitions organized by the Carrigdhoun division of Cork. The club was primarily successful in Gaelic football and won the Carrigdhoun Junior Football Championship on three occasions. The club is now defunct. The club went defunct after the 1986 season.

== Achievements ==
- Carrigdhoun Junior Football Championship Winners (3) 1950, 1954, 1956 | Runners-Up 1958, 1962
- South-East Under 21 "A" Football Championship Runners-Up (2) 1979, 1980
- South-East Minor "A" Football Championship Winners (2) 1956, 1978
- Cork Intermediate A Hurling Championship Winners (1) 1917
- South East Junior "B" Football Championship Winners (2) 1980, 1985
