= South East Junior A Football Championship =

Gaelic sports competition

- Irish: Craobh Peile Sóisear A Carrigdhoun
- Code: Gaelic football
- Founded: 1929; 97 years ago
- Region: Carrigdhoun (GAA)
- No. of teams: 7
- Title holders: Carrigaline (14th title)
- Most titles: Kinsale (18 titles)
- Sponsors: The Huntsman Bar & Restaurant
- Official website: Carrigdhoun GAA

The South East Junior A Football Championship (known for sponsorship reasons as the Huntsman Bar & Restaurant Junior A Football Championship) is an annual club Gaelic football competition organised by the Carrigdhoun Board of the Gaelic Athletic Association and contested by junior-ranked teams in the southeastern region of County Cork, Ireland, deciding the competition winners through a group and knockout format.

Introduced in 1929 as the South East Junior Football Championship, it was initially a straight knockout tournament. The competition went through a number of format changes since then, including the introduction of a back-door or second chance for beaten teams.

In its present format, the seven teams are drawn into two groups and play each other in a single round-robin system. The two group winners and two group runners-up proceed to the knockout phase that culminates with the final. The winner of the South East Junior A Championship qualifies for the subsequent Cork Junior A Football Championship.

The title has been won at least once by 14 different clubs. The all-time record-holders are Kinsale, who have won a total of 18 titles. Carrigaline are the title-holders after defeating Ballygarvan by 1–09 to 0–07 in the 2026 final.

== Teams ==
=== 2026 Teams ===
The 7 teams competing in the 2026 South East Junior A Football Championship are:

Club	Location	Colours	Position in 2026	In Championship since	Championship Titles	Last Championship Title
Ballinhassig	Ballinhassig	Blue and white	Semi-finals	1929	4	2021
Ballygarvan	Ballygarvan	Red and white	Runners-up	1980	8	2025
Ballymartle	Riverstick	Green and gold	Group stage	1983	1	2018
Carrigaline	Carrigaline	Blue and yellow	Champions	2019	14	2026
Courcey Rovers	Ballinspittle	Red and white	Semi-finals	2011	5	2011
Shamrocks	Shanbally	Green and white	Group stage	1965	13	2016
Valley Rovers	Innishannon	Green and white	Group stage	1929	16	2020

== Roll of Honour ==
=== By club ===
#	Club	Titles	Runners-up	Championships won	Championships runner-up
1	Kinsale	18	15	1930, 1932, 1945, 1946, 1949, 1953, 1958, 1960, 1961, 1965, 1973, 1974, 1976, 1978, 1999, 2001, 2005, 2022	1937, 1941, 1942, 1947, 1954, 1963, 1964, 1979, 1982, 1983, 1989, 1997, 1998, 2000, 2002
2	Valley Rovers	16	5	1937, 1943, 1947, 1951, 1970, 1979, 1981, 1984, 1985, 1986, 1987, 1993, 1995, 1996, 2017, 2020	1936, 1949, 1957, 1994, 2018
3	Carrigaline	14	12	1936, 1938, 1939, 1940, 1955, 1957, 1959, 1967, 1968, 1969, 1990, 1991, 1992, 2026	1952, 1953, 1960, 1965, 1972, 1973, 1977, 1980, 1988, 1996, 2024, 2025
4	Shamrocks	13	13	1931, 1933, 1934, 1971, 1972, 1975, 1977, 1980, 1982, 1988, 1989, 1994, 2016	1966, 1968, 1970, 1974, 1976, 1978, 1984, 1985, 1991, 1992, 2003, 2010, 2015
5	Crosshaven	9	7	1929, 1941, 1942, 1952, 1962, 1963, 1964, 1966, 1998	1930, 1931, 1935, 1955, 1956, 1959, 1961
6	Ballygarvan	8	6	2002, 2003, 2008, 2009, 2014, 2023, 2024, 2025	1993, 1995, 2007, 2011, 2021, 2026
7	Courcey Rovers	5	7	1997, 2000, 2004, 2006, 2011	1975, 1986, 1987, 1990, 2001, 2005, 2014
8	Ballinhassig	4	6	2012, 2015, 2019, 2021	1981, 2008, 2013, 2016, 2022, 2023
9	Tracton	3	8	1983, 2007, 2010	1943, 1967, 1969, 1999, 2004, 2006, 2009, 2012
9	Robert Emmets	3	2	1950, 1954, 1956	1958, 1962
11	Passage West	1	3	1944	1934, 1945, 1946
11	Ballymartle	1	2	2018	2019, 2020
11	Belgooly	1	1	2013	2017
11	Banba	1	0	1935	—
15	Knockavilla	0	3	—	1933, 1939, 1940
15	Naval Services	0	2	—	1950, 1951
15	Rochestown	0	1	—	1932
15	Douglas	0	1	—	1944

=== Notes ===
- Runners-up unknown: 1929, 1938, 1971

== List of Finals ==
Year	Winners		Runners-up		#
Year	Club	Score	Club	Score	#
2026	Carrigaline	1-09	Ballygarvan	0-07	
2025	Ballygarvan	1-14	Carrigaline	0-16	
2024	Ballygarvan	5-11	Carrigaline	2-11	
2023	Ballygarvan	1-15	Ballinhassig	1-05	
2022	Kinsale	2-15	Ballinhassig	0-04	
2021	Ballinhassig	1-07	Ballygarvan	1-05	
2020	Valley Rovers	1-14	Ballymartle	1-04	
2019	Ballinhassig	1-14	Ballymartle	2-08	
2018	Ballymartle	1-14	Valley Rovers	0-07	
2017	Valley Rovers	1-12	Belgooly	0-09	
2016	Shamrocks	0-09	Ballinhassig	0-08	
2015	Ballinhassig	1-11	Shamrocks	1-09	
2014	Ballygarvan	2-08	Courcey Rovers	1-10	
2013	Belgooly	1-09	Ballinhassig	0-06	
2012	Ballinhassig	1-10	Tracton	0-12	
2011	Courcey Rovers	1-05	Ballygarvan	0-06	
2010	Tracton	1-11	Shamrocks	2-02	
2009	Ballygarvan	0-13	Tracton	1-04	
2008	Ballygarvan	1-13	Ballinhassig	0-07	
2007	Tracton	0-13	Ballygarvan	0-12	
2006	Courcey Rovers	1-08	Tracton	0-09	
2005	Kinsale	0-09	Courcey Rovers	1-05	
2004	Courcey Rovers	1-06	Tracton	0-04	
2003	Ballygarvan	0-13	Shamrocks	0-05	
2002	Ballygarvan	2-11	Kinsale	2-04	
2001	Kinsale	3-10	Courcey Rovers	1-11	
2000	Courcey Rovers	3-04	Kinsale	1-09	
1999	Kinsale	1-07	Tracton	1-06	
1998	Crosshaven	2-09	Kinsale	1-10	
1997	Courcey Rovers	1-09	Kinsale	0-06	
1996	Valley Rovers	2-10	Carrigaline	1-07	
1995	Valley Rovers	2-09	Ballygarvan	1-09	
1994	Shamrocks	0-07	Valley Rovers	0-04	
1993	Valley Rovers	0-12	Ballygarvan	1-01	
1992	Carrigaline	2-05	Shamrocks	2-03	
1991	Carrigaline	2-12	Shamrocks	1-05	
1990	Carrigaline	2-15	Courcey Rovers	2-04	
1989	Shamrocks	4-09	Kinsale	2-08	
1988	Shamrocks	1-10	Carrigaline	0-04	
1987	Valley Rovers	2-10	Courcey Rovers	0-06	
1986	Valley Rovers	3-15	Courcey Rovers	0-08	
1985	Valley Rovers	2-10	Shamrocks	2-09	
1984	Valley Rovers	2-07	Shamrocks	2-06	
1983	Tracton	1-02	Kinsale	0-02	
1982	Shamrocks	2-09	Kinsale	1-09	
1981	Valley Rovers	1-09	Ballinhassig	0-05	
1980	Shamrocks	2-07	Carrigaline	0-05	
1979	Valley Rovers	1-08	Kinsale	1-03	
1978	Kinsale	3-07	Shamrocks	1-06	
1977	Shamrocks	2-09	Carrigaline	2-05	
1976	Kinsale	3-08	Shamrocks	1-12	
1975	Shamrocks	0-14	Courcey Rovers	2-02	
1974	Kinsale	2-09	Shamrocks	2-05	
1973	Kinsale	0-16	Carrigaline	0-03	
1972	Shamrocks	2-07	Carrigaline	1-02	
1971	Shamrocks		—		
1970	Valley Rovers	3-07	Shamrocks	0-07	
1969	Carrigaline	0-09	Tracton	1-03	
1968	Carrigaline	1-05	Shamrocks	1-05	
1967	Carrigaline	2-09	Tracton	1-01	
1966	Crosshaven	1-06	Shamrocks	0-07	
1965	Kinsale	3-07	Carrigaline	3-02	
1964	Crosshaven	4-07	Kinsale	1-10	
1963	Crosshaven	2-09	Kinsale	2-08	
1962	Crosshaven	2-06	Robert Emmets	1-06	
1961	Kinsale	4-10	Crosshaven	1-04	
1960	Kinsale	2-09	Carrigaline	0-01	
1959	Carrigaline	0-09	Crosshaven	0-07	
1958	Kinsale	1-07	Robert Emmets	0-03	
1957	Carrigaline	2-05	Valley Rovers	1-04	
1956	Robert Emmets	2-06	Crosshaven	0-05	
1955	Carrigaline	1-06	Crosshaven	0-01	
1954	Robert Emmets	1-09	Kinsale	3-01	
1953	Kinsale	2-05	Carrigaline	1-03	
1952	Crosshaven	3-02	Carrigaline	1-02	
1951	Valley Rovers	2-02	Naval Services	0-02	
1950	Robert Emmets	2-04	Naval Services	0-04	
1949	Kinsale	2-02	Valley Rovers	2-01	
1948	No final				
1947	Valley Rovers		Kinsale		
1946	Kinsale	w/o	Passage	scr.	
1945	Kinsale	1-07	Passage	1-03	
1944	Passage	5-03	Douglas	1-00	
1943	Valley Rovers		Tracton		
1942	Crosshave	1-04	Kinsale	1-03	
1941	Crosshave	2-06	Kinsale	2-03	
1940	Carrigaline	0-02	Knockavilla	0-00	
1939	Carrigaline	1-05	Knockavilla	0-03	
1938	Carrigaline		—		
1937	Valley Rovers	1-01	Kinsale	0-02	
1936	Carrigaline		Valley Rovers		
1935	Banba	4-01	Crosshaven	0-01	
1934	Shamrocks	2-04	Passage	1-01	
1933	Shamrocks	1-06	Knockavilla	0-01	
1932	Kinsale		Rochestown		
1931	Shamrocks		Crosshaven		
1930	Kinsale		Crosshaven		
1929	Crosshaven		—		

Notes:

- 1948 - The championship declared null and void after finalists Kinsale and Valley Rovers were disqualified after objections and counter objections.
- 1952 - The first match ended in a draw: Crosshaven 2-01, Carrigaline 1-04.
- 1971 - Shamrocks were awarded the title after the other semi-finalists, Valley Rovers and Crosshaven, were disqualified.

== Records ==
=== Gaps ===
Top ten longest gaps between successive championship titles:

- 37 years: Shamrocks (1934-1971)
- 34 years: Carrigaline (1992-2026)
- 32 years: Crosshaven (1966-1998)
- 24 years: Tracton (1983-2007)
- 22 years: Shamrocks (1994-2016)
- 21 years: Carrigaline (1969-1990)
- 21 years: Valley Rovers (1996-2017)
- 21 years: Kinsale (1978-1999)
- 19 years: Valley Rovers (1951-1970)
- 17 years: Kinsale (2005-2022)
- 15 years: Carrigaline (1940-1955)

==== By decade ====
The most successful team of each decade, judged by number of South-East Junior Football Championship titles, is as follows:

- 1930's: Shamrocks (3) 1931-33-34 & Carrigaline (3) 1936-38-39
- 1940's: Kinsale (3) 1945-46-49
- 1950's: Robert Emmets (3) 1950-54-56 & Carrigaline 1955-57-59
- 1960's: Crosshaven (4) 1962-63-64-66
- 1970's: Shamrocks (5) 1971-72-75-76-77
- 1980's: Valley Rovers (5) 1981-84-85-86-87
- 1990's: Carrigaline (3) 1990-91-92 & Valley Rovers (3) 1993-95-96
- 2000's: Ballygarvan (4) 2002-03-08-09
- 2010's: Ballinhassig (3) 2012-15-19
- 2020's: Ballygarvan (3) 2023-24-25

== See also ==
- South East Junior A Hurling Championship
