= Valley Rovers GAA =

Gaelic games club in County Cork, Ireland

Valley Rovers
- Fanaithe na Claise
- Founded: 1919
- County: Cork
- Colours
- Grounds: Innishannon "The Bleach", Brinny
- Coordinates: 51°47′06.00″N 8°41′30.87″W

Playing kits
Standard colours

Valley Rovers GAA Club is a Gaelic Athletic Association club in the parish of Innishannon in County Cork, Ireland. The club was formed in 1919 when two teams in the parish, Innishannon and Knockavilla, came together. The club fields teams in hurling, camogie, Gaelic football and Ladies' football. It participates in the Carrigdhoun division of Cork GAA.

As of 2020, the club were playing at Premier senior level in football and Premier intermediate level in hurling. The club won the Cork Intermediate Hurling Championship title twice, first in 1989 and two decades later in the 2009 Cork Intermediate Hurling Championship.

== History ==
Before the foundation of the current club, two active clubs in the South-West division were playing that as Knockavilla and Innishannon. Richard Barret, commonly known as "Dick Barret" was a secretary of Knockavilla and was the principal of the local primary school. He was executed on 8 December 1922 during the Irish Civil War, and a "Dick Barret memorial shield" is contested as an U15 competition, where the semi-final is held In Innishannon and the final is then held at Oliver Plunketts GAA.

Before the foundation of the current Valley Rovers club, another local club reached the county minor football finals three times in at row between 1915 and 1917. They won in 1916. During this Knockavilla played the 1915 Cork Junior Football Final in 1915 and beat South-East outfit Shamrocks 1-04 to 1-00 and then lost to Carrigtwohill 1-02 to 1-00 in the Cork Junior Hurling Final in the same year. They once again got to the football county final but lost to Midleton 5-02 to 0-00.

In 1930, Valley Rovers reached the South-West Hurling final, losing to Clonakilty who eventually went on to win the county final.

In 2008, the club claimed the Cork County intermediate football title. Wins against Aghabullogue, Macroom (after a replay) and Ballydesmond set up a final meeting with Kildorrery. This final was played in Páirc Uí Rinn and the team won on a scoreline of 1–12 to 3–4. The year was capped by victory in the Division 3 league final over Ballinora.

== Ladies football ==
The adult section of the ladies football club was created in 1995, followed by a junior section in 1999, which won the U14 C County in their first year. The club competes in both the West Cork League and County championship. The adult team won a Junior B title in 2008 and an U21B title in 2009. An U16 county title was won in 2009. A new grading system was brought in for 2010 with the Junior A Championship being regraded as Intermediate.

== Camogie ==
The Camogie Club was founded in 1987. It caters for the ages of U7 through to Senior B. The adult section of the club captured a Junior B title in 1995 followed by a Junior A title in 1996. Their next adult title was in 2004, when they won a Junior A County and League double.

Over the years, the club has had representation the Cork county camogie team. Elaine Burke captained Cork in 2005 to their 21st All Ireland Senior title after being nominated by the divisional side Carrigdhoun, who won the Senior A title in 2004. Nancy O' Driscoll (formerly of Éire Óg) also won all-Ireland medals with Cork. Lucy Hawkes has won All Ireland medals at minor, junior, Senior B and Senior A Level, National league div 1 and 2 and has also represented Munster at Junior and Senior level. Clodagh Deasy, Gillian Harrington, and Liz Bugler have all won Munster medals, including All Ireland Senior B medals in 2006. Liz Bugler has also represented Ireland at international level as well as having Junior and minor All Ireland titles. Gillian Harrington also has an All Ireland Junior medal and an Ashbourne shield medal with C.I.T.

== Honours ==
- Cork Premier Intermediate Football Championship (2): 2009, 2014
- Munster Intermediate Club Football Championship (0): (Runners-Up 2014)
- Cork Premier Intermediate Hurling Championship(0): (Runners-Up 2015)
- Cork Intermediate Hurling Championship (2): 1989, 2009
- Cork Intermediate Football Championship (1): 2008 (Runners-Up 1918) (as Knockavilla)
- Cork Junior Football Championship(1) 1916 (as Knockavilla)
- Cork Junior Hurling Championship (1): 1988
- Cork Minor Football Championship (1): 1916
- Cork Minor A Football Championship (2): 1993, 2001
- Cork Under-21 Football Championship (2): 2013, 2015
- Cork Under-21 Hurling Championship (0): (Runners-Up 1985, 2003)
- Carrigdhoun Junior Hurling Championship (9): 1937, 1941, 1949, 1966, 1967, 1968, 1988, 2017, 2018, 2022
- Carrigdhoun Junior Football Championship (16): 1937, 1943, 1947, 1951, 1970, 1979, 1981, 1984, 1985, 1986, 1987, 1993, 1995, 1996, 2017, 2020
- Féile na nGael Division 4 (2): 1976 2005

== Notable players ==
- Kevin Canty - played with Cork and London senior hurling teams
- Con Cottrell - priest and hurler
- Liam Deasy - Irish Republican Army Officer
- Fiachra Lynch - 2010 All-Ireland football winner
- Con Murphy - 4 All-Ireland winner and president of the GAA
- Chris O'Leary - played with Cork and Dublin senior hurling teams
- Brendan O'Sullivan - 1990 All-Ireland Senior Hurling Championship winner
- Alan Quirke - 2010 All-Ireland Senior Football Championship winning goalkeeper
