= Tom Bermingham =

Irish Gaelic footballer

Personal information
- Native name: Tomás Mac Fheorais (Irish)
- Born: 1940 Kildorrery, County Cork, Ireland
- Died: 30 September 2020 (aged 80) Crosshaven, County Cork, Ireland
- Occupation: Welder

Sport
- Sport: Gaelic football
- Position: Full-back
Clubs
- Years: Club
- Kill; Fermoy; Grange → Avondhu; Bantry Blues → Carbery; Crosshaven
Club titles
- Cork titles: 2
Inter-county
Years	County	Apps (scores)
1958-1959 1962-1967	Waterford; Cork	2 (0-00); 0 (0-00)
Inter-county titles
- Munster titles: 1
- All-Irelands: 0
- NFL: 0

Thomas Bermingham (1940 – 30 September 2020) was an Irish Gaelic footballer. He played with club sides Fermoy, Grange, Bantry Blues and Crosshaven, divisional sides Avondhu and Carbery and at inter-county level with Waterford and Cork.

== Playing career ==
Bermingham first played Gaelic football at club level with Kill before transferring to the Fermoy club in 1959. He later joined the Grange club and won two North Cork JAFC titles. Bermingham also earned inclusion on the Avondhu divisional team that won the Cork SFC title in 1961. He subsequently transferred to the Bantry Blues club with whom he won consecutive West Cork JAFC titles. Bermingham won a second Cork SFC title as a member of the Carbery divisional team in 1968. He ended his club career with Crosshaven.

Bermingham's inter-county career began at minor level with Waterford, before later lining out at junior and senior levels. He later declared for Cork and was an unused substitute for the 1962 Munster SFC. Bermingham's inter-county career was subsequently interrupted when, as a welder with Verolme, he was seconded to work on the ship building industry in Holland. He returned to the inter-county scene with the Cork junior team in 1966 before re-joining the senior team the following year. Bermingham was an unused substitute when Cork were beaten by Meath in the 1967 All-Ireland final.

== Death ==
Bermingham died on 30 September 2020, aged 80.

== Honours ==
Grange

- North Cork Junior A Football Championship: 1964, 1966

Bantry Blues

- West Cork Junior A Football Championship: 1968, 1969

Avondhu

- Cork Senior Football Championship: 1961

Carbery

- Cork Senior Football Championship: 1968

Cork

- Munster Senior Football Championship: 1967
- Munster Junior Football Championship: 1966
