= 1915 Cork Intermediate Hurling Championship =

Irish hurling competition

- Champions: Shamrocks (1st title); Ned Flynn (captain)
- Runners-up: Castletownroche; Jim Roche (captain)

The 1915 Cork Intermediate Hurling Championship was the seventh staging of the Cork Intermediate Hurling Championship since its establishment by the Cork County Board in 1909.

The final was played on 12 September 1915 at the Athletic Grounds in Cork, between Shamrocks and Castletownroche, in what was their first ever meeting in the final. Shamrocks won the match by 7–02 to 3–03 to claim their first ever championship title.

== Results ==
=== Final ===
12 September 1915 Final	Shamrocks	7-02 - 3-03	Castletownroche	Cork Athletic Grounds
