= 1964 Cork Intermediate Hurling Championship =

Irish hurling competition

- Dates: 12 April – 20 September 1964
- Teams: 14
- Champions: Castletownroche (1st title); Johnny Browne (captain)
- Runners-up: Youghal

Tournament statistics
- Matches played: 13
- Goals scored: 89 (6.85 per match)
- Points scored: 191 (14.69 per match)

The 1964 Cork Intermediate Hurling Championship was the 55th staging of the Cork Intermediate Hurling Championship since its establishment by the Cork County Board in 1909. The draw for the first round fixtures took place on 26 January 1964. The championship ran from 12 April to 20 September 1964.

The final was played on 20 September 1964 at the Athletic Grounds in Cork, between Castletownroche and Youghal, in what was their first ever meeting in the final. Castletownroche won the match by 4–11 to 3–06 to claim their first ever championship title.

== Results ==
=== First round ===
12 April 1964 First round	Cloyne	3-05 - 2-12	Castletownroche	Cork Athletic Grounds

19 April 1965 First round	Éire Óg	2-07 - 4-08	Ballymartle	Ballinhassig Grounds

3 May 1964 First round	Mallow	3-05 - 4-06	Midleton	Páirc Mhic Gearailt

10 May 1964 First round	Carrigaline	5-07 - 3-05	Ballincollig	Cork Athletic Grounds

21 June 1965 First round	Tracton	4-06 - 1-03	Glen Rovers	Carrigaline Grounds

24 May 1964 First round	Bandon	2-03 - 4-09	Sarsfields	Cork Athletic Grounds

- Rathluirc and Youghal received byes in this round.

=== Quarter-finals ===
19 April 1964 Quarter-final	Youghal	6-14 - 2-06	Rathluirc	Páirc Mhic Gearailt

21 June 1964 Quarter-final	Midleton	6-06 - 1-11	Carrigaline	Cork Athletic Grounds

5 July 1964 Quarter-final	Castletownroche	4-13 - 2-06	Ballymartle	Riverstown Sportsfield
	J Noonan 1-3, R Browne 1-3, J Galvin 1-3, J McCarthy 1-0, J Browne 0-2, B Galvin 0-2.		S Nyhan 1-3, S Kelleher 1-0, O Hurley 0-3.

12 July 1964 Quarter-final	Sarsfields	7-09 - 6-06	Tracton	Cork Athletic Grounds

=== Semi-finals ===
9 August 1964 Semi-final	Castletownroche	1-08 - 2-01	Midleton	Páirc Mhic Gearailt
	R Browne 1-3, C Flynn 0-2, S Murphy 0-1, J McCarthy 0-1, W Walsh 0-1.		G Murphy 1-0, V Flanagan 1-0, D O'Brien 0-1.

23 August 1964 Semi-final	Youghal	5-12 - 3-06	Sarsfields	O'Connell Park

=== Final ===
20 September 1964 Final	Castletownroche	4-11 - 3-06	Youghal	Cork Athletic Grounds
	R Browne 3-2, R Galvin 1-1, J Noonan 0-4, J Browne 0-2, R O'Sullivan 0-1, C Flynn 0-1.		N Gallagher 1-2, G Walsh 1-0, P Curley 1-0, T O'Connell 0-3, J Moloney 0-1.
