= 1970 All-Ireland Intermediate Hurling Championship =

All Ireland Champions
- Winners: Antrim (1st win)
- Captain: Seán Burns
- Manager: Justin McCarthy

All Ireland Runners-up
- Runners-up: Warwickshire

Provincial Champions
- Munster: Kerry
- Leinster: Dublin
- Ulster: Antrim
- Connacht: Not Played

The 1970 All-Ireland Intermediate Hurling Championship was the tenth staging of the All-Ireland Intermediate Hurling Championship since its establishment by the Gaelic Athletic Association in 1961.

Kildare were the defending champions, however, they availed of the right to promotion and contested the All-Ireland Senior Hurling Championship.

The All-Ireland final was played at Croke Park in Dublin on 4 October 1970 between Antrim and Warwickshire, in what was their first ever meeting in the final. Antrim won the match by 4-18 to 3-06 to claim their first ever All-Ireland title.

== Munster Intermediate Hurling Championship ==
=== Munster quarter-finals ===
| 19 April 1970 Quarter-final | Cork | 2-09 - 2-06 | Tipperary | Páirc Mac Gearailt |
| | S Barry 0-6, F Keane 1-0, F Cooper 1-0, DP Curley 0-2, D Lynch 0-1. | | P Dorney 1-0, S Noonan 1-0, N Seymour 0-3, M Rush 0-1, W Moloney 0-1, M Grace 0-1. |

| 3 May 1970 Quarter-final | Kerry | 4-05 - 1-06 | Waterford | Austin Stack Park |
| | T Kenny 2-1, F Thornton 2-0, B Healy 0-2, J O'Sullivan 0-1, P Moriarty 0-1. | | D Patridge 1-0, J Mason 0-2, D Hayes 0-1, M Connolly 0-1, E Fraher 0-1, M Woods 0-1. |

=== Munster semi-finals ===
| 17 May 1970 Semi-final | Kerry | 4-08 - 2-07 | Clare | Gaelic Grounds |
| | P Finnegan 2-1, B Healy 1-1, T Kenny 0-4, F Thornton 1-0, W Maguire 0-1. | | M Clune 1-2, P Cronin 0-4, D Durack 1-0, J O'Connor 0-1. |

| 28 May 1970 Semi-final | Cork | 3-13 - 4-06 | Limerick | Dr. Mannix Sportsfield |
| | S Barry 2-7, F Cooper 1-0, P Curley 0-3, N Gallagher 0-1, J Nodwell 0-1, F Keane 0-1. | | N Bridgeman 2-0, Ben O'Sullivan 1-1, P Ryan 1-0, J Bourke 0-3, D O'Connor 0-1, M o'Sullivan 0-1. |

=== Munster final ===
| 22 July 1970 Final | Cork | 2-10 - 2-13 | Kerry | Bishop Casey Memorial Park |
| | N Gallagher 2-3, P Curley 0-4, K McSweeney 0-2, E Dorney 0-1. | | W Maguire 0-9, F Thornton 2-1, P Finnegan 0-1, E O'Sullivan 0-1, J O'Sullivan 0-1. | Referee: G Fitzgerald (Limerick) |

== All-Ireland Intermediate Hurling Championship ==
=== All-Ireland quarter-final ===
| 30 August 1970 Quarter-final | Galway | 4-06 - 4-14 | Antrim | Dunlo Grounds |

=== All-Ireland semi-finals ===
| 29 August 1970 Semi-final | Warwickshire | 4-05 - 3-07 | Kerry | Gaelic Grounds |
| | C Danaher 3-1, F Gantley 1-0, W Hogan 0-2, M Hanley 0-1, L Maloney 0-1. | | B McGuire 2-2, E O'Sullivan 1-0, T Kenny 0-3, F Thornton 0-2. |

| 13 September 1970 Semi-final | Dublin | 2-11 - 3-15 | Antrim | Croke Park |
| | M Bermingham 2-6, J Kinsella 0-3, M McShane 0-1, S Kennedy 0-1. | | B McGarry 2-1, A McCallin 0-6, S Richmond 1-0, E Donnelly 0-3, S Collins 0-2, A Hamill 0-1, P McShane 0-1, S Burns 0-1. | Referee: J Hatton (Wicklow) |

=== All-Ireland final ===
| 4 October 1970 Final | Antrim | 4-18 - 3-06 | Warwickshire | Croke Park |
| | E Donnelly 2-3, A McCallin 0-4, B McGarry 1-0, T Connolly 1-0, S Burns 0-2, S Collins 0-2, S Richmond 0-2, A Hamill 0-2, P McShane 0-2, N Wheeler 0-1. | | W Hogan 1-1, J Byrne 1-0, F Gantley 1-0, C Danaher 0-2, D Dillane 0-1, S O'Keeffe 0-1, C Crowe 0-1. | Referee: J Hatton (Wicklow) |
