= 1926 Cork Intermediate Hurling Championship =

Irish hurling competition

- Champions: Kinsale (1st title)
- Runners-up: Buttevant

The 1926 Cork Intermediate Hurling Championship was the 17th staging of the Cork Intermediate Hurling Championship since its establishment by the Cork County Board.

The final was played on 21 November 1926 at Turners Cross in Cork, between Kinsale and Buttevant, in what was their first ever meeting in the final. Kinsale won the match by 5–02 to 2–04 to claim their first ever championship title.

== Results ==
=== Final ===
21 November 1926 Final	Kinsale	5-02 - 4-04	Buttevant	Turners Cross
