= David O'Leary (hurler) =

Irish hurler

Personal information
- Native name: Daithí Ó Laoire (Irish)
- Nickname: Cody
- Born: 1925 Castletownroche, County Cork, Ireland
- Died: 21 April 2005 (aged 79) Fermoy, County Cork, Ireland

Sport
- Sport: Hurling
- Position: Centre-back
Clubs
- Years: Club
- Castletownroche; Avondhu
Club titles
- Cork titles: 1
Inter-county
Years	County	Apps (scores)
1952-1954	Cork	0 (0-00)
Inter-county titles
- Munster titles: 1
- All-Irelands: 1
- NHL: 1

David O'Leary (1925 – 21 April 2005) was an Irish hurler who played at club level with Castletownroche, at divisional level with Avondhu and at inter-county level with the Cork senior hurling team. He usually lined out as a defender.

== Playing career ==
O'Leary first came to hurling prominence with the Castletownroche club. In 1942 he was captain of the first minor hurling team to bring a North Cork title to the club. O'Leary progressed through the ranks and ended his career with three North Cork JAHC medals. In 1952 he was a member of the Avondhu team that became the first division to win the Cork SHC title. This victory saw O'Leary being selected for the Cork senior hurling team and he was team captain when winning the National Hurling League title in 1953. He was a reserve when Cork beat Galway in the 1953 All-Ireland final. A knee injury curtailed O'Leary's inter-county career after this, but he continued to play line out at club level and with the Cork junior team.

== Death ==
O'Leary died in Fermoy, County Cork on 21 April 2005.

== Honours ==
Castletownroche

- North Cork Junior A Hurling Championship: 1954, 1956, 1957

Avondhu

- Cork Senior Hurling Championship: 1952

Cork

- All-Ireland Senior Hurling Championship: 1953
- Munster Senior Hurling Championship: 1953
- National Hurling League: 1952-53 (c)
