= Brian Murphy (1960s Gaelic footballer) =

Irish Gaelic footballer

Personal information
- Native name: Briain Ó Murchú (Irish)
- Born: Crosshaven, County Cork
- Height: 5 ft 10 in (178 cm)

Sport
- Sport: Gaelic football
- Position: Left corner-back
Club
- Years: Club
- 1960s-1970s: Crosshaven
Inter-county
Years	County	Apps (scores)
1965-1970	Cork	14 (0-00)
Inter-county titles
- Munster titles: 5
- All-Irelands: 1
- NFL: 0
- All Stars: 0

Brian Murphy (born 1943 in Crosshaven, County Cork) is an Irish former sportsperson. He played Gaelic football with his local clubs Crosshaven and St Finbarr's and was a member of the Cork senior inter-county team from 1965 until 1970.
