= 2011 Cork Intermediate Football Championship =

76th staging of the Cork Intermediate Football Championship

- Dates: 7 May – 9 October 2011
- Teams: 16
- Sponsor: Evening Echo
- Champions: Kinsale (1st title); Derry O'Callaghan (captain); Gearóid Condon (manager)
- Runners-up: Castletownbere; Lorcan Harrington (captain); Morgan O'Sullivan (manager)
- Relegated: Ballyclough

Tournament statistics
- Matches played: 29
- Goals scored: 54 (1.86 per match)
- Points scored: 567 (19.55 per match)
- Top scorer(s): Gearóid Finn (1-20)

The 2011 Cork Intermediate Football Championship was the 76th staging of the Cork Intermediate Football Championship since its establishment by the Cork County Board in 1909. The draw for the opening round fixtures took place on 11 December 2010. The championship ran from 7 May to 9 October 2011.

The final was played on 9 October 2011 at Páirc Uí Rinn in Cork, between Kinsale and Castletownbere, in what was their first ever meeting in the final. Kinsale won the match by 1–09 to 0–08 to claim their first ever championship title.

Kinsale's Geraóid Finn was the championship's top scorer with 1-20.

== Results ==
=== First round ===
7 May 2011 First round	Adrigole	1-09 - 0-08	Killavullen	Uíbh Laoire Grounds
	D Harrington 1-2, K Jer O'Sullivan 0-3, K Goggin 0-2, L Harrington 0-1, S O'Shea 0-1.		M Dineen 0-3, L Norris 0-3, K Murphy 0-1, A O'Driscoll 0-1.

8 May 2011 First round	Aghabullogue	0-08 - 0-13	Canovee	Éire Óg Grounds
	J Corkery 0-4, J Hogan 0-2, N BUckley 0-1, D Cullinane 0-1.		P Dunlea 0-7, S O'Connor 0-2, C Dunne 0-2, B Ahern 0-1, D Ahern 0-1.

8 May 2011 First round	Cill na Martra	0-07 - 2-06	Kildorrery	Páirc Eoin Mhic Charthaigh
	M Monaghan 1-1, D White 1-0, T Monaghan 0-2, E O'Connor 0-1, D Kelly 0-1, A O'Brien 0-1.		C Ó hUidhir 0-5, C Ó Súilleabháin 0-1, N Ó Laoire 0-1.

8 May 2011 First round	Éire Óg	4-14 - 3-05	Cloyne	Riverstown Sportsfield
	D Goulding 1-9, K HAllissey 2-2, J Dineen 1-3.		Diarmuid O'Sullivan 2-1, E O'Sullivan 1-0, Paul O'Sullivan 0-1, J Nyhan 0-1, Domhnall O'Sullivan 0-1, C O'Sullivan 0-1.

8 May 2011 First round	Glanmire	0-09 - 1-09	Ballydesmond	Mallow GAA Complex
	J Murphy 0-6, J O'Callaghan 0-1 T Leahy 0-1, K Kenneally 0-1.		S Kelly 1-0, D O'Connor 0-3, P Breen 0-2, B O'Callaghan 0-1, S Murphy 0-1, N Fleming 0-1, J Healy 0-1.

8 May 2011 First round	Kinsale	1-11 - 0-08	Ballyclough	Blarney Grounds
	B Coughlan 0-6, N Stanley 1-0, D O'Callaghan 0-2, R O'Sullivan 0-1, D Coughlan 0-1, J Gould 0-1.		T O'Shea 0-3, P O'Flynn 0-2, S Smith 0-2, D Ahern 0-1.

14 May 2011 First round	Youghal	1-11 - 1-10	Glanworth	Castlelyons Grounds
	C O'Sullivan 0-5, P Moylan 0-4, D O'Mahony 1-0, N Roche 0-1, K Dempsey 0-1.		P O'Driscoll 0-7, M Pierce 1-2, M Sheehan 0-1.

14 May 2011 First round	Castletownbere	0-11 - 0-09	Fermoy	Uíbh Laoire Grounds
	D MUrphy 0-4, A O'Regan 0-2, A O'Sullivan 0-2, C Murphy 0-1, T Collins 0-1, D O'Sullivan 0-1.		J Hutchings 0-2, J Campion 0-2, P Shanahan 0-2, I Brennan 0-2, R O'Hagan 0-1.

=== Second round ===
10 June 2011 Second round	Glanmire	0-11 - 0-05	Killavullen	Glenville Grounds
	J Murhy 0-8, D Molden 0-2, M Hopkins 0-1.		M Dineen 0-2, B O'Driscoll 0-1, D Dorgan 0-1, B Norris 0-1.

12 June 2011 Second round	Glanworth	2-12 - 3-13	Fermoy	Moore Park
	M Pierce 1-2, M Sheehan 0-3, S Finn 0-3, T Fitzgibbon 1-0, P O'Driscoll 0-2, D Pyne 0-1, C Quirke 0-1.		R O'Hagan 1-4, P Shanahan 1-1, J Campion 1-0, S McCarthy 0-2, T Clancy 0-2, E Clancy 0-1, J Hutchings 0-1, A O'Connor 0-1, R O'Callaghan 0-1.

19 June 2011 Second round	Aghabullogue	1-15 - 0-10	Ballyclough	Páirc Eoin Mhic Charthaigh
	J Corkery 0-8, P Finnegan 1-2, S Hogan 0-2, C Cullinane 0-1, N Buckley 0-1, S Kelleher 0-1.		P O'Flynn 0-3, M Heffernan 0-2, T O'Shea 0-1, S Smith 0-1, S Aherne 0-1, B Morrissey 0-1, W Kelly 0-1.

13 July 2011 Second round	Cloyne	1-12 - 0-14	Cill na Martra	Éire Óg Grounds
	P O'Sullivan 1-6, J Nyhan 0-2, J Cotter 0-1, Diarmuid O'Sullivan 0-1, P O'Sullivan 0-1, C O'Sullivan 0-1.		C Ó hUidhir 0-7, C Ó Súilleabháin 0-2, M Ó Conchúir 0-2, D Ó Conaill 0-1, S Ó Ceilleachair 0-1, M Ó Duinnín 0-1.

=== Third round ===
1 July 2011 Third round	Ballyclough	3-10 - 2-17	Glanworth	Mill Field
	G Deady 1-2, P O'Flynn 1-2, M Heffernan 0-3, B Gallagher 1-0, S Smith 0-2, T O'Shea 0-1.		M Sheehan 1-4, P O'Driscoll 0-5, T Fitzgibbon 1-1, D Pyne 0-2, C Quirke 0-2, B Gallagher 0-1, M Pierce 0-1, S Finn 0-1.

5 August 2011 Third round	Killavullen	0-10 - 2-13	Cill na Martra	Dromtarriffe Grounds
	A O'Driscoll 0-6, B O'Driscoll 0-2, D Dorgan 0-1, D Brosnan 0-1.		C Ó hUidhir 0-5, D Ó Conaill 1-1, C Ó Loingsigh 1-0, M Ó Conchúir 0-3, C Mac Suibhne 0-2, S Ó Céilleachair 0-1, C Ó Súilleabháin 0-1.

=== Relegation playoff ===
14 August 2011 Playoff	Ballyclough	0-14 - 0-19	Killavullen	Liam O'Connell Memorial Park
	T O'Neill 0-4, P O'Flynn 0-3, S Smith 0-2, M Heffernan 0-2, T O'Shea 0-1, B Morrissey 0-1, P Carroll 0-1.		D Dorgan 0-5, A O'Driscoll 0-3, P Egan 0-3, D Brosnan 0-2, C O'Connell 0-2, B Norris 0-2, R Dorgan 0-1, M Dineen 0-1.

=== Fourth round ===
30 July 2011 Fourth round	Glanmire	0-08 - 3-08	Youghal	Páirc Naomh Caitríonaigh
	J Murphy 0-5, D Molden 0-1, F O'Reilly 0-1, M Cussen 0-1.		P Moylan 2-3, N Roche 1-2, K Dempsey 0-1, J Grace 0-1, D O'Mahony 0-1.

30 July 2011 Fourth round	Kildorrery	2-11 - 1-10	Canovee	Páirc Eoin Mhic Charthaigh
	A O'Brien 1-6, T Monahan 1-0, E O'Connor 0-3, P O'Brien 0-1, D White 0-1.		P Dunlea 0-5, D Ring 0-3, C Dunne 1-0, E Lyons 0-1, D O'Sullivan 0-1.

13 August 2011 Fourth round	Cill na Martra	0-09 - 1-08	Kinsale	Éire Óg Grounds
	C Ó hUidhir 0-5, M Ó Conchúir 0-2, C Mac Suibhne 0-1, S Ó Ceilleachair 0-1.		G Finn 1-3, B Coughlan 0-3, D O'Callaghan 0-1, N McCarthy 0-1.

14 August 2011 Quarter-final	Castletownbere	1-11 - 0-08	Adrigole	Páirc Gairnis
	A O'Regan 1-1, A Harrington 0-3, Dean Murhy 0-2, T Collins 0-1, L Harrington 0-1, D Fenton 0-1, David Murphy 0-1, A O'Sullivan 0-1.		B Ger O'Sullivan 0-3, K Ger O'Sullivan 0-2, D Harrington 0-1, S O'Shea 0-1, K Goggin 0-1.

14 August 2011 Fourth round	Aghabullogue	1-08 - 1-05	Fermoy	Clyda Rovers Grounds
	P O'Rourke 1-1, P Finnegan 0-3, J Corkery 0-3, B Buckley 0-1.		I Brennan 1-0, J Hutchings 0-2, S Shanahan 0-1, S Carthy 0-1, J Campion 0-1.

14 August 2011 Fourth round	Éire Óg	1-10 - 1-08	Glanworth	Riverstown Sportsfield
	K Hallissey 0-6, J Crowley 1-0, J Dineen 0-2, A Herlihy 0-1, A O'Connor 0-1, T O'Leary 0-1.		T Fitzgibbon 1-2, M Pierce 0-2, C Quirke 0-2, S O'Keeffe 0-1, P O'Driscoll 0-1.

- Ballydesmond and Cloyne received byes in this round.

=== Quarter-finals ===
14 August 2011 Quarter-final	Cloyne	1-08 - 1-06	Ballydesmond	Mallow GAA Complex
	C O'Sullivan 1-0, P O'Sullivan 0-2, D O'Sullivan 0-2, B McCarthy 0-1, M Walsh 0-1, P O'Sullivan 0-1, K O'Lomasney 0-1.		S Kelly 1-1, D O'Connor 0-2, L Murphy 0-1, N Fleming 0-1, C O'Keeffe 0-1.

28 August 2011 Quarter-final	Aghabullogue	3-06 - 3-07	Castletownbere	Aughaville Grounds
	P Finnegan 2-2, P O'Rourke 1-0, J Hogan 0-2, J Kelleher 0-1, P Twomey 0-1.		A O'Regan 1-3, A O'Sullivan 1-1, D Murphy 1-1, L Harrington 0-1, D Nolan 0-1.

28 August 2011 Quarter-final	Youghal	0-11 - 1-08	Kinsale	Páirc Uí Rinn
	P Moylan 0-3, B Ring 0-3, J O'Mahony 0-2, J Ormonde 0-1, N Roche 0-1, C Spillane 0-1.		D O'Callaghan 1-1, G Finn 0-4, B Gray 0-1, B Coughlan 0-1, N Stanley 0-1.

9 September 2011 Quarter-final replay	Youghal	0-09 - 0-11	Kinsale	Páirc Uí Rinn
	P Moylan 0-4, K Dempsey 0-2, N Roche 0-2, J Ormonde 0-1.		B Coughlan 0-4, G Finn 0-3, D Murphy 0-1, R O'Sullivan 0-1, L Kiely 0-1, N McCarthy 0-1.

10 September 2011 Quarter-final	Kildorrery	0-13 - 1-08	Éire Óg	Páirc Uí Rinn
	D Kelly 0-5, A O'Brien 0-3, E O'Connor 0-1, D White 0-1, P O'Brien 0-1, T Monaghan 0-1, F Stapleton 0-1.		K Hallissey 1-3, J Dineen 0-3, D Goulding 0-1, D O'Connor 0-1.

=== Semi-finals ===
10 September 2011 Semi-final	Castletownbere	1-09 - 0-08	Cloyne	Sam Maguire Park
	A O'Sullivan 0-4, L Hanley 1-0, D Fenton 0-3, T Collins 0-1, Dean Murphy 0-1.		Paudie O'Sullivan 0-3, Paul O'Sullivan 0-2, D O'Sullivan 0-1, C O'Sullivan 0-1, J Nyhan 0-1.

17 September 2011 Semi-final	Kinsale	2-11 - 0-08	Kildorrery	Riverstown Sportsfield
	G Finn 0-6 (4fs, 1 45), B Coughlan 1-2, B Hannon 1-0 (og), M Coughlan, D O’Callaghan, L Kiely 0-1 each.	Report	T Monaghan 0-3, A O’Brien 0-2 (1 45), S Fitzgerald, P O’Brien, D White 0-1 each.

=== Final ===
9 October 2011 Final	Kinsale	1-09 - 0-08	Castletownbere	Páirc Uí Rinn
	G Finn 0-4, B Gray 1-0, B Coughlan 0-2, D Ward 0-2, N Stanley 0-1.		A O'Regan 0-3, Dean Murphy 0-2, D Fenton 0-2, T Collins 0-1.

== Championship statistics ==
=== Top scorers ===
Rank	Player	Club	Tally	Total	Matches	Average
1	Gearóid Finn	Kinsale	1-20	23	5	4.60
2	Caoimhín Ó hUidhir	Cill na Martra	0-22	22	4	5.50
3	Brendan Coughlan	Kinsale	1-18	21	6	3.50
4	Kevin Hallissey	Éire Óg	3-11	20	3	6.66
4	Paul Moylan	Youghal	2-14	20	4	5.00
6	James Murphy	Glanmire	0-19	19	3	6.33
7	Pa Finnegan	Aghabullogue	3-07	16	4	4.00
8	Alan O'Regan	Castletownbere	2-09	15	5	3.00
8	John Corkery	Aghabullogue	0-15	15	4	3.75
8	Pierre O'Driscoll	Glanworth	0-15	15	4	3.75
