= 1923 Cork Intermediate Football Championship =

Gaelic football competition

- Teams: 11
- Champions: Shamrocks (1st title); A. Brennan (captain)
- Runners-up: Dohenys; J. Bernard (captain)

The 1923 Cork Intermediate Football Championship was the 14th staging of the Cork Intermediate Football Championship since its establishment by the Cork County Board in 1909.

The final was played on 17 February 1924 at the Athletic Grounds in Bandon, between Shamrocks and Dohenys, in what was their first ever meeting in the final. Shamrocks won the match by 1–01 to 0–00 to claim their first ever championship title.

== Results ==
=== Final ===
| 17 February 1924 Final | Shamrocks | 1-01 - 0-00 | Dohenys | Bandon Grounds |
