= 1952 All-Ireland Senior Hurling Championship final =

1952 All-Ireland Senior Hurling Final
- Event: 1952 All-Ireland Senior Hurling Championship
Cork	Dublin
2–14	0–7
- Date: 7 September 1952
- Venue: Croke Park, Dublin
- Referee: W. O'Donoghue (Limerick)
- Attendance: 71,195

The 1952 All-Ireland Senior Hurling Championship Final was the 65th All-Ireland Final and the culmination of the 1952 All-Ireland Senior Hurling Championship, an inter-county hurling tournament for the top teams in Ireland. The match was held at Croke Park, Dublin, on 7 September 1952, between Cork and Dublin. The Leinster champions lost to their Munster opponents on a score line of 2–14 to 0–7.

== Match details ==
1952-09-07
15:15 IST
Final

Cork	2–14 – 0–7	Dublin

Croke Park, Dublin
Attendance: 64,332
Referee: W. O'Donoghue (Limerick)

Cork	Dublin

Cork Team 1 Dave Creedon 2 Jerry O'Riordan 3 John Lyons 4 Tony O'Shaughnessy 5 Matty Fuohy 6 Vincy Twomey 7 Sean O'Brien 8 Joe Twomey 9 Gerald Murphy 10 Willie Griffin 11 Willie John Daly 12 Christy Ring 13 Liam Abernethy 14 Liam Dowling 15 Paddy Barry Substitutes Jimmy Lynan for Liam Abernethy Mossy O'Riordan for Willie Griffin Unused Substitutes Mossie Finn, James O'Grady, Mossy O'Connor Trainer Jim Tough Barry Selectors Bertie Murphy, Paddy Fox Collins, Jack Barrett, Dinny Barry Murphy, Sean Og Murphy
