= Cork Under-21 Football Championship =

- Code: Gaelic football
- Region: Cork (GAA)
- No. of teams: 8 (county championship); 30–40 (overall)
- Title holders: Bishopstown gaa (2nd title)
- Sponsors: McCarthy Insurance Group
- Official website: Official website

The Cork Under-21 Football Championship is a Gaelic football competition in County Cork, Ireland for players under the age of 21. Clubs affiliated to Cork board compete to win this championship. All eight of the divisions in Cork organize their own championship. The divisional winners compete against each other to decide the county title.

== Teams ==
=== Cork Under-21 A Football Championship ===
Division	Championship	Qualifying teams
Avondhu	North Cork Under-21 A Football Championship	Champions
Beara	Divisional team	Beara
Carbery	Carbery Under-21 A Football Championship	Champions
Carrigdhoun	South East Under-21 A Football Championship	Champions
Duhallow	Duhallow Under-21 A Football Championship	Champions
Imokilly	East Cork Under-21 A Football Championship	Champions
Muskerry	Mid Cork Under-21 A Football Championship	Champions
Seandún	Cork City Under-21 A Football Championship	Champions

=== Cork Under-21 B Football Championship ===
Division	Championship	Qualifying teams
Avondhu	North Cork Under-21 B Football Championship	Champions
Carbery	Carbery Under-21 B Football Championship	Champions
Carrigdhoun	South East Under-21 B Football Championship	Champions
Duhallow	Duhallow Under-21 B Football Championship	Champions
Imokilly	East Cork Under-21 B Football Championship	Champions
Muskerry	Mid Cork Under-21 B Football Championship	Champions
Seandún	Cork City Under-21 B Football Championship	Champions

=== Cork Under-21 C Football Championship ===
Division	Championship	Qualifying teams
Avondhu	North Cork Under-21 C Football Championship	Champions
Carbery	Carbery Under-21 C Football Championship	Champions
Duhallow	Duhallow Under-21 C Football Championship	Champions
Imokilly	East Cork Under-21 C Football Championship	Champions
Muskerry	Mid Cork Under-21 C Football Championship	Champions

== Trophy ==
The winning team is presented with the Pádraig A. Ó Murchú Cup. This cup commemorates Patrick Aloyius "Weeshie" Murphy of Bere Island, who served the GAA for many years, both as a player and an administrator. He played at full back for Cork on the 1945 All-Ireland Senior Football Championship winning team, and also played club football for Beara and Lees.

== Under-21 A Football Championship ==
=== 2024 teams ===
33 clubs will compete in the 2024 Cork Under-21 A Football Championship:

Division	No.	Clubs competing in divisional championship
Avondhu	4	Buttevant, Clyda Rovers, Kilshannig, **Mallow**
Beara	1	**Beara**
Carbery	7	**Bantry Blues**, Castlehaven, Carbery Rangers, Clonakilty, Dohenys, Ibane Gaels, Newcestown
Carrigdhoun	5	Ballygarvan, Ballymartle, Carrigaline, Kinsale, **Valley Rovers**
Duhallow	5	BK Plunketts, Croke Rovers, Dromtarriffe—Kanturk, **Duarigle Gaels**, Robert Emmets
Imokilly	2	**Aghada**, Glenville
Muskerry	4	Ballincollig, **Ballinora**, Éire Óg, Naomh Abán
Seandún	5	**Bishopstown**, Douglas, Nemo Rangers, St Finbarr’s, St Michael’s

Note: Bold indicates title-holders.

=== List of finals ===
Year	Winners		Runners-up	
Year	Club	Score	Club	Score
2024	Bishopstown	1-11	Beara	0-06
2020–2023	No championship			
2019	St Michael's	2-12	Ballincollig	1-11
2018	Nemo Rangers	0-12, 1-13 (R)	Kilmurry	1-09, 0-08 (R)
2017	Douglas	2-11	Cill Na Martra	2-06
2016	St. Finbarr's	1-12	Ilen Rovers	0-07
2015	Valley Rovers	3-07	Nemo Rangers	0-07
2014	Nemo Rangers	3-09, 1-12 (R)	Ballincollig	3-09, 1-04 (R)
2013	Valley Rovers	2-06	Clonakilty	1-06
2012	Nemo Rangers	2–13	Bantry Blues	0-05
2011	O'Donovan Rossa	1-09, 0–14 (R)	Carrigaline	1-09, 1-08 (R)
2010	Castlehaven	2–13	Ballincollig	1-03
2009	Ballincollig	0–11	St. Finbarr's	0-09
2008	St. Finbarr's	1–14	Newmarket	1-08
2007	Castlehaven	0–13	Macroom	1-09
2006	Beara	1–13	Macroom	1-09
2005	Nemo Rangers	2–11	Valley Rovers	2-06
2004	Nemo Rangers	2–10	O'Donovan Rossa	1-06
2003	St. Nicholas	1–11*	Erin's Own	2-04
2002	Nemo Rangers	5–10	Erin's Own	1–10
2001	Nemo Rangers	3–23	Inniscarra	2-04
2000	Mallow	1-09	Dohenys	0-08
1999	Beara	1–11	Clonakilty	1-08
1998	Castlehaven	1–12	Charleville	1-06
1997	Beara	1–12	Bishopstown	2-08
1996	Beara	1–10*	Ballincollig	0-09
1995	Mallow	2-09	Naomh Abán	0–12
1994	Bantry Blues	1–13*	Mallow	1-05
1993	Bantry Blues	0–11	Mallow	0-04
1992	Bishopstown	2–11	Bantry Blues	0-07
1991	Nemo Rangers	0-08	Beara	0-07
1990	O'Donovan Rossa	0–10	Beara	0-08
1989	Nemo Rangers		Macroom	
1988	Nemo Rangers	1-09	Macroom	3-01
1987	O'Donovan Rossa	1-08	Bishopstown	0-08
1986	St. Finbarr's		Mallow	
1985	St. Finbarr's	0–15	Valley Rovers	2-04
1984	O'Donovan Rossa	1-05	St. Finbarr's	0-07
1983	Castlehaven	2-04	St. Finbarr's	0-05
1982	Macroom	1–10	St. Finbarr's	1-07
1981	Castlehaven	1-08	Na Piarsaigh	0-03
1980	Nemo Rangers	3–16	Beara	1-04
1979	Nemo Rangers	3–12	Beara	0-02
1978	St. Finbarr's	2-08	Knocknagree	2-04
1977	St. Finbarr's	2-09	Beara	3-03
1976	St Michael's	6–15	Ballydesmond	0-03
1975	Nemo Rangers	4-08	Beara	0–10
1974	Nemo Rangers	1–10	Glanmire	2-05
1973	St. Finbarr's	4-06	Bandon	2-06

=== Notes ===
- The following finals were drawn: 1994, 1996, 2003, 2011

== Under-21 B Football Championship ==
=== History ===
This competition is confined to clubs who compete at the B level in each of the regional divisions in County Cork. The winning team is presented with the Seán Ó Crualaoí Cup. Presented in 2010 by the Crowley family in memory of the late Seán Crowley of Bandon, who was a Vice-President of the County Board up until his death in 2009. Bandon was the sporting love of his life, followed by love for his division Carbery, Cork and Munster in that order. He was Bandon's representative on the Carbery Board and also spent many years as Bandon's and Carbery's representative on the Cork County Board. He served as Chairman of the Carbery Board for a number of years and was also a selector for many years on Carbery Hurling and Football teams. He also acted as selector on the Cork Football All Ireland winning team of 1973 and on the successful Munster Railway Cup team of 1972, both successes which came after many years in the doldrums for both teams.

=== 2024 teams ===
00000 clubs will compete in the 2024 Cork Under-21 B Football Championship:

Division	No.	Clubs competing in divisional championship
Avondhu		
Carbery	7	Ahan Gaels, Bandon, Gabriels/Goleen, Kililen, O'Donovan Rossa, St Colum's, Tadhg McCarthaigh's
Carrigdhoun		
Duhallow	2	**Sliabh Luachra Gaels**, St Peter’s
Imokilly	8	Carrigtwohill, Castlemartyr, Cobh, Erins Own, Fr O Neills, Midleton, St. Colmcilles, Youghal
Muskerry		
Seandún		

Note: Bold indicates title-holders.

=== Roll of honour ===
#	Club	Titles	Championships won
1	Erin's Own	1	2010
1	Glenbower Rovers	1	2011
1	Iveleary	1	2012
1	Canovee	1	2013
1	St. Finbarr's	1	2014
1	Cill na Martra	1	2015
1	Ibane Gaels	1	2016
1	Kilshannig	1	2017
1	Charleville	1	2018
1	Newcestown	1	2019

=== List of finals ===
Year	Winners		Runners-up	
Year	Club	Score	Club	Score
2024	Kilmurry	0-15	St. Nicholas	1-02
2020–2023	No championship			
2019	Newcestown	0-14 (14)	Aghabullogue	0-11 (11)
2018	Charleville	3-11 (20)	Duarigle Gaels*	1-03 (6)
2017	Kilshannig	3-11 (20)	Robert Emmets*	1-11 (14)
2016	Ibane Gaels*	2-12 (18)	Clyda Rovers	2-05 (11)
2015	Cill na Martra	2-11 (17)	Kilmeen	1-13 (16)
2014	St. Finbarr's	2-07 (13)	Ballinascarthy	0-04 (4)
2013	Canovee	3–12 (21)	Robert Emmets*	2–11 (17)
2012	Iveleary	1–14 (17)	Kildorrery	1-07 (10)
2011	Glenbower Rovers	1–14 (17)	Cill na Martra	0–16 (16)
2010	Erin's Own	1-08 (11)	Passage West	0-09 (9)

==== Notes ====
- Duarigle Gaels: Cullen and Millstreet
- Ibane Gaels: Arigdeen Rangers and Barryroe
- Robert Emmets: Lismire and Newmarket

== Under-21 C Football Championship ==
=== 2024 teams ===
26 clubs will compete in the 2024 Cork Under-21 C Football Championship:

Division	No.	Clubs competing in divisional championship
Avondhu	4	Ballycastle Gaels, Doneraile, **Kildorrery**, St Kevin’s
Carbery	6	Clann na nGael, Kilbrittain, **Kilmeen**, Muintir Bhaire, Randal Óg, St James’s
Duhallow	2	Duarigle Gaels, **Lyre**
Imokilly	6	Castlelyons, Dungourney, Glanmire, **Glenbower Rovers**, Lisgoold, St Catherine’s
Muskerry	8	Aghinagh, Béal Átha'n Ghaorthaidh, Blarney, Cill na Martra, Clondrohid, Iveleary, **Kilmichael**, Macroom

Note: Bold indicates title-holders.

=== Roll of honour ===
Club	Titles	Championships won
Dromtarriffe	1	2017
Donoughmore	1	2018
Aghinagh	1	2019
Kilmichael	1	2024

=== List of finals ===
Year	Winners		Runners-up	
Year	Club	Score	Club	Score
2024	Kilmichael	2—12	Glenbower Rovers	3—05
2020–2023	No championship			
2019	Aghinagh	4–08	Robert Emmets*	2–07
2018	Donoughmore	2–13	Tadhg McCarthaigh's	2–12
2017	Dromtarriffe	1–14	St. Kevin's*	2–08

==== Notes ====
- Robert Emmets: Lismire and Newmarket
- St. Kevin's: Ballyclough and Milford
- Glenbower Rovers: Killeagh and St Ita’s

== See also ==
- Cork Under-21 Hurling Championship

== Sources ==
- Cork GAA – A History 1886–1986 Jim Cronin
- Cork Under-21 Football Final Results
