= 1904 Cork Junior Hurling Championship =

Irish hurling competition

- Champions: Shamrocks (1st title)
- Runners-up: Shanballymore

The 1904 Cork Junior Hurling Championship was the 10th staging of the Cork Junior Hurling Championship since its establishment by the Cork County Board in 1895.

The final was played on 17 December 1905 at the Athletic Grounds in Cork, between Shamrocks and Shanballymore, in what was their first ever meeting in the final. Shamrocks won the match by 3-08 to 3-03 to claim their first ever championship title.

== Results ==
=== Final ===
| 17 December 1905 Final | Shamrocks | 3-08 - 3-03 | Shanballymore | Cork Athletic Grounds |
