= 1959 All-Ireland Junior Hurling Championship =

1959 inter-county junior hurling championship

All Ireland Champions
- Winners: London (3rd win)

All Ireland Runners-up
- Runners-up: Antrim

Provincial Champions
- Munster: Cork
- Leinster: Wexford
- Ulster: Antrim
- Connacht: Roscommon

The 1959 All-Ireland Junior Hurling Championship was the 38th staging of the All-Ireland Junior Championship since its establishment by the Gaelic Athletic Association in 1912.

Cork entered the championship as the defending champions, however, they were beaten by Antrim in the All-Ireland home final.

The All-Ireland final was played on 4 October 1959 at Croke Park in Dublin, between London and Antrim, in what was their first ever meeting in the final. London won the match by 5–10 to 2–10 to claim their third championship title overall and a first title in 10 years.

== Results ==
=== All-Ireland Junior Hurling Championship ===
==== All-Ireland semi-finals ====
16 August 1958 Semi-final	Antrim	2-10 - 2-06	Wexford	Casement Park

23 August 1959 Semi-final	Roscommom	4-05 - 6-14	Cork	Dr. Hyde Park

==== All-Ireland home final ====
20 September 1959 Home final	Antrim	3-04 - 2-03	Cork	Croke Park

==== All-Ireland final ====
4 October 1959 Final	London	5-10 - 2-10	Antrim	Croke Park
