= 1952–53 National Hurling League =

22nd season of the National Hurling League

League details
- Dates: 26 October 1952 – 19 April 1953

League champions
- Winners: Cork (6th win)
- Captain: David O'Leary

The 1952–53 National Hurling League was the 22nd season of the National Hurling League.

== Division 1 ==
National Hurling League Division 1
- Season: 1952-53
- Champions: Cork; 6th National League title Captain: David O'Leary
- All statistics correct as of 19 March 2017.

Tipperary came into the season as defending champions of the 1951-52 season.

On 19 April 1953, Cork won the title after a 2-10 to 2-7 win over Tipperary in the final. It was their 6th league title overall and their first since 1947-48.

=== Group A table ===
Pos	Team	Pld	W	D	L	Pts	Notes
1	Cork	6	6	0	0	12	National League champions
2	Dublin	6	4	0	2	8	
3	Wexford	6	4	0	2	8	
4	Waterford	6	3	0	3	6	
5	Antrim	6	2	0	4	4	
6	Kilkenny	6	2	0	4	4	
7	Laois	6	0	0	6	0	

=== Group B table ===
Pos	Team	Pld	W	D	L	Pts	Notes
1	Tipperary	6	6	0	0	12	National League runners-up
2	Clare	6	4	1	1	9	
3	Galway	5	3	1	1	7	
4	Limerick	4	2	0	2	4	
5	Westmeath	5	2	0	3	4	
6	Offaly	6	1	0	5	2	
7	Meath	6	0	0	6	0	

=== Knock-out stage ===
Semi-finals

8 March 1953 Semi-final	Dublin	3-06 - 3-11	Cork	Croke Park, Dublin
	G Kelly 1-2, T Herbert 1-0, T Ryan 1-0, C Murphy 0-2, W Conway 0-2.		P Barry 2-2, C Ring 1-5, J Hartnett 0-2, M Fouhy 0-2.	Referee: J Mulcahy (Kilkenny)

8 March 1953 Semi-final	Clare	3-07 - 4-06	Tipperary	Ennis Sportsfield, Ennis
	J Smyth 1-4, P Halpin 1-1, J Purcell 1-0, D Carroll 0-2.		P Kenny 2-1, P Maher 1-1, S Bannon 1-0, P Shanahan 0-3, M Ryan 0-1.	Referee: J Conroy (Laois)

Final

19 April 1953 Final	Cork	2-10 - 2-07	Tipperary	Croke Park, Dublin
	P Barry 1-0, C Ring 0-4, J Lynam 1-0, J Hartnett 0-3, WJ Daly 0-2, G Murphy 0-1.		P Kenny 2-0, P Shanahan 0-3, T Ryan 0-2, M Ryan 0-1, T Wall 0-1.	Attendance: 38,912
