= Crosshaven GAA =

Gaelic sports club in County Cork, Ireland

- CLG Bun an Tábhairne
- Founded: 1884
- County: Cork
- Colours: Black and Red

Playing kits
Standard colours

Crosshaven GAA is a Gaelic Athletic Association club based in Crosshaven, County Cork, Ireland. The club fields Gaelic Football and hurling teams in competitions organized by Carrigdhoun division of Cork GAA.

== History ==
Crosshaven GAA Club was founded in 1884 and is based in Camden.

== Achievements ==
- Cork Junior Football Championship Runners-Up 1964
- Carrigdhoun Junior Football Championship Winners (9) 1929, 1941, 1942, 1952, 1962, 1963, 1964, 1966, 1998 Runners-Up 1930, 1931, 1935, 1955, 1956, 1959, 1961
- Carrigdhoun Junior Hurling Championship Winners (1) 1969 Runners-Up 1966, 1967 (Lost on objection after winning the game)
- South-East Under 21 "A" Football Championship Winners (1) 1975
- South-East Under 21 "C" Football Championship Winners (1) 2019

== Notable players ==
- Brian Murphy - played with Cork Senior Footballers 1967-1970
- Tom Bermingham
