= Rochestown GAA =

Gaelic Athletic Association club

Rochestown
- Baile an Róistigh
- Founded: 1923
- County: Cork
- Nickname: Roco
- Colours: Black and amber
- Grounds: St Francis College

Playing kits
Standard colours

Rochestown GAA is a Junior B Gaelic Athletic Association club located in Rochestown, County Cork, Ireland. The club, part of the Seandún division, fields teams in both hurling and Gaelic football.

== History ==
Located in Rochestown, County Cork, Rochestown GAA Club, then known as Crusaders, was founded in 1923.The club uses the nearby St Francis College pitch as its home ground. The club, one of the smallest in Cork, had just 25 registered players and a committee of ten when they won the Junior C League title in 2017.

== Honours ==
- South East Junior A Hurling Championship (1): 1932
- City Junior B Hurling Championship (1): 1970
- Seandún Junior C Football League (1): 2017
- Flor McCarthy Football Cup (2): 2021, 2024
- Seandún Junior C Football Championship (2) 2006, 2026

== Notable players ==
- Jim Foley: international footballer (1934–1936)
- Justin McCarthy: All-Ireland SHC-winner (1966)
