= 1960 Cork Junior Hurling Championship =

Irish hurling competition

- Teams: 7
- Champions: Castletownroche (1st title)
- Runners-up: Cloyne

The 1960 Cork Junior Hurling Championship was the 63rd staging of the Cork Junior Hurling Championship since its establishment by the Cork County Board in 1895.

The final was played on 13 November 1960 at the Athletic Grounds in Cork, between Castletownroche and Cloyne, in what was their first ever meeting in the final. Castletownroche won the match by 3-06 to 4-02 to claim their first ever championship title.

== Results ==
=== Final ===
13 November 1960 Final	Castletownroche	3-06 - 4-02	Cloyne	Cork Athletic Grounds
