= Tracton GAA =

Gaelic games club in County Cork, Ireland

- Trácht Fhionn
- Founded: 1888
- County: Cork
- Colours
- Grounds: Tracton GAA Grounds

Playing kits
Standard colours

Tracton GAA Club is a Gaelic Athletic Association club in Minane Bridge, County Cork, Ireland. The club is affiliated to the Carrigdhoun Board and fields teams in both hurling and Gaelic football.

== History ==
Located in the village of Minane Bridge, about 5 km from Carrigaline, Tracton GAA Club was established in 1888. The club entered a team in the 1888 Cork SHC and, playing in the South Cork division, were beaten by Carrigaline in the opening round. Tracton has, since then, spent the majority of its existence operating in the junior grades.

Tracton won the first of seven South East JAHC titles in 1929. The club made a major breakthrough in 1957 by winning the Cork JHC title for the first time. A second Cork JHC title was won in 1979 after a defeat of Castletownroche in the final. Tracton secured senior status for the first time in their history in 1991, when they beat Inniscarra by 4–15 to 5–09 to win the Cork IHC title.

While Tracton has been dominated by hurling since its foundation, the club has also won three South East JAFC titles since 1983.

== Honours ==
- Cork Intermediate Hurling Championship (1): 1991
- Cork Junior A Hurling Championship (3): 1957, 1979, 2024
- South East Junior A Football Championship (3): 1983, 2007, 2010
- South East Junior A Hurling Championship (7): 1929, 1942, 1950, 1957, 1979, 1987, 2024
- South East Under 21 "A" Hurling Championship (4): 1968, 1969, 1978, 1984
- South East Under 21 "B" Hurling Championship (5): 2012, 2013, 2014, 2016, 2017
- Cork Minor Hurling Championship (1): 1930
- Cork Minor C Hurling Championship (1): 2012

== Notable players ==
- Terry Kelly: Munster SHC–winner (1953, 1956)
- Kieran Kingston: All-Ireland SHC–winner (1986)
- Tom Kingston: All-Ireland SHC–winner (1990)
