= Shamrocks GAA (Cork) =

Gaelic games club in County Cork, Ireland

Shamrocks
- Na Seamróga
- Founded: 1898
- County: Cork
- Colours
- Grounds: Ted Hanley Memorial Park

Playing kits
Standard colours

Shamrocks Hurling & Football Club is a Gaelic Athletic Association club in Monkstown, County Cork, Ireland. The club is affiliated to the Carrigdhoun Board and fields teams in both hurling and Gaelic football.

== History ==
Located in the parish of Monkstown, about 5km from Carrigaline, Shamrocks Hurling & Football Club was established by John Murphy, Michael Henry Murphy and John Francis McSweeney in 1898. The club draws its players from the villages of Monkstown, Shanbally, Ringaskiddy and surrounding areas. The club has spent the majority of its existence operating in the junior grade.

Shamrocks had its first success when, in 1904, it claimed the Cork JHC title after beating Shanballymore by 3–08 to 3–03 in the final. The newly-created Cork IHC saw Shamrocks contest three finals with success between 1909 and 1914, however, the club finally won the title in 1915 after beating Castletownroche in the final. Shamrocks immediately made an impact in the top grade, however, they were beaten by Midleton in the 1916 Cork SHC final. The club ended a 20-year era of success by winning the Cork IFC title in 1923.

The advent of the divisional championships at junior level resulted in Shamrocks having successes in both codes. The club has won five south East JAHC titles, with their most recent victory coming in 2005. Shamrocks has also claimed 13 South East JAFC titles, as well as a junior double in 1980.

== Honour ==
- Cork Intermediate Football Championship (1): 1923
- Cork Intermediate Hurling Championship (1): 1915
- Cork Junior Hurling Championship (1): 1904
- South East Junior A Hurling Championship (5): 1959, 1963, 1980, 1981, 2005
- South East Junior A Football Championship (13): 1931, 1933, 1934, 1971, 1972, 1975, 1977, 1980, 1982, 1988, 1989, 1994, 2016
- South-East Under 21 "A" Hurling Championship (1): 1973
- South-East Under 21 "A" Football Championship (3): 1967, 1980, 2004
- South-East Under 21 "B" Hurling Championship (2): 1992, 2003
- South-East Under 21 "B" Football Championship (3): 1999, 2002, 2017
- South-East Junior "B" Football Championship (3): 1976, 1980, 1994
- South-East Minor "A" Hurling Championship (7): 1937, 1939, 1944, 1967, 1968, 1973, 1974
- South-East Minor "A" Football Championship (6): 1939, 1943, 1944, 1967, 1968, 1976
- South-East Minor "B" Hurling Championship (3): 1992, 1993, 2002
- South-East Minor "B" Football Championship (6): 1973, 1992, 1993, 1995, 1997, 2010
- Cork Minor "A" Football Championship (1): 2025
- Cork Minor C Hurling Championship (1): 2014
- Mid Cork Minor "A" Football Championship (2): 2024, 2025

== Notable players ==
- Frank Kelleher: All-Ireland SHC–winner (1919)
- Michael Prout: Munster SFC–winner (2006)

== External sources ==
- Shamrocks GAA website
