= Kinsale GAA =

Gaelic games club in County Cork, Ireland

Kinsale
- Cionn tSáile
- Founded: 1886
- County: Cork
- Colours
- Grounds: Jack Barrett Memorial Park

Playing kits
Standard colours

Senior Club Championships
	All Ireland	Munster champions	Cork champions
Football:	0	0	0
Hurling:	0	0	0

Kinsale GAA is a Gaelic Athletic Association club in Kinsale, County Cork, Ireland. The club is affiliated to the Carrigdhoun Board and the Cork County Board and fields teams in both hurling and Gaelic football.

== History ==
Located in the town of Kinsale, about 26 km south of Cork, Kinsale GAA Club was founded in 1886. The club was active in Gaelic football in its early years but lost Cork SFC finals to Nils in 1894, under the banner of Kinsale Blacks & Whites, and to Fermoy in 1900. In spite of the latter defeat, Kinsale claimed the Cork JFC title in 1900, after a defeat of Macroom in the final.

Kinsale had its first major hurling success in 1918, when the club won the Cork JHC after a 4–01 to 2–01 win over Doneraile. This was followed by a Cork IHC title in 1926, with Kinsale securing senior status for the first time after the 5–02 to 2–04 win over Buttevant.

Kinsale spent the majority of the 20th century operating in the junior divisional grades following the establishment of the Carrigdhoun Division in 1926. The club has since won a record 18 South East JAFC titles, as well as six South East JAHC titles. Kinsale bridged a 79-year without a county title after beating Castletownbere by 1–09 to 0–08 to win the Cork IFC in October 2011.

== Honours ==
- Cork Intermediate Football Championship (1): 2011
- Cork Intermediate Hurling Championship (1): 1926
- Cork Junior A Football Championship (2): 1900, 1932
- Cork Junior A Hurling Championship (2): 1918, 1933
- Carrigdhoun Junior A Football Championship (18): 1930, 1932, 1945, 1946, 1948, 1949, 1953, 1958, 1960, 1961, 1965, 1973, 1974, 1976, 1978, 1999, 2001, 2005, 2022
- Carrigdhoun Junior A Hurling Championship (6): 1930, 1933, 1978, 1984, 1989, 2007, 2020

== Notable players ==
- Jack Barrett: All-Ireland SHC-winner (1941)
- Jim O'Regan: All-Ireland SHC-winner (1926, 1928, 1929, 1931)
