= South East Junior A Hurling Championship =

Gaelic sports competition

- Code: Hurling
- Founded: 1928; 98 years ago
- No. of teams: 9
- Title holders: Valley Rovers (11th title)
- First winner: Ballinhassig (1928)
- Most titles: Ballinhassig (29 titles)

The South East Cork Junior A Hurling Championship is an annual hurling competition organised by the Carrigdhoun Board of the Gaelic Athletic Association since 1928 for junior hurling teams in the southeastern region of County Cork, Ireland.

The series of games begin in July, with the championship culminating with the final in the autumn. The championship includes a group stage and a knockout stage which guarantees each team at least 2 championship games.

The South East Junior A Championship is an integral part of the wider Cork Junior A Hurling Championship. The winners and of the South East championship join their counterparts from the other six divisions to contest the county championship.

Valley Rovers are the title-holders, defeating Kinsale by 0–18 to 1–12 in the 2026 final.

== Format ==
=== Group stage ===
The 10 teams are divided into three groups of four. Over the course of the group stage, each team plays once against the others in the group, resulting in each team being guaranteed at least two games. Two points are awarded for a win, one for a draw and zero for a loss. The teams are ranked in the group stage table by points gained, then scoring difference and then their head-to-head record. The top two teams in each group qualify for the knockout stage.

=== Knockout stage ===
Quarter-finals: Two lone quarter-finals featuring the four lowest-placed qualifying teams from the group stage. Two teams qualify for the next round.

Semi-finals: The two quarter-final winners and the top two highest-placed qualifying teams from the group stage contest this round. The two winners from these games advance to the final.

Final: The two semi-final winners contest the final. The winning team are declared champions.

== Teams ==
=== 2026 teams ===
The 9 teams competing in the 2026 South East Junior A Hurling Championship are:

Club	Location	Colours	Position in 2026	In Championship since	Championship Titles	Last Championship Title
Ballinhassig	Ballinhassig	Blue and white	Group stage	1929	29	2014
Ballygarvan	Ballygarvan	Red and white	Group stage	2020	2	2004
Ballymartle	Riverstick	Green and gold	Semi-finals	2021	16	2021
Belgooly	Belgooly	White and blue	Semi-finals	2022	2	2025
Carrigaline	Carrigaline	Blue and yellow	Quarter-finals	2018	10	2003
Courcey Rovers	Ballinspittle	Red and white	Group stage	1976	6	2019
Kinsale	Kinsale	Blue and white	Runners-up	1929	7	2020
Shamrocks	Shanbally	Green and white	Quarter-finals	1972	5	2005
Valley Rovers	Innishannon	Green and white	Champions	1929	11	2026

== Roll of honour ==
=== By club ===
#	Club	Titles	Runners-up	Championships won	Championships runners-up
1	Ballinhassig	29	12	1928, 1946, 1948, 1953, 1954, 1955, 1956, 1960, 1961, 1962, 1964, 1965, 1970, 1971, 1973, 1991, 1992, 1994, 1995, 1996, 1998, 2000, 2002, 2006, 2009, 2011, 2012, 2013, 2014	1947, 1951, 1952, 1959, 1963, 1993, 1999, 2001, 2003, 2004, 2008, 2015
2	Ballymartle	16	13	1936, 1939, 1940, 1943, 1951, 1952, 1958, 1972, 1975, 1976, 1985, 1986, 2008, 2010, 2015, 2021	1926, 1942, 1970, 1971, 1973, 1980, 1983, 1984, 2006, 2007, 2013, 2014, 2022
3	Valley Rovers	11	12	1937, 1941, 1949, 1966, 1967, 1968, 1988, 2016, 2017, 2022, 2026	1936, 1946, 1957, 1960, 1961, 1965, 1969, 1997, 2018, 2021, 2023, 2024
4	Carrigaline	10	8	1926, 1935, 1938, 1944, 1947, 1974, 1982, 1983, 1990, 2003	1937, 1945, 1981, 1985, 1989, 1991, 2002, 2011
5	Tracton	7	18	1929, 1942, 1950, 1957, 1979, 1987, 2024	1930, 1932, 1939, 1940, 1941, 1943, 1944, 1948, 1953, 1968, 1972, 1974, 1975, 1977, 1978, 2009, 2017, 2019
5	Kinsale	7	9	1930, 1933, 1978, 1984, 1989, 2007, 2020	1931, 1938, 1982, 1987, 1990, 2005, 2012, 2025, 2026
7	Courcey Rovers	6	9	1993, 1997, 1999, 2001, 2018, 2019	1976, 1988, 1992, 1995, 1996, 1998, 2000, 2010, 2016
8	Shamrocks	5	10	1959, 1963, 1980, 1981, 2005	1934, 1935, 1954, 1955, 1956, 1958, 1962, 1964, 1979, 2020
9	Passage West	3	0	1931, 1934, 1945	—
10	Ballygarvan	2	4	1977, 2004	1929, 1949, 1986, 1994
10	Belgooly	2	0	2023, 2025	—
12	Crosshaven	1	2	1969	1966, 1967
12	Rochestown	1	1	1932	1933

== List of finals ==
Year	Winners		Runners-up		Venue
Year	Club	Score	Club	Score	Venue
2026	Valley Rovers	0–18	Kinsale	1–12	Shanbally
2025	Belgooly	1–24	Kinsale	1–17	Carrigaline
2024	Tracton	1–20	Valley Rovers	3–09	Ballinspittle
2023	Belgooly	5–17	Valley Rovers	2–14	Minane Bridge
2022	Valley Rovers	0–16	Ballymartle	0–14	Minane Bridge
2021	Ballymartle	0–21	Valley Rovers	2–14	Ballinhassig
2020	Kinsale	1–22	Shamrocks	4–12	Ballygarvan
2019	Courcey Rovers	3–16	Tracton	1–18	Shanbally
2018	Courcey Rovers	0–14	Valley Rovers	0–13	Belgooly
2017	Valley Rovers	0–14	Tracton	1–08	Ballygarvan
2016	Valley Rovers	3–11	Courcey Rovers	2–07	Kinsale
2015	Ballymartle	2–13	Ballinhassig	0–09	Carrigaline
2014	Ballinhassig	1–16	Ballymartle	1–11	Minane Bridge
2013	Ballinhassig	2–12	Ballymartle	1–14	Kinsale
2012	Ballinhassig	1–15	Kinsale	0–10	Carrigaline
2011	Ballinhassig	1–15	Carrigaline	0–10	Riverstick
2010	Ballymartle	2–15	Courcey Rovers	0–09	Ballinhassig
2009	Ballinhassig	4–12	Tracton	4–06	Ballygarvan
2008	Ballymartle	2–13	Ballinhassig	0–09	Belgooly
2007	Kinsale	1–08	Ballymartle	0–08	Carrigaline
2006	Ballinhassig	1–16	Ballymartle	0–06	Ballygarvan
2005	Shamrocks	1–09	Kinsale	1–07	Innishannon
2004	Ballygarvan	2–12	Ballinhassig	1–11	Shanbally
2003	Carrigaline	2–15	Ballinhassig	2–06	Minane Bridge
2002	Ballinhassig	2–07	Carrigaline	0–08	Ballinspittle
2001	Courcey Rovers	1–12	Ballinhassig	0–08	Kinsale
2000	Ballinhassig	1–10	Courcey Rovers	1–09	Crosshaven
1999	Courcey Rovers	4-10	Ballinhassig	2-12	Carrigaline
1998	Ballinhassig	0-16	Courcey Rovers	2-06	Riverstick
1997	Courcey Rovers	0-14	Valley Rovers	1-07	Ballinhassig
1996	Ballinhassig	2-13	Courcey Rovers	2-10	Ballygarvan
1995	Ballinhassig	0-15	Courcey Rovers	0-04	Innishannon
1994	Ballinhassig	1-15	Ballygarvan	2-08	Shanbally
1993	Courcey Rovers	3-10	Ballinhassig	1-14	Minane Bridge
1992	Ballinhassig	0-15	Courcey Rovers	1-10	Carrigaline
1991	Ballinhassig	1-11	Carrigaline	1-09	Kinsale
1990	Carrigaline	3-13	Kinsale	2-09	Crosshaven
1989	Kinsale	2-12	Carrigaline	1-13	Ballygarvan
1988	Valley Rovers	4-06	Courcey Rovers	2-09	Riverstick
1987	Tracton	4-09	Kinsale	0-10	Ballinhassig
1986	Ballymartle	1-12	Ballygarvan	0-06	Innishannon
1985	Ballymartle	2-11	Carrigaline	1-09	Ballinspittle
1984	Kinsale	3-04	Ballymartle	0-10	Shanbally
1983	Carrigaline	2-07 (D), 1-13 (R)	Ballymartle	1-10 (D), 0-10 (R)	Carrigaline
1982	Carrigaline	3-11	Kinsale	1-02	
1981	Shamrocks	2-13	Carrigaline	2-08	
1980	Shamrocks	1-12	Ballymartle	1-11	
1979	Tracton	3-06 (D), 2-13 (1R), 0-11 (2R)	Shamrocks	1-12 (D), 2-13 (1R), 1-05 (2R)	
1978	Kinsale	3-10	Tracton	2-08	
1977	Ballygarvan	1-12	Tracton	1-10	
1976	Ballymartle	2-16	Courcey Rovers	0-11	
1975	Ballymartle	3-07	Tracton	2-04	
1974	Carrigaline	3-10	Tracton	2-06	
1973	Ballinhassig	4-10	Ballymartle	0-10	
1972	Ballymartle	5-08	Tracton	2-07	
1971	Ballinhassig	5-05 (D), 4-06 (R)	Ballymartle	4-08 (D), 2-08 (R)	
1970	Ballinhassig	3–12	Ballymartle	3–03	
1969	Crosshaven	4–06	Valley Rovers	2–08	Riverstick
1968	Valley Rovers	4–09	Tracton	5–05	Carrigaline
1967	Valley Rovers		Crosshaven		
1966	Valley Rovers		Crosshaven		
1965	Ballinhassig		Valley Rovers		
1964	Ballinhassig		Shamrocks		
1963	Shamrocks		Ballinhassig		
1962	Ballinhassig		Shamrocks		
1961	Ballinhassig		Valley Rovers		
1960	Ballinhassig		Valley Rovers		
1959	Shamrocks		Ballinhassig		
1958	Ballymartle		Shamrocks		
1957	Tracton		Valley Rovers		
1956	Ballinhassig		Shamrocks		
1955	Ballinhassig		Shamrocks		
1954	Ballinhassig		Shamrocks		
1953	Ballinhassig		Tracton		
1952	Ballymartle		Ballinhassig		
1951	Ballymartle		Ballinhassig		
1950	Tracton				
1949	Valley Rovers		Ballygarvan		
1948	Ballinhassig		Tracton		
1947	Carrigaline		Ballinhassig		
1946	Ballinhassig		Valley Rovers		
1945	Passage		Carrigaline		
1944	Carrigaline		Tracton		
1943	Ballymartle		Tracton		
1942	Tracton		Ballymartle		
1941	Valley Rovers		Tracton		
1940	Ballymartle	4–03	Tracton	2–05	Carrigaline
1939	Ballymartle	5–06	Tracton	3–02	
1938	Carrigaline	5–06	Kinsale	0–00	Ballyfeard
1937	Valley Rovers	4–03	Carrigaline	2–00	Shanbally
1936	Ballymartle	1–05	Valley Rovers	0–02	Carrigaline
1935	Carrigaline	5–02	Shamrocks	0–04	Kinsale
1934	Passage	5–03	Shamrocks	2–03	Ballyfeard
1933	Kinsale	5–04	Rochestown	1–02	
1932	Rochestown	4–02	Tracton	2–00	Shanbally
1931	Passage	5–02	Kinsale	3–00	
1930	Kinsale	6–04	Tracton	3–03	Monkstown
1929	Tracton	6–01	Ballygarvan	3–04	
1928	Ballinhassig				
1927					
1926	Carrigaline		Ballymartle		

== Records ==
=== Gaps ===
Longest gaps between successive championship titles:

- 45 years: Kinsale (1933-1978)
- 37 years: Tracton (1987-2024)
- 28 years: Valley Rovers (1988-2016)
- 27 years: Carrigaline (1947-1974)
- 27 years: Ballygarvan (1977-2004)
- 24 years: Shamrocks (1981-2005)
- 22 years: Tracton (1957-1979)
- 22 years: Ballymartle (1986-2008)
- 20 years: Valley Rovers (1968-1988)
- 18 years: Kinsale (1989-2007)
- 18 years: Ballinhassig (1928-1946)
- 18 years: Ballinhassig (1973-1991)

==== By decade ====
The most successful team of each decade, judged by number of South-East Junior Hurling Championship titles, is as follows:

- 1930s: Kinsale (2) 1930-33 & Carrigaline (2) 1935-38 & Ballymartle (2) 1936-39 & Passage (2) 1931-34
- 1940s: Ballymartle (2) 1940-43 & Tracton 1942-44 & Ballinhassig (2) 1946-48 & Valley Rovers (2) 1941-49
- 1950s: Ballinhassig (4) 1953-54-55-56
- 1960s: Ballinhassig (5) 1960-61-62-64-65
- 1970s: Ballinhassig (3) 1970-71-73
- 1980s: Kinsale (2) 1984-89 & Carrigaline (2) 1982-83 & Ballymartle (2) 1985-86 & Shamrocks (2) 1980-81
- 1990s: Ballinhassig (6) 1991-92-94-95-96-98
- 2000s: Ballinhassig (4) 2000-02-06-09
- 2010s: Ballinhassig (4) 2011-12-13-14
- 2020s: Kinsale (1) 2020 & Ballymartle (1) 2021 & Valley Rovers (1) 2022 & Belgooly (1) 2023 & Tracton (1) 2024

== See also ==
- South East Junior A Football Championship
