= Carrigdhoun GAA =

Gaelic games organisation division in County Cork, Ireland

Carrigdhoun
- Carraig Donn
- Founded: 1926
- County: Cork
- Colours

Playing kits
Standard colours

Senior Club Championships
	All Ireland	Munster champions	Cork champions
Football:	0	0	0
Hurling:	0	0	0

Carrigdhoun GAA is one of the eight baronies or Gaelic Athletic Association divisions that make up Cork. The division is made up of eleven Gaelic Athletic Association teams, making it one of the smaller divisions. The division is also known as the South East division. It extends from just south of Cork city down to Ballinspittle in the south of the county. The 11 teams are Ballinhassig, Ballygarvan, Ballymartle from Riverstick, Belgooly, Carrigaline, Crosshaven, Courcey Rovers from Ballinadee and Ballinspittle, Kinsale, Shamrocks from Ringaskiddy/Monkstown, Tracton from Minane Bridge, and Valley Rovers from Innishannon. The division selects players from all clubs except any that is senior (at present Courcey Rovers in hurling and Valley Rovers and Carrigaline in football) to represent the division in the Cork Senior Hurling Championship and in the Cork Senior Football Championship. The division's team wear a black and gold strip. The division organises championships from Junior and Under 21 levels. It used to run competitions from Under-12 to Minor (Under-18) until these were reorganised by the Cork County Board.

== History ==
The division was formed in 1926 when the county was divided into 8 different divisions.

== Member Clubs ==
- Ballinhassig
- Ballygarvan
- Ballymartle
- Belgooly
- Carrigaline
- Courcey Rovers
- Crosshaven
- Kinsale
- Shamrocks
- Tracton
- Valley Rovers

== Honours ==
- Cork Senior Hurling Championship, Runners-Up 1945
- Cork Senior Camogie Championship, Winners 2004

== Notable players ==
- John Kevin Coleman
- Martin Coleman
- Martin Coleman, Jnr
- Patrick Collins
- Terry Kelly
- Kieran Kingston
- Brendan Lombard
- Seán McCarthy
- Con Murphy
- Nicholas Murphy
- Michael Prout
- Alan Quirke
- Ger Spillane

== Hurling ==
=== Competitions ===
- South East Junior A Hurling Championship
- Carrigdhoun Junior B Hurling Championship
- Carrigdhoun Junior A Hurling League
- Carrigdhoun Under-21 Hurling Championship

=== 2027 Championship Grades ===
Championship	Club
Senior
Premier Senior	Carrigdhoun
Senior A	Ballinhassig
Senior A	Courcey Rovers
Intermediate
Premier Intermediate	Ballymartle
Premier Intermediate	Carrigaline
Premier Intermediate	Valley Rovers
Intermediate A	None
Junior
Premier Junior	Ballygarvan
Premier Junior	Tracton
Junior A	Ballinhassig (2)
Junior A	Ballygarvan (2)
Junior A	Ballymartle (2)
Junior A	Belgooly
Junior A	Carrigaline (2)
Junior A	Courcey Rovers (2)
Junior A	Kinsale
Junior A	Shamrocks
Junior A	Tracton (2)
Junior A	Valley Rovers (2)
Junior B	Ballinhassig (3)
Junior B	Ballygarvan (3)
Junior B	Ballymartle (3)
Junior B	Courcey Rovers (3)
Junior B	Crosshaven
Junior B	Kinsale (2)
Junior B	Valley Rovers (3)

== Football ==
=== Competitions ===
- South East Junior A Football Championship
- Carrigdhoun Junior B Football Championship
- Carrigdhoun Junior A Football League
- South-East Under 21A Football Championship
- South-East Under 21B Football Championship

=== 2027 Championship Grades ===
Championship	Club
Senior
Premier Senior	Carrigdhoun
Premier Senior	Carrigaline
Premier Senior	Valley Rovers
Senior A	None
Intermediate
Premier Intermediate	None
Intermediate A	None
Junior
Premier Junior	Kinsale
Junior A	Ballinhassig
Junior A	Ballygarvan
Junior A	Ballymartle
Junior A	Carrigaline (2)
Junior A	Courcey Rovers
Junior A	Crosshaven
Junior A	Shamrocks
Junior A	Valley Rovers (2)
Junior B	Ballinhassig (2)
Junior B	Ballygarvan (2)
Junior B	Belgooly
Junior B	Carrigaline (3)
Junior B	Kinsale (2)
Junior B	Tracton

== See also ==
- Cork GAA
  - Avondhu GAA
  - Beara GAA
  - Carbery GAA
  - Carrigdhoun GAA
  - Duhallow GAA
  - Imokilly GAA
  - Muskerry GAA
  - Seandún GAA
