= Castletownroche GAA =

Gaelic Athletic Association club in Ireland

Castletownroche
- Baile Caisleán de Róistigh
- Founded: 1888
- County: Cork
- Nickname: Castletown
- Colours
- Grounds: Castletownroche GAA Grounds
- Coordinates: 52°20′44″N 8°46′08″W

Playing kits
Standard colours

Senior Club Championships
	All Ireland	Munster champions	Cork champions
Hurling:	0	0	0

Castletownroche GAA club is a Gaelic Athletic Association club in Castletownroche, County Cork, Ireland, which is affiliated to the North Cork Board. The club is primarily concerned with the game of hurling, however, Gaelic football is also played under the name Abbey Rovers.

== History ==
Located in the village of Castletownroche, about halfway between Mallow and Fermoy, Castletownroche GAA Club was established in 1888. The new club competed in the Cork SHC in its early years, however, Castletown's first appearance in the final ended by conceding a walkover to St Finabrr's, following a dispute over the choice of the Cork Athletic Grounds as the venue. Castletownroche later lost the 1907 Cork SHC final to Dungourney by 5–17 to 0–03.

Castletownroche spend much of the next 50 years operating in the junior grade, and won five North Cork JHC titles between 1928 and 1960. The last of these divisional titles was subsequently converted into a Cork JHC title after beating Cloyne in the final. Two years later, Castletownroche secured senior status once again, after winning the Cork IHC title. The club, once again, slipped down the grades in the decades that followed, however, Castletownroche won Cork JBHC titles in 1998 and 2019.

== Honours ==
- Cork Intermediate Hurling Championship (1): 1964
- Cork Junior A Hurling Championship (2): 1960, 1982
- North Cork Junior A Hurling Championship (8): 1928, 1954, 1956, 1957, 1960, 1978, 1979, 1982
- Cork Junior B Hurling Championship (2): 1998, 2019
- Cork Junior C Football Championship (1): 2018
- North Cork Junior B1 football Championship (1): 2018
- North Cork Junior Football League (2): 2013, 2015

== Notable players ==
- Richie Browne
- Jonathan O'Callaghan
- David O'Leary
