= 2000 Cork Junior A Hurling Championship =

- Dates: 7 October – 12 November 2000
- Teams: 7
- Sponsor: TSB Bank
- Champions: Nemo Rangers (1st title); Eddie O'Leary (captain)
- Runners-up: Ballinhassig; Brendan Lombard (captain)

Tournament statistics
- Matches played: 6
- Goals scored: 12 (2 per match)
- Points scored: 111 (18.5 per match)
- Top scorer: Mark Cotter (1–14)

The 2000 Cork Junior A Hurling Championship was the 103rd staging of the Cork Junior A Hurling Championship since its establishment by the Cork County Board in 1895. The championship ran from 7 October to and 12 November 2000.

The final was played on 12 November 2000 at Páirc Uí Chaoimh in Cork, between Nemo Rangers and Ballinhassig, in what was their first ever meeting in the final. Nemo Rangers won the match by 2–08 to 1–10 to claim their first ever championship title.

Mark Cotter was the championship's top scorer with 1–14.

== Qualification ==
Division	Championship	Champions
Avondhu	North Cork Junior A Hurling Championship	Dromina
Carbery	West Cork Junior A Hurling Championship	Ballinascarthy
Carrigdhoun	South East Junior A Hurling Championship	Ballinhassig
Duhallow	Duhallow Junior A Hurling Championship	Freemount
Imokilly	East Cork Junior A Hurling Championship	Watergrasshill
Muskerry	Mid Cork Junior A Hurling Championship	Grenagh
Seandún	City Junior A Hurling Championship	Nemo Rangers

== Results ==
=== Quarter-finals ===
7 October 2000 Quarter-final	Nemo Rangers	1-13 - 2-07	Ballinascarthy	Jack Barrett Park
	M Cotter 0-6, A Cronin 1-2, M Morgan 0-2, D Creedon 0-1, M Cronin 0-1, J Coogan 0-1.		W Deasy 2-2, C Murphy 0-3, T Coffey 0-1, K Dineen 0-1.

8 October 2000 Quarter-final	Freemount	0-11 - 0-10	Grenagh	Páirc Uí Shíocháin
	J O'Flynn 0-6, D Broderick 0-2, B Broderick 0-1, B Murphy 0-1, A Keane 0-1.		A Dorgan 0-3, M Barry 0-3, T Kenny 0-3, O Dennehy 0-1.

15 October 2000 Quarter-final	Dromina	2-13 - 1-10	Watergrasshill	Páirc Uí Chaoimh
	M Finn 1-5, J Hamilton 1-1, P Gould 0-3, J Delee 0-3, P Hayes 0-1.		P Cahill 0-5, D O'Leary 1-1, R Cahill 0-3, D Ryan 0-1.

Ballinhassig received a bye to the semi-final stage.

=== Semi-finals ===
22 October 2000 Semi-final	Nemo Rangers	1-07 - 0-04	Freemount	Castletownroche Grounds
	M Cotter 0-5, A Cronin 1-1, W Morgan 0-1.		J O'Flynn 0-2, G Withers 0-1, M Enright 0-1.

22 October 2000 Semi-final	Ballinhassig	1-12 - 1-06	Dromina	Páirc Uí Chaoimh
	J O'Sullivan 0-5, D Lombard 1-0, S McCarthy 0-3, B O'Sullivan 0-1, T Coleman 0-1, J Mullaney 0-1, D Dineen 0-1.		M Finn 1-3 L Hayes 0-1, G Buckley 0-1, J Delee 0-1.

=== Final ===
12 November 2000 Final	Nemo Rangers	2-08 - 1-10	Ballinhassig	Páirc Uí Chaoimh
	M Cotter 1-3, S Calnan 1-2, J Masters 0-2, D Niblock 0-1.		D Duggan 1-2, B O'Sullivan 0-3, J Mullaney 0-2, S McCarthy 0-1, J O'Sullivan 0-1, D Lombard 0-1.

== Championship statistics ==
=== Top scorers ===
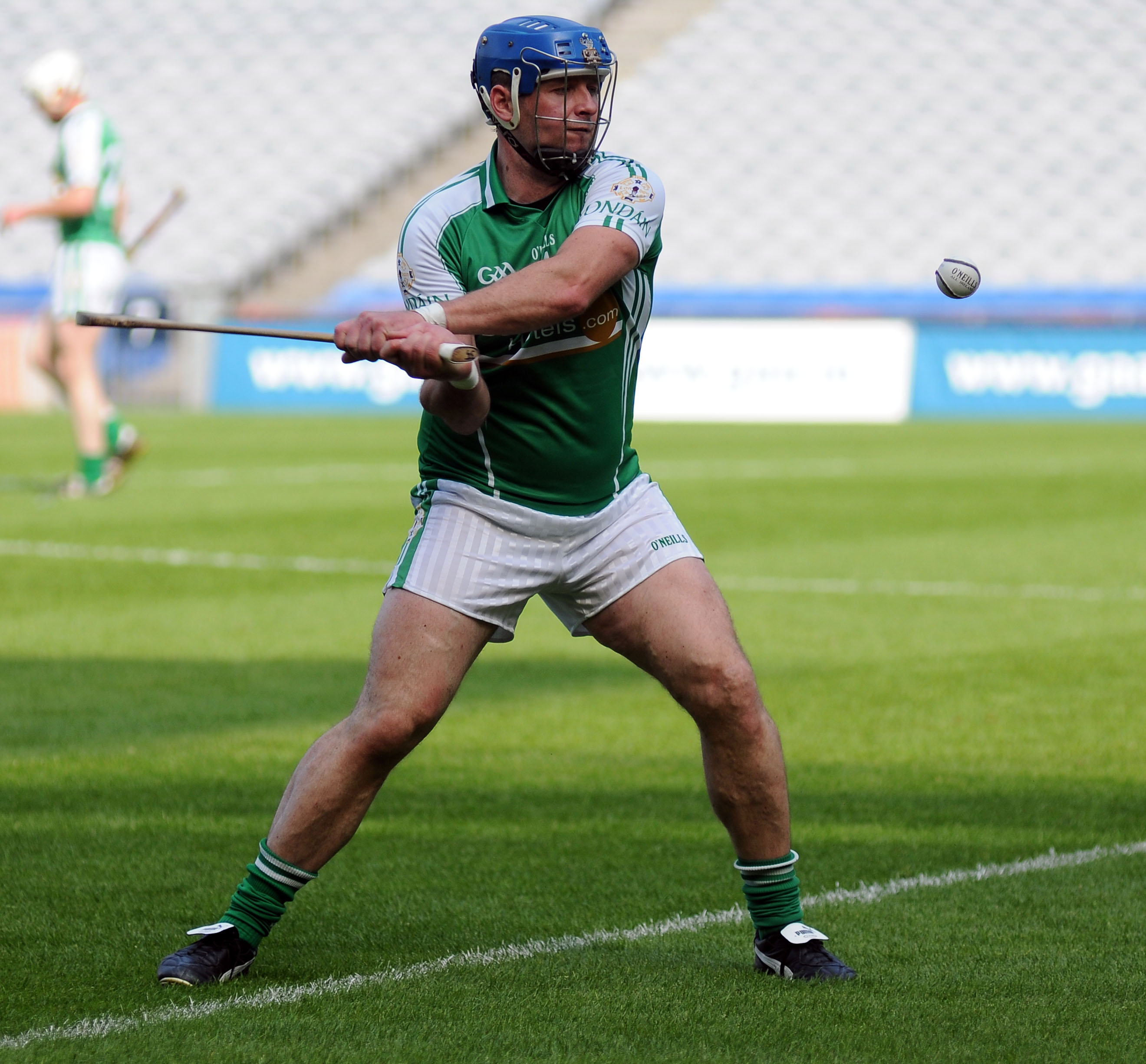
Dromina's Martin Finn scored 2-08 during the championship.

Rank	Player	Club	Tally	Total	Matches	Average
1	Mark Cotter	Nemo Rangers	1-14	17	3	5.66
2	Martin Finn	Dromina	2-08	14	2	7.00
3	Alan Cronin	Nemo Rangers	2-03	9	3	3.00
4	Willie Deasy	Ballinascarthy	2-02	8	1	8.00
4	John O'Flynn	Freemount	0-08	8	2	4.00
