= John Kevin Coleman =

Cork hurler

Personal information
- Native name: Seán Caoimhín Ó Colmáin (Irish)
- Nickname: J. K.
- Born: 1944 (age 81–82) Ballinhassig, County Cork, Ireland
- Occupations: Businessman and politician
- Height: 5 ft 9 in (175 cm)

Sport
- Sport: Hurling
- Position: Centre-forward
Clubs
- Years: Club
- Ballinhassig → Carrigdhoun
Club titles
- Cork titles: 0
Inter-county
- Years: County
- 1965-1968: Cork
Inter-county titles
- Munster titles: 0
- All-Irelands: 0
- NHL: 0

John Kevin Coleman (born 1944) is an Irish former hurler and politician. At club level he played with Ballinhassig, divisional side Carrigdhoun and was also a member of the Cork senior hurling team. Coleman also spent some time as an elected representative with Cork County Council.

== Playing career ==
Coleman first played hurling at juvenile and underage levels with the Ballinhassig club while also lining out with St. Finbarr's College in the Harty Cup. He progressed to adult club level, alongside his six brothers, and enjoyed a hugely successful career, winning five Carrigdhoun JFC titles, two Cork JHC titles and two Cork IHC titles. Coleman also lined out with divisional side Carrigdhoun.

Coleman first appeared on the inter-county scene with Cork as a member of the minor team in 1962. He later spent one season with the under-21 team. Coleman was a member of the intermediate team that won the All-Ireland IHC title in 1965. He was drafted onto the senior team that same year and made a number of appearances in the National League over subsequent seasons. Coleman made his only championship appearance when he came on as a substitute in Cork's defeat by Tipperary in the 1968 Munster final.

== Political career ==
Coleman was elected to Cork County Council as a Fianna Fáil candidate in the 1985 local elections. He later left the party, joined the Progressive Democrats and was an unsuccessful candidate in the 1989 general election in the Cork South-Central constituency. Coleman lost his council seat at the 1991 local elections.

== Honours ==
St Finbarrs College

- All-ireland Colleges Senior Hurling Championship: (1) 1963
- Munster Colleges Senior Hurling Championship: (1) 1963

Ballinhassig

- Cork Intermediate Hurling Championship: 1975, 1977
- Cork Junior Hurling Championship: 1965, 1973
- South East Junior A Hurling Championship: 1964, 1965, 1970, 1971, 1973

Cork

- All-Ireland Intermediate Hurling Championship: 1965
- Munster Intermediate Hurling Championship: 1965, 1967
