= 2004 Cork Intermediate Hurling Championship =

Irish hurling competition

- Dates: 30 April 2004 – 24 October 2004
- Teams: 16
- Sponsor: Permanent TSB
- Champions: Watergrasshill (1st title); Pádraig O'Regan (captain); John O'Regan (manager)
- Runners-up: Dromina; Donal Shaughnessy (captain); Simon Morrissey (manager)

Tournament statistics
- Matches played: 26
- Goals scored: 54 (2.08 per match)
- Points scored: 617 (23.73 per match)
- Top scorer(s): James Masters (4-34)

The 2004 Cork Intermediate Hurling Championship was the 95th staging of the Cork Intermediate Hurling Championship since its establishment by the Cork County Board in 1909. The draw for the opening round fixtures took place on 10 February 2004. The championship began on 30 April 2004 and ended on 24 October 2004.

On 24 October 2004, Watergrasshill won the championship after a 2-13 to 2–08 defeat of Dromina in the final at Páirc Uí Chaoimh. It remains their only championship title in the grade.

Nemo Rangers' James Masters was the championship's top scorer with 4-34.

== Format change ==
In 2003 the Cork County Board Executive established a Hurling Championship Review Committee in an effort to improve the competitiveness of the Cork Senior Championship. The committee also proposed the splitting of the existing Cork Intermediate Championship in two with the creation of a 16-team Premier Intermediate Championship and a 16-team Intermediate Hurling Championship. The 10 lowest-ranked teams from the 2003 Intermediate Championship were joined by the 2003 Junior Championship winners as well as the individual divisional winners - Argideen Rangers, Kanturk, Carrigaline, Blackrock and Watergrasshill. Grenagh, who won the Mid Cork Junior Championship division in the junior grade, declined the invitation.

== Results ==
=== First round ===
30 April 2004 First round	Kilbrittain	2-09 - 1-08	Argideen Rangers	Páirc Uí Mhurchú
	A Hayes 2-3, P Sexton 0-4, F O'Connell 0-1, E Sheehy 0-1.		M Walsh 1-2, S O'Mahony 0-5, B Harte 0-1.

1 May 2004 First round	Cobh	0-10 - 1-12	Dromina	Castletownroche
	D Barrett 0-4, M O'Connor 0-3, B Meaney 0-2, D Meaney 0-1.		M Finn 1-7, A O'Shaughnessy 0-2, J Finn 0-1, G Healy 0-1, L Hayes 0-1.

1 May 2004 First round	Watergrasshill	1-15 - 0-11	Bandon	Páirc Liam Mhic Cárthaigh
	P O'Regan 0-7, J Halbert 1-0, W O'Leary 0-3, P Cahill 0-2, K Coakley 0-1, O Curtin 0-1, E O'Reilly 0-1.		D Lucey 0-3, N O'Rourke 0-2, J Nyhan 0-2, D O'Donoghue 0-1, D Cronin 0-1, K Hurley 0-1, J Hickey 0-1.

2 May 2004 First round	Nemo Rangers	1-15 - 0-15	Kanturk	Kildorrery
	J Masters 0-9, W Morgan 1-1, A Cronin 0-2, B Twomey 0-2, K Walsh 0-1.		F Browne 0-6, D Dwane 0-6, P Kerins 0-1, B Mullane 0-1, A Nash 0-1.

2 May 2004 First round	Ballymartle	3-19 - 1-11	Milford	Mallow
	B Coleman 2-1, Barry Dwyer 0-7, P Coughlan 0-4, C O'Brien 1-0, G Cummins 0-3, D McCarthy 0-1, R Dwyer 0-1, C Sheehan 0-1, J O'Mahony 0-1,		M Morrissey 1-2, E Dillon 0-5, J O'Brien 0-2, S Curtin 0-1, R Geary 0-1.

3 May 2004 First round	Carrigaline	1-13 - 2-10	Glen Rovers	Minane Bridge
	N Murphy 1-2, B O'Driscoll 0-3, B Hogan 0-3, M O'Sullivan 0-2, G Cooney 0-1, P Ahern 0-1, P Murphy 0-1.		S O'Brien 1-2, S Kennefick 1-0, C O'Riordan 0-2, A McCarthy 0-2, D Busteed 0-2, L Galvin 0-1.

7 May 2004 First round replay	Carrigaline	0-07 - 1-08	Glen Rovers	Minane Bridge
	B O'Driscoll 0-3, B Hogan 0-2, M O'Sullivan 0-1, K O'Driscoll 0-1.		C O'Riordan 1-3, L Treacy 0-1, P Twomey 0-1, K McCarthy 0-1, S Kennefick 0-1, K O'Callaghan 0-1.

8 May 2004 First round	Éire Óg	0-10 - 0-11	Blackrock	Ballinhassig
	T O'Leary 0-4, T Dineen 0-2, R O'Driscoll 0-1, N Brennan 0-1, J Malone 0-1, D Corkery 0-1.		E Kiely 0-6, L Meaney 0-2, A Ryan 0-1, P Sullivan 0-1, M O'Keeffe 0-1.

8 May 2004 First round	Valley Rovers	1-19 - 1-08	St. Vincent's	Cloughduv
	K Canty 0-6, E Collins 1-2, J Hurley 0-4, B Canty 0-3, R Butler 0-3, E Manning 0-1.		D O'Callaghan 1-3, C Barry 0-3, F Murphy 0-1, J Buckley 0-1.

=== Second round ===
16 May 2004 Second round	Cobh	2-16 - 3-12	Argideen Rangers	Páirc Liam Mhic Cárthaigh
	G Meaney 1-6, D Barrett 1-4, B Ahern 0-2, M O'Connor 0-1, R Meaney 0-1, P Sloane 0-1, B Meaney 0-1.		M Walsh 2-8, B Harte 1-0, S O'Mahony 0-3, B Hennessy 0-1.

28 May 2004 Second round	Éire Óg	3-08 - 1-19	Bandon	Ballinhassig
	J Crowley 1-3, F Sheehan 1-1, J Malone 0-4, N Brennan 1-0.		D Lucey 1-3, D O'Donoghue 0-6, K Hurley 0-5, J Hickey 0-3, J O'Regan 0-1, J Nyhan 0-1.

28 May 2004 Second round	Carrigaline	0-10 - 0-10	Milford	Croke Memorial Park
	B Horgan 0-3, B O'Driscoll 0-3, N Murphy 0-2, K O'Driscoll 0-1, P Ahern 0-1.		J O'Brien 0-4, E Dillon 0-3, M Morrissey 0-1, N Geary 0-1, M O'Connell 0-1.

28 May 2004 Second round	St. Vincent's	0-13 - 1-09	Kanturk	Coachford Sportsfield
	D Callaghan 0-5, C Barry 0-4, J Buckley 0-2, C Ahern 0-2.		D Dwane 0-7, B Mullane 1-2.

22 June 2004 Second round replay	Carrigaline	1-12 - 1-06	Milford	Croke Memorial Park
	N Murphy 1-1, B O'Driscoll 0-4, B Horgan 0-3, M Irwin 0-2, M O'Sullivan 0-1, G Cooney 0-1.		J Cremin 1-0, E Dillon 0-3, M Morrissey 0-2, J O'Brien 0-1.

=== Third round ===
12 June 2004 Third round	Bandon	0-15 - 1-10	Ballymartle	Páirc Uí Ríogáin
	D O'Donoghue 0-5, J O'Regan 0-2, D Lucey 0-2, J Nyhan 0-1, J Burke 0-1, D Cronin 0-1, J Hickey 0-1, J Milner 0-1.		B Dywer 0-7, G Cummins 1-0, R Dwyer 0-1, C Sheehan 0-1, P Coughlan 0-1.

12 June 2004 Third round	Cobh	2-09 - 0-12	Blackrock	Páirc Shéamuis de Barra
	G Meaney 1-4, D Barrett 1-0, P Sloane 0-2, D Meaney 0-1, D O'Rourke 0-1, M O'Connor 0-1.		E Kiely 0-7, K O'Riordan 0-3, I Walsh 0-1, D Coakley 0-1.

19 June 2004 Third round	Glen Rovers	1-05 - 2-11	Nemo Rangers	Mayfield
	C O'Riordan 0-4, A McCarthy 1-0, B Wall 0-1.		J Masters 2-7, B Twomey 0-2, W Morgan 0-1, M Morgan 0-1.

9 July 2004 Third round	Watergrasshill	0-25 - 0-10	Kilbriittain	Church Road
	R Cahill 0-9, J Halbert 0-6, N O'Riordan 0-4, P O'Regan 0-2, P Cahill 0-2, W O'Leary 0-1, E O'Reilly 0-1.		P Sexton 0-5, D Deasy 0-1, A Hayes 0-1, C O'Leary 0-1, F Hickey 0-1, D Murphy 0-1.

- Valley Rovers, Carrigaline, Dromina and St. Vincent's received byes in this round.

=== Quarter-finals ===
9 July 2004 Quarter-final	Dromina	3-12 - 2-13	St. Vincent's	Mallow
	M Hayes 1-6, R Morrissey 1-3, J Finn 1-0, A O'Shaughnessy 0-2, G Hayes 0-1.		A Buckley 0-7, D O'Connor 1-2, C Barry 1-1, JP Murphy 0-2, F Murphy 0-1.

18 July 2004 Quarter-final	Watergrasshill	1-08 - 0-11	Bandon	Páirc Uí Rinn
	J Foley 1-2, R Cahill 0-2, P Cahill 0-1, N O'Riordan 0-1, P O'Regan 0-1, S O'Leary 0-1.		D Lucey 0-4, J Hickey 0-2, J Nyhan 0-2, K Walsh 0-1, D O'Donoghue 0-1, C Dullea 0-1.

24 July 2004 Quarter-final replay	Watergrasshill	0-15 - 0-09	Bandon	Páirc Uí Rinn
	P O'Regan 0-7, J Halbert 0-2, N O'Riordan 0-2, P Cahill 0-1, E O'Reilly 0-1, O Curtin 0-1, K Coakley 0-1.		D O'Donoghue 0-3, N O'Rourke 0-2, J Hickey 0-1, K Hurley 0-1, J O'Regan 0-1, D Burke 0-1.

21 August 2004 Quarter-final	Nemo Rangers	1-15 - 0-14	Cobh	Riverstown Sportsfield
	J Masters 1-9, M Cronin 0-4, A Cronin 0-2.		J Meaney 0-5, P Sloane 0-3, D Barrett 0-2, L Geaney 0-2, R O'Connell 0-1, R Meaney 0-1.

28 August 2004 Quarter-final	Valley Rovers	2-14 - 1-10	Carrigaline	Jack Barrett Park
	R O'Donovan 1-3, J O'Donovan 1-0, J Young 0-3, C O'Riordan 0-2, E Manning 0-2, B Canty 0-1, K Canty 0-1, J Hurley 0-1, R Butler 0-1.		G Harrington 1-2, B O'Driscoll 0-4, N Murphy 0-3, P Murphy 0-1.

=== Semi-finals ===
25 September 2004 Semi-final	Dromina	0-15 - 1-09	Valley Rovers	Millstreet
	M Finn 0-7, A O'Shaughnessy 0-3, D Morrissey 0-1, G Hayes 0-1, J Finn 0-1, R Morrissey 0-1, G Healy 0-1.		J Hurley 0-4, E O'Sullivan 1-0, B Canty 0-2, R O'Donovan 0-2, E Collins 0-1.

26 September 2004 Semi-final	Watergrasshill	4-16 - 1-12	Nemo Rangers	Páirc Uí Rinn
	E O'Reilly 2-2, J Foley 2-2, P O'Regan 0-5, J Halbert 0-2, P Cahill 0-2, O Curtin 0-1, S O'Callaghan 0-1, N O'Riordan 0-1.		J Masters 1-9, M Cronin 0-1, W Morgan 0-1, M Cotter 0-1.

=== Final ===
24 October 2004 Final	Watergrasshill	2-13 - 2-08	Dromina	Páirc Uí Chaoimh
	J Foley 1-1, E O'Reilly 1-0, J Halbert 0-3, P O'Regan 0-3, P Cahill 0-2, W O'Leary 0-2, K Coakley 0-1, R Cahill 0-1.		M Finn 2-4, J Finn 0-2, A O'Shaughnessy 0-1, R Crowley 0-1.

== Championship statistics ==
=== Top scorers ===
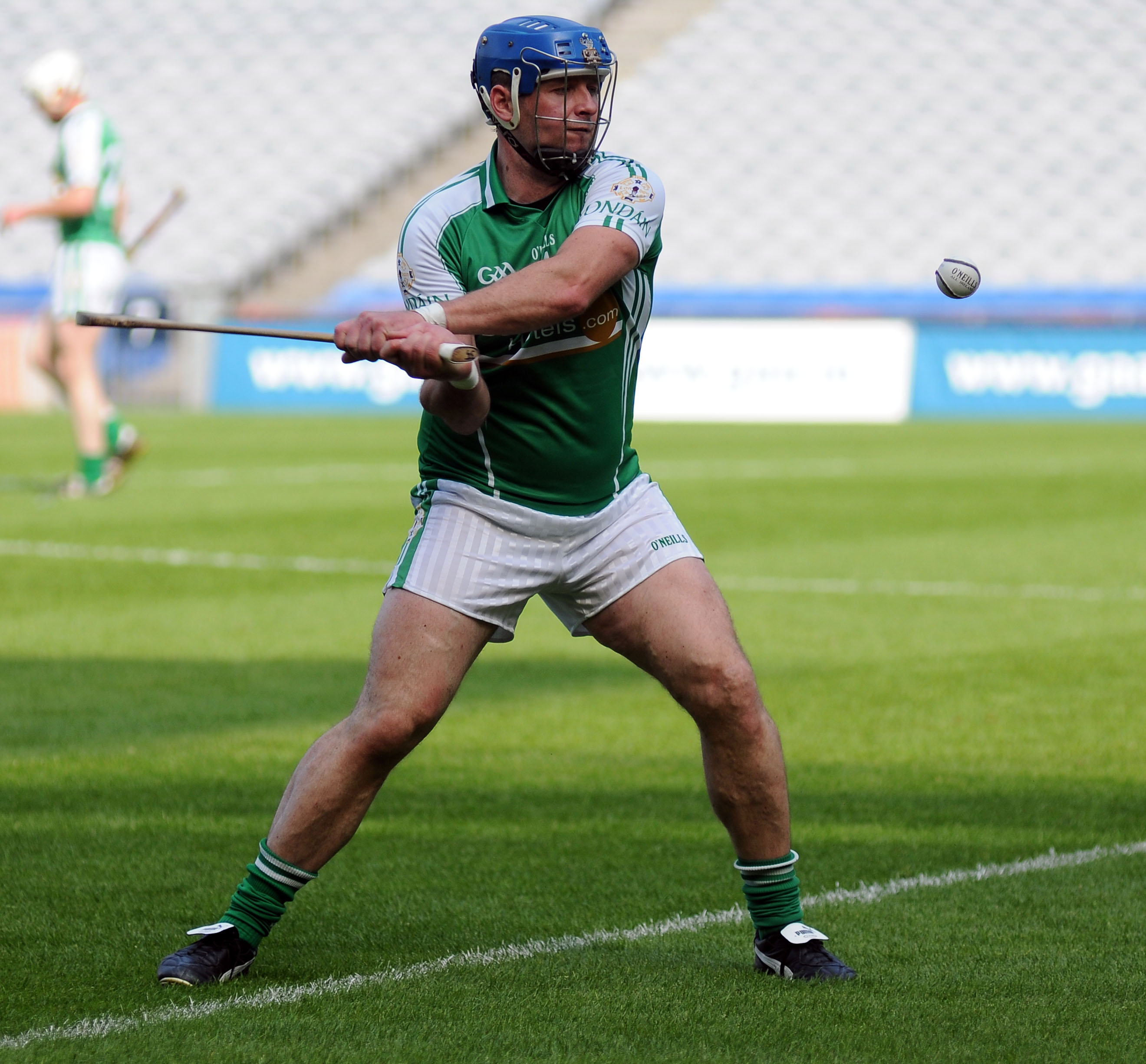
Dromina's Martin Finn scored 4-24 during the championship.

Overall

Rank	Player	Club	Tally	Total	Matches	Average
1	James Masters	Nemo Rangers	4-34	46	4	11.50
2	Martin Finn	Dromina	4-24	36	4	9.00
3	Paddy O'Regan	Watergrasshill	0-25	25	6	4.16
4	Ger Meaney	Cobh	2-15	21	4	5.25
5	Michael Walsh	Argideen Rangers	3-10	19	2	9.50
6	Jason Foley	Watergrasshill	4-05	17	6	2.83
7	Derek Barrett	Cobh	2-10	16	4	4.00
7	John Halbert	Watergrasshill	1-13	16	6	2.66
7	Darren O'Donoghue	Bandon	0-16	16	5	3.20
8	Donagh Lucey	Bandon	1-12	15	5	3.00

In a single game

Rank	Player	Club	Tally	Total	Opposition
1	Michael Walsh	Argideen Rangers	2-08	14	Cobh
2	James Masters	Nemo Rangers	2-07	13	Glen Rovers
3	James Masters	Nemo Rangers	1-09	12	Cobh
3	James Masters	Nemo Rangers	1-09	12	Watergrasshill
4	Martin Finn	Dromina	2-04	10	Watergrasshill
4	Martin Finn	Dromina	1-07	10	Cobh
5	Alan Hayes	Kilbrittain	2-03	9	Argideen Rangers
5	Ger Meaney	Cobh	1-06	9	Argideen Rangers
5	Martin Finn	Dromina	1-06	9	St. Vincent's
5	James Masters	Nemo Rangers	0-09	9	Kanturk
5	Richard Cahill	Watergrasshill	0-09	9	Kilbrittain
