= Patrick Collins (hurler) =

Irish hurler (born 1996)

Personal information
- Native name: Pádraig Ó Coileáin (Irish)
- Nickname: Pa
- Born: 12 September 1996 (age 30) Ballinhassig, County Cork, Ireland
- Occupation: Garda sergeant
- Height: 6 ft 0 in (183 cm)

Sport
- Sport: Hurling
- Position: Goalkeeper
Clubs
Years	Club	Apps (scores)
2013-present 2016-2018	Ballinhassig → Cork IT	45 (4-57); 10 (1-06)
Club titles
- Cork titles: 0
College
- Years: College
- 2015-2019: Cork Institute of Technology
College titles
- Fitzgibbon titles: 0
Inter-county*
Years	County	Apps (scores)
2015-present	Cork	22 (0-01)
Inter-county titles
- Munster titles: 3
- All-Irelands: 0
- NHL: 1
- All Stars: 0
- *Inter County team apps and scores correct as of 19:52, 7 July 2024.

Patrick Collins (born 12 September 1996) is an Irish hurler who plays as a goalkeeper for club side Ballinhassig, university side Cork Institute of Technology and at inter-county level with the Cork senior hurling team.

== Early life ==
Collins was born and raised in Ballinhassig, County Cork. His father, Pat Collins, began the family's association with goalkeeping by lining in that position for the Ballinhassig club. Collins's brothers, Michael, Matthew and Ger, have all lined out for Cork in various grades of hurling, while his sister, Caitríona, won an All-Ireland ICC title with the Cork intermediate camogie team in 2018.

Collins first played hurling to a high standard as a student at Coláiste an Spioraid Naoimh in Bishopstown. He later studied at Cork Institute of Technology (CIT) and won an All-Ireland Division 1 Freshers' HC title in 2016 after a defeat of Dublin City University in the final. Collins later progressed to CIT's Fitzgibbon Cup team.

== Club career ==
Collins began his club hurling career at juvenile and underage levels with Ballinhassig. He won a Southeast U21AHC title in 2015 after scoring 1-07 from full-forward in the 2–16 to 2–12 defeat of Carrigaline in the final. By that stage Collins had already joined Ballinhassig's senior team, having made his debut in 2013.

== Inter-county career ==
Collins was just 15-years-old when he first played for Cork as a member of the minor team in 2012. His three years in the grade ended without success. Collins was 16-years-old and in his second season as a minor when he made his debut with the under-21 team. He was in goal when Cork lost the 2014 Munster U21 final to Clare by 1–28 to 1–13. Collin's five-year association with the under-21 team ended with a two-point defeat by Limerick in the 2017 Munster U21 final.

Collins was just out of the minor grade when he was drafted onto the senior team by manager Jimmy Barry-Murphy in advance of the 2015 season. He was third-choice goalkeeper behind Anthony Nash and Darren McCarthy and made his debut in a preliminary round defeat of the University of Limerick in the pre-season Waterford Crystal Cup in January 2015. Collin's first National Hurling League appearance came in a one-point defeat by Kilkenny in March 2016.

Collins eventually became second-choice goalkeeper and understudy to Nash. He won consecutive Munster SHC medals as a non-playing substitute in 2017 and 2018, following consecutive defeats of Clare in the finals. Nash's inter-county retirement at the end of the 2020 season resulted in Collins becoming first-choice goalkeeper. In August 2021, he lined out in goal when Cork suffered a 3–32 to 1–22 defeat by Limerick in the 2021 All-Ireland final. Collins was again in goal when Cork lost the 2022 National League final to Waterford.

== Career statistics ==
=== Club ===
As of 16 November 2025

Team	Year	Cork SHC		Munster		All-Ireland		Total	
Team	Year	Apps	Score	Apps	Score	Apps	Score	Apps	Score
Ballinhassig	2013	3	0-02	—		—		3	0-02
Ballinhassig	Total	3	0-02	—		—		3	0-02
Ballinhassig	Year	Cork PIHC		Munster		All-Ireland		Total	
Ballinhassig	Year	Apps	Score	Apps	Score	Apps	Score	Apps	Score
Ballinhassig	2014	3	1-18	—		—		3	1-18
Ballinhassig	2015	3	1-09	—		—		3	1-09
Ballinhassig	2016	3	1-07	—		—		3	1-07
Ballinhassig	2017	4	0-02	—		—		4	0-02
Ballinhassig	2018	1	0-03	—		—		1	0-03
Ballinhassig	2019	2	0-01	—		—		2	0-01
Ballinhassig	2020	3	0-02	—		—		3	0-02
Ballinhassig	2021	5	0-00	—		—		5	0-00
Ballinhassig	2022	5	0-06	—		—		5	0-06
Ballinhassig	2023	3	0-00	—		—		3	0-00
Ballinhassig	2024	4	1-04	—		—		4	1-04
Ballinhassig	2025	5	0-02	1	0-01	—		6	0-03
Ballinhassig	Total	41	4-54	1	0-01	—		42	4-55
Ballinhassig	Year	Cork SAHC		Munster		All-Ireland		Total	
Ballinhassig	Year	Apps	Score	Apps	Score	Apps	Score	Apps	Score
Ballinhassig	2026	0	0-00	—		—		0	0-00
Ballinhassig	Total	0	0-00	—		—		0	0-00
Career total		44	4-56	1	0-01	—		45	4-57

=== Division ===
As of match played 2 April 2018.

Team	Year	Cork SHC	
Team	Year	Apps	Score
Cork Institute of Technology	2016	4	0-01
Cork Institute of Technology	2017	4	0-04
Cork Institute of Technology	2018	2	1-01
Total		10	1-06

=== Inter-county ===
As of 7 July 2024.

Team	Year	National League			Munster		All-Ireland		Total	
Team	Year	Division	Apps	Score	Apps	Score	Apps	Score	Apps	Score
Cork	2015	Division 1A	0	0-00	0	0-00	0	0-00	0	0-00
Cork	2016	Division 1A	2	0-00	0	0-00	0	0-00	2	0-00
Cork	2017	Division 1A	0	0-00	0	0-00	0	0-00	0	0-00
Cork	2018	Division 1A	2	0-00	0	0-00	0	0-00	2	0-00
Cork	2019	Division 1A	1	0-00	0	0-00	0	0-00	1	0-00
Cork	2020	Division 1A	3	0-00	0	0-00	0	0-00	3	0-00
Cork	2021	Division 1A	4	0-00	1	0-00	4	0-00	9	0-00
Cork	2022	Division 1A	6	0-00	4	0-01	2	0-00	12	0-01
Cork	2023	Division 1A	5	0-00	4	0-00	—		9	0-00
Cork	2024	Division 1A	4	0-01	4	0-00	3	0-00	11	0-01
Total			27	0-01	13	0-01	9	0-00	49	0-02

== Honours ==
Cork Institute of Technology

- All-Ireland Division 1 Freshers' Hurling Championship: 2016

Ballinhassig

- South-East Under-21 A Hurling Championship: 2015
- Cork Premier Intermediate Hurling Championship: 2025

Cork

- Munster Senior Hurling Championship: 2017, 2018, 2025
- National Hurling League: 2025
