= 1977 Cork Intermediate Hurling Championship =

Irish hurling competition

- Dates: 22 May - 2 October 1977
- Teams: 13
- Champions: Ballinhassig (2nd title); Jim Hayes (captain)
- Runners-up: Ballyhea

Tournament statistics
- Matches played: 12
- Goals scored: 55 (4.58 per match)
- Points scored: 255 (21.25 per match)

The 1977 Cork Intermediate Hurling Championship was the 68th staging of the Cork Intermediate Hurling Championship since its establishment by the Cork County Board in 1909. The draw for the opening round fixtures took place at the Cork Convention on 30 January 1977. The championship ran from 22 May to 2 October 1977.

On 2 October 1977 Ballinhassig won the championship following a 1–16 to 1–11 defeat of Ballyhea in the final at Páirc Uí Chaoimh. This was their second championship title overall and their first title since 1975.

== Results ==
=== First round ===
22 May 1977 First round	Ballyhea	4-11 - 4-08	Newtownshandrum	Dr. Mannix Sportsfield
	J Ryan 2-0, D O'Sullivan 2-0, W Shanahan 0-3, D Ryan 0-2, C Brassil 0-2, P Ryan 0-1, D Flynn 0-1, P Hartnett 0-1, N Ronan 0-1.		J Buckley 3-3, J Carroll 1-0 (og), D Herlihy 0-2, PJ Greensmith 0-2, J Coughlan 0-1.	Referee: W Horgan (Mayfield)

11 June 1977 First round	Watergrasshill	0-08 - 4-14	Ballinhassig	Páirc Uí Chaoimh
	G O'Herlihy 0-3, B O'Farrell 0-2, P Regan 0-1, T O'Riordan 0-1, D Kearney 0-1.		JK Coleman 1-6, B Coleman 1-2, W Walsh 1-1, J Reynolds 1-0, TF Hayes 0-2, O Jordan 0-2, D Coleman 0-1.

2 July 1977 First round	Inniscarra	0-13 - 0-10	Carrigtwohill	Páirc Uí Chaoimh
	T Ryan 0-10, H O'Sullivan 0-1, F Cooper 0-1, M Healy 0-1.		M Sheehan 0-3, D O'Connor 0-2, P O'Connor 0-1, D Cashman 0-1, M Roche 0-1, P Keane 0-1, J Keane 0-1.

31 July 1977 First round	St. Vincent's	3-05 - 2-13	St. Finbarr's	Páirc Uí Chaoimh
	D Lenihan 1-2, B O'Neill 1-1, J Russell 1-0, T Nagle 0-1, T Virgo 0-1.		D O'Shea 1-7, T O'Connor 1-0, J Foster 0-3, D Brosnan 0-3.

31 July 1977 First round	Midleton	3-17 - 2-05	Blackrock	Carrigtwohill Grounds

=== Quarter-finals ===
12 June 1977 Quarter-final	Cloughduv	4-14 - 4-03	Passage	Ballinhassig Grounds
	T O'Mahony 3-1, C Kelly 0-7, M Walsh 1-1, L Lynch 1-0, T Dunne 0-3, P Lucey 0-1, M Egan 0-1.		G O'Sullivan 3-0, M Keane 1-0, S Meade 0-2, G O'Connor 0-1.

3 July 1977 Quarter-final	Ballinhassig	2-12 - 2-09	Newcestown	Charlie Hurley Park
	D Coleman 1-2, B Coleman 0-4, J O'Mahony 1-0, JK Coleman 0-3, P Forde 0-1, JH O'Sullivan 0-1, J Reynolds 0-1.		T Crowley 2-7, J McGann 0-1, D Kelly 0-1.

13 August 1977 Quarter-final	Ballyhea	6-13 - 5-07	St. Finbarr's	Moore Park

14 August 1977 Quarter-final	Inniscarra	5-08 - 0-15	Midleton	Páirc Uí Chaoimh
	T Ryan 0-7, F Cooper 2-0, B Ryan 2-0, M McDonnell 1-0, H O'Sullivan 0-1.		J Fenton 0-9, J Glavin 0-2, J Hurley 0-1, D Mulcahy 0-1, S O'Farrell 0-1, J O'Brien 0-1, D Hurley 0-1.

=== Semi-finals ===
14 August 1977 Semi-final	Ballinhassig	0-12 - 0-11	Cloughduv	Páirc Uí Chaoimh
	W Walsh 0-3, DD Coleman 0-3, JK Coleman 0-2, J Reynolds 0-2, TF Hayes 0-1.D Brosnan 0-1.		C Kelly 0-6, T O'Mahony 0-2, T Dunne 0-1, P Lucey 0-1, M Mehigan 0-1.

25 September 1977 Semi-final	Inniscarra	1-06 - 2-14	Ballyhea	Páirc Uí Chaoimh
	M Healy 1-1, T Ryan 0-3, T Griffin 0-1, H O'Brien 0-1.		P Ryan 1-2, J Ryan 1-2, P Hartnett 0-5, W Shanahan 0-2, M Morrissey 0-1, D O'Sullivan 0-1, D Regan 0-1.

=== Final ===
2 October 1977 Final	Ballinhassig	1-16 - 1-11	Ballyhea	Páirc Uí Chaoimh
	JK Coleman 1-3, Derry Coleman 0-4, B Coleman 0-3, Declan Coleman 0-2, J Reynold 0-2, J Walsh 0-1, W Walsh 0-1.		D Ryan 1-8, P Hartnett 0-1, W Shanahan 0-1, P Ryan 0-1.
