= 1973 Cork Junior Hurling Championship =

Irish hurling competition

- Dates: 16 September - 11 November 1973
- Teams: 7
- Champions: Ballinhassig (2nd title); John Kevin Coleman (captain)
- Runners-up: Meelin; Kevin O'Sullivan (captain)

Tournament statistics
- Matches played: 6
- Goals scored: 26 (4.33 per match)
- Points scored: 97 (16.17 per match)

The 1973 Cork Junior Hurling Championship was the 76th staging of the Cork Junior Hurling Championship since its establishment by the Cork County Board.

On 11 November 1973, Ballinhassig won the championship following a 1-06 to 0-05 defeat of Meelin in the final at the Coachford Sportsfield. This was their second championship title overall and a first title since 1965.

== Results ==
=== Quarter-finals ===
16 September 1973 Quarter-final	Ballinhassig	6-09 - 3-05	Aghabullogue	Charlie Hurley Park
	W Walsh 3-0, JK Coleman 1-3, F Roche 1-0, Derry Coleman 1-0, F Hayes 0-2, B Coleman 0-2, I O'Sullivan 0-1, O Jordan 0-1.		N Coleman 1-1, F Twomey 1-0, T Noonan 1-0, S Noonan 0-3, J Allen 0-1.

16 September 1973 Quarter-final	Meelin	1-12 - 3-05	Courcey Rovers	Cork Athletic Grounds
	B Buckley 1-3, P Buckley 0-4, P O'Connor 0-3, K O'Sullivan 0-1, B Quinn 0-1.		C Corcoran 2-0, JJ O'Donovan 1-0, O Crowley 0-2, T Harrington 0-1, M Nolan 0-1, D O'Donovan 0-1.

30 September 1973 Quarter-final	Erin's Own	3-10 - 1-06	Blackrock	Riverstown Sportsfield
	D Buckley 1-3, K Fiiztgerald 1-0, G Holland 1-0, B Murphy 0-2, D Motherway 0-2, B Murphy 0-1, T Harris 0-1, T Aherne 0-1.		M Barry 1-0, F Delaney 0-1, J Hayes 0-1, J O'Halloran 0-1, N Kirby 0-1, P Higgins 0-1, B O'Loughlin 0-1.	Referee: O Twomey (Ballincollig)

=== Semi-finals ===
21 October 1973 Semi-final	Meelin	2-10 - 1-04	Kildorrery	Buttevant Grounds
				Referee: P Cronin (St. Finbarr's)

28 October 1973 Semi-final	Ballinhassig	3-12 - 2-07	Erin's Own	Cork Athletic Grounds
	JK Coleman 1-4, A Walsh 1-3, O Jordan 1-1, D Coleman 0-3, TF Hayes 0-1.		D Buckley 1-3, K Fitzgerald 1-0, D Motherway 0-2, B Murphy 0-2.	Referee: P Cronin (St. Finbarr's)

=== Final ===
11 November 1973 Final	Ballinhassig	1-06 - 0-05	Meelin	Coachford Sportsfield
	D Coleman 0-4, F Roche 1-0, R Crowley 0-2.		P Buckley 0-3, P McLoughlin 0-1, P O'Connor 0-1.	Referee: P Cronin (St. Finbarr's)
