= Dáire O'Leary =

Irish hurler (born 2002)

Personal information
- Native name: Dáire Ó Laoire (Irish)
- Born: 2002 (age 23–24) Watergrasshill, County Cork, Ireland
- Occupation: Garda

Sport
- Sport: Hurling
- Position: Full-back
Clubs
Years	Club	Apps (scores)
2020-present 2020-2024	Watergrasshill → Imokilly	20 (0-19); 9 (1-08)
Club titles
- Cork titles: 1
College(s)
- Years: College
- 2020-2022 2024-2026: University College Cork; Garda College
College titles
- Fitzgibbon titles: 0
Inter-county*
Years	County	Apps (scores)
2021-present	Cork	0 (0-00)
Inter-county titles
- Munster titles: 0
- All-Irelands: 0
- NHL: 0
- All Stars: 0
- *Inter County team apps and scores correct as of 21:10, 31 January 2026.

Dáire O'Leary (born 2002) is an Irish hurler who plays as a defender for club side Watergrasshill, at divisional level with Imokilly and at inter-county level with the Cork senior hurling team.

== Early life ==
Born and raised in Watergrasshill, County Cork, O'Leary played hurling to a high standard during his time as a student at St. Colman's College in Fermoy. He won a Dean Ryan Cup medal in 2017, following a 2–12 to 1–13 win over St Flannan's College in the final. He later lined out in the Dr Harty Cup.

O'Leary later lined out with University College Cork in the Fitzgibbon Cup. He later transferred to the Garda College and was part of their Ryan Cup-winning team in 2025. O'Leary was subsequently named on the Higher Education Team of the Year.

== Club career ==
O'Leary began his club career at juvenile and underage levels with the Watergrasshill club. He made his adult championship debut in August 2020. O'Leary won a Cork PIHC medal in 2024, after lining out at centre-back in the 2–16 to 0–19 win over Carrigaline in the final. He later added a Munster Club IHC title to his collection, before winning an All-Ireland Club IHC medal following a 2–15 to 0–18 defeat of Tynagh-Abbey/Duniry in the 2025 All-Ireland club final.

Performances at club level resulted in O'Leary being called up to the Imokilly divisional team. He won consecutive Denis O'Riordan Cup titles in 2023 and 2024. O'Leary was at centre-back when Imokilly beat Sarsfields by 1–23 to 0–17 to win the Cork PSHC title in 2024.

== Inter-county career ==
O'Leary first appeared on the inter-county scene with Cork as a member of the minor team during their unsuccessful Munster MHC campaign in 2019. He immediately progressed to Cork's under-20 team in 2020. Success in this grade was immediate, with O'Leary claiming Munster and All-Ireland U20HC medals in his first year on the team, following defeats of Tipperary and Dublin in the respective finals. Injury ruled him out of much of the 2021 season, however, O'Leary was listed as one of the extended panel members when Cork retained the All-Ireland U20HC title after a defeat of Galway in the 2021 All-Ireland U20HC final.

O'Leary joined the senior team as a member of the extended training panel in 2021. He was listed as a panel member for Cork's 2021 National Hurling League game against Limerick in June 2021. O'Leary continued to make a number of appearances throughout the respective National League camapigns in 2022 and 2023, however, a series of foot and groin injuries impacted his further development. He was listed as an extended panel member for Cork's 3–29 to 1–34 extra-time defeat by Clare in the 2024 All-Ireland final.

Work commitments forced O'Leary to leave the Cork panel for the 2025 season. He was recalled to the panel by new manager Ben O'Connor in October 2025.

== Career statistics ==
=== Club ===
As of 6 September 2025.

Team	Year	Cork PIHC		Munster		All-Ireland		Total	
Team	Year	Apps	Score	Apps	Score	Apps	Score	Apps	Score
Watergrasshill	2020	4	0-10	—		—		4	0-10
Watergrasshill	2021	1	0-00	—		—		1	0-00
Watergrasshill	2022	3	0-04	—		—		3	0-04
Watergrasshill	2023	3	0-02	—		—		3	0-02
Watergrasshill	2024	5	0-02	2	0-00	2	0-01	9	0-03
Watergrasshill	Total	16	0-18	2	0-00	2	0-01	20	0-19
Watergrasshill	Year	Cork SAHC		Munster		All-Ireland		Total	
Watergrasshill	Year	Apps	Score	Apps	Score	Apps	Score	Apps	Score
Watergrasshill	2025	0	0-00	—		—		0	0-00
Watergrasshill	2026	0	0-00	—		—		0	0-00
Watergrasshill	Total	0	0-00	—		—		0	0-00
Career total		16	0-18	2	0-00	2	0-01	20	0-19

=== Division ===
As of 20 October 2024.

Team	Year	Cork SHC	
Team	Year	Apps	Score
Imokilly	2020	1	0-01
Imokilly	2021	0	0-00
Imokilly	2022	0	0-00
Imokilly	2023	3	0-00
Imokilly	2024	5	1-07
Career total		9	1-08

=== Inter-county ===
As of 21 March 2026

Team	Year	National League			Munster		All-Ireland		Total	
Team	Year	Division	Apps	Score	Apps	Score	Apps	Score	Apps	Score
Cork	2021	Division 1A	0	0-00	0	0-00	0	0-00	0	0-00
Cork	2022	Division 1A	4	0-00	0	0-00	0	0-00	4	0-00
Cork	2023	Division 1A	2	0-00	0	0-00	—		2	0-00
Cork	2024	Division 1A	0	0-00	0	0-00	0	0-00	0	0-00
Cork	2025	Division 1A	—		—		—		—	
Cork	2026	Division 1A	5	0-00	0	0-00	0	0-00	5	0-00
Career total			11	0-00	0	0-00	0	0-00	11	0-00

== Honours ==
St Colman's College

- Dean Ryan Cup: 2017

Garda College

- Ryan Cup: 2025

Watergrasshill

- All-Ireland Intermediate Club Hurling Championship: 2025
- Munster Intermediate Club Hurling Championship: 2024
- Cork Premier Intermediate Hurling Championship: 2024

Imokilly

- Cork Premier Senior Hurling Championship: 2024
- Denis O'Riordan Cup: 2023, 2024

Cork

- All-Ireland Under-20 Hurling Championship: 2020, 2021
- Munster Under-20 Hurling Championship: 2020, 2021
