= 1975 Cork Intermediate Hurling Championship =

Irish hurling competition

- Dates: 13 April - 10 August 1975
- Teams: 12
- Champions: Ballinhassig (1st title)
- Runners-up: Blackrock

Tournament statistics
- Matches played: 11
- Goals scored: 56 (5.09 per match)
- Points scored: 206 (18.73 per match)
- Top scorer(s): Danny Buckley (6-05)

The 1975 Cork Intermediate Hurling Championship was the 66th staging of the Cork Intermediate Hurling Championship since its establishment by the Cork County Board in 1909. The draw for the opening round fixtures took place at the Cork Convention on 26 January 1975.

On 10 August 1975, Ballinhassig won the championship following a 3–12 to 2–05 defeat of Blackrock in the final at the Mardyke. This was their first ever championship title.

Blackrock's Danny Buckley was the championship's top scorer with 6-05.

== Team changes ==
=== To Championship ===
Promoted from the Cork Junior Hurling Championship

- Watergrasshill

=== From Championship ===
Promoted to the Cork Senior Hurling Championship

- Bandon

Regraded to the City Junior Hurling Championship

- Brian Dillons

== Results ==
=== First round ===
13 April 1975 First round	Cobh	1-11 - 1-13	Carrigtwohill	Riverstown Sportsfield
	T Meaney 1-0, M Sloane 0-3, J Ryan 0-2, S O'Connor 0-2, T McGee 0-2, J Halahane 0-1, M Feeney 0-1.		P Keane 0-4, J O'Rourke 1-0, P O'Connor 0-3, J O'Reilly 0-3, MJ Roche 0-2, M Sheehan 0-1.

20 April 1975 First round	Newcestown	6-06 - 2-02	Castletownroche	Ballinlough Grounds
	K Calnan 2-0, T Crowley 1-2, S Crowley 1-0, P Ryan 1-0, M Kehilly 1-0, K Kehilly 0-3, J O'Beirne 0-1.		W Magner 1-1, R Browne 1-0, R Magner 0-1.

27 April 1975 First round	Watergrasshill	1-07 - 4-11	Newtownshandrum	Castletownroche Grounds
	S Higgins 0-5, T O'Riordan 1-0, S O'Riordan 0-1, P O'Regan 0-1.		D Coughlan 2-1, D Herlihy 0-6, C Morrissey 1-0, M Thompson 1-0, P Herlihy 0-2, P Noonan 0-1, D Noonan 0-1.

11 May 1975 First round	Blackrock	7-11 - 2-07	St. Finbarr's	Ballinlough Grounds
	D Buckley 3-3, N Kirby 1-4, C O'Brien 2-0, G Buckley 1-2, N O'Keeffe 0-2.		C Ryan 1-1, M Archer 1-0, M Coughlan 0-2, J Murphy 0-2, H Kennedy 0-1, M O'Mahony 0-1.

=== Quarter-finals ===
27 April 1975 Quarter-final	Ballinhassig	4-10 - 3-07	Midleton	Ballinlough Grounds
	D Coleman 1-3, JL O'Sullivan 1-2, JK Coleman 1-2, F Roche 1-0, B Coleman 0-2, TF Hayes 0-2.		W Glavin 1-2, J O'Brien 1-0, S Farrell 1-0, J Hurley 0-2, B Coady 0-2, B Keane 0-1.

4 May 1975 Quarter-final	Passage	1-14 - 1-07	Ballincollig	Ballinhassig Grounds
	B Meade 0-5, G O'Sullivan 1-1, M O'Connell 0-2, D Hanlon 0-2, J O'Reill 0-1, K Keane 0-1, T Howard 0-1, P McCarthy 0-1.		B Fitton 1-0, J Lucey 0-3, P O'Connell 0-2, T Radley 0-1, N Cooney 0-1.

14 June 1975 Quarter-final	Blackrock	4-10 - 2-08	Carrigtwohill	Páirc Uí Chonaill
	J Buckley 2-1, C O'Brien 1-1, P Doyle 0-4, N O'Keeffe 0-4, D Buckley 1-0.		P Duggan 1-2, D O'Connor 1-0, M Rohan 0-3, P Keane 0-1, J O'Reilly 0-1, W Kidney 0-1.

22 June 1975 Quarter-final	Newcestown	4-13 - 3-08	Newtownshandrum	Riverstown Sportsfield
	K Calnan 2-1, M Kehilly 2-1, T Crowley 0-7, G O'Leary 0-2, P Ryan 0-1, S Crowley 0-1.		J Buckley 0-5, D Coughlan 1-0, L Bowles 1-0, C Morrissey 1-0, M Murphy 0-2, D Fehin 0-1.

=== Semi-finals ===
19 July 1975 Semi-final	Blackrock	4-11 - 1-09	Newcestown	Cloughduv Grounds
	N Kirby 3-3, D Buckley 1-1, N O'Keeffe 0-2, C O'Brien 0-2, F Delaney 0-1, P Doyle 0-1, G Buckley 0-1.		T Crowley 0-6, P Ryan 1-1, J O'Leary 0-2, A Flynn 0-1.

20 July 1975 Semi-final	Ballinhassig	1-12 - 0-12	Passage	Carrigaline Grounds
	JK Coleman 1-4, D Coleman 0-3, B Coleman 0-3, W Walsh 0-1, JL O'Sullivan 0-1.		B Meade 0-4, P McCarthy 0-3, J McCarthy 0-2, T Howard 0-1, S Meade 0-1, G O'Sullivan 0-1.

=== Final ===
10 August 1975 Final	Ballinhassig	3-12 - 2-05	Blackrock	The Mardyke
	D Coleman 1-4, W Walsh 1-1, JK Coleman 0-4, O Jordan 1-0, B Coleman 0-2, JL O'Sullivan 0-1.		D Buckley 1-1, N Kirby 1-0, N O'Keeffe 0-1, P Doyle 0-1, C O'Brien 0-1, J Delaney 0-1.

== Championship statistics ==
=== Top scorers ===
Overall

Rank	Player	Club	Tally	Total	Matches	Average
1	Danny Buckley	Blackrock	6-05	23	4	5.75
2	Ned Kirby	Blackrock	5-07	22	4	5.50
3	Tim Crowley	Newcestown	1-15	18	3	6.00
4	John Kevin Coleman	Ballinhassig	2-10	16	3	5.33
4	Derry Coleman	Ballinhassig	2-10	16	3	5.33
6	Kevin Callanan	Newcestown	4-01	13	3	4.66
6	Conor O'Brien	Blackrock	3-04	13	4	3.25
8	Donal Coughlan	Newcestown	3-01	10	2	5.00
8	Mark Kehilly	Newcestown	3-01	10	2	5.00
10	Neally O'Keeffe	Blackrock	0-09	9	4	2.25
10	Bernie Meade	Passage	0-09	9	4	2.25

In a single game

Rank	Player	Club	Tally	Total	Opposition
1	Danny Buckley	Blackrock	3-03	12	St. Finbarr's
1	Ned Kirby	Blackrock	3-03	12	Newcestown
3	Donal Coughlan	Newtownshandrum	2-01	7	Watergrasshill
3	John Buckley	Blackrock	2-01	7	Carrigtwohill
3	Kevin Callanan	Newcestown	2-01	7	Newtownshandrum
3	Mick Kehilly	Newcestown	2-01	7	Newtownshandrum
3	Ned Kirby	Blackrock	1-04	7	St. Finbarr's
3	John Kevin Coleman	Ballinhassig	1-04	7	Passage
3	Derry Coleman	Ballinhassig	1-04	7	Blackrock
3	Tim Crowley	Newcestown	0-07	7	Newtownshandrum
