= 1954 Cork Junior Hurling Championship =

Irish hurling competition

- Teams: 7
- Champions: Castlemagner (1st title)
- Runners-up: Ballinhassig

The 1954 Cork Junior Hurling Championship was the 57th staging of the Cork Junior Hurling Championship since its establishment by the Cork County Board in 1895.

The final was played on 7 November 1954 at the Athletic Grounds in Cork, between Castlemagner and Ballinhassig, in what was their first ever meeting in the final. Castlemagner won the match by 3-08 to 4-04 to claim their first ever championship title. It was the first time that a club from the Duhallow division won the title.

== Results ==
=== Final ===
7 November 1954 Final	Castlemagner	3-08 - 4-04	Ballinhassig	Cork Athletic Grounds
