= Brian Keating (hurler) =

Irish hurler

Personal information
- Native name: Brian Ó Céitinn (Irish)
- Born: 2003 (age 22–23) Ballincollig, County Cork, Ireland
- Occupation: Student

Sport
- Sport: Hurling
- Position: Midfield
Club*
Years	Club	Apps (scores)
2021-present	Ballincollig	20 (7-72)
Club titles
- Cork titles: 0
College
- Years: College
- 2022-present: University College Cork
College titles
- Fitzgibbon titles: 0
Inter-county**
Years	County	Apps (scores)
2026-	Cork	0 (0-00)
Inter-county titles
- Munster titles: 0
- All-Irelands: 0
- NHL: 0
- All Stars: 0
- * club appearances and scores correct as of 21:47, 31 January 2026. **Inter County team apps and scores correct as of 21:08, 31 January 2026.

Brian Keating (born 2003) is an Irish hurler and Gaelic footballer. At club level, he plays with Ballincollig and at inter-county level with the Cork senior hurling team.

== Career ==
Keating played hurling at all grades as a student at Christian Brothers College in Cork. He was part of the school's senior hurling team that beat Gaelcholáiste Mhuire AG to win the Dr O'Callaghan Cup in 2022. He later lined out with University College Cork in the Fitzgibbon Cup. At club level with Ballincollig, Keating has played as a dual player with the club's top adult teams.

Keating first appeared on the inter-county scene for Cork as a member of the minor team beaten by Limerick in the 2020 Munster MHC semi-final. He immediately progressed to the Cork under-20 team and won an All-Ireland U20HC title, albeit as a member of the extended panel, following a 4–19 to 2–14 defeat of Galway in the 2021 All-Ireland U20HC final. Keating claimed a second All-Ireland U20HC title in three seasons in his third and final year with the team in 2023.

Keating was drafted onto the extended panel of the senior team in advance of the 2026 National Hurling League.

== Career statistics ==
=== Club ===
As of 19 October 2025

Team	Year	Cork PIHC	
Team	Year	Apps	Score
Ballincollig	2021	3	0-10
Ballincollig	2022	3	2-19
Ballincollig	2023	4	2-09
Ballincollig	2024	4	1-07
Ballincollig	2025	6	2-27
Total		20	7-72

=== Inter-county ===
As of 31 January 2026

Team	Year	National League			Munster		All-Ireland		Total	
Team	Year	Division	Apps	Score	Apps	Score	Apps	Score	Apps	Score
Cork	2026	Division 1A	1	0-00	0	0-00	0	0-00	1	0-00
Career total			1	0-00	0	0-00	0	0-00	1	0-00

== Honours ==
Christian Brothers College

- Dr O'Callaghan Cup: 2022

Cork

- All-Ireland Under-20 Hurling Championship: 2021, 2023
- Munster Under-20 Hurling Championship: 2021, 2023
