= 2025 Cork Premier Intermediate Hurling Championship =

Annual hurling competition season

- Dates: 31 July - 19 October 2025
- Teams: 12
- Sponsor: Co-Op Superstores
- Champions: Ballinhassig (3rd title); Ger Collins (captain); John O'Sullivan (manager)
- Runners-up: Ballincollig; Cian Dorgan (captain); Éamonn Keating (manager)
- Relegated: Mallow

Tournament statistics
- Matches played: 24
- Goals scored: 66 (2.75 per match)
- Points scored: 833 (34.71 per match)
- Top scorer(s): Ger Collins (4-38)

The 2025 Cork Premier Intermediate Hurling Championship was the 22nd staging of the Cork Premier Intermediate Hurling Championship since its establishment by the Cork County Board in 2004. The draw for the group stage placings took place on 10 December 2024. The championship ran from 31 July to 19 October 2025.

The final was played on 19 October 2025 at SuperValu Páirc Uí Chaoimh in Cork, between Ballinhassig and Ballincollig, in what was their first ever meeting in the final. Ballinhassig won the match by 2-22 to 1-19 to claim their a record third championship title overall and a first championship title in 13 years.

Ballinhassig's Ger Collins was the championship's top scorer with 4-38.

== Team changes ==
=== To Championship ===
Relegated from the Cork Senior A Hurling Championship

- Cloyne

Promoted from the Cork Intermediate A Hurling Championship

- Lisgoold

=== From Championship ===
Promoted to the Cork Senior A Hurling Championship

- Watergrasshill

Relegated to the Cork Intermediate A Hurling Championship

- Aghabullogue

== Group A ==
=== Group A table ===
Quarter-finalist

Team	Matches				Score			Pts
Team	Pld	W	D	L	For	Against	Diff	Pts
Cloyne	3	2	0	1	60	61	-1	4
Carrigaline	3	2	0	1	72	66	6	4
Ballymartle	3	1	0	2	55	58	-3	2
Éire Óg	3	1	0	2	63	65	-2	2

=== Group A results ===
2 August 2025 Round 1	Ballymartle	1-17 - 2-12	Éire Óg	Ballinhassig Grounds
	R Deasy 0-7 (0-6 f), L O’Callaghan 0-4, E Healy 1-0, C Lordan, J Dwyer, D Casey, S Dorney, S Cummins, R Cahalane 0-1 each.	Report	E O’Shea 1-7 (1-6 f, 0-1 ’65), M Kelleher 1-0, J Galvin 0-3, K Hallissey, D Healy 0-1 each.

3 August 2025 Round 1	Carrigaline	1-19 - 3-16	Cloyne	Páirc Uí Chonaill
	B Kelleher 0-10 (0-6 f, 0-1 65), R McCarthy 1-3, E Desmond 0-4, K Kavanagh, D Drake 0-1 each.	Report	B O’Shea 1-5 (1-0 pen, 0-3 f), B Walsh 1-1, D Byrne 0-4, S Beausang 1-0, J O’Brien, C Cahill 0-2 each, P O’Sullivan, A Walsh 0-1 each.

15 August 2025 Round 2	Éire Óg	1-19 - 1-27	Carrigaline	Cloughduv Grounds
	E O’Shea 0-7 (0-5 f, 0-1 65), J Galvin 1-2, L Considine, K Hallissey 0-3 each, D Healy 0-2, C O’Callaghan, O O’Shea 0-1 each.	Report	B Kelleher 0-9 (8f), R O’Shea 0-5, E Desmond, D Drake 0-3 each, K O'Reilly 1-0, C Kearney (0-1 sl), R Kelleher, F O’Connell 0-2 each, K Kavanagh 0-1.

16 August 2025 Round 2	Cloyne	3-11 - 0-16	Ballymartle	O'Connell Park
	Cloyne: N Cahill, S Beausang M Cahill 1-0 each B O'Shea 0-7 (0-2f), A Walsh 0-2, C Cahill, C Mullins 0-1 each.	Report	R Deasy 0-11 (0-5f), L O'Callaghan, C Lordan 0-2 each, S Cummins 0-1.

7 September 2025 Round 3	Carrigaline	0-20 - 1-16	Ballymartle	Minane Bridge Grounds
	B Kelleher 0-8 (3f, 1 65); E Desmond 0-5, D Drake 0-3, F O’Connell, H Andrews, R Kelleher and D Greene 0-1 each.	Report	R Deasy 0-12 (11f); L O’Callaghan 1-2, B Corry, F Desmond 0-1 each.

7 September 2025 Round 3	Cloyne	0-15 - 3-14	Éire Óg	Mayfield Grounds
	B O’Shea (0-8, 5f, 1 65), N Cahill (0-4), C Mullins, M Cahill and J O’Brien (0-1 each).	Report	C O’Callaghan and O O’Shea (1-2 each), E O’Shea (0-5, 3f), D Healy (1-0), D Casey (0-2), C McGoldrick, K Hallissey, and D Foley (0-1 each).

== Group B ==
=== Group B table ===
Semi-finalist Quarter-finalist Relegation playoff

Team	Matches				Score			Pts
Team	Pld	W	D	L	For	Against	Diff	Pts
Ballinhassig	3	2	0	1	64	61	3	4
Ballincollig	3	2	0	1	79	58	21	4
Kilworth	3	1	0	2	55	65	-10	2
Castlemartyr	3	1	0	2	59	73	-14	2

=== Group B results ===
31 July 2025 Round 1	Castlemartyr	1-15 - 1-18	Kilworth	Club Áras
	M Kelly 0-6 (0-4 f, 0-1 65), B McGann 1-0, C Joyce 0-2, J Stack, B Lawton, D Joyce, M O’Dwyer, B Ó Tuama, E Martin, C Whyte 0-1 each.	Report	L Óg Hegarty 0-8 (0-5 f, 0-1 65), E Carey 0-4 (0-1 sl), J Sheehan 1-1, M Sheehan 0-3, B Sheehan, C Donnellan 0-1 each.

1 August 2025 Round 1	Ballincollig	0-19 - 4-13	Ballinhassig	Church Road
	S Wills 0-16 (0-13 f), B Keating, C O’Driscoll, M Oldham 0-1 each.	Report	G Collins 2-7 (0-5 f, 0-2 65, 1-0 pen), E Cullinane 2-1, A O’Sullivan 0-4, B Lynch 0-1.

16 August 2025 Round 2	Kilworth	1-14 - 2-23	Ballincollig	Páirc Bhríde
	L Óg Hegarty 1-7 (1-0 pen, 0-7 f), J Sheehan, M Sheehan, E Carey 0-2 each, N McNamara, L Whelan 0-1 each.	Report	S Wills 0-9 (0-7 f), C O’Driscoll 1-2, M Oldham 0-4, A Wills 1-1, B Keating, T Morgan, D O’Sullivan 0-2 each, T O’Connell 0-1.

17 August 2025 Round 2	Ballinhassig	2-15 - 2-19	Castlemartyr	Páirc Uí Rinn
	G Collins 1-6 (1-4 f), B Lawton 1-0 (og), B Lynch 0-3, C Grainger, J Grainger 0-2 each, D O’Sullivan, A O’Sullivan 0-1 each.	Report	M Kelly 0-12 f, J McGann 1-2, B McGann 1-0, C Joyce, J Stack 0-2 each, D Joyce 0-1 f.

7 September 2025 Round 3	Ballincollig	3-22 - 0-16	Castlemartyr	Páirc Séamus de Barra
	C O’Driscoll 2-1, B Keating 1-4 (1-0 pen, 0-1f), B Coleman, A Wills 0-3 each, C Dorgan, T Morgan, S Wills, M Oldham 0-2 each, T O’Connell, D O’Sullivan, C Dalton 0-1 each.	Report	M Kelly 0-8 (3f), Billy Mc Gann 0-3, J Stack, C Joyce, D Joyce (2f) 0-2 each, L Martin 0-1.

7 September 2025 Round 3	Ballinhassig	0-18 - 0-17	Kilworth	Páirc Bhríde
	G Collins 0-9, D O'Sullivan 0-4, F O'Leary 0-3, J O'Callaghan 0-1, T Madden 0-1.		L Óg Hegarty 0-6, N McNamara 0-5, J Sheehan 0-2, E Carey 0-2, W Condon 0-1, P Riordan 0-1.

== Group C ==
=== Group C table ===
Semi-finalist Quarter-finalist Relegation playoff

Team	Matches				Score			Pts
Team	Pld	W	D	L	For	Against	Diff	Pts
Dungourney	3	3	0	0	81	62	19	6
Valley Rovers	3	2	0	1	63	63	0	4
Lisgoold	3	1	0	2	72	78	-6	2
Mallow	3	0	0	3	67	80	-13	0

=== Group C results ===
2 August 2025 Round 1	Lisgoold	1-18 - 2-18	Valley Rovers	Carrigaline Grounds
	J O’Driscoll 1-3, L O’Shea 0-6 (0-4 f), M Hegarty 0-4 (0-1 f), D Healy 0-3, J O’Leary, K Cashman 0-1 each.	Report	C O’Leary 0-9 (0-7 f), R O’Sullivan 1-3, S Ryan 1-1, E Crowley 0-3, S McEntee 0-1, E Guinane 0-1f.

3 August 2025 Round 1	Dungourney	3-21 - 1-19	Mallow	Castletownroche Grounds
	J Leahy 0-10 (0-3 f), J Ahern 1-3, S Hegarty, C O’Callaghan 1-1 each, M Leahy 0-2, N Motherway, N McGrath, B Forbes, R Harney 0-1 each.	Report	M Tobin (0-4 f), P Herlihy 0-5 each, K Sheehan, P Healy 0-3 each, D Hayes 1-0, L Buckley 0-2, P Lyons 0-1 65.

17 August 2025 Round 2	Mallow	4-14 - 3-18	Lisgoold	Castlelyons Grounds
	M Tobin 1-7 (0-6 f), P Lyons 1-4, S Hayes 1-1 (1-0 f), P Herlihy 1-0, P Healy 0-2.	Report	L O’Shea 1-8 (1-0 pen, 0-4 f), M Hegarty 1-3 (0-2 f, 0-1 65), C Hickey 1-0, D Healy, J Cashman 0-3 each, L Walsh 0-1.

17 August 2025 Round 2	Valley Rovers	1-13 - 3-14	Dungourney	Blarney Grounds
	C O’Leary 0-6 (0-5 f), C Taheny 1-2, S Ryan 0-2, E Crowley, M Woods, H O’Sullivan 0-1 each.	Report	J Leahy 0-8 (0-6 f), C O’Callaghan 2-0, J Ahern 1-2 (1-0 pen), N McGrath, B Forbes, N Motherway, J McCarthy 0-1 each.

7 September 2025 Round 3	Dungourney	0-28 - 1-21	Lisgoold	Castlelyons Grounds
	J Leahy 0-11 (0-4 f), M Leahy, S Hegarty 0-4 each, J Ahern 0-3, C O'Callaghan, C Murphy 0-2 each, N McGrath, N Motherway 0-1 each.	Report	D Healy 1-7, L O'Shea 0-7 (0-3 f), J Cashman, C Hickey, M Hegarty 0-2 each, K Cashman 0-1.

7 September 2025 Round 3	Mallow	0-19 - 0-23	Valley Rovers	Páirc Uí Rinn
	S Hayes 0-11 (0-7 f, 0-2 65), P Lyons, M Tobin 0-2 each, P Herlihy, K Sheehan, R Sheehan, D Sheehan 0-1 each.	Report	C O’Leary 0-11 (0-7 f), B McCarthy, S Ryan, J Walsh, J Kiely 0-2 each, H O’Sullivan, E Crowley, C Butler, S McEntee 0-1 each.

== Relegation stage ==
=== Relegation playoff ===
20 September 2025 Playoff	Castlemartyr	1-19 - 0-19	Mallow	Glanworth Grounds
	M Kelly (0-8, 4 frees); B Lawton, J Stack (0-4 each); E Martin (1-0); C Joyce, B McGann, J McGann (0-1 each).	Report	S Hayes (0-10, 5 frees, 2 65s); P Healy (0-3); P Lyons, M Tobin (0-2 each); L Buckley, D Sheehan (0-1 each).

== Knockout stage ==
=== Bracket ===
Quarter-Finals
Carrigaline (Carrigdhoun)	1–09
Ballincollig (Muskerry)	1–21
Cloyne (Imokilly)	1–18
Valley Rovers (Carrigdhoun)	0–20

Semi-Finals
Dungourney (Imokilly)	0–17
Ballincollig (Muskerry)	3–13
Ballinhassig (Carrigdhoun)	3–15
Cloyne (Imokilly)	2–14

Final
Ballincollig (Muskerry)	1–19
Ballinhassig (Carrigdhoun)	2–22

=== Quarter-finals ===
21 September 2025 Quarter-final	Carrigaline	1-09 - 1-21	Ballincollig	Riverstick Grounds
	B Kelleher 0-7 (0-5 f, 0-1 65), K O’Reilly 1-0, E Desmond, D Drake 0-1 each.	Report	B Keating 1-11 (0-9 f), D O’Sullivan 0-4 (0-1 f), M Oldham 0-2, B Coleman, T Morgan, C Dorgan, C O’Driscoll 0-1 each.

21 September 2025 Quarter-final	Cloyne	1-18 - 0-20	Valley Rovers	Páirc Uí Chonaill
	M O’Brien 0-7 (0-6 f, 0-1 65), C Cahill 0-5, B O’Shea 0-4 (0-1 65), N Cahill 1-0, E Motherway, M Cahill 0-1 each.	Report	C Butler 0-8 f, E Crowley 0-6, J Kenneally, S Ryan 0-2 each, J Walsh, A Kenneally 0-1 each.

=== Semi-finals ===
4 October 2025 Semi-final	Dungourney	0-17 - 3-13	Ballincollig	Caherlag Grounds
	J Leahy 0-7 (6f), J Ahern (2f) 0-3, N Motherway 0-2, B Forbes, M Leahy, S Hegarty, C O’Callaghan, R Denny 0-1 each.	Report	D O’Mahony, A Wills 1-1 each, C Dorgan 1-0, B Keating 0-5 (5f), S O’Neill, D O’Sullivan (1f) 0-2 each, C O’Driscoll, T Morgan 0-1 each.

4 October 2025 Semi-final	Ballinhassig	3-15 - 2-14	Cloyne	Ovens Grounds
	S McCarthy 1-3, G Collins 0-5 (0-2 f, 0-1 65), S Lombard, J O’Callaghan 1-0 each, F O’Leary 0-2, P Collins (f), C Grainger, C Desmond, J Grainger, M Collins 0-1 each.	Report	J O’Brien 0-9 (0-8 f), I Cahill, K Dennehy 1-0 each, Éanna Motherway 0-2, C Cahill, B O’Shea, N Cahill 0-1 each.

=== Final ===
19 October 2025 Final	Ballincollig	1-19 - 2-22	Ballinhassig	SuperValu Páirc Ui Chaoimh
	S Wills 1-10 (1-7 f), B Keating 0-5, S O’Neill 0-3, T Morgan 0-1.	Report	G Collins 1-11 (0-7 f, 0-2 65, 1-0 pen), C Desmond 1-2, E Cullinane 0-3, P Collins (f), D O’Sullivan, M Collins, S McCarthy, S Lombard, F O’Leary 0-1 each.	Referee: P O'Mahony (Kilbrittain)

== Championship statistics ==
=== Top scorers ===
Overall

Rank	Player	Club	Tally	Total	Matches	Average
1	Ger Collins	Ballinhassig	4-38	50	5	10.00
2	Stephen Wills	Ballincollig	1-37	40	4	10.00
3	Jack Leahy	Dungourney	0-36	36	4	8.00
4	Brian Kelleher	Carrigaline	0-34	34	4	8.50
4	Mike Kelly	Castlemartyr	0-34	34	4	8.50
6	Brian Keating	Ballincollig	2-27	33	6	5.50
7	Ryan Deasy	Ballymartle	0-30	30	3	10.00
8	Brian O'Shea	Cloyne	1-25	28	5	6.75
9	Chris O'Leary	Valley Rovers	0-26	26	3	8.66
10	Seán Hayes	Mallow	1-22	25	3	8.33

Single game

Rank	Player	Club	Tally	Total	Opposition
1	Stephen Wills	Ballincollig	0-16	16	Ballinhassig
2	Brian Keating	Ballincollig	1-11	14	Carrigaline
2	Ger Collins	Ballinhassig	1-11	14	Ballincollig
4	Ger Collins	Ballinhassig	2-07	13	Ballincollig
4	Stephen Wills	Ballincollig	1-10	13	Ballinhassig
6	Mike Kelly	Castlemartyr	0-12	12	Ballinhassig
6	Ryan Deasy	Ballymartle	0-12	12	Carrigaline
8	Liam O'Shea	Lisgoold	1-08	11	Mallow
8	Ryan Deasy	Ballymartle	0-11	11	Éire Óg
8	Chris O'Leary	Valley Rovers	0-11	11	Mallow
8	Seán Hayes	Mallow	0-11	11	Valley Rovers
8	Jack Leahy	Dungourney	0-11	11	Lisgoold

=== Miscellaneous ===
- The quarter-final between Cloyne and Valley Rovers was abandoned after three minutes, due to Valley Rovers' full-back John Cottrell suffering a serious leg injury. The match was refixed for the following day.
- Ballihassig's Fintan O'Leary became the first player win three Cork PIHC medals.
