= Liam Hayes (hurler) =

Irish hurler (born 1974)

Personal information
- Native name: Liam Ó hAodha (Irish)
- Born: 1974 (age 51–52) Dromina, County Cork, Ireland

Sport
- Sport: Hurling
- Position: Full-back
Clubs
- Years: Club
- Dromina; Avondhu
Club titles
- Cork titles: 1
Inter-county*
Years	County	Apps (scores)
1998-2007	Cork (intermediate)	15 (0-00)
- *Inter County team apps and scores correct as of 18:45, 28 July 2015.

Liam Hayes (born 1974) is an Irish retired hurler who played as a full-back for the Cork intermediate team.

Born in Dromina, County Cork, Hayes first arrived on the inter-county scene at the age of twenty-four when he first linked up with the Cork intermediate team. Although he never played senior hurling for Cork, Hayes won two All-Ireland medals and three Munster medal in the intermediate grade.

At club level Hayes is a one-time championship medallist with Avondhu. He also won a championship medal in the junior grade with Dromina.

In retirement from playing Hayes has become involved in team management and coaching. As manager of the Cork intermediate team he guided them to All-Ireland and Munster titles. Hayes later served as a selector with the Cork under-21 team.

== Honours ==
=== Player ===
Dromina

- Cork Junior Hurling Championship (1): 2003

Avondhu

- Cork Senior Hurling Championship (1): 1996

Cork

- All-Ireland Intermediate Hurling Championship (2): 2001, 2004
- Munster Intermediate Hurling Championship (3): 2000, 2001, 2004

=== Manager ===
Cork

- All-Ireland Intermediate Hurling Championship (1): 2014
- Munster Intermediate Hurling Championship (1): 2014

Sporting positions
Preceded by Pat Kenneally	Cork Intermediate Hurling Manager; 2011-2014	Succeeded by Ronan Dwane
Achievements
Preceded by Michael Ryan (Tipperary)	All-Ireland Intermediate Hurling Final winning manager 2014	Succeeded by Incumbent
