= 2003 Cork Junior A Hurling Championship =

- Dates: 21 September – 16 November 2003
- Teams: 7
- Sponsor: TSB Bank
- Champions: Dromina (1st title); Donal O'Shaughnessy (captain); Simon Morrissey (manager)
- Runners-up: Argideen Rangers; Michael Walsh (captain)

Tournament statistics
- Matches played: 7
- Goals scored: 15 (2.14 per match)
- Points scored: 150 (21.43 per match)
- Top scorer(s): Martin Finn (1–23)

The 2003 Cork Junior A Hurling Championship was the 106th staging of the Cork Junior A Hurling Championship since its establishment by the Cork County Board in 1895. The championship ran from 21 September to 16 November 2003.

The final was played on 16 November 2003 at Páirc Uí Chaoimh in Cork, between Dromina and Argideen Rangers, in what was their first ever meeting in the final. Dromina won the match by 2–13 to 0–09 to claim their first ever championship title.

Dromina's Martin Finn was the championship's top scorer with 1–23.

== Qualification ==
Division	Championship	Champions
Avondhu	North Cork Junior A Hurling Championship	Dromina
Carbery	South West Junior A Hurling Championship	Argideen Rangers
Carrigdhoun	South East Junior A Hurling Championship	Carrigaline
Duhallow	Duhallow Junior A Hurling Championship	Kanturk
Imokilly	East Cork Junior A Hurling Championship	Watergrasshill
Muskerry	Grenagh	Cloughduv
Seandún	City Junior A Hurling Championship	Blackrock

== Results ==
=== First round ===
21 September 2003 First round	Argideen Rangers	3-11 - 2-11	Blackrock	Minane Bridge
	M O'Rourke 2-1, M Walsh 1-3, S O'Mahony 0-5, M O'Callaghan 0-1, T Crowley 0-1.		E Kiely 1-6, J Young 1-1, I Walsh 0-3, K O'Connell 0-1.

28 September 2003 First round	Dromina	0-15 - 1-07	Watergrasshill	Kildorrery
	M Finn 0-8, P Gould 0-3, J Delee 0-1, J Finn 0-1, J Hamilton 0-1, G Hayes 0-1.		E O'Reilly 1-2, P O'Regan 0-3, P Cahill 0-2.

18 October 2003 First round	Grenagh	1-09 - 0-09	Carrigaline	Páirc Uí Rinn
	G Russell 1-1, T Kenny 0-3, D Dorgan 0-3, S Coleman 0-1, J O'Neill 0-1.		B Hogan 0-4, B O'Driscoll 0-2, P Murphy 0-2, N Murphy 0-1.

=== Semi-finals ===
4 October 2003 Semi-final	Dromina	2-13 - 2-10	Kanturk	Fr. Con Buckley Park
	M Finn 1-8, G Buckley 1-0, P Hayes 0-3, D Morrissey 0-1, J Finn 0-1.		B Mullins 2-0, F Bowen 0-6, A Nash 0-2, J O'Connell 0-1, J Murphy 0-1.

26 October 2003 Semi-final	Argideen Rangers	2-07 - 0-13	Grenagh	Brinny Sportsfield
	M Walsh 2-4, M O'Callaghan 0-1, B Harte 0-1, N Coomey 0-1.		D Dorgan 0-6, T Kenny 0-2, A O'Neill 0-2, J Russell 0-1, P McDonnell 0-1, D Day 0-1.

2 November 2003 Semi-final replay	Argideen Rangers	0-12 - 0-11 (aet)	Grenagh	Brinny Sportsfield
	S O'Mahony 0-5, N Coomey 0-2, M O'Callaghan 0-2, B Harte 0-1, T Crowley 0-1, M Walsh 0-1.		D Dorgan 0-7, T Kenny 0-2, G Russell 0-1, S Coleman 0-1.

=== Final ===
16 November 2003 Final	Dromina	2-13 - 0-09	Argideen Rangers	Páirc Uí Chaoimh
	M Finn 0-7, G Hayes 1-2, G Buckley 1-1, J Finn 0-2, Donal Morrissey 0-1.		S O'Mahony 0-3, M Walsh 0-3, B Harte 0-1, M O'Callaghan 0-1, T Crowley 0-1.

== Championship statistics ==
=== Top scorers ===
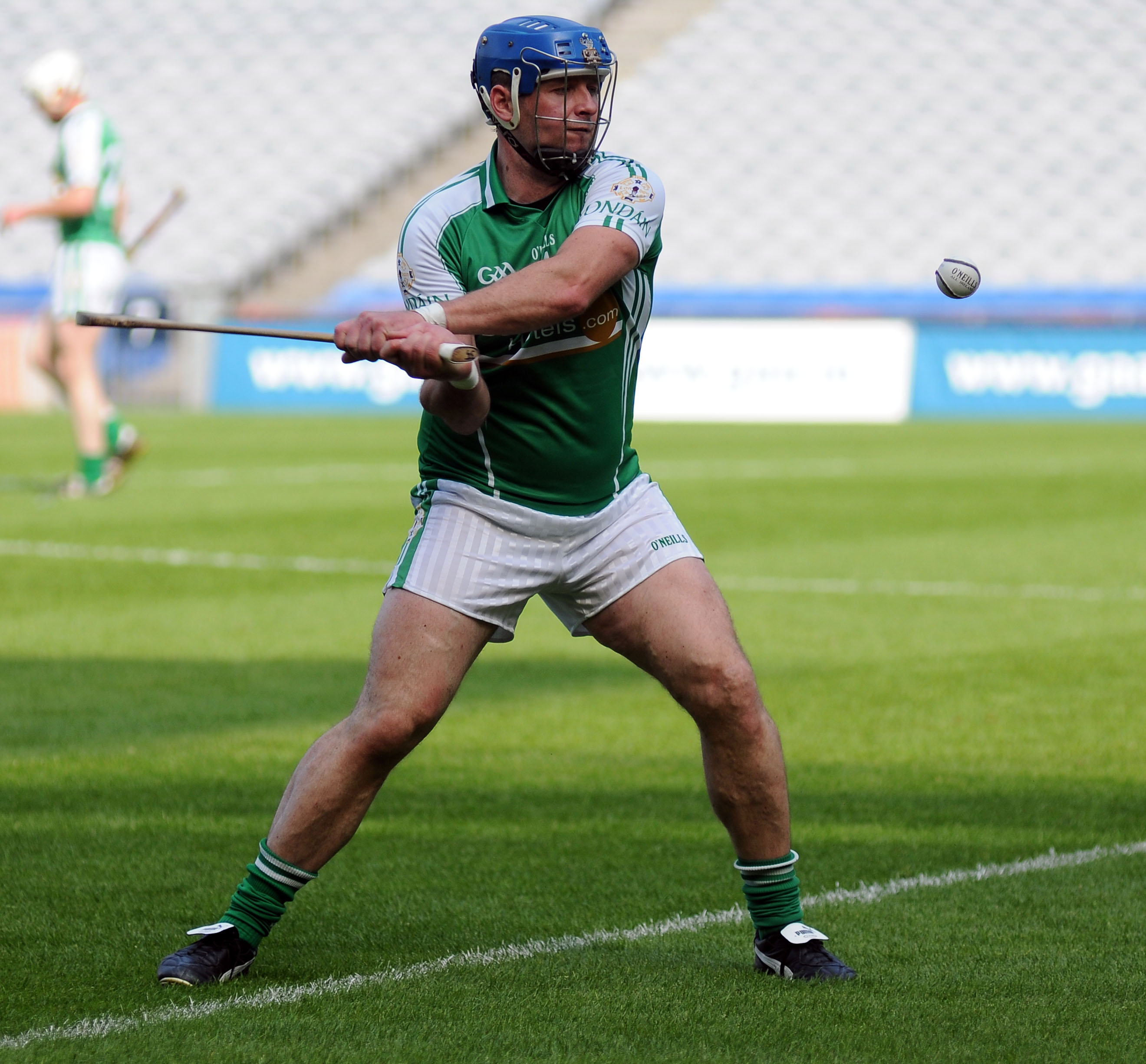
Dromina's Martin Finn scored 1-23 during the championship.

Rank	Player	Club	Tally	Total	Matches	Average
1	Martin Finn	Dromina	1-23	26	3	8.66
2	Michael Walsh	Argideen Rangers	3-11	20	4	5.00
3	Diarmuid Dorgan	Grenagh	0-16	16	3	5.33
4	Shane O'Mahony	Argideen Rangers	0-13	13	4	3.25
5	Enda Kiely	Blackrock	1-06	9	1	9.00
6	Gerard Hayes	Dromina	2-02	8	3	2.66
7	Michael O'Rourke	Argideen Rangers	2-01	7	4	1.75
7	Ger Buckley	Dromina	2-01	7	3	2.33
7	Tom Kenny	Grenagh	0-07	7	3	2.33
10	Brendan Malone	Kanturk	2-00	6	1	6.00
10	Fergus Browne	Kanturk	0-06	6	1	6.00
