= 2022 Cork Premier Intermediate Hurling Championship =

- Dates: 29 July - 22 October 2022
- Teams: 12
- Sponsor: Co-Op Superstores
- Champions: Inniscarra (1st title); Owen McCarthy (captain); Paul McCarthy (manager)
- Runners-up: Castlemartyr; Daragh Moran (captain); Brian Lawton (captain); Séamus Lawton (manager)
- Relegated: Youghal

Tournament statistics
- Matches played: 25
- Goals scored: 57 (2.28 per match)
- Points scored: 800 (32 per match)
- Top scorer(s): Mike Kelly (1-64)

The 2022 Cork Premier Intermediate Hurling Championship was the 19th staging of the Cork Premier Intermediate Hurling Championship since its establishment by the Cork County Board in 2004. The draw for the group stage placings took place on 8 February 2022. The championship ran from 29 July and 22 October 2022.

The final replay was played on 22 October 2022 at Páirc Uí Chaoimh in Cork, between Inniscarra and Castlemartyr, in what was their first ever meeting in the final. Inniscarra won the match by 3-12 to 1-17 to claim their first ever championship title.

Castlemartyr's Mike Kelly was the championship's top scorer with 1-64.

== Team changes ==
=== To Championship ===
Relegated from the Cork Senior A Hurling Championship

- Bandon

Promoted from the Cork Intermediate A Hurling Championship

- Castlemartyr

=== From Championship ===
Promoted to the Cork Senior A Hurling Championship

- Courcey Rovers

Relegated to the Cork Intermediate A Hurling Championship

- Aghada

== Group A ==
=== Group A table ===
Advance to knockout stage Advance to relegation play-off

| Team | Matches | | | | Score | | | Pts |
| Team | Pld | W | D | L | For | Against | Diff | Pts |
|---|---|---|---|---|---|---|---|---|
| Castlelyons | 3 | 2 | 1 | 0 | 46 | 40 | 8 | 5 |
| Carrigaline | 3 | 1 | 1 | 1 | 51 | 49 | 2 | 3 |
| Watergrasshill | 3 | 0 | 3 | 0 | 48 | 48 | 0 | 3 |
| Éire Óg | 3 | 0 | 1 | 2 | 48 | 48 | -10 | 1 |

=== Group A results ===
| 30 July 2022 Round 1 | Castlelyons | 0-14 - 0-09 | Carrigaline | Páirc Lios gCúl |
| | A Fenton 0-10 (0-8 f), A Spillane, N O'Leary, J Kearney, E Maye 0-1 each. | Report | B Kelleher 0-7 (0-5 f), E Desmond, D Drake 0-1 each. | Referee: P O'Mahony (Inniscarra) |

| 30 July 2022 Round 1 | Éire Óg | 2-10 - 0-16 | Watergrasshill | Blarney Grounds |
| | K Hallisey 0-5 f, J Cooper 1-2, C O’Callaghan 1-0, L Considine 0-2, D Foley, S Desmond 0-1 each. | Report | P O’Regan 0-5 f, B Lehane, S Desmond, A Cronin 0-2 each, D O’Leary, P O’Leary (f), J Gowen, C Cronin 0-1 each. | Referee: A O'Connor (Ballygarvan) |

| 5 August 2022 Round 2 | Castlelyons | 0-14 - 0-14 | Watergrasshill | Bride Rovers Park |
| | A Fenton 0-7 (0-4 f, 0-1 65), A Spillane 0-2, D Morrison, C Spillane, J Kearney, C Barry, N O’Leary 0-1 each. | Report | P O’Regan 0-6 (0-4 f), S Desmond 0-3, D O’Leary 0-2, R Murray, J Gowen, A Foley (1f), 0-1 each. | Referee: D Copps (Ballyhea) |

| 6 August 2022 Round 2 | Éire Óg | 0-17 - 1-21 | Carrigaline | Ballinghassig Grounds |
| | K Hallissey 0-9 (0-5 f, 0-1 65), C O’Callaghan 0-5, J Cooper, J Sheehan, B Hurley, R O’Toole 0-1 each. | Report | B Kelleher 1-7 (1-0 pen, 0-2 f), E Desmond 0-9, C Vaughan 0-2, P Mellet, N O’Keeffe, R O’Shea 0-1 each. | Referee: W Wallis (Aghada) |

| 28 August 2022 Round 3 | Castlelyons | 1-15 - 1-12 | Éire Óg | Páirc Uí Rinn |
| | A Fenton 0-9 (0-5f, 0-2f), J Kearney 1-1, E Maye, B Murphy 0-2 each, C Spillane 0-1. | Report | D Coakley 1-1, K Hallissey 0-3 (0-1f, 0-1 65), C O’Callaghan, D Dineen 0-2 each, D Foley, R O’Toole, J Cooper, D Desmond (0-1f) 0-1 each. | Referee: C Dineen (Douglas) |

| 28 August 2022 Round 3 | Carrigaline | 1-15 - 2-12 | Watergrasshill | Blarney Sportsfield |
| | B Kelleher 1-2 (0-2 f), R O Shea 0-3, F O Connell, E Desmond, R Kelleher 0-2 each, N Coleman, R McCarthy, D Drake, K Kavanagh 0-1 each. | Report | P O'Regan 0-7 (0-5 f), A Foley 1-0 pen, B Lehane 1-0, S Desmond 0-3, D O Leary, A Cronin 0-1 each. | Referee: J McEvoy (Blarney) |

== Group B ==
=== Group B table ===
Advance to knockout stage Advance to relegation play-off

| Team | Matches | | | | Score | | | Pts |
| Team | Pld | W | D | L | For | Against | Diff | Pts |
|---|---|---|---|---|---|---|---|---|
| Inniscarra | 3 | 2 | 1 | 0 | 71 | 43 | 28 | 5 |
| Bandon | 3 | 2 | 0 | 1 | 62 | 54 | 8 | 4 |
| Valley Rovers | 3 | 1 | 1 | 1 | 50 | 43 | 7 | 3 |
| Youghal | 3 | 0 | 0 | 3 | 37 | 80 | -43 | 0 |

=== Group B results ===
| 29 July 2022 Round 1 | Bandon | 1-15 - 0-14 | Valley Rovers | Páirc Naomh Eoin |
| | C Long 0-7 (0-5 f), M Cahalane 0-4, C Lynch 1-0, D Crowley 0-3, E McSweeney, D O’Donovan 0-1 each. | Report | C Butler 0-11 (0-9 f), E O’Reilly 0-2, A Kenneally 0-1. | Referee: B Murphy (Carrigtwohill) |

| 30 July 2022 Round 1 | Youghal | 0-15 - 3-19 | Inniscarra | Riverstown Sportsfield |
| | D O’Donoghue 0-8 (0-7f), O Hill 0-2, S Smiddy 0-2, B Moloney, J O’Mahony, N Roche 0-1 each. | Report | O McCarthy 1-7 (0-5 f, 0-1 65), D O’Keeffe 1-3, C Casey 0-4, S O’Donoghue 1-0, K Rice 0-2, J Enright 0-2f, D O’Connell 0-1. | Referee: A Hyland (Kilworth) |

| 5 August 2022 Round 2 | Bandon | 0-12 - 3-18 | Inniscarra | Cloughduv Grounds |
| | C Long 0-9 (0-8 f, 0-1 65), M Cahalane 0-2, D Crowley 0-1. | Report | S O’Donoghue 2-1, C Casey 1-3, O McCarthy 0-6 (0-1 f), D O’Keefe 0-5, J Enright, D O’Connell, S O’Mahony 0-1 each. | Referee: L O'Riordan (Belgooly) |

| 5 August 2022 Round 2 | Valley Rovers | 1-17 - 0-09 | Youghal | Erin's Own Grounds |
| | C Butler 0-12 (0-10 f), C Desmond 1-0, A Kenneally 0-2, E O’Shea, J Cottrell, E O’Reilly 0-1 each. | Report | D O’Donoghue 0-4 f, B Moloney 0-2 (0-1 f), J O’Mahony, C Geary, R McMahon 0-1 each. | Referee: P O'Mahony (Kilbrittain) |

| 28 August 2022 Round 3 | Bandon | 3-23 - 0-13 | Youghal | Páirc Liam Mhic Cárthaigh |
| | J Mulcahy 2-0, A O’Mahony 1-5, C Long 0-6 (0-4 f, 0-1 65), D Crowley 0-4, M Cahalane 0-3, C Calnan, E McSweeney 0-2 each, C Lynch 0-1. | Report | B Moloney 0-5 (0-1 f, 0-1 65), O Hill 0-3, S Smiddy 0-2, M Breathnach, R Coady, K Browne 0-1 each. |

| 28 August 2022 Round 3 | Valley Rovers | 0-16 - 1-13 | Inniscarra | Cloughduv Grounds |
| | C Butler 0-9 f, K Canty 0-2, T O’Brien, D O’Shea, A Kenneally, E O’Reilly, E Crowley 0-1 each. | Report | F O’Leary 1-4, O McCarthy (0-1 f), D O’Keeffe 0-3 each, C Casey, S O’Donoghue, K Rice 0-1 each. | Referee: M O'Leary (Diarmuid Ó Mathúna's) |

== Group C ==
=== Group C table ===
Advance to knockout stage Advance to relegation play-off

| Team | Matches | | | | Score | | | Pts |
| Team | Pld | W | D | L | For | Against | Diff | Pts |
|---|---|---|---|---|---|---|---|---|
| Castlemartyr | 3 | 2 | 0 | 1 | 74 | 63 | 11 | 4 |
| Ballinhassig | 3 | 2 | 0 | 1 | 69 | 56 | 13 | 4 |
| Ballincollig | 3 | 1 | 0 | 2 | 55 | 71 | -16 | 2 |
| Kilworth | 3 | 1 | 0 | 2 | 62 | 70 | -8 | 2 |

=== Group C results ===
| 31 July 2022 Round 1 | Ballinhassig | 1-21 - 1-15 | Kilworth | Felix Sarsfield Memorial Park |
| | B Lynch 1-3, C Desmond 0-5 f, D O'Sullivan 0-4, E Cullinane 0-3 (0-1 sl), M Collins 0-2 (0-1 f), C Tyres, S O'Neill, G Collins, P Collins (f) 0-1 each. | Report | N McNamara 1-10 (0-9 f, 0-1 65), M Sheehan 0-2, J Saich, E Carey, B Sheehan 0-1 each. | Referee: M O'Mahony (Courcey Rovers) |

| 31 July 2022 Round 1 | Castlemartyr | 2-22 - 1-14 | Ballincollig | Ballinlough Park |
| | M Kelly 1-9 (0-5 f), B Lawton 0-4, J McGann 1-1, J Stack 0-3, M Cosgrove 0-2, Brian Lawton, C Sice, A Kelly 0-1 each. | Report | B Keating 1-6 (1-5 f), T O’Connell 0-2, C O’Driscoll, A Wills, R Bourke, S O’Donoghue, P Cooney, K Walsh 0-1 each. | Referee: C Dineen (Douglas) |

| 6 August 2022 Round 2 | Ballinhassig | 1-19 - 1-09 | Ballincollig | Ballymah GAA Field |
| | C Desmond 0-8 (0-4 f, 0-2 65), E Cullinane 0-5 (0-2 sl), C Tyers 1-0, B Lynch 0-3, P Collins (f), F O’Leary, D O’Sullivan 0-1 each. | Report | B Keating 1-4 (1-3 f, 0-1 65), T O’Connell 0-2, A Wills (f), P Cooney, R Bourke 0-1 each. | Referee: P Lyons (Bishopstown) |

| 6 August 2022 Round 2 | Kilworth | 2-17 - 0-20 | Castlemartyr | St. Catherine's Park |
| | N McNamara 1-8 (0-6 f), E Carey 1-5 (1-0 pen), J Sheehan, R Jordan, L Whelan, B Sheehan 0-1 each. | Report | M Kelly 0-11 (0-7 f, 0-1 65), Barry Lawton 0-4, J Stack 0-2, Brian Lawton, A Kelly, J Lawton 0-1 each. | Referee: J McEvoy |

| 28 August 2022 Round 3 | Kilworth | 3-12 - 1-23 | Ballincollig | Páirc Mac Gearailt |
| | N McNamara 1-9 (0-8 f), J Sheehan 1-1, M Sheehan 1-0, J Saich, E Carey (f) 0-1 each. | Report | B Keating 0-9 (0-6 f, 0-1 65), P Cooney 1-2, J Dwyer 0-4, C Dorgan 0-3, C O’Driscoll, T O’Connell, R Bourke, C Sexton, C O’Leary 0-1 each. | Referee: N O'Neill (Midleton) |

| 28 August 2022 Round 3 | Ballinhassig | 1-20 - 1-23 | Castlemartyr | Páirc Uí Chonaill |
| | E Cullinane 0-7, C Desmond 1-2 (0-1 f), M Sheehan 0-2, G Collins 0-2, D O’Sullivan, B Lynch, F O’Leary, M Collins, S O’Neill, P Collins, C Granger 0-1 each. | Report | M Kelly 0-13 (0-11 f), J O’Callaghan 1-0, Barry Lawton 0-3, Joe Stack, J Lawton 0-2 each, Jamie Stack, Jack McGann, A Kelly 0-1 each. | Referee: M O'Mahony (Courcey Rovers) |

== Knockout stage ==
=== Bracket ===
Quarter-Finals
Carrigaline (Carrigdhoun) | 0-17
Castlemartyr (Imokilly) | 1-16
Bandon (Carbery) | 1-19
Ballinhassig (Carrigdhoun) | 2-18

Semi-Finals
Castlelyons (Imokilly) | 3-17
Castlemartyr (Imokilly) | 2-24
Inniscarra (Muskerry) | 1-18
Ballinhassig (Carrigdhoun) | 1-15

Final
Castlemartyr (Imokilly) | 0-15, 1-17
Inniscarra (Muskerry) | 1-12, 3-12

=== Relegation playoff ===
| 10 September 2022 Playoff | Youghal | 3-11 - 3-21 | Éire Óg | Caherlag Park |
| | S Smiddy 2-1 (0-1 f), B Moloney 0-6 (0-5 f), C Mangan 1-0, C O’Mahony 0-3, R McMahon 0-1. | Report | L Considine 1-6, K Hallissey 0-8 (0-7 f, 0-1 65), C O’Callaghan 2-0, J Cooper 0-3, R O’Toole, J Cooper, D Coakley, O O’Shea 0-1 each. | Referee: M O'Mahony (Courcey Rovers) |

=== Quarter-finals ===
| 10 September 2022 Quarter-final | Carrigaline | 0-17 - 1-16 | Castlemartyr | Páirc Uí Chonaill |
| | B Kelleher 0-9 (0-6 f), É Desmond 0-3 (0-1 sideline), D Drake, R McCarthy 0-2, R O’Shea 0-1. | Report | M Kelly 0-9 (0-5 f, 0-2 65), J Stack 0-5, J McGann 1-0, Brian Lawton, Barry Lawton 0-1 each. | Referee: P Lyons (Bishopstown) |

| 10 September 2022 Quarter-final | Bandon | 1-19 - 2-18 | Ballinhassig | Brinny Sportsfield |
| | C Long 0-7 (0-3 f, 0-1 65), D Crowley 0-6 (0-2 sl, 0-1 f), C Lynch 1-0, M Cahalane 0-3, E McSweeney 0-2, A O’Mahony 0-1. | Report | D O’Sullivan 1-5 (0-3 f) G Collins 1-2 (1-0 pen), B Lynch 0-3 (0-2 f, 0-1 sl), C Desmond 0-3, C Grainger 0-2, E Cullinane, D O’Donovan (f), S O’Neill 0-1 each. | Referee: W Wallis (Aghada) |

=== Semi-finals ===
| 24 September 2022 Semi-final | Castlelyons | 3-17 - 2-24 | Castlemartyr | Páirc Uí Chaoimh |
| | A Spillane 2-3, A Fenton 0-8 (0-4 f, 0-1 65), C Spillane 1-1, J Kearney 0-3, E Maye, N O’Leary 0-1 each. | Report | Barry Lawton, M Kelly (0-2 f) 0-7 each, E Martin 1-3, J Stack 1-1, A Kelly 0-3, J McGann, C Sice, C Joyce 0-1 each. | Referee: S Scanlon (Newcestown) |

| 24 September 2022 Semi-final | Inniscarra | 1-15 - 1-18 | Ballinhassig | Cloughduv Grounds |
| | O McCarthy 0-7 f, S O’Donoghue 0-5, C Casey 1-2, K Rice 0-2, J Enright, F O’Leary 0-1 each. | Report | C Desmond 1-5 (0-3 f), P Collins 0-3 f, G Collins 0-3, D O’Sullivan 0-2 (0-1 f), E Cullinane 0-1, B Lynch 0-1 f. | Referee: N O'Neill (Midleton) |

=== Final ===
| 16 October 2022 Final | Inniscarra | 1-12 - 0-15 | Castlemartyr | Páirc Uí Chaoimh |
| | K Rice (1-0), F O’Leary (0-3), C Casey, O McCarthy (0-1 free) and S O’Donoghue (0-2 each), J Harrington, D O’Keeffe and A McCarthy (0-1 each). | Report | M Kelly (0-7, 0-5 f), J Stack (0-4), Barry Lawton (0-2), C Joyce, and E Martin (0-1 each). | Referee: S Scanlon (Newcestown) |

| 22 October 2022 Final replay | Inniscarra | 3-12 - 1-17 | Castlemartyr | Páirc Uí Chaoimh |
| | P Holland 1-3, O McCarthy 0-5 (0-4 f), C Casey 1-1, D O’Keeffe 1-0, S O’Donoghue, F O’Leary, K Rice 0-1 each. | Report | M Kelly 0-8 (0-6 f, 0-1 65), Barry Lawton 1-2 (0-1 pen), Joe Stack 0-2, C Joyce, J Lawton, C Sice, J McGann, A Kelly 0-1 each. | Referee: C Lyons (Nemo Rangers) |

== Championship statistics ==
=== Top scorers ===
Overall

| Rank | Player | Club | Tally | Total | Matches | Average |
|---|---|---|---|---|---|---|
| 1 | Mike Kelly | Castlemartyr | 1-64 | 67 | 7 | 9.57 |
| 2 | Noel McNamara | Kilworth | 3-27 | 36 | 3 | 12.00 |
| 3 | Alan Fenton | Castlelyons | 0-34 | 34 | 4 | 8.50 |
| 4 | Owen McCarthy | Inniscarra | 1-30 | 33 | 6 | 5.60 |
| 5 | Colm Butler | Valley Rovers | 0-32 | 32 | 3 | 10.66 |
| 6 | Brian Kelleher | Carrigaline | 2-25 | 31 | 4 | 7.75 |
| 7 | Conor Desmond | Ballinhassig | 2-23 | 29 | 5 | 5.80 |
| 7 | Charlie Long | Bandon | 0-29 | 29 | 4 | 7.25 |
| 9 | Brian Keating | Ballincollig | 2-19 | 25 | 3 | 8.33 |
| 9 | Kevin Hallissey | Youghal | 0-25 | 25 | 4 | 6.25 |

In a single game

| Rank | Player | Club | Tally | Total | Opposition |
|---|---|---|---|---|---|
| 1 | Noel McNamara | Kilworth | 1-10 | 13 | Ballinhassig |
| 1 | Mike Kelly | Castlemartyr | 0-13 | 13 | Ballinhassig |
| 3 | Mike Kelly | Castlemartyr | 1-09 | 12 | Ballincollig |
| 3 | Noel McNamara | Kilworth | 1-09 | 12 | Ballincollig |
| 3 | Colm Butler | Valley Rovers | 0-12 | 12 | Youghal |
| 6 | Noel McNamara | Kilworth | 1-08 | 11 | Castlemartyr |
| 6 | Mike Kelly | Castlemartyr | 0-11 | 11 | Kilworth |
| 6 | Colm Butler | Valley Rovers | 0-11 | 11 | Bandon |
| 9 | Brian Kelleher | Carrigaline | 1-07 | 10 | Éire Óg |
| 9 | Owen McCarthy | Inniscarra | 1-07 | 10 | Youghal |
| 9 | Alan Fenton | Castlelyons | 0-10 | 10 | Carrigaline |
