= 1919 Cork Intermediate Hurling Championship =

Hurling tournament

- Champions: Fairhill (1st title)
- Runners-up: Dromina

The 1919 Cork Intermediate Hurling Championship was the 11th staging of the Cork Intermediate Hurling Championship since its establishment by the Cork County Board in 1909.

The final was scheduled to be held between Fair Hill and Dromina, in what would have been their first ever meeting in the final. Dromina conceded a walkover, owing to a dispute over travel arrangements, and Fair Hill were declared the champions.

== Results ==
=== Final ===
Final	Fair Hill	w/o - scr.	Dromina
