= 1965 Cork Junior Hurling Championship =

Irish hurling competition

- Dates: 10 October – 21 November 1965
- Teams: 7
- Champions: Ballinhassig (1st title); Donal Coleman (captain)
- Runners-up: Brian Dillons

Tournament statistics
- Matches played: 6
- Goals scored: 60 (10 per match)
- Points scored: 62 (10.33 per match)

The 1965 Cork Junior Hurling Championship was the 68th staging of the Cork Junior Hurling Championship since its establishment by the Cork County Board in 1895.

The final was played on 21 November 1965 at the Carrigaline Grounds, between Ballinhassig and Brian Dillons, in what was their first ever meeting in the final. Ballinhassig won the match by 6-05 to 1-02 to claim their first ever championship title.

== Results ==
=== Quarter-finals ===
| 10 October 1965 Quarter-final | Carrigtwohill | 5-08 - 4-03 | Inniscarra | Douglas Grounds |
| | P Roche 3-1, O O'Connor 1-1, D Hegarty 1-0, A Kelly 0-2, N Kidney 0-1, D Browne 0-1, T Jeffers 0-1, D Sheehan 0-1. | | T O'Brien 2-0, T Ryan 1-1, H O'Brien 1-0, O O'Brien 0-1, J Brennan 0-1. |

| 24 October 1965 Quarter-final | Ballyhea | 2-06 - 8-07 | Ballinhassig | Cork Athletic Grounds |
| | C Behan 1-1, P Behan 1-1, M Ryan 0-2, J Leahy 0-1, G Russell 0-1. | | Donie Coleman 3-0, G Murphy 2-1, M Hickey 2-0, G Holland 1-0, Derry Coleman 0-3, JK Coleman 0-3. |

| 24 October 1965 Quarter-final | Kanturk | 5-07 - 8-03 | Courcey Rovers | Coachford Sportsfield |
| | S O'Connell 2-4, C Loughlin 1-1, S O'Shea 1-0, T Fitzgerald 1-0, P Smith 0-1, M Loughlin 0-1. | | A Hannon 3-1, V O'Donovan 2-0, C Corcoran 1-1, D Twomey 1-0, A Crowley 1-0, D O'Donovan 0-1. |

=== Semi-finals ===
| 7 November 1965 Semi-final | Brian Dillons | 5-13 - 3-03 | Carrigtwohill | Riverstown Sportsfield |

| 7 November 1965 Semi-final | Ballinhassig | 9-03 - 4-02 | Courcey Rovers | Kinsale Grounds |

=== Final ===
| 21 November 1965 Final | Ballinhassig | 6-05 - 1-02 | Brian Dillons | Carrigaline Grounds |
