= Dromina GAA =

GAA club in Cork, Ireland

Dromina
- Druimne
- Founded: 1888
- County: Cork
- Colours
- Grounds: Dromina GAA Grounds
- Coordinates: 52°18′34.96″N 8°48′18.41″W

Playing kits
Standard colours

Senior Club Championships
	All Ireland	Munster champions	Cork champions
Hurling:	0	0	0

Dromina GAA is a Gaelic Athletic Association club in Dromina, County Cork, Ireland. The club is affiliated to the North Cork Board and the Cork County Board and is exclusively concerned with the game of hurling.

== History ==
Located in the village of Dromina, about 9 km south-west of Charleville, Dromina GAA Club was founded in 1888, however, hurling had been played in the area prior to this. The new club was very active in local tournament games in its early years.

Dromina qualified for the 1919 Division II final, as the competition was then known, however, the team ended up conceding a walkover to Fairhill, owing to a dispute over travel arrangements. The club's first success came in 1927, when Dromina was awarded the North Cork JHC title. The club later amalgamated with Newtownshandrum to form Shandrum United, before later disbanding.

The present Dromina GAA Club was reestablished in 1953. The club operated in the B-grade at junior level before winning three North Cork JAHC titles between 1998 and 2003. The last of these divisional titles was subsequently converted into a Cork JAHC title, following a 2–13 to 0–09 win over Argideen Rangers in the final. Dromina missed out on a second consecutive promotion and title, after losing the 2004 Cork IHC final to Watergrasshill. The club has claimed further North Cork JAHC titles in 2014, 2017 and 2026.

== Honours ==
- Cork Junior A Hurling Championship (1): 2003
- North Cork Junior A Hurling Championship (7): 1927, 1998, 2000, 2003, 2014, 2017, 2026
- North Cork Junior B Hurling Championship (3): 1996, 2003, 2004
- Cork Minor C Hurling Championship (1): 1996

== Notable players ==
- Martin Finn: Christy Ring Cup-winner (2012)
- Liam Hayes: All-Ireland IHC-winning manager (2014)
