= Ger Collins =

Irish hurler (born 1999)

Personal information
- Native name: Gearóid Ó Coileáin (Irish)
- Born: 13 July 1999 (age 27) Ballinhassig, County Cork, Ireland
- Occupation: Student
- Height: 5 ft 10 in (178 cm)

Sport
- Sport: Hurling
- Position: Goalkeeper
Club
- Years: Club
- 2018-present: Ballinhassig
Club titles
- Cork titles: 0
College
- Years: College
- 2018-present: Cork Institute of Technology
College titles
- Fitzgibbon titles: 0
Inter-county*
| Years | County | Apps (scores) |
| 2018-2023 | Cork | 0 (0-00) |
Inter-county titles
- Munster titles: 0
- All-Irelands: 0
- NHL: 0
- All Stars: 0
- *Inter County team apps and scores correct as of 21:34, 3 July 2021.

Ger Collins (born 13 July 1999) is an Irish hurler who plays as a goalkeeper for Cork Premier Championship club Ballinhassig and at inter-county level with the Cork senior hurling team.

== Playing career ==
=== Ballinhassig ===
Collins joined the Ballinhassig club at a young age and played in all grades at juvenile and underage levels as a hurler and Gaelic footballer.

On 16 September 2018, Collins made his first appearance for Ballinhassig's top adult team when he lined out in goal for their 1–22 to 0–14 defeat by Valley Rovers in the Premier Intermediate Championship.

=== Cork ===
==== Minor ====
Collins first lined out for Cork as a member of the minor team during the 2016 Munster Championship. He made his first appearance in goal on 6 April in a 0–17 to 1–10 defeat of Waterford.

Collins was eligible for the minor grade again the following year. On 9 July, he was in goal when Cork defeated Clare by 4–21 to 0–16 to win the Munster Championship for the first time since 2008. On 3 September, Collins was again in goal when Cork suffered a 2–17 to 2–15 defeat by Galway in the All-Ireland final.

==== Under-21 and under-20 ====
Collins subsequently joined the Cork under-21 team for the 2018 Munster Championship and took over as goalkeeper from his brother Patrick. On 4 July, he won a Munster Championship medal following Cork's 2–23 to 1–13 defeat of Tipperary in the final. On 26 August, Collins was in goal for Cork's 3–13 to 1-16 All-Ireland final defeat by Tipperary. He was later named as goalkeeper on the Team of the Year.

On 3 July 2019, Collins made his first appearance for Cork's inaugural under-20 team in the Munster Championship. He lined out in goal in the 1–20 to 0–16 defeat of Limerick. On 23 July 2019, Collins was again in goal when Cork suffered a 3–15 to 2–17 defeat by Tipperary in the Munster final. He was again selected in goal when Cork faced Tipperary for a second time in the All-Ireland final on 24 August 2019, however, he ended the game on the losing side after a 5–17 to 1–18 defeat.

==== Senior ====
Collins was a late addition to the Cork senior team during the 2018 All-Ireland Championship. On 29 July, he was an unused substitute when Cork suffered a 3–32 to 2-21 extra-time defeat by Limerick in the All-Ireland semi-final.

== Career statistics ==
=== Club ===
As of match played 21 April 2019.

| Team | Year | Cork PIHC | |
| Team | Year | Apps | Score |
|---|---|---|---|
| Ballinhassig | 2018 | 1 | 0-00 |
| Ballinhassig | 2019 | 1 | 0-00 |
| Career total | | 2 | 0-00 |

=== Division ===
As of match played 27 March 2019.

| Team | Year | Cork SHC | |
| Team | Year | Apps | Score |
|---|---|---|---|
| Cork I.T. | 2019 | 1 | 0-07 |
| Career total | | 1 | 0-07 |

=== Inter-county ===
As of 31 July 2021.

| Team | Year | National League | | | Munster | | All-Ireland | | Total | |
| Team | Year | Division | Apps | Score | Apps | Score | Apps | Score | Apps | Score |
|---|---|---|---|---|---|---|---|---|---|---|
| Cork | 2018 | Division 1A | — | | — | | 0 | 0-00 | 0 | 0-00 |
| Cork | 2019 | Division 1A | — | | — | | — | | — | |
| Cork | 2020 | Division 1A | — | | — | | — | | — | |
| Cork | 2021 | Division 1A | 1 | 0-00 | 0 | 0-00 | 0 | 0-00 | 1 | 0-00 |
| Total | | | 1 | 0-00 | 0 | 0-00 | 0 | 0-00 | 1 | 0-00 |

== Honours ==
Cork

- Munster Under-21 Hurling Championship (1): 2018
- Munster Minor Hurling Championship (1): 2017
