= 2024 Cork Premier Intermediate Hurling Championship =

Annual hurling competition season

- Dates: 3 August - 1 December 2024
- Teams: 12
- Sponsor: Co-Op Superstores
- Champions: Watergrasshill (1st title); Seán Desmond (captain); Eddie Enright (manager)
- Runners-up: Carrigaline; Rob O'Shea (captain); David Griffin (captain); Eddie Murphy (manager)
- Relegated: Aghabullogue

Tournament statistics
- Matches played: 24
- Goals scored: 66 (2.75 per match)
- Points scored: 888 (37 per match)
- Top scorer(s): Brian Kelleher (0-50)

The 2024 Cork Premier Intermediate Hurling Championship is the 21st staging of the Cork Premier Intermediate Hurling Championship since its establishment by the Cork County Board in 2004. The draw for the group stage placings took place on 14 December 2023. The championship is scheduled to run from 3 August to 1 December 2024.

The final was played on 10 November 2024 at SuperValu Páirc Uí Chaoimh in Cork, between Watergrasshill and Carrigaline, in what was their first ever meeting in the final. Watergrasshill won the match by 2-16 to 0-19 to claim their first ever championship title.

Carrigaline's Brian Kelleher was the championship's top scorer with 0-50.

== Team changes ==
=== To Championship ===
Relegated from the Cork Senior A Hurling Championship

- Mallow

Promoted from the Cork Intermediate A Hurling Championship

- Aghabullogue

=== From Championship ===
Promoted to the Cork Senior A Hurling Championship

- Castlelyons

Relegated to the Cork Intermediate A Hurling Championship

- Bandon

== Group A ==
=== Group A table ===
Knockout stage

Team	Matches				Score			Pts
Team	Pld	W	D	L	For	Against	Diff	Pts
Watergrasshill	3	3	0	0	70	62	8	6
Carrigaline	3	1	0	2	62	62	0	2
Castlemartyr	3	1	0	2	62	65	-3	2
Valley Rovers	3	1	0	1	60	65	-5	2

=== Group A results ===
3 August 2024 Round 1	Carrigaline	2-17 - 2-19	Watergrasshill	Ballincollig Grounds
	B Kelleher 0-10 (0-6 f), R O’Shea 1-2, C Barry 1-0, D Drake 0-3, K O’Reilly, F O’Connell 0-1 each.	Report	A Murphy 0-11 (0-4 f, 0-1 sl), B Lehane, S Desmond 1-1 each, A Cronin, C Healy, C O’Leary, J McCarthy, A Spriggs, L Foley 0-1 each.

3 August 2024 Round 1	Valley Rovers	1-21 - 0-22	Castlemartyr	Riverstick Grounds
	C Butler 0-11 (0-7 f, 0-1 65); E Crowley 1-2, E O’Reilly 0-3, C McCarthy 0-2, R O’Sullivan, J Cottrell, J Kenneally 0-1 each.	Report	M Kelly 0-12 (0-9 f); Brian Lawton, Barry Lawton 0-3 each, C Joyce 0-2, C O’Neill, B McGann 0-1 each.

25 August 2024 Round 2	Watergrasshill	3-12 - 1-16	Castlemartyr	Aghavine Grounds
	A Murphy (1-7, 1-0 s/l, 3f, 1 65), B Lehane (1-3), A Foley (1-0), S Desmond, M O’Driscoll (0-1 each).	Report	M Kelly (0-11, 5f, 3 65s), B McGann (1-0), M O’Dwyer (0-3), Barry Lawton, Brian Lawton (0-1 each).

25 August 2024 Round 2	Valley Rovers	0-16 - 0-19	Carrigaline	Páirc Uí Riagáin
	C Butler (0-9, 9fs), B McCarthy, J Walsh, E Guinnane, J Cottrell, E O’Reily, A Kenneally and E Crowley (0-1 each).	Report	B Kelleher (0-6, 5s), C Kearney and R McCarthy (0-3 each), C Barry (0-2), C Vaughan, D Griffin, R O’Shea, F O’Connell and D Drake (0-1 each).

8 September 2024 Round 3	Castlemartyr	1-18 - 0-20	Carrigaline	Páirc Lios gCúl
	B McGann 1-3, M Kelly 0-6 (0-1 65), B Lawton, B Lawton 0-2 each, M O'Dwyer, C Whyte, J McGann, D Joyce, A Kelly 0-1 each.	Report	B Kelleher 0-8 (0-4 f), D Drake 0-4, F O'Connell 0-3, R Mccarthy 0-2, C Barry, R O'Shea, E Desmond 0-1 each.

8 September 2024 Round 3	Valley Rovers	1-17 - 2-18	Watergrasshill	Páirc Uí Rinn
	C Butler 0-9 (0-7 f), E Guinane 1-2, E Crowley 0-3, J Walsh, R O’Sullivan, C McCarthy 0-1 each.	Report	S Desmond 1-4, A Murphy 0-6 (0-2 f), B Lehane 1-2, A Foley 0-2 f, D O’Leary, L Foley, M O’Driscoll, K O’Neill 0-1 each.

== Group B ==
=== Group B table ===
Knockout stage Relegation playoff

Team	Matches				Score			Pts
Team	Pld	W	D	L	For	Against	Diff	Pts
Ballincollig	3	3	0	0	72	47	25	6
Mallow	3	1	0	2	70	77	-7	2
Éire Óg	3	1	0	2	63	70	-7	2
Aghabullogue	3	1	0	2	56	67	-11	2

=== Group B results ===
3 August 2024 Round 1	Éire Óg	0-20 - 0-18	Aghabullogue	Clondrohid Grounds
	E O’Shea 0-11 (0-6 f), O O’Shea 0-3, J Sheehan 0-2, D Foley, K Hallissey, C O’Callaghan, D Casey 0-1 each.	Report	M Bradley 0-5 (0-3 f), S Tarrant 0-3 (0-2 f), J Corkery 0-3, J Foley, S Fury 0-2 each, J Buckley, D Thompson, B Dineen 0-1 each.

4 August 2024 Round 1	Mallow	2-12 - 2-19	Ballincollig	Ballyanley Grounds
	S Hayes 0-7 (0-5 f), S Leneghan (sl), P Lyons 1-1 each, M Tobin 0-2 f, D Sheehan 0-1.	Report	S Wills 0-6 (0-2 f), P Morris 0-5 (0-3 f), C O’Driscoll, S O’Neill 1-1 each, T O’Connell, J Dwyer 0-2 each, D O’Sullivan, A Wills 0-1 each.

23 August 2024 Round 2	Ballincollig	1-19 - 1-12	Éire Óg	Cloughduv Grounds
	S Wills (1-5, 0-4 frees); P Morris (0-2 frees), B Keating (0-4 each); A Wills (0-3), F Denny, J Dwyer, C O’Driscoll (0-1 each).	Report	E O’Shea (0-6, 0-6 frees); C O’Sullivan (1-0 OG); B Corcoran, D McCarthy, C O’Callaghan, K Hallissey, J Cooper, O O’Shea (0-1 each).

24 August 2024 Round 2	Aghabullogue	3-15 - 2-16	Mallow	Grenagh Grounds
	M Bradley 0-9 (0-6 f, 0-2 65), J Lane 2-1, J Foley 1-2, C Gillespie, P Ring, J Corkery 0-1 each.	Report	M Tobin 0-8 (0-5 f), D Hayes 2-0; D Sheehan 0-4; P Lyons, G Lenihan, S Leneghan, K Sheehan 0-1 each.

8 September 2024 Round 3	Mallow	4-18 - 4-16	Éire Óg	Grenagh Grounds
	S Hayes (1-6, 0-5 f), M Tobin (0-6, 0-3 f), D Hayes, K Sheehan, D Sheehan (1-2 each).	Report	E O’Shea (1-11, 0-6 f), J Cooper (2-1), C O’Callaghan (1-0), D Foley, D Casey, O O’Shea, D Kirwan (0-1 each).

8 September 2024 Round 3	Ballincollig	1-22 - 0-14	Aghabullogue	Ballyanley Grounds
	S Wills (0-9, 7f), B Keating (1-2), A Wills (0-3), P Morris (0-3, 2f), J O’Dwyer (0-2), D O’Sullivan, C O’Driscoll, C O’Leary (0-1 each).	Report	M Bradley (0-9, 7fs), S Tarrant (0-3, 2fs), J Corkery and TJ Buckley (0-1 each).

== Group C ==
=== Group C table ===
Knockout stage Relegation playoff

Team	Matches				Score			Pts
Team	Pld	W	D	L	For	Against	Diff	Pts
Dungourney	3	2	0	1	64	60	4	4
Ballinhassig	3	2	0	1	83	67	16	4
Ballymartle	3	1	0	2	68	78	-10	2
Kilworth	3	1	0	2	70	80	-10	2

=== Group C results ===
3 August 2024 Round 1	Ballinhassig	0-20 - 0-21	Dungourney	Páirc Uí Chonaill
	G Collins 0-14 (0-8 f, 0-1 65), J Grainger, J O’Callaghan C Grainger, E Cullinhane, F O'Leary, E Lombard 0-1 each.	Report	J Leahy 0-15 (0-11 f, 0-2 65), J Ahearn 0-2, M McGrath B Forbes, Niall McGrath, R Denny 0-1 each.

4 August 2024 Round 1	Kilworth	2-17 - 2-23	Ballymartle	Felix Sarsfield Memorial Park
	L Whelan 1-5, N McNamara 0-6 (0-5 f), W Condon 1-1, L Carey 0-2, M Sheehan, S Keane, L Coffey 0-1 each.	Report	D McCarthy 1-5 (0-4 f), R Cahalane 0-6, C Lordan 1-3, P Dorney, S Cummins, J McCarthy 0-2 each, D O’Leary (65), F Desmond, L O’Callaghan 0-1 each.

25 August 2024 Round 2	Dungourney	1-17 - 2-20	Kilworth	Páirc Lios gCúl
	J Leahy 0-12 (0-8 f), K Cody Byrne 1-0, N McGrath 0-2, S Hegarty, R Denny, M Leahy 0-1 each.	Report	N McNamara, M Sheehan 0-6 (0-3 f) each, E Carey 1-1, L Carey 1-0, L Coffey 0-3, J Saich, N Byrne, B Sheehan, L Whelan 0-1 each.

25 August 2024 Round 2	Ballymartle	3-16 - 2-26	Ballinhassig	Páirc Liam Mhic Cárthaigh
	D McCarthy 0-7 f, C Lordan 2-0, S Corry 1-0, L O’Callaghan, 0-3, F Desmond, John McCarthy 0-2 each, S Cummins, R Cahalane 0-1.	Report	G Collins 0-10 (0-3 f, 0-1 65), A O'Sullivan 1-3 (1-0 sl), P Collins 1-2 (0-1 f), E Cullinane 0-4, D O’Sullivan 0-3, C Grainger 0-2, C Desmond F O'Leary 0-1 each.

8 September 2024 Round 3	Ballymartle	0-14 - 1-20	Dungourney	Ballymaw Grounds
	S Cummins 0-5, J McCarthy 0-4 (0-3 f), P Dorney 0-2, L O’Callaghan, R Deasy, D McCarthy (f) 0-1 each.	Report	J Leahy 0-11 (0-8 f), K Cody-Byrne 1-0 J Ahern 0-3, N McGrath 0-2, N Motherway, D Healy, S Hegarty, M Leahy 0-1 each.

8 September 2024 Round 3	Kilworth	0-21 - 2-25	Ballinhassig	Castlelyons Grounds
	N McNamara 0-8 (0-7 f), F Sheehan 0-4 f, C Donnellan 0-3, L Carey 0-2, L Whelan, E Casey, W Condon, J Saich 0-1 each.	Report	G Collins 1-7 (1-0 pen, 0-5 f), B Lynch 0-5, D O'Sullivan 0-4 (0-1 f), F O'Leary 1-1, P Collins 0-2 (0-1 f), C Desmond, E Lombard, A O'Sullivan C Grainger, S O'Neill, E Cullinane 0-1 each.

== Knockout stage ==
=== Bracket ===
Quarter-Finals
Ballinhassig (Carrigdhoun)	1–16
Carrigaline (Carrigdhoun)	1–19
Dungourney (Imokilly)	0–18
Mallow (Avondhu)	3–15

Semi-Finals
Ballincollig (Muskerry)	1-18
Carrigaline (Carrigdhoun)	1-19
Watergrasshill (Imokilly)	4-16
Mallow (Avondhu)	1-14

Final
Carrigaline (Carrigdhoun)	0-19
Watergrasshill (Imokilly)	2-16

=== Relegation playoff ===
21 September 2024 Playoff	Kilworth	2-26 - 2-26 (aet)	Aghabullogue	Blarney Grounds
	N McNamara (0-5 f), E Carey (0-2 f, 0-1 sl) 0-6 each, M Sheehan 0-5 (0-1 f), B Sheehan, C Donnellan 1-1 each, J Saich (0-1 sl), J Sheehan 0-2 each, L Carey, L Coffey, W Condon 0-1 each.	Report	M Bradley 1-14 (0-8 f), L Casey 1-1, J Corkery 0-3, C Gillespie, J Foley 0-2 each, S Tarrant, P O’Sullivan, TJ Buckley, P Ring 0-1 each.

1 December 2024 Playoff replay	Kilworth	3-14 - 2-12	Aghabullogue	O'Connell Park
	L Coffey 2-0, M Sheehan 0-6 (0-5 frees), W Condon 1-1, E Carey 0-4, L Whelan 0-2, N McNamara 0-1.	Report	M Bradley 0-7 (0-6 frees), D Dineen 1-2, L Casey 1-0, S Furey, S Tarrant, C Furey 0-1 each.

=== Quarter-finals ===
21 September 2024 Quarter-final	Ballinhassig	1-19 - 1-26	Carrigaline	Ballymartle Grounds
	D O’Sullivan 1-6 (0-3 frees, 1-0 pen, 0-1 65), F O’Leary 0-5, A O’Sullivan 0-4 each, E Cullinane 0-2, B Lynch, J Grainger 0-1 each.	Report	B Kelleher 0-10 (0-5 frees), D Drake 0-4, C Kearney 1-1, R McCarthy and D Griffin 0-3 each, E Desmond and R O’Shea 0-2 each, K Kavanagh 0-1.

21 September 2024 Quarter-final	Dungourney	0-18 - 3-15	Mallow	Páirc Uí Rinn
	J Leahy (0-9, 0-6 frees); S Hegarty (0-3); N McGrath (0-2); M Leahy, D Healy, J Ahern, K Cody Byrne (0-1 each).	Report	S Hayes (0-8, 0-6 frees); M Tobin (1-3, 1-0 free); Dan Sheehan (1-2); P Healy (1-0); K Sheehan, B Murphy (0-1 each).

=== Semi-finals ===
6 October 2024 Semi-final	Ballincollig	1-18 - 1-19	Carrigaline	Páirc Liam Mhic Cárthaigh
	S Wills 0-11 (0-9 f), P Morris 1-1, J Lenihan (f), D O’Sullivan, J Dwyer, B Keating, C O’Driscoll, C Dorgan 0-1 each.	Report	B Kelleher 0-9 (0-4 f), R McCarthy 1-3, R O’Shea, C Kearney 0-2 each, E Desmond, D Griffin, D Drake 0-1 each.

26 October 2024 Semi-final	Watergrasshill	4-16 - 1-14	Mallow	Castletownroche Grounds
	A Murphy 0-7 (0-4 f, 0-1 65), P O’Leary 2-0, B Lehane, C O’Leary 1-1 each, A Foley (f), D O’Leary, D McCarthy, M O’Driscoll, A Spriggs, L Foley, S Desmond 0-1 each.	Report	S Hayes 0-8 (0-7 f, 0-1 65), S O’Callaghan 1-0, M Tobin 0-3, K Sheehan (65), Dan Sheehan, B Murphy 0-1 each.

=== Final ===
10 November 2024 Final	Carrigaline	0-19 - 2-16	Watergrasshill	SuperValu Páirc Uí Chaoimh
	B Kelleher 0-7 (0-6 f), D Drake 0-4, É Desmond, D Griffin 0-3 each, R McCarthy, R O’Shea 0-1 each.	Report	A Murphy 0-8 (0-4 f, 0-1 65), S Desmond 1-1, B Lehane 0-3, P O’Leary 1-0, S O’Regan, M O’Driscoll, A Foley (f), C O’Leary 0-1 each.	Referee: S Stokes (Tullylease)

== Championship statistics ==
=== Top scorers ===
Overall

Rank	Player	Club	Tally	Total	Matches	Average
1	Brian Kelleher	Carrigaline	0-50	50	6	8.33
2	Matthew Bradley	Aghabullogue	1-44	47	5	9.40
2	Jack Leahy	Dungourney	0-47	47	4	11.75
4	Adam Murphy	Watergrasshill	1-39	42	5	8.40
5	Ger Collins	Ballinhassig	1-31	34	3	11.33
5	Steven Wills	Ballincollig	1-31	34	4	8.50
7	Seán Hayes	Mallow	1-29	32	4	8.00
8	Eoin O'Shea	Éire Óg	1-28	31	3	10.33
9	Mike Kelly	Castlemartyr	0-29	29	3	9.66
9	Colm Butler	Valley Rovers	0-29	29	3	9.66

In a single game

Rank	Player	Club	Tally	Total	Opposition
1	Matthew Bradley	Aghabullogue	1-14	17	Kilworth
2	Jack Leahy	Dungourney	0-15	15	Ballinhassig
3	Eoin O'Shea	Éire Óg	1-11	14	Mallow
3	Ger Collins	Ballinhassig	0-14	14	Dungourney
5	Mike Kelly	Castlemartyr	0-12	12	Valley Rovers
5	Jack Leahy	Dungourney	0-12	12	Kilworth
7	Adam Murphy	Watergrasshill	0-11	11	Carrigaline
7	Steven Wills	Ballincollig	0-11	11	Carrigaline
7	Jack Leahy	Dungourney	0-11	11	Ballymartle
7	Mike Kelly	Castlemartyr	0-11	11	Watergrasshill
7	Colm Butler	Valley Rovers	0-11	11	Castlemartyr
7	Eoin O'Shea	Éire Óg	0-11	11	Aghabullogue
