= Dromina =

Village in County Cork, Ireland

Dromina Drom Aidhne
- Village
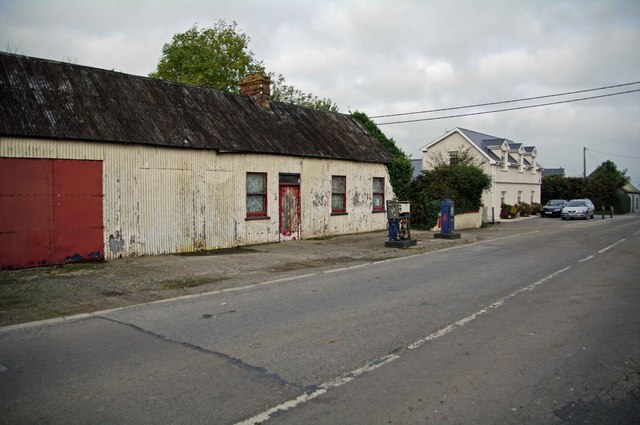
- Closed garage and petrol station in Dromina

- Location in Ireland
- Coordinates: 52.314°N 8.802°W
- Country: Ireland
- Province: Munster
- County: Cork

Population (2016)
  - Total: 275
- Irish Grid Reference: R453183

Dromina (Irish: Drom Aidhne) is a village and townland in County Cork, Ireland. 9 km south-west of Charleville, the village is in the civil parish of Shandrum, close to the village of Newtownshandrum. As of the 2016 census, Dromina had a population of 275 people, up from 207 as of the 1996 census.

The local church, Saints Peter and Paul church (built in 1936), is in Shandrum parish within the Roman Catholic Diocese of Cloyne. As of the start of the 2020 school year, Dromina's national (primary) school had an enrollment of 68 pupils.

== Notable residents ==
- Dónal Finn (born 1995), actor

== See also ==
- Dromina GAA, the local Gaelic Athletic Association club
