= Martin Finn (hurler) =

London hurler

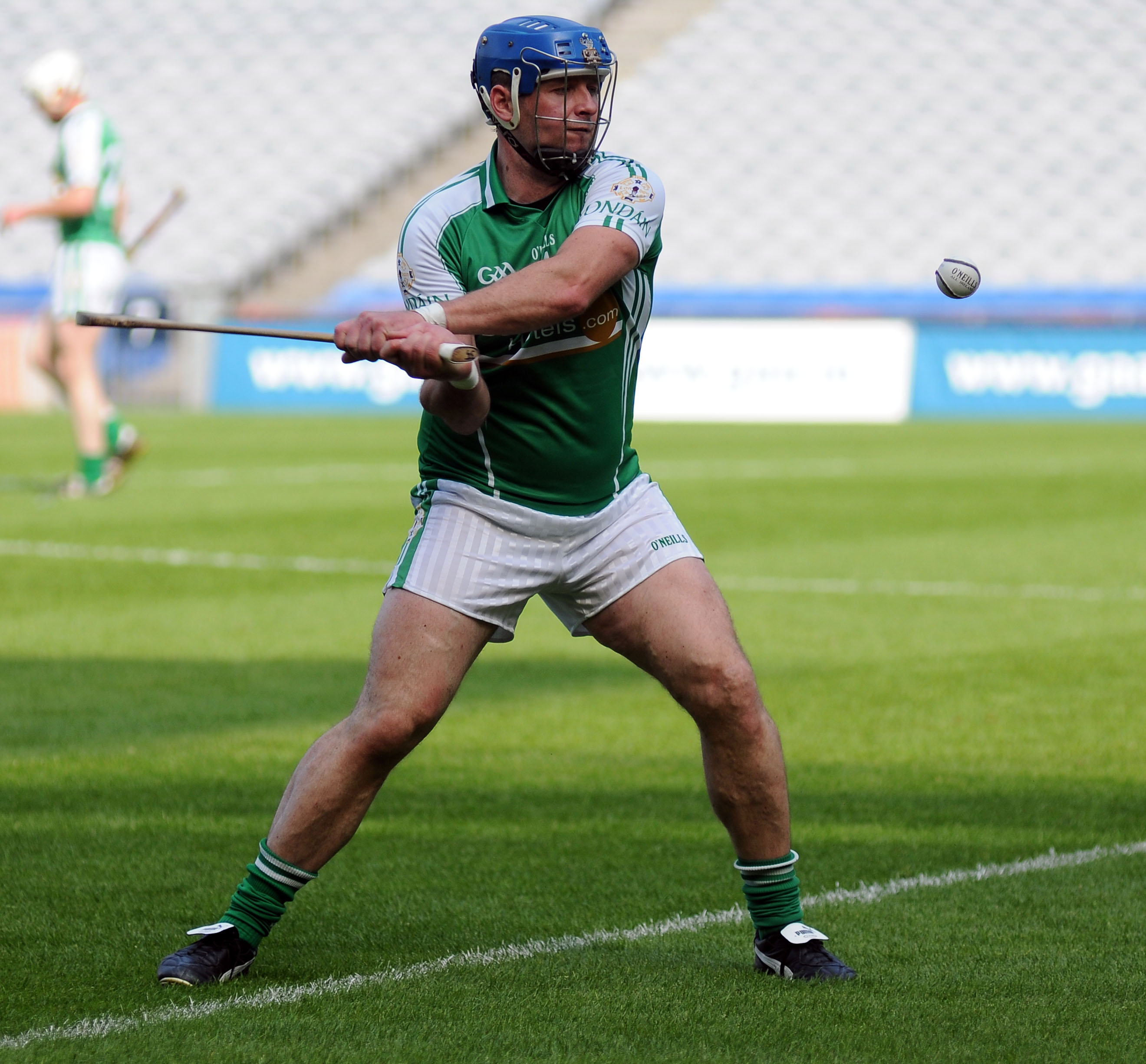
- Martin Finn in action for London in the 2012 Nicky Rackard Cup final at Croke Park

Personal information
- Native name: Máirtín Ó Finn (Irish)
- Nickname: Roundy
- Born: 1979 (age 46–47) Dromina, County Cork, Ireland
- Occupation: Electrician

Sport
- Sport: Hurling
- Position: Full-forward
Clubs
- Years: Club
- Dromina; St Gabriel's
Club titles
- London titles: 2
Inter-county
- Years: County
- New York; London
Inter-county titles
- Leinster titles: 0
- All-Irelands: 0
- NHL: 0
- All Stars: 0

Martin Finn (born 1979) is an Irish hurler who has played as a full-forward at senior level for the London county team.

Finn began his inter-county career as a member of the Cork under-21 hurling team. After emigrating from Ireland, he linked up with the New York and London senior hurling teams. As an inter-county hurler, he has won one Christy Ring Cup winners' medal and one Nicky Rackard Cup winners' medal. Finn has been an Ulster SHC runner-up on one occasion.

At the club level, Finn is a two-time county senior championship medalist with St Gabriel's. He previously won a county junior championship medal with Dromina.
