= Watergrasshill GAA =

Gaelic games club in County Cork, Ireland

Watergrasshill
- Cnocán na Biolraí
- Founded: 1928
- County: Cork
- Nickname: The Hill
- Colours
- Grounds: Felix Sarsfield Memorial Park
- Coordinates: 52°01′16.40″N 8°20′12.37″W

Playing kits
Standard colours

Watergrasshill GAA is a Gaelic Athletic Association club in Watergrasshill, County Cork, Ireland. The club is affiliated to the East Cork Board and fields teams in hurling and camogie. Gaelic football is played by sister club Glenville .

== History ==
Located in the village of Watergrasshill, about halfway between Cork and Fermoy, Watergrasshill GAA Club was founded in 1928. The club spent much of its early existence operating in the junior grade, winning the first of six East Cork JBHC titles in 1947. Watergrasshill made their first breakthrough in 1974 when, after winning their first East Cork JAHC, the club later claimed the Cork JHC title after a 3-08 to 0-10 win over Charleville in the final.

After returning to the junior grade and adding East Cork JAHC titles in 2000 and 2003, Watergrasshill won the Cork IHC title in 2004, following a 2-13 to 2–08 win over Dromina in the final. The club spent the next 20 seasons participating in the higher grade Cork PIHC before claiming the title in 2024, after a 2-16 to 0-19 win over Carrigaline. Watergrasshill later won the Munster Club IHC title, before adding the All-Ireland Club IHC title following a 2-15 to 0-18 defeat of Tynagh-Abbey/Duniry in the 2025 All-Ireland club final.

== Honours ==
- All-Ireland Intermediate Club Hurling Championship (1): 2025
- Munster Intermediate Club Hurling Championship (1): 2024
- Cork Premier Intermediate Hurling Championship (1): 2024 (Runners up 2007)
- Cork Intermediate Hurling Championship (1): 2004
- Cork Junior A Hurling Championship (1): 1974
- Cork Junior B Inter-Divisional Hurling Championship (1): 2018
- East Cork Junior A Hurling Championship (3): 1974, 2000, 2003
- East Cork Junior B Hurling Championship (6): 1947, 1968, 1997, 1999, 2001, 2018
- Cork Under-21 B Hurling Championship (1): 2015
- East Cork Under-21 B Hurling Championship (6): 1976, 1981, 1998, 2005, 2013, 2015
- East Cork Minor A Hurling Championship (2): 2001, 2010

== Notable players ==
- Daire O'Leary: All-Ireland U20HC-winner (2020, 2021)
- Eamon Ryan (Gaelic footballer): Munster SFC-winner (1966, 1967)
