= Ballinhassig GAA =

Gaelic games club in County Cork, Ireland

Ballinhassig
- Béal Átha an Chasaigh
- Founded: 1886
- County: Cork
- Nickname: The Blues
- Colours
- Grounds: Ballinhassig GAA Grounds
- Coordinates: 51°48′40.35″N 8°31′43.73″W

Playing kits
Standard colours

Ballinhassig GAA is a Gaelic Athletic Association club in Ballinhassig, County Cork, Ireland. The club is affiliated to the Carrigdhoun Board and fields teams in both hurling and Gaelic football.

== History ==
Located in the village of Ballinhassig, about 10 km from Cork, Ballinhassig GAA Club was founded in 1886. The new club found it difficult to field teams and sometimes joined with nearby Ballygarvan GAA Club as Owenabue Rovers, before eventually disbanding. Ballinhassig was reformed in 1945 and immediately became a dominant force in the South East JHC, winning 11 titles between 1946 and 1965. The last divisional titles was subsequently converted into a Cork JHC title following a 6–05 to 1–02 defeat of Brian Dillons in the final.

Ballinhassig claimed a second Cork JHC after a 1–06 to 0–05 defeat of Meelin in 1973. This was followed two years later with a Cork IHC triumph and senior status for the first time ever. Ballinhassig regraded after just one season in the top tier and added a second Cork IHC title to their collection in 1977 but declined promotion.

After eventually finding their way back to the junior ranks, Ballinhassig won a third Cork JAHC title when, in 2002, they beat Fr O'Neill's in the final. The first official Munster Club JHC soon followed before Ballinhassig beat Blacks and Whites of Kilkenny by 4–15 to 1–06 in the 2003 All-Ireland Club JHC final. Ballinhassig were one of the original 16 teams that formed the Cork PIHC in 2004, and won the title a year later after beating Aghada. The club subsequently claimed the Munster Club IHC title before being beaten by Dicksboro in the 2006 All-Ireland Club IHC final.

Ballinhassig once again became a senior club after claiming their second Cork PIHC title after a 1–19 to 1–12 defeat of Bandon in 2012. The club also made a Gaelic football breakthrough that year when they won the first of four South East JAFC titles.

== Honours ==
- All-Ireland Junior Club Hurling Championship (1): 2003
- All-Ireland Intermediate Club Hurling Championship (0): (Runners-Up 2006)
- Munster Junior Club Hurling Championship (1): 2002
- Munster Intermediate Club Hurling Championship (1): 2005
- Cork Premier Intermediate Hurling Championship (3): 2005, 2012, 2025
- Cork Intermediate A Hurling Championship (2): 1975, 1977 (Runners-Up 1983)
- Cork Intermediate A Football Championship (0): (Runners-Up 1929) (as Owenabue Rovers)
- Cork Junior A Hurling Championship (3): 1965, 1973, 2002 (Runners-Up 1954, 1971, 1995, 2000, 2014)
- Cork Junior A Football Championship (0): (Runners-Up 2021)
- Cork Under-21 Hurling Championship (0): (Runners-Up 2009)
- Cork Minor A Hurling Championship (2): 2002, 1987 (Runners-Up 1998)
- South East Junior A Hurling Championship (29): 1928, 1946, 1948, 1953, 1954, 1955, 1956, 1960, 1961, 1962, 1964, 1965, 1960, 1971, 1973, 1991, 1992, 1994, 1995, 1996, 1998, 2000, 2002, 2006, 2009, 2011, 2012, 2013, 2014
- South East Junior A Football Championship (5): 1928, 2012, 2015, 2019, 2021
- Cork Senior Hurling League (2): 2007, 2008
- Cork Intermediate Hurling League (4): 1984, 2005, 2014, 2018
- Cork Junior Football League (1): 2019
- Cork Minor Non Exam Hurling (1): 2010
- South-East Under 21 "A" Hurling Championship (7): 1979, 2000, 2001, 2004, 2006, 2009, 2015
- South-East Under 21 "B" Football Championship (3): 2011, 2016, 2024
- Mid Cork Under 19 "A" Hurling Championship (1): 2022

== Notable players ==
- Martin Coleman: All-Ireland SHC-winner (1970, 1976, 1977, 1978)
- Patrick Collins: National Hurling League-winner (2025)
- Con Cottrell: All-Ireland SHC-winner (1941, 1942, 1943, 1944, 1946)
- Seán McCarthy: All-Ireland SHC-winner (1990)
