= Seán Crowley =

Irish hurler, Gaelic footballer and administrator (1921–2009

Personal information
- Native name: Seán Ó Crualaoich (Irish)
- Nickname: Seánie
- Born: 16 November 1921 Bandon, County Cork, Ireland
- Died: 27 August 2009 (aged 87) Bandon, County Cork, Ireland
- Occupations: Publican, cattle dealer, rate collector

Sport
- Sport: Hurling
- Position: Left corner-back
Clubs
- Years: Club
- Bandon → Carbery
Club titles
	Football	Hurling
Cork titles	0	0
Inter-county
Years	County	Apps (scores)
1945–1946	Cork	0 (0-00)
Inter-county titles
- Munster titles: 0
- All-Irelands: 0
- NHL: 0

John Crowley (16 November 1921 – 27 August 2009), known as Seán Crowley, was an Irish hurler, Gaelic footballer, selector and administrator. At club level he played with Bandon, divisional side Carbery and at inter-county level with Cork.

== Playing career ==
Crowley first played Gaelic football and hurling with the Bandon club in West Cork. He won several divisional championship titles before winning a Cork JHC title in 1949. Crowley added a Cork IHC title to his collection in 1952, before winning a Cork JFC medal in 1953. His performances at club level also earned selection to the Carbery divisional team as a dual player.

At inter-county level, Crowley made a number of appearances for the Cork senior hurling team during the 1945–46 National League. He failed to make the championship panel but lined out for the junior team beaten by Limerick in the 1946 Munster final. Crowley won an All-Ireland JHC medal as a non-playing substitute when Cork beat London in the 1950 All-Ireland junior final.

== Post-playing career ==
Crowley was still an active player when he became involved in the administrative affairs of the GAA. He was his club's representative to the West Cork Board in the 1940s before taking over an 18-year tenure as West Cork chairman in 1961. Crowley was also a delegate to the Cork County Board.

As a coach and selector, Crowley was involved at all levels with the Bandon club and with divisional side Carbery. He was a Cork senior football team selector when they won the All-Ireland SFC title in 1973.

== Personal life and death ==
Crowley was born in Bandon, County Cork in November 1921. After his education at Bandon Technical School, he worked as a cattle dealer before taking over the family pub in 1959. Crowley took up a post as a rate collector with Cork County Council in 1965. He retired from the pub trade in 1982.

Crowley married Noreen O'Neill in July 1948. His son, Noel Crowley, won a Munster SFC medal with Cork in 1973. Another son, Pádraig Crowley, won consecutive Munster SHC medals with Cork in 1982 and 1983. Crowley's grandsons, Darren and Ronan Crowley, have lined out at inter-county level with Cork and London respectively and another grandson Sean Power hurled and captained Dublin Senior Hurlers .

Crowley died after a long illness on 27 August 2009, aged 86.

== Honours ==
=== Player ===
Bandon

- Cork Intermediate Hurling Championship: 1952
- Cork Junior Football Championship: 1953
- Cork Junior Hurling Championship: 1949
- South West Junior Hurling Championship: 1949
- South West Junior Football Championship: 1947, 1950, 1951, 1952, 1953

Cork

- All-Ireland Junior Hurling Championship: 1950
- Munster Junior Hurling Championship: 1950

=== Management ===
Cork

- All-Ireland Senior Football Championship: 1973
- Munster Senior Football Championship: 1971, 1973, 1974
