= Noel Crowley (dual player) =

Irish hurler and Gaelic footballer

Personal information
- Native name: Nollaig Ó Crualaoich (Irish)
- Born: 17 December 1951 (age 74) Bandon, County Cork, Ireland
- Occupations: Bank official, Gaelic games development officer

Sport
- Sport: Gaelic football
- Position: Left wing-back
Clubs
- Years: Club
- 1970–1981 1970–1985 1982–1987: Bandon → Carbery; O'Donovan Rossa
Club titles
- Cork titles: 1
Inter-county
Years	County	Apps (scores)
1972–1974	Cork	0 (0–0)
Inter-county titles
- Munster titles: 1
- All-Irelands: 0
- NFL: 0
- All Stars: 0

Andrew Noel Crowley (born 17 December 1951) is an Irish former hurler, Gaelic footballer and coach. At club level he played with Bandon, O'Donovan Rossa and divisional side Carbery, and also lined out at inter-county level with various Cork teams.

== Playing career ==
Born in Bandon, County Cork, Crowley first played Gaelic football and hurling as a student at St Finbarr's College in Cork. He was part of the "Farna" team that won the Harty Cup and All-Ireland titles in 1969.

Crowley simultaneously made his first appearances on the club scene as a dual player, winning a range of divisional minor and under-21 titles with Bandon, before lining out at adult level. He also captained the Carbery divisional football team to the Cork SFC title in 1971. Crowley was later a dual Cork JHC and JFC medal-winner, while he also the club's top scorer when Bandon won the Cork IHC title in 1974.

At inter-county level, Crowley first appeared on the Cork minor hurling team that won the All-Ireland MHC title in 1969. He progressed to the under-21 team and was at midfield when Cork beat Wexford in the 1971 All-Ireland Under-21 HC final.

Crowley enjoyed his first adult inter-county success when the Cork junior football team won the All-Ireland JFC title in 1972. He made his senior team debut that year and lined out in numerous National League games, while also earning a call up to the Cork senior hurling team. Crowley won a Munster SFC medal as a non-playing substitute in 1974.

Almost a decade later, Crowley enjoyed his final All-Ireland success when he was part of the Cork junior hurling team that beat Galway in the 1983 All-Ireland JHC final. He ended his club career with O'Donovan Rossa in Skibbereen, and was player–selector when the club won the Cork IFC title in 1985 scoring a crucial goal.

== Coaching career ==
After being a selector/player with the O'Donovan Rossa club that won the Cork IFC title in 1985, Crowley spent three years as a selector with the Cork under-21 football team. He coached O'Donovan Rossa to U21 County titles. He was manager of the Carbery divisional hurling team that won the Cork SHC title in 1994. It remains their only championship title. Crowley later managed the Delaneys hurling team. He has also coached cork developments squads and Harty Cup teams in St.Colmans and Hamilton High School.

== Personal life ==
Crowley's father, Seán Crowley, was a stalwart of the Bandon club who also played junior hurling with Cork. He was a selector when the Cork senior football team won the All-Ireland SFC title in 1973 and was also an officer of the Cork County Board. His son Noel coached Fermoy to numerous U21 divisional titles and to the county intermediate football title in 2015 and Shamrocks to Divisional Titles in Waterford. His son Shane has coached O'Donovan Rossa to an U21 County Title. Crowley's brother, Pádraig, won consecutive Munster SHC medals with Cork, while his nephews, Darren and Ronan Crowley, have lined out at inter-county level with Cork and London respectively. His nephews David and Kevin Long also represented Cork and Newcestown at different levels as well as being part of the successful Carbery Senior Hurling winning squad. His Nephew Sean Power played at all levels for Dublin hurlers including the Seniors for over a decade.

== Honours ==
=== Player ===
St Finbarr's College

- Dr Croke Cup: 1969
- Dr Harty Cup: 1969

Bandon

- Cork Intermediate Hurling Championship: 1974
- Cork Junior Hurling Championship: 1971
- Cork Junior Football Championship: 1975
- South West Junior Hurling Championship: 1971
- South West Junior Football Championship: 1970, 1971, 1975
- South West Under-21 Hurling Championship: 1970, 1971, 1972
- South West Minor Hurling Championship: 1968, 1969 (c)

O'Donovan Rossa

- Cork Intermediate Football Championship: 1985

Carbery

- Cork Senior Football Championship: 1971

Cork

- Munster Senior Football Championship: 1974
- All-Ireland Junior Hurling Championship: 1983
- Munster Junior Hurling Championship: 1983
- All-Ireland Junior Football Championship: 1972
- Munster Junior Football Championship: 1972
- All-Ireland Under-21 Hurling Championship: 1971
- Munster Under-21 Hurling Championship: 1971
- All-Ireland Minor Hurling Championship: 1969, 1970
- Munster Minor Hurling Championship: 1969, 1970

=== Management ===
O'Donovan Rossa

- Cork Intermediate Football Championship: 1985

Carbery

- Cork Senior Hurling Championship: 1994
