= Mark Sugrue =

Irish Gaelic footballer

Personal information
- Native name: Marc Ó Siochrú (Irish)
- Born: 1993 (age 32–33) Bandon, County Cork, Ireland
- Occupation: Secondary school teacher
- Height: 6 ft 1 in (185 cm)

Sport
- Sport: Gaelic football
- Position: Right wing-forward
Clubs
- Years: Club
- Bandon → Carbery
Club titles
- Cork titles: 0
College
- Years: College
- University College Cork
College titles
- Fitzgibbon titles: 1
Inter-county*
| Years | County | Apps (scores) |
| 2014-2016 | Cork | 0 (0-00) |
Inter-county titles
- Munster titles: 0
- All-Irelands: 0
- NFL: 0
- All Stars: 0
- *Inter County team apps and scores correct as of 12:03, 1 May 2021.

Mark Sugrue (born 1993) is an Irish Gaelic footballer and hurler who plays for club side Bandon. He has also lined out with divisional side Carbery and at inter-county level with the Cork senior football team. He usually lines out in the forwards.

== Honours ==
University College Cork

- Fitzgibbon Cup: 2013

Bandon

- Cork Premier Intermediate Hurling Championship: 2016
- Cork Intermediate Football Championship: 2016
- Cork Intermediate Hurling Championship: 2011
- Cork Junior A Football Championship: 2015
- South West Junior A Football Championship: 2011, 2015

Cork

- McGrath Cup: 2014
- All-Ireland Intermediate Hurling Championship: 2014
- Munster Intermediate Hurling Championship: 2014
- All-Ireland Junior Football Championship: 2013
- Munster Junior Football Championship: 2013
- Munster Under-21 Football Championship: 2012, 2013, 2014
- Munster Minor Football Championship: 2010
