= 2015 Cork Junior A Football Championship =

117th staging of the Cork Junior A Football Championship

- Dates: 12 September – 25 October 2015
- Teams: 8
- Sponsor: Evening Echo
- Champions: Bandon (5th title); Pat Prendergast (captain); Colm Aherne (manager)
- Runners-up: Iveleary; Brian Cronin (captain)

Tournament statistics
- Matches played: 8
- Goals scored: 21 (2.63 per match)
- Points scored: 176 (22 per match)
- Top scorer(s): Mark Sugrue (4–18)

The 2015 Cork Junior A Football Championship was the 117th staging of the Cork Junior A Football Championship since its establishment by the Cork County Board. The draw for the opening fixtures took place on 14 December 2014. The championship ran from 12 September to 25 October 2015.

The final was played on 25 October 2015 at Páirc Uí Rinn in Cork, between Bandon and Iveleary, in what was their first meeting in the final in 86 years. Bandon won the match by 3–11 to 2–09 to claim their fifth championship title overall and a first title in 40 years.

Bandon's Mark Sugrue was the championship's top scorer with 4–18.

== Qualification ==
Division	Championship	Representatives
Avondhu	North Cork Junior A Football Championship	Ballyclough
Beara	Beara Junior A Football Championship	Urhan
Carbery	South West Junior A Football Championship	Bandon
Carrigdhoun	South East Junior A Football Championship	Ballinhassig
Duhallow	Duhallow Junior A Football Championship	Knocknagree
Imokilly	East Cork Junior A Football Championship	Fr. O'Neill's
Muskerry	Mid Cork Junior A Football Championship	Iveleary
Seandún	City Junior A Football Championship	Delaney Rovers

== Results ==
=== Quarter-finals ===
12 September 2015 Quarter-final	Ballyclough	2–07 – 1–05	Ballinhassig	Mourneabbey Grounds
	C O'Neill 1–3, T O'Shea 1–3, T O'Neill 0–1.		D O'Sullivan 0–4, C Reynolds 1–0, F O'Leary 0–1.	Referee: C Ó Murchú (Brian Dillons)

19 September 2015 Quarter-final	Iveleary	2–15 – 1–10	Urhan	Wolfe Tone Park
	B Cronin 2–5, C Vaughan 0–8, S Lehane 0–1, B O'Leary 0–1.		V Lehane 1–1, M O'Neill 0–2, C Harrington 0–2, P O'Shea 0–2, S O'Sullivan 0–1, F Dwyer 0–1, C Lowney 0–1.	Referee: F Quill (Bantry Blues)

26 September 2015 Quarter-final	Bandon	1–18 – 1–11	Delaney Rovers	Páirc Liam Mhic Cárthaigh
	M Sugrue 0–7, D Crowley 1–3, B Collins 0–5, P Crowley 0–2, R Crowley 0–1.		C McCarthy 0–6, D Quinlan 1–1, C Healy 0–2, D Ahern 0–1, J Hosford 0–1.	Referee: J Ryan (Macroom)

4 October 2015 Quarter-final	Knocknagre	1–19 – 1–05	Fr. O'Neill's	Mallow GAA Complex
	JF Daly 1–5, A O'Connor 0–5, M Dilworth 0–5, G O'Connor 0–1, K Daly 0–1, S Heelan 0–1, F O'Connor 0–1.		P Higgins 1–0, S Harrington 0–3, L Dunne 0–1, D Harrington 0–1.

=== Semi-finals ===
27 September 2015 Semi-final	Ballyclough	2–09 – 0–15	Iveleary	Dromtarriffe Grounds
	T O'Neill 1–2, C O'Neill 0–5, T O'Shea 1–0, A Finnegan 0–1, D Buckley 0–1.		B Cronin 0–6, C Vaughan 0–3, S Galvin 0–1, B O'Leary 0–1, G O'Riordan 0–1, K Manning 0–1, F McSweeney 0–1.	Referee: M O'Leary (Diarmuid Ó Mathúna's)

9 October 2015 Semi-final replay	Iveleary	2–15 – 0–07	Ballyclough	Mourneabbey Grounds
	C Vaughan 0–7, B Cronin 1–2, D O'Riordan 1–0, C Óg Jones 0–3, F McSweeney 0–1, B O'Leary 0–1, G McSweeney 0–1.		C O'Neill 0–3, T O'Shea 0–3, A Finnegan 0–1.	Referee: M O'Keeffe (Drotarriffe)

10 October 2015 Semi-final	Bandon	1–13 – 1–07	Knocknagree	Castle Grounds
	M Sugrue 1–7, B Collins 0–3, D Crowley 0–2, E O'Donovan 0–1.		P O'Connor 1–0, A O'Connor 0–3, JF Daly 0–1, M Dilworth 0–1, F O'Connor 0–1, J O'Keeffe 0–1.	Referee: T Hayes (Éire Óg)

=== Final ===
25 October 2015 Final	Bandon	3–11 – 2–09	Iveleary	Páirc Uí Rinn
	M Sugrue 3–4, B Collins 0–4, D Crowley 0–3.		C Vaughan 1–3, S Lehane 1–2, B Cronin 0–2, C Óg Jones 0–2.	Referee: B Coniry (Crosshaven)

== Championship Statistics ==
=== Top scorers ===
Overall

Rank	Player	Club	Tally	Total	Matches	Average
1	Mark Sugrue	Bandon	4–18	30	3	10.00
2	Brian Cronin	Iveleary	3–15	24	4	6.00
2	Cathal Vaughan	Iveleary	1–21	24	4	6.00
4	Colm O'Neill	Ballyclough	1–11	14	3	4.66
5	Teddy O'Shea	Ballyclough	2–06	12	3	4.00
5	Barry Collins	Bandon	0–12	12	3	4.00
7	Darren Crowley	Bandon	1–08	11	3	3.66
8	John Fintan Daly	Knocknagree	1–06	9	2	4.50
9	Anthony O'Connor	Knocknagree	0–08	8	2	4.00
10	Seán Lehane	Iveleary	1–03	6	4	1.50
10	Thomas O'Neill	Ballyclough	1–03	6	3	2.00
10	Ciarán McCarthy	Delaney Rovers	0–06	6	1	6.00
10	Matthew Dilworth	Knocknagree	0–06	6	2	3.00

In a single game

Rank	Player	Club	Tally	Total	Opposition
1	Mark Sugrue	Bandon	3–04	13	Iveleary
2	Brian Cronin	Iveleary	2–05	11	Urhan
3	Mark Sugrue	Bandon	1–07	10	Knocknagree
4	John Fintan Daly	KNocknagree	1–05	8	Fr. O'Neill's
4	Cathal Vaughan	Iveleary	0–08	8	Urhan
6	Mark Sugrue	Bandon	0–07	7	Delaney Rovers
6	Cathal Vaughan	Iveleary	0–07	7	Ballyclough
8	Colm O'Neill	Ballyclough	1–03	6	Ballinhassig
8	Teddy O'Shea	Ballyclough	1–03	6	Ballinhassig
8	Darren Crowley	Bandon	1–03	6	Delaney Rovers
8	Cathal Vaughan	Iveleary	1–03	6	Bandon
8	Brian Cronin	Iveleary	0–06	6	Ballyclough
8	Ciarán McCarthy	Delaney Rovers	0–06	6	Bandon
