= 2015 Cork Intermediate Football Championship =

80th staging of the Cork Intermediate Football Championship

- Sponsor: Evening Echo
- Champions: Fermoy (3rd title); Ruairí O'Hagan (captain); Noel Crowley (manager)
- Runners-up: Mayfield

The 2015 Cork Intermediate Football Championship was the 80th staging of the Cork Intermediate Football Championship since its establishment by the Cork County Board in 1909.

The final was played on 31 October 2015 at Páirc Uí Rinn in Cork, between Fermoy and Mayfield, in what was their first ever meeting in the final. Fermoy won the match, a replay, by 1–12 to 0–09 to claim their third championship title overall and a first title in 83 years.

== Results ==
=== Semi-finals ===
26 September 2015 Semi-final	Fermoy	1-08 - 0-06	Glanworth	Castlelyons Grounds
	T Clancy (1-1), R O’Hagan (1f), M Brennan, K Morrison (0-2 each), P de Róiste (0-1).	Report	D Pyne (0-3, 2f), M Sheehan (0-2, 1f), D Colfer (0-1)

10 October 2015 Semi-final	Mayfield	2-15 - 2-10	Kanturk	Castle Grounds
	P Condon 0-6(0-5f), N Kelly (1-2), T Lotty (1-2), D Hayes (0-2), S Fitzgerald, S Kelly, S O’Donovan 0-1 each.	Report	D O’Sullivan (2-0), K Holland 0-3f, I Walsh 0-3(0-2f), A Walsh(f), J Fitzpatrick, P Walsh, A Nash 0-1 each.

=== Final ===
25 October 2015 Final	Fermoy	0-07 - 0-07	Mayfield	Páirc Uí Rinn
	R O’Hagan (0-5, 2 frees); T Clancy, P de Roiste (0-1 each).	Report	P Condon (0-5, 3 frees, 1 45); K Brosnan, D O’Neill (0-1 each).	Referee: J Ryan (Macroom)

=== Final replay ===
31 October 2015 Final replay	Fermoy	1-12 - 0-09	Mayfield	Páirc Uí Rinn
	P de Roiste (1-1); R O’Hagan (0-3); T Clancy, A O’Connor (0-2 each); M Brennan, K Morrison, R O’Callaghan, D O’Carroll (0-1 each).	Report	P Condon (0-5, 4 frees); R Scannell, S O’Donovan, S Fitzgerald, D O’Neill (0-1 each).	Referee: D Murnane (Macroom)
