= Tim Crowley =

Irish hurler

Personal information
- Native name: Tadhg Ó Crualaoi (Irish)
- Nickname: Big Timmy
- Born: 14 May 1952 (age 74) Newcestown, County Cork, Ireland
- Occupation: Retired managing director
- Height: 6 ft 1 in (185 cm)

Sport
- Sport: Hurling
- Position: Centre-forward
Clubs
Years	Club	Apps (scores)
1969-1989 1970-1985	Newcestown → Carbery	20 (7-24)
Club titles
- Cork titles: 0
Inter-county*
Years	County	Apps (scores)
1973–1985	Cork	29 (2-23)
Inter-county titles
- Munster titles: 7
- All-Irelands: 3
- NHL: 2
- All Stars: 1
- *Inter County team apps and scores correct as of 22:09, 4 December 2013.

Timothy Crowley (born 14 May 1952) is an Irish former hurler. At club level he played with Newcestown and divisional side Carbery and was also a member of the Cork senior hurling team.

== Early life ==
Born and raised in Newcestown, County Cork, Crowley first played as a schoolboy in various local competitions before later lining out as a student at St Finbarr's College in Cork. His brother, Paddy Crowley, had been a member of the first St Finbarr's team to win the All-Ireland title in 1963, with Crowley himself claiming Harty Cup and All-Ireland titles in 1969.

== Club career ==
Crowley began his club career as a dual player at juvenile and underage levels with Newcestown. He was still eligible for the minor grade when he progressed onto the club's adult teams and won a South West JHC title in his debut season in 1969. Crowley also enjoyed club success as a Gaelic footballer when he was part of the Newcestown team that beat St. Finbarr's to win the Cork IFC title in 1971.

After winning a second divisional title in 1972, Crowley subsequently claimed a Cork JHC title after a defeat of Kildorrery in the final. He won two more divisional titles as the decade went on, while also lining out for the Carbery divisional team in the Cork SHC, before winning a second Cork JHC title after a defeat of Kilworth in the 1980 final. Crowley was part of both the Newcestown junior teams that completed a divisional double in 1988. He brought an end to his 20-year club career in 1989.

== Inter-county career ==
Crowley's performances as a schoolboy with St. Finbarr's College earned a call-up to the Cork minor hurling team for the 1969 Munster MHC. After securing the provincial title, he lined out at centre-forward for the defeat of Kilkenny in the 1969 All-Ireland minor final. Crowley was again eligible for the minor team the following year and won a second All-Ireland medal after beating Galway in the 1970 All-Ireland minor final.

After Gaelic football success at club level, he was drafted onto the Cork junior football team and was an unused substitute when the team beat Hertfordshire to win the 1972 All-Ireland junior final. In spite of this success, Crowley was overlooked by the Cork under-21 football team selectors but was at midfield on the Cork under-21 hurling team that beat Wexford in the 1973 All-Ireland under-21 final.

Crowley's performances with the under-21 team earned a call-up to the senior team for the 1973-74 National League. After appearing in Cork's first two group games he was later dropped from the panel before making a return during the 1976-77 National League. A broken ankle for Pat Moylan resulted in Crowley securing a place on the Cork team for their 1977 Munster SHC-winning campaign. After initially lining out at centre-forward, he spent the latter stages of the championship at millfield and it was in that position that he lined out in the 1-17 to 3-08 defeat of Wexford in the 1977 All-Ireland final.

Crowley won a second successive Munster SHC title in 1978 before claiming a second successive All-Ireland medal from left wing-forward in the 1-15 to 2-08 All-Ireland final defeat of Kilkenny. He brought his own personal tally of Munster medals to three in 1979, however, Cork later missed out on winning a fourth successive All-Ireland title. In spite of a lack of championship success over the following few seasons, Crowley went on to claim consecutive National League titles with the team in 1980 and 1981. He lined out in successive All-Ireland final defeats by Kilkenny in 1982 and 1983, with his performances in the former season earning him an All-Star award.

Cork qualified for a third successive All-Ireland final in 1984, with Crowley lining out at centre-forward in the 3-16 to 1-12 defeat of Offaly. He won a seventh and final provincial winners' medal in 1985, however, his inter-county career ended after a defeat by Galway in the subsequent All-Ireland semi-final.

== Honours ==
St. Finbarr's College

- Croke Cup: 1969
- Harty Cup: 1969

Newcestown

- Cork Intermediate Football Championship: 1971
- Cork Junior Hurling Championship: 1972, 1980
- South West Junior A Football Championship: 1988
- South West Junior A Hurling Championship: 1969, 1972, 1979, 1980, 1988

Cork

- All-Ireland Senior Hurling Championship: 1977, 1978, 1984
- Munster Senior Hurling Championship: 1977, 1978, 1979, 1981, 1982, 1984, 1985
- National Hurling League: 1979-80, 1980-81
- All-Ireland Junior Football Championship: 1972
- Munster Junior Football Championship: 1972
- All-Ireland Under-21 Hurling Championship: 1973
- Munster Under-21 Hurling Championship: 1973
- All-Ireland Minor Hurling Championship: 1969, 1970
- Munster Minor Hurling Championship: 1969, 1970

Munster

- Railway Cup: 1981
