= 1999 Cork Junior A Hurling Championship =

- Dates: 3 October – 21 November 1999
- Teams: 7
- Champions: Bandon (4th title); Donnacha Burke (captain)
- Runners-up: Courcey Rovers; Brian Hayes (captain)

Tournament statistics
- Matches played: 6
- Goals scored: 11 (1.83 per match)
- Points scored: 145 (24.17 per match)
- Top scorer(s): James Nyhan (1-12)

The 1999 Cork Junior A Hurling Championship was the 102nd staging of the Cork Junior A Hurling Championship since its establishment by the Cork County Board. The championship ran from 3 October 1999 to 21 November 1999.

The final was played on 21 November 1999 at Páirc Uí Chaoimh in Cork between Bandon and Courcey Rovers, in what was their first ever meeting in the final. Bandon won the match by 0-11 to 1-07 to claim their fourth championship title overall and a first title in 28 years.

Bandon's James Nyhan was the championship's top scorer with 1–12.

== Qualification ==
Division	Championship	Champions
Avondhu	North Cork Junior A Hurling Championship	Fermoy
Carbery	South West Junior A Hurling Championship	Bandon
Carrigdhoun	South East Junior A Hurling Championship	Courcey Rovers
Duhallow	Duhallow Junior A Hurling Championship	Kilbrin
Imokilly	East Cork Junior A Hurling Championship	Fr O'Neill's
Muskerry	Mid Cork Junior A Hurling Championship	Grenagh
Seandún	City Junior A Hurling Championship	Mayfield

== Results ==
=== First round ===
3 October 1999 First round	Mayfield	0-11 - 0-10	Kilbrin	Mallow
	A Murphy 0-7, E Crowley 0-3, K Hyland 0-1.		D Crowley 0-2, N O'Callaghan 0-2, W King 0-2, D Aherne 0-2, J Sheehan 0-1, S O'Riordan 0-2.

17 October 1999 First round	Fr O'Neill's	1-16 - 2-09	Fermoy	Páirc Lios gCúl
	L Swayne 1-6, J Ryan 0-3, J Holland 0-2, T Hurley 0-2, J Flavin 0-2, B O'Callaghan 0-1.		C O'Kane 1-4, J Aherne 1-0, D Higgins 0-2, S Killeen 0-2, B Kearney 0-1.

30 October 1999 First round	Bandon	2-20 - 0-18	Grenagh	Ballinhassig
	J Nyhan 1-5, D O'Donoghue 0-5, D Burke 0-4, A Johnson 1-0, J O'Regan 0-2, G O'Donovan 0-1, F O'Sullivan 0-1, A O'Donovan 0-1, K Hurley 0-1.		M Barry 0-7, S Coleman 0-3, A Dorgan 0-2, P McDonnell 0-2, M Kenny 0-1, J Russell 0-1, O Dennehy 0-1, T Kenny 0-1.

=== Semi-finals ===
24 October 1999 Semi-final	Courcey Rovers	1-10 - 0-10	Fr O'Neill's	Páirc Uí Rinn
	N Murphy 0-6, J Murphy 1-2, Denis Twomey 0-2.		L Swayne 0-3, J Flavin 0-3, A Brett 0-2, H Holland 0-1, J Ryan 0-1.

6 November 1999 Semi-final	Bandon	3-13 - 1-10	Mayfield	Páirc Liam Mhic Cárthaigh
	D Burke 2-3, J O'Regan 1-3, R Sweetnam 0-2, D O'Donoghue 0-2, J Nyhan 0-1, N O'Rourke 0-1, A Johnson 0-1.		A Murphy 0-7, T Lotty 1-0, B Collins 0-1, K Hyland 0-1, G Twohig 0-1.

=== Final ===
21 November 1999 Final	Bandon	0-11 - 1-07	Courcey Rovers	Páirc Uí Chaoimh
	J Nyhan 0-6, D O'Donoghue 0-3, G O'Donovan 0-1, D Burke 0-1.		J Hayes 0-5, J Murphy 1-0, N Murphy 0-1, D Twomey 0-1.

== Championship statistics ==
=== Top scorers ===
Rank	Player	Club	Tally	Total	Matches	Average
1	James Nyhan	Bandon	1-12	15	3	5.00
2	Donncha Burke	Bandon	2-08	14	3	4.66
2	Alan Murphy	Mayfield	0-14	14	2	7.00
4	Luke Swayne	Fr O'Neill's	1-09	12	2	6.00
5	Darren O'Donoghue	Bandon	0-10	10	3	3.33
6	John Murphy	Courcey Rovers	2-02	8	2	4.00
6	John O'Regan	Bandon	1-05	8	3	2.66
8	Conor O'Kane	Fermoy	1-04	7	1	7.00
8	Martin Barry	Grenagh	0-07	7	1	7.00
8	Niall Murphy	Courcey Rovers	0-07	7	2	3.50
