= Darren O'Donoghue =

Irish hurler

Personal information
- Native name: Darrin Ó Donnchú (Irish)
- Born: 1973 (age 52–53) Bandon, Cork, Ireland

Sport
- Sport: Hurling
- Position: Right wing-forward
Clubs
- Years: Club
- 1991-2012 1993-2004: Bandon → Carbery
Club titles
- Cork titles: 1
College
- Years: College
- University of Limerick
College titles
- Fitzgibbon titles: 1
Inter-county
Years	County	Apps (scores)
1994-1996	Cork	4 (0-05)
Inter-county titles
- Munster titles: 0
- All-Irelands: 0
- NHL: 0
- All Stars: 0

Darren J. O'Donoghue (born 1973) is an Irish retired hurler. At club level, he played with Bandon, divisional side Carbery, and at inter-county level he lined out with the Cork senior hurling team.

== Career ==
O'Donoghue played hurling and Gaelic football at all levels as a student at Hamilton High School in Bandon. He later studied at the University of Limerick and won a Fitzgibbon Cup medal in 1994 after UL's 2-12 to 1-11 win over Waterford RTC in the final.

At club level, O'Donoghue first played for Bandon as a dual player at juvenile and underage levels before progressing to adult level. His performances at club level earned a call-up to the Carbery divisional team and he won a Cork SHC medal in 1994 after a 3-13 to 3-06 win over Midleton in the final. With the Bandon club, he won two South West JAHC medals before claiming a Cork JAHC medal in 1999. O'Donoghue was joint-captain of the Bandon team that beat Fr O'Neill's to win the Cork IHC title in 2011.

At inter-county level, O'Donoghue first played for Cork in 1994. He was part of the under-21 and junior teams that year, before also making his senior team debut that year in a defeat by Limerick. After spending three years with senior team, O'Donoghue later won a Munster IHC medal in 1999.

== Honours ==
University of Limerick

- Fitzgibbon Cup: 1994

Bandon

- Cork Intermediate Hurling Championship: 2011 (c)
- Cork Junior A Hurling Championship: 1999
- South West Junior A Hurling Championship: 1995, 1999

Carbery

- Cork Senior Hurling Championship: 1994

Cork

- Munster Intermediate Hurling Championship: 1999
