= Colman O'Donovan =

Irish hurler (1927–2025)

Personal information
- Nickname: Colie
- Born: 1927 Midleton, County Cork, Ireland
- Died: 7 April 2025 (aged 97) Fermoy, County Cork, Ireland
- Occupation: Roman Catholic priest

Sport
- Sport: Hurling
- Position: Left corner-forward
Clubs
- Years: Club
- Midleton; Donoughmore
Club titles
- Cork titles: 0
Inter-county
Years	County	Apps (scores)
1951–1952	Cork	1 (0-00)
Inter-county titles
- Munster titles: 1
- All-Irelands: 1
- NHL: 0

Colman O'Donovan (1927 – 7 April 2025) was an Irish hurler. At club level, he played with Midleton and Donoughmore, and also lined out at inter-county level with various Cork teams.

== Career ==
O'Donovan first played hurling to a high standard as a student at St Colman's College in Fermoy. His performances in the Harty Cup resulted in a call-up to the Cork minor hurling team in 1945. O'Donovan later lined out with the junior team and won an All-Ireland JHC medal in 1950 in spite of not playing in the final against London. He later progressed to the senior team and made his only championship appearance at left corner-forward in an All-Ireland semi-final defeat of Galway in 1952. O'Donovan lost his place on the team for the subsequent All-Ireland final, but was presented with a winners' medal after the 2–14 to 0–07 defeat of Dublin.

== Personal life and death ==
O'Donovan was ordained to the priesthood at St Patrick's College in 1953. His first posting was to England. He returned to Ireland in 1954 and spent seven years in Mallow, leaving in 1961 to take up duty in Donoughmore. In 1969, he moved to Glantane where he ministered for 14 years until a move to Youghal in 1983. After six years here, O'Donovan was moved to Inniscarra. He retired after celebrating his golden jubilee in 2003. O'Donovan later became vice-president of Midleton GAA Club.

O'Donovan died on 7 April 2025, at the age of 97.

== Honours ==
Cork

- All-Ireland Senior Hurling Championship: 1952
- Munster Senior Hurling Championship: 1952
- All-Ireland Junior Hurling Championship: 1950
- Munster Junior Hurling Championship: 1950
