= Patrick Kavanagh (disambiguation) =

Patrick Kavanagh (1904–1967) was an Irish poet.

Patrick Kavanagh is also the name of:

- Patrick Kavanagh (police officer) (1923–2013), British police officer
- P. J. Kavanagh (1931–2015), English poet, writer and actor
- Pat Kavanagh (ice hockey) (born 1979), ice hockey player
- Pat Kavanagh (agent) (1940–2008), British literary agent
- Patrick Kavanagh (footballer, born 1985), Irish football player for Shelbourne
- Patrick Kavanagh (Olympic footballer) (died 1993), Irish Olympic football player
- Pat Kavanagh (Kilkenny hurler), retired Irish hurler
- Pat Kavanagh (Cork hurler) (born 1952), Irish Gaelic footballer and hurler
- Patrick Kavanagh (rugby union) (1929–2015), Irish rugby union player
- Pat Kavanagh, former Irish Green Party councillor and member of the Fís Nua political party
- Pat Kavanagh (born 1983), bass player for metal bands Threat Signal and Arkaea
- Patrick Ryan Grossmann-Kavanagh, an American entrepreneur known for founding the cryptocurrency business at Robinhood and co-founding Atlantic Money

== See also ==
- Patrick Cavanagh (died 1581), Irish Catholic martyr
- Patrick Cavanaugh, American television actor, active since 1999
- Patrick Kavanaugh (1954–2018) composer
- Patrick Kavanagh Poetry Award
