= 1980 Cork Junior Hurling Championship =

Irish hurling competition

- Dates: 28 September - 16 November 1980
- Teams: 7
- Champions: Newcestown (2nd title); Seán McCarthy (captain)
- Runners-up: Kilworth; Dave Horgan (captain)

Tournament statistics
- Matches played: 7
- Goals scored: 24 (3.43 per match)
- Points scored: 143 (20.43 per match)
- Top scorer(s): Tim Crowley (2-19)

The 1980 Cork Junior Hurling Championship was the 83rd staging of the Cork Junior Hurling Championship since its establishment by the Cork County Board. The championship ran from 28 September to 16 November 1980.

On 16 November 1980, Newcestown won the championship following a 1–12 to 2–06 defeat of Kilworth in the final at Páirc Uí Chaoimh. This was their second championship title overall and their first title since 1972.

Newcestown's Tim Crowley was the championship's top scorer with 2-19.

== Results ==
=== Quarter-finals ===
| 28 September 1980 Quarter-final | Newcestown | 2-14 - 1-08 | Blarney | Cloughduv GAA Grounds |
| | T Crowley 1-8, N Collins 1-2, J O'Leary 0-1, J Collins 0-1, P O'Neill 0-1, C O'Donovan 0-1. | | J O'Leary 1-1, S Coakley 0-3, C O'Mahony 0-2, K O'Connor 0-1, D Buckley 0-1. |

| 28 September 1980 Quarter-final | Shamrocks | 3-19 - 2-04 | Meelin | Cloughduv GAA Grounds |
| | Dineen 2-1, E Hanley 1-4, D Hanley 0-6, W Ashman 0-4, JJ Shanahan 0-2, J Murphy 0-1, C Twomey 0-1. | | B O'Connor 1-1, D Buckley 1-0, N Brosnan 0-2, J Browne 0-1. | Referee: M Lenihan (Inniscarra) |

| 5 October 1980 Quarter-final | Kilworth | 1-10 - 1-10 | Delaneys | Castlelyons GAA Grounds |
| | J Kenny 0-6, J Hogan 1-0, P Flynn 0-2, C O'Callaghan 0-1, D McCarthy 0-1. | | P O'Sullivan 0-4, M McNamara 1-0 (og), P O'Connell 0-2, J Hallahan 0-2, R Barry 0-2. |

| 19 October 1980 Quarter-final replay | Kilworth | 2-11 - 2-08 | Delaneys | Castlelyons GAA Grounds |
| | F McCormack 1-1, P Greehy 0-4, C O'Callaghan 1-0, J Kenny 0-3, J Hogan 0-2, P Flynn 0-1. | | P O'Sullivan 1-4, R Barry 1-1, E Murphy 0-1, J Hallahan 0-1, M Sloane 0-1. |

=== Semi-finals ===
| 12 October 1980 Semi-final | Newcestown | 1-15 - 2-08 | Shamrocks | Páirc Uí Chaoimh |
| | T Crowley 0-9, C O'Donovan 1-0, N Collins 0-2, P O'Neill 0-1, M McCarthy 0-1, J Collins 0-1, J O'Leary 0-1. | | E Hanley 1-2, G Manley 1-2, C Twomey 0-2, J Twomey 0-1, W Ashman 0-1. | Referee: M O'Flaherty |

| 9 November 1980 Semi-final | Kilworth | 2-11 - 2-07 | Aghada | Riverstown Sportsfield |
| | J Hogan 1-1, P Shanahan 1-1, J Kenny 0-4, P Greehy 0-3, McCarthy 0-1, P Flynn 0-1. | | P O'Brien 2-0, P Aherne 0-5, C Counihan 0-1, A Aherne 0-1. | Referee: M English |

=== Final ===
| 16 November 1980 Final | Newcestown | 1-12 - 2-06 | Kilworth | Páirc Uí Chaoimh |
| | T Crowley 1-2, D O'Leary 0-3, N Collins 0-2, P Collins 0-2, K Kehilly 0-1, P Ryan 0-1, C O'Donovan 0-1. | | P Shanahan 1-1, J Hogan 1-0, P Greehy 0-2, J Kenny 0-2, P O'Flynn 0-1. | Referee: M Flaherty |

== Championship statistics ==
=== Top scorers ===
Overall

| Rank | Player | Club | Tally | Total | Matches | Average |
|---|---|---|---|---|---|---|
| 1 | Tim Crowley | Newcestown | 2-19 | 25 | 3 | 8.33 |
| 2 | John Kenny | Kilworth | 0-15 | 15 | 3 | 5.00 |
| 3 | Eddie Hanley | Shamrocks | 2-06 | 12 | 2 | 6.00 |

In a single game

| Rank | Player | Club | Tally | Total | Opposition |
|---|---|---|---|---|---|
| 1 | Tim Crowley | Newcestown | 1-08 | 11 | Blarney |
| 2 | Tim Crowley | Newcestown | 0-09 | 9 | Shamrocks |
| 3 | John Dineen | Shamrocks | 2-01 | 7 | Meelin |
| 3 | Eddie Hanley | Shamrocks | 1-04 | 7 | Meelin |
| 3 | Pat O'Sullivan | Delaneys | 1-04 | 7 | Kilworth |
| 6 | Pat O'Brien | Aghada | 2-00 | 6 | Kilworth |
| 6 | Ger Hanley | Shamrocks | 0-06 | 6 | Meelin |
| 6 | John Kenny | Kilworth | 0-06 | 6 | Delaneys |
