= Ronan Crowley =

Irish hurler

Personal information
- Native name: Rónán Ó Crualaoich (Irish)
- Born: 1990 (age 35–36) Bandon, County Cork, Ireland
- Occupation: Cardiac radiographer

Sport
- Sport: Hurling
- Position: Left corner-forward
Clubs
- Years: Club
- Bandon → Carbery; St Peter's; Robert Emmetts
Club titles
- London titles: 1
Inter-county
- Years: County
- 2017–2020 2021–: Lancashire; London
Inter-county titles
- Munster titles: 0
- All-Irelands: 0
- NHL: 0
- All Stars: 0

Ronan Crowley (born 1990) is an Irish hurler who plays as a left corner-forward at inter-county level for the Lancashire senior team.

Born in Bandon, County Cork, Crowley first played competitive hurling and Gaelic football at St Brogan's College. He simultaneously came to prominence at juvenile and underage levels with the Bandon club, winning divisional championship medals in the minor and under-21 grades. Crowley subsequently enjoyed success with the Bandon adult team, winning an intermediate championship medal in 2011 and a premier intermediate championship medal in 2016. He currently plays with St Peter's in Manchester.

Crowley made his debut on the inter-county scene at the age of seventeen when he was selected for the Cork minor team. He enjoyed one championship season with the minor team, culminating with the winning of a Munster medal. He subsequently joined the Cork intermediate team, winning an All-Ireland medal in 2014. Crowley made his senior debut with the Lancashire senior team during the 2017 Lory Meagher Cup.

== Career statistics ==
As of match played 14 May 2022

Team	Year	National League			Ring Cup		Meagher Cup		Total	
Team	Year	Division	Apps	Score	Apps	Score	Apps	Score	Apps	Score
Lancashire	2017	N/A	—		—		5	3–57	5	3–57
Lancashire	2018	Division 3B	5	4–62	—		4	2-46	9	6–108
Lancashire	2019	Division 3A	4	1–35	—		4	2–47	8	3–82
Lancashire	2020	Division 3B	2	0–2	—		—		2	0–2
Lancashire	Total		11	5–99	—		13	7–150	24	12–249
London	2021	Division 2B	—		—		—		—	
London	2022	Division 2B	4	0–16	2	0–15	—		6	0–31
London	Total		4	0–16	2	0–15	—		6	0–31
Career total			15	5–115	2	0–15	13	7–150	30	12–280

== Honours ==
Bandon

- Cork Premier Intermediate Hurling Championship: 2016
- Cork Intermediate Football Championship: 2016
- Cork Intermediate Hurling Championship: 2011
- Cork Junior A Football Championship: 2015

Robert Emmetts

- London Senior Hurling Championship: 2021

Cork

- All-Ireland Intermediate Hurling Championship: 2014
- Munster Intermediate Hurling Championship: 2014
- Munster Minor Hurling Championship: 2008

Lancashire

- National Hurling League Division 3B: 2018

Awards

- 2017 Lory Meagher Cup: Champions 15
