= 1953 Cork Junior Football Championship =

Irish hurling competition

- Champions: Bandon (3rd title)
- Runners-up: Glanworth

The 1953 Cork Junior Football Championship was the 55th staging of the Cork Junior Football Championship since its establishment by the Cork County Board in 1895.

The final was played on 15 November 1953 at the Athletic Grounds in Cork, between Bandon and Glanworth, in what was their first ever meeting in the final. Bandon won the match by 1–04 to 1–02 to claim their third championship title overall and a third championship title in 24 years.

== Results ==
=== Final ===
15 November 1953 Final	Bandon	1–04 – 1–02	Glanworth	Cork Athletic Grounds
