= 1952 Cork Junior Football Championship =

Irish hurling competition

- Champions: Castlemagner (1st title); N. Fitzgerald (captain)
- Runners-up: Bandon; J. Collins (captain)

The 1952 Cork Junior Football Championship was the 54th staging of the Cork Junior Football Championship since its establishment by the Cork County Board in 1895.

The final was played on 30 November 1952 at the Athletic Grounds in Cork, between Castlemagner and Bandon, in what was their first ever meeting in the final. Castlemagner won the match by 1–07 to 1–05 to claim their first ever championship title.

== Results ==
=== Final ===
30 November 1952 Final	Castlemagner	1–07 – 1–05	Bandon	Cork Athletic Grounds
