= 2011 Cork Intermediate Hurling Championship =

Irish hurling competition

- Dates: 27 May 2011 – 2 October 2011
- Teams: 16
- Sponsor: Evening Echo
- Champions: Bandon (3rd title); Eoghan O'Donovan (captain); Darren O'Donoghue (captain); Teddy McCarthy (manager)
- Runners-up: Fr. O'Neill's; John O'Mahony (captain); Robbie Dalton (manager)
- Relegated: Cobh

Tournament statistics
- Matches played: 30
- Goals scored: 66 (2.2 per match)
- Points scored: 798 (26.6 per match)
- Top scorer(s): Ronan Crowley (1-39)

The 2011 Cork Intermediate Hurling Championship was the 102nd staging of the Cork Intermediate Hurling Championship since its establishment by the Cork County Board in 1909. The draw for the opening round fixtures took place on 12 December 2010. The championship began on 27 May 2011 and ended on 2 October 2011.

On 2 October 2011, Bandon won the championship following a 2-14 to 0-07 defeat of Fr. O'Neill's in the final at Páirc Uí Chaoimh. This was their third championship title overall and their first title since 1974.

Bandon's Ronan Crowley was the championship's top scorer with 1-39.

== Team changes ==
=== To Championship ===
Promoted from the Cork Junior A Hurling Championship

- Meelin

Relegated from the Cork Premier Intermediate Hurling Championship

- Fr. O'Neill's

=== From Championship ===
Promoted to the Cork Premier Intermediate Hurling Championship

- Kilbrittain

Relegated to the City Junior A Hurling Championship

- St. Vincent's

== Results ==
=== First round ===
27 May 2011 First round	Aghada	0-11 - 3-13	Ballygarvan	Páirc Uí Rinn
	T O'Keeffe 0-4, C Fleming 0-3, E Savage 0-2, JP O'Connor 0-1, W Leahy 0-1.		M Kennefick 0-8, D McCarthy 2-1, K Ashman 1-1, S White 0-2, T Quilligan 0-1.

3 June 2011 First round	Cobh	2-07 - 0-16	Fermoy	Páirc Lios gCúl
	C Spriggs 2-2, B Aherne 0-2, S Ryan 0-1, L Greaney 0-1, A O'Rourke 0-1.		J Hutchings 0-6, T Clancy 0-4, D Murphy 0-1, P Shanahan 0-1, M Flynn 0-1, R O'Callaghan 0-1, T Gumbridge 0-1, J O'Sullivan 0-1.

4 June 2011 First round	St. Catherine's	1-11 - 1-17	Bandon	Church Road
	K Dineen 0-5, B Mulcahy 1-1, S Kearney 0-2, P Roche 0-2, P O'Neill 0-1.		R Crowley 0-11, J McCarthy 1-1, D Crowley 0-2, J Hickey 0-1, E O'Donovan 0-1, R Payne 0-1.

4 June 2011 First round	Fr. O'Neill's	4-16 - 2-20 (aet)	Meelin	Mallow GAA Complex
	E Conway 1-6, G O'Leary 0-8, B Murphy 2-0, K Hegarty 1-0, E Holland 0-2.		E Brosnan 1-10, J O'Callaghan 1-0, J Curtin 0-3, L Collins 0-2, W Murphy 0-2, DJ O'Sullivan 0-1, S O'Riordan 0-1, W Buckley 0-1.

4 June 2011 First round	Barryroe	0-11 - 1-11	Dripsey	Cloughduv
	K Griffin 0-6, A Fleming 0-2, T Harrington 0-2, J O'Donovan 0-1.		D O'Sullivan 0-4, A Buckley 1-0, M O'Sullivan 0-3, D Buckley 0-2, S Burke 0-1, G Murphy 0-1.

5 June 2011 First round	Kilworth	1-17 - 1-10	Blackrock	Rathcormac
	P Lynch 0-9, N McNamara 1-0, B Tobin 0-2, S O'Brien 0-2, N O'Brien 0-1, L Whelan 0-1, D McNamara 0-1, W Condon 0-1.		E O'Farrell 0-4, A Browne 1-0, M Drummond 0-2, G Magnier 0-2, K O'Keeffe 0-2.

10 June 2011 First round	Milford	2-11 - 0-24	Éire Óg	Mourne Abbey
	P O'Regan 2-2, E Dillon 0-6, J O'Brien 0-1, S O'Connell 0-1, M O'Connell 0-1.		J Dineen 0-7, C Sheehan 0-7, D Goulding 0-6, EC Murphy 0-2, F O'Rourke 0-1, J Crowley 0-1.

11 June 2011 First round	Dromina	1-12 - 0-21	Kanturk	Páirc Mhic Ghiobúin
	A O'Shaughnessy 0-5, J Jordan 1-0, P Hayes 0-3, G Hayes 0-1, M Naughton 0-1, J Hamilton 0-1, J Finn 0-1.		L McLoughlin 0-10, A Walsh 0-4, J Healy 0-4, W Burke 0-1, I Walsh 0-1, A Nash 0-1.

=== Second round ===
17 June 2011 Second round	Aghada	2-13 - 0-15	Blackrock	Clonmult Memorial Park
	T O'Keeffe 0-5, P O'Neill 1-0, W Leahy 1-0, T Wall 0-3, C Fleming 0-3, E Healy 0-2.		M Ahern 0-7, D Gosnell 0-4, A Browne 0-2, M Drummond 0-1, C Kilcoyne 0-1.

17 June 2011 Second round	Dromina	2-07 - 2-15	Meelin	Fr. Kelleher Park
	A O'Shaughnessy 2-5, M Naughten 0-1, J Delea 0-1.		E Brosnan 2-11, L Collins 0-2, J Curtin 0-1, J O'Callaghan 0-1.

19 June 2011 Second round	Cobh	1-15 - 0-19	St. Catherine's	Jamesy Kelleher Park
	B Ahern 0-9, W Drake 1-0, E Wilson 0-2, L Greaney 0-1, A Walley 0-1, C Spriggs 0-1, M O'Connor 0-1.		K Dineen 0-8, K Morrison 0-4, D Mangan 0-4, S Kearney 0-1, P Roche 0-1, S Fitzgerald 0-1.

26 June 2011 Second round	Milford	0-15 - 4-07	Barryroe	Coachford Sportsfield
	E Dillon 0-5, P O'Regan 0-2, S O'Connell 0-2, D Hannigan 0-1, J Cremin 0-1, T Flynn 0-1, M O'Connell 0-1, L Kenneally 0-1, P O'Brien 0-1.		M O'Brien 2-1, K Griffin 0-5, J O'Donovan 1-0, P Fleming 1-0, D o'Sullivan 0-1.

=== Third round ===
2 July 2011 Third round	Dromina	3-09 - 1-17	Blackrock	Mallow GAA Complex
	P Hayes 2-2, J Finn 1-0, A O'Shaughnessy 0-3, M Naughton 0-1, G Hayes 0-1, J Delee 0-1, J Jordan 0-1.		S O'Keeffe 1-5, A Browne 0-4, G Magnier 0-3, M Donoghue 0-2, C Kilcoyne 0-1, D Cremin 0-1, D Gosnell 0-1.

2 July 2011 Third round	Cobh	1-06 - 2-13	Milford	Páirc Uí Rinn
	A O'Rourke 1-1, B Aherne 0-3, E Wilson 0-1, S Ryan 0-1.		S O'Connell 0-7, T Flynn 1-2, P O'Brien 1-0, P Kirwan 0-2, B Geary 0-1, R Villiers 0-1.

=== Relegation playoff ===
31 July 2011 Relegation playoff	Dromina	2-11 - 1-11	Cobh	Castletownroche
	P Hayes 0-6, J Finn 1-1, J Hamilton 1-0, A O'Shaughnessy 0-3, J Delee 0-1.		B Aherne 0-6, G Meaney 1-0, C Spriggs 0-2, A O'Rourke 0-2, E Wilson 0-1.

=== Fourth round ===
23 July 2011 Fourth round	Fermoy	0-15 - 1-17	Milford	Kildorrery
	B O'Sullivan 0-12, J Hutchings 0-1, A O'Connor 0-1, K Morrison 0-1.		S O'Connell 0-7, S Carroll 1-2, A Watson 0-3, E Dillon 0-2, T Flynn 0-1, P O'Regan 0-1, P Kirwan 0-1.

23 July 2011 Fourth round	St. Catherine's	0-13 - 1-10	Blackrock	Clonmult Memorial Park
	K Dineen 0-7, B Mulcahy 0-2, K Morrison 0-1, S Kearney 0-1, S Cotter 0-1, R O'Connell 0-1.		D Gosnell 0-7, P Deasy 1-1, S O'Keeffe 0-1, M O'Donoghue 0-1.

6 August 2011 Fourth round	Kilworth	1-17 - 1-18	Kanturk	Páirc Mhic Ghiobúin
	L Whelan 1-4, N McNamara 0-7, S O'Brien 0-1, B Tobin 0-1, W Condon 0-1, N Byrne 0-1, J Moakley 0-1, J Cahill 0-1.		A Walsh 1-8, L McLoughlin 0-8, D Kenneally 0-1, C Burke 0-1.

6 August 2011 Fourth round	Bandon	2-12 - 2-11	Dripsey	Brinny Sportsfield
	R Crowley 1-6, M Sugrue 1-0, R Payne 0-2, J McCarthy 0-2, D Crowley 0-1, C Dullea 0-1.		D O'Riordan 0-7, P O'Riordan 1-0, G Murphy 1-0, M O'Sullivan 0-2, D O'Sullivan 0-1, A Buckley 0-1.

7 August 2011 Fourth round replay	St. Catherine's	2-16 - 2-10	Blackrock	Clonmult Memorial Park
	B Mulcahy 1-2, P Cotter 1-1, D Mangan 0-4, R O'Connell 0-3, S Cotter 0-2, P Roche 0-2, K Morrison 0-1, S Kearney 0-1.		P Deasy 0-8, D Moran 2-0, C Kilcoyne 0-1, P Bennett 0-1.

7 August 2011 Fourth round	Barryroe	0-15 - 1-11	Éire Óg	Brinny Sportsfield
	K Griffin 0-6, M O'Brien 0-3, P Collins 0-1, A Fleming 0-1, J O'Donovan 0-1, K McCarthy 0-1, D Harrington 0-1, G Coleman 0-1.		J Dineen 0-4, M O'Shea 1-0, E Murphy 0-3, K Hallissey 0-2, J Malone 0-1, T O'Leary 0-1.

14 August 2011 Fourth round	Meelin	0-14 - 1-14	Aghada	Mallow GAA Complex
	E Brosnan 0-5, J Forrest 0-4, S O'Riordan 0-2, DJ O'Sullivan 0-1, C Murphy 0-1, W Murphy 0-1.		T O'Keeffe 0-7, T Wall 1-1, G Melvin 0-2, P O'Neill 0-2, W Leahy 0-1, C Fleming 0-1.

- Fr. O'Neill's and Ballygarvan received byes in this round.

=== Quarter-finals ===
6 August 2011 Quarter-final	Fr. O'Neill's	2-21 - 2-15	Ballygarvan	Riverstown
	G O'Leary 2-10, E Conway 0-5, E Holland 0-3, R Cullinane 0-1, J O'Driscoll 0-1, W Joyce 0-1.		M Kennefick 2-6, G White 0-3, M O'Callaghan 0-2, G Spillane 0-2, D McCarthy 0-1, K Ashman 0-1.

14 August 2011 Quarter-final	Kanturk	0-12 - 1-14	St. Catherine's	Castletownroche
	L McLoughlin 0-6, A Walsh 0-2, J Healy 0-2, D Kenneally 0-1, M O'Riordan 0-1.		P Roche 1-4, K Dineen 0-6, S Kearney 0-2, R O'Connell 0-1, B Mulcahy 0-1.

14 August 2011 Quarter-final	Barryroe	1-07 - 0-11	Milford	Páirc Uí Rinn
	K Griffin 0-4, C Healy 1-0, A Fleming 0-1, D Harrington 0-1, M O'Brien 0-1.		S O'Connell 0-5, E Dillon 0-3, T Flynn 0-1, P O'Regan 0-1, H O'Gorman 0-1.

21 August 2011 Quarter-final	Aghada	0-12 - 0-12	Bandon	Church Road
	T O'Keeffe 0-6, C Fleming 0-3, P O'Neill 0-1, T O'Neill 0-1, S Wall 0-1.		R Crowley 0-4, D Crowley 0-2, M Sugrue 0-2, D Lucey 0-1, J McCarthy 0-1, R Payne 0-1, A Johnson 0-1.

3 September 2011 Quarter-final	Aghada	0-10 - 1-20	Bandon	Páirc Uí Rinn
	T O'Keeffe 0-6, C Fleming 0-1, G Melvin 0-1, S Wall 0-1, P O'Neill 0-1.		R Crowley 0-7, M Sugrue 0-5, N O'Rourke 1-1, N Paghan 0-4, E O'Donovan 0-1, A Johnson 0-1, J Harrington 0-1.

=== Semi-finals ===
3 September 2011 Semi-final	Fr. O'Neill's	2-15 - 0-18	Milford	Páirc Uí Rinn
	E Conway 2-4, G O'Leary 0-7, L Swayne 0-2, E Holland 0-1, W Joyce 0-1.		S O'Connell 0-6, T Flynn 0-2, H O'Gorman 0-2, E Dillon 0-2, L Kenneally 0-1, P O'Regan 0-1, A Watson 0-1, S Carroll 0-1, R Villiers 0-1, P O'Brien 0-1.

10 September 2011 Semi-final	Bandon	1-11 - 1-05	St. Catherine's	Páirc Uí Rinn
	R Crowley 0-5, A Johnson 1-0, J Hickey 0-2, J McCarthy 0-2, R Payne 0-1, N O'Rourke 0-1.		S Kearney 1-0, D Mangan 0-2, S Colfer 0-1, R Clancy 0-1, K Morrison 0-1.

=== Final ===
2 October 2011 Final	Bandon	2-14 - 0-07	Fr. O'Neill's	Páirc Uí Chaoimh
	J McCarthy 2-0, R Crowley 0-6 (2fs, 1 65), J Hickey 0-3, D Crowley, M Sugrue 0-2 each, P Payne 0-1.	Report	L Swayne, B Murphy 0-2 each, N Griffin, G O’Leary, E McCarthy 0-1 each.	Referee: D Kirwan (Éire Óg)

== Championship statistics ==
=== Top scorers ===
Overall

Rank	Player	Club	Tally	Total	Matches	Average
1	Ronan Crowley	Bandon	1-39	42	6	7.00
2	Éamonn Brosnan	Meelin	3-26	35	3	11.66
3	Ger O'Leary	Fr. O'Neill's	2-26	32	4	8.00
4	Trevor O'Keeffe	Aghada	0-28	28	5	5.60
4	Seánie O'Connell	Milford	0-28	28	6	4.66
5	Kevin Dineen	St. Catherine's	0-26	26	4	6.50
6	Eoin Conway	Fr. O'Neill's	3-15	24	4	6.00
6	Lorcán McLoughlin	Kanturk	0-24	24	3	8.00
6	Andrew O'Shaughnessy	Dromina	2-16	22	4	5.50
7	Kieran Griffin	Barryroe	0-21	21	4	5.25

In a single game

Rank	Player	Club	Tally	Total	Opposition
1	Éamonn Brosnan	Meelin	2-11	17	Dromina
2	Ger O'Leary	Fr. O'Neill's	2-10	16	Ballygarvan
3	Éamonn Brosnan	Meelin	1-10	13	Fr. O'Neill's
4	Mark Kennefick	Ballygarvan	2-06	12	Fr. O'Neill's
4	Brian O'Sullivan	Fermoy	0-12	12	Milford
5	Andrew O'Shaughnessy	Dromina	2-05	11	Meelin
5	Aidan Walsh	Kanturk	1-08	11	Kilworth
5	Ronan Crowley	Bandon	0-11	11	St. Catherine's
6	Eoin Conway	Fr. O'Neill's	2-04	10	Milford
6	Lorcán McLoughlin	Kanturk	0-10	10	Dromina
