= 1971 Cork Junior Hurling Championship =

Irish hurling competition

- Dates: 24 October - 12 December 1971
- Teams: 7
- Champions: Bandon (3rd title); Ted Buston (captain)
- Runners-up: Ballinhassig; Noel Cullinane (captain)

Tournament statistics
- Matches played: 8
- Goals scored: 52 (6.5 per match)
- Points scored: 113 (14.13 per match)
- Top scorer(s): Derry Coleman (5-14)

The 1971 Cork Junior Hurling Championship was the 74th staging of the Cork Junior Hurling Championship since its establishment by the Cork County Board. The championship ran from 24 October to 12 December 1971.

On 12 December 1971, Bandon won the championship following a 3-12 to 4-05 defeat of Ballinhassig in the final at Ballinspittle GAA Grounds. This was their third championship title overall and their first title since 1949.

Ballinhassig's Derry Coleman was the championship's top scorer with 5-14.

== Results ==
=== Quarter-finals ===
| 24 October 1971 Quarter-final | Killeagh | 4-11 - 3-06 | Kilworth | Páirc Mac Gearilt |
| | J Foley 3-3, D Barry 1-0, N Treacy 0-3, T Barry 0-3, J Barry 0-1., J Moloney 0-1. | | F Sheedy 1-2, D Condon 1-1, C O'Callaghan 1-0, J Hogan 0-1, J Carey 0-1, T O'Halloran 0-1. |

| 31 October 1971 Quarter-final | Bandon | 6-10 - 2-07 | Meelin | Castle Grounds |
| | R Crowley 5-1, N Crowley 0-7, F Crowley 1-0, L Ryan 0-2. | | B Buckley 1-5, T Lenihan 1-0, P Connors 0-1, P Buckley 0-1. |

| 31 October 1971 Quarter-final | Ballinhassig | 4-05 - 5-02 | Éire Óg | Kinsale GAA Grounds |
| | JK Coleman 2-1, D Coleman 1-1, R Cullinane 1-0, J Murphy 0-1, O Jordan 0-1. | | M Malone 2-0, J O'Leary 1-, D O'Brien 1-0, P O'Brien 1-0, L O'Leary 0-1. |

| 7 November 1971 Quarter-final replay | Ballinhassig | 5-05 - 1-10 | Éire Óg | Kinsale GAA Grounds |
| | JK Coleman 2-0, Derry Coleman 1-3, R Cullinane 1-0, J Murphy 1-0, Dec Coleman 0-1. | | D O'Brien 1-7, M Malone 0-1, L O'Leary 0-1, C Malone 0-1. |

=== Semi-finals ===
| 14 November 1971 Semi-final | Bandon | 3-07 - 3-06 | Killeagh | Ballinhassig GAA Grounds |
| | P Harrington 1-1, R Crowley 1-1, G Gabriel 1-0, F Crowley 0-2, D McCarthy 0-1, N Crowley 0-1. | | M McCarthy 1-0, T Barry 0-4, P Barry 0-1, |

| 21 November 1971 Semi-final | Ballinhassig | 4-04 - 2-10 | Mayfield | Tracton GAA Grounds |
| | J Murphy 2-0, D Coleman 1-3, JK Coleman 1-0, JL O'Sullivan 0-1. | | T McAuliffe 0-6, M McCarthy 1-0, J McMahon 1-0, V Twomey 0-2, M Flynn 0-1, J Nodwell 0-1. |

| 28 November 1971 Semi-final replay | Ballinhassig | 3-05 - 0-08 | Mayfield | Tracton GAA Grounds |
| | D Coleman 1-4, R Cullinane 1-0, J Reynolds 1-0, J O'Sullivan 0-1. | | V Twomey 0-3, T McAuliffe 0-3, J Atkins 0-1, J Nodwell 0-1. |

=== Final ===
| 12 December 1971 Final | Bandon | 3-12 - 4-05 | Ballinhassig | Ballinspittle GAA Grounds |
| | L Ryan 2-2, N Ryan 0-5, F McCarthy 1-0, R Crowley 0-3, P Harrington 0-1, F Long 0-1. | | JK Coleman 1-2, Derry Coleman 1-3, Dec Coleman 1-0, JL O'Sullivan 1-0. | Referee: F Murphy (Blackrock) |

== Championship statistics ==
=== Top scorers ===
Overall

| Rank | Player | Club | Tally | Total | Matches | Average |
|---|---|---|---|---|---|---|
| 1 | Derry Coleman | Ballinhassig | 5-14 | 29 | 5 | 5.80 |
| 2 | Red Crowley | Bandon | 6-05 | 23 | 3 | 7.66 |
| 3 | John Kevin Coleman | Ballinhassig | 6-03 | 21 | 5 | 4.20 |
| 4 | Dinny O'Brien | Éire Óg | 2-07 | 13 | 2 | 6.50 |
| 5 | Jim Foley | Killeagh | 3-03 | 12 | 2 | 6.00 |

In a single game

| Rank | Player | Club | Tally | Total | Opposition |
|---|---|---|---|---|---|
| 1 | Red Crowley | Bandon | 5-01 | 16 | Meelin |
| 2 | Jim Foley | Killeagh | 3-03 | 12 | Kilworth |
| 3 | Dinny O'Brien | Éire Óg | 1-07 | 10 | Ballinhassig |
| 4 | Liam Ryan | Bandon | 2-02 | 8 | Ballinhassig |
| 5 | John Kevin Coleman | Ballinhassig | 2-01 | 7 | Éire Óg |
| 5 | Derry Coleman | Ballinhassig | 1-04 | 7 | Mayfield |
| 5 | Noel Crowley | Bandon | 0-07 | 7 | Mayfield |
| 8 | Mick Malone | Éire Óg | 2-00 | 6 | Ballinhassig |
| 8 | John Kevin Coleman | Ballinhassig | 2-00 | 6 | Éire Óg |
| 8 | Jerry Murphy | Ballinhassig | 2-00 | 6 | Mayfield |
| 8 | Derry Coleman | Ballinhassig | 1-03 | 6 | Éire Óg |
| 8 | Derry Coleman | Ballinhassig | 1-03 | 6 | Mayfield |
| 8 | Derry Coleman | Ballinhassig | 1-03 | 6 | Bandon |
| 8 | Tim McAuliffe | Mayfield | 0-06 | 6 | Ballinhassig |

=== Miscellaneous ===
- A fire at the Bandon clubhouse on the previous day resulted in the team wearing the Carbery colours for their quarter-final meeting with Meelin.
