= 1975 Cork Junior Football Championship =

- Dates: 5 October – 30 November 1975
- Teams: 8
- Champions: Bandon (4th title); Robert Wilmot (captain)
- Runners-up: Carrignavar; Bernard Lynch (captain)

Tournament statistics
- Matches played: 6
- Goals scored: 25 (4.17 per match)
- Points scored: 108 (18 per match)

The 1975 Cork Junior Football Championship was the 77th staging of the Cork Junior Football Championship since its establishment by Cork County Board in 1895. The championship ran from 5 October to 30 November 1975.

The final was played on 30 November 1975 at Coachford Sportsfield, between Bandon and Carrignavar, in what was their first ever meeting in the final. Bandon won the match by 1–11 to 1–01 to claim their fourth championship title overall and a first title in 22 years.

== Results ==
=== Quarter-finals ===
5 October 1975 Quarter-final	Mayfield	1–14 – 0–05	Mitchelstown	Clonmult Memorial Park
	B Murphy 0–5, E McCarthy 1–1, S O'Connell 0–4, T McAuliffe 0–2, S Long 0–1, J Nodwell 0–1.		J McCarthy 0–2, M Mullins 0–1, T Nolan 0–1, M O'Mahony 0–1.

5 October 1975 Quarter-final	Ballydesmond	5–10 – 3–05	Shamrocks	Castle Ground
	C Kearney 1–6, W Walsh 2–0, A Connors 1–1, J Murphy 1–0, E Kelly 0–2, MJ Kearney 0–1.		G Hanley 2–2, N Spillane 1–2, A Ronayne 0–1.

12 October 1975 Quarter-final	Bandon	2–11 – 2–06	Castletownbere	Rossa Park
	J O'Mahony 1–4, R Wilmot 1–1, E Philpott 0–3, C Daly 0–3.		S O'Sullivan 1–2, F McCarthy 1–0, M Hanley 0–2, T Fitzgerald 0–2.	Referee: M Brosnan (Caheragh)

19 October 1975 Quarter-final	Carrignavar	2–08 – 2–06	Our Lady's Hospital	Ballinlough Grounds
	W Scanlon 1–0, B Lynch 0–3, D Burke 0–2, N Miller 0–1, J O'Keeffe 0–1, D O'Keeffe 0–1.		C Murphy 1–4, D Healy 1–1, F Cooper 0–1.	Referee: E Porter (Brian Dillons)

=== Semi-finals ===
2 November 1975 Semi-final	Bandon	2–05 – 0–09	Ballydesmond	Castle Grounds
	C Daly 1–1, D Crowley 1–0, J O'Mahony 0–2, B Desmond 0–1, J Fitzgerald 0–1.		C Kearney 0–5, MJ Kearney 0–2, A O'Connor 0–1, J Murphy 0–1.

2 November 1975 Semi-final	Carrignavar	3–10 – 1–07	Mayfield	Riverstown Sportsfield
	T Gallagher 1–4, D Burke 1–2, J O'Keeffe 1–0, T Newman 0–1, J Crowley 0–1, B Lynch 0–1, D O'Keeffe 0–1.		V Twomey 1–0, B Murphy 0–3, P Murphy 0–1, E McCarthy 0–1, J Atkins 0–1, S Lucey 0–1.

=== Final ===
30 November 1975 Final	Bandon	1–11 – 1–01	Carrignavar	Coachford Sportsfield
	J O'Mahony 1–4, B Desmond 0–2, J Gabriel 0–1, E Philpott 0–1, J Fitzgerald 0–1, R Wilmot 0–1, G Long 0–1.		J O'Keeffe 1–0, D O'Keeffe 0–1.	Referee: P Finnegan
