= Robert Wilmot (Gaelic footballer) =

Irish hurler and Gaelic footballer

Personal information
- Native name: Roibeárd Uilmit (Irish)
- Born: 1954 (age 71–72) Bandon, County Cork, Ireland
- Height: 6 ft 1 in (185 cm)

Sport
- Sport: Gaelic football
- Position: Left wing-back
Clubs
- Years: Club
- Bandon → Carbery
Club titles
- Cork titles: 0
Inter-county
Years	County	Apps (scores)
1972-1974	Cork	1 (0-00)
Inter-county titles
- Munster titles: 2
- All-Irelands: 1
- NFL: 0
- All Stars: 0

Robert P. Wilmot (born 1954) is an Irish retired hurler and Gaelic footballer who played for Cork Championship club Bandon and at inter5-county level with the Cork senior football team. He usually lined out at wing-back or midfield.

== Career ==
Wilmot first came to prominence as a dual player with the Bandon club. At St. Brogan's the Bandon underage section he came close to success but lost county minor hurling finals in 1969 and 1972.Then at Under-21 club level Bandon got to two county under-21 finals in 1973 (Football) and 1975 (Hurling) and winning five consecutive West Cork MHC titles before later winning Cork JFC (as captain) and Cork IHC titles. Wilmot first appeared on the inter-county scene as a dual player with the respective Cork minor teams. He lined out in three minor finals across both codes in the space of a year, winning the All-Ireland MFC title in 1972, before later winning a Munster U21FC. Wilmot joined the Cork senior football team during the 1972-73 National League and was an unused substitute when Cork beat Galway to win the 1973 All-Ireland Championship. He also secured two Munster Championship medals during his brief inter-county career.

== Honours ==
Bandon

- Cork Intermediate Hurling Championship: 1974
- Cork Junior Football Championship: 1975 (c)

Cork

- All-Ireland Senior Football Championship: 1973
- Munster Senior Football Championship: 1973, 1974
- Munster Under-21 Football Championship: 1974
- All-Ireland Minor Football Championship: 1971
- Munster Minor Football Championship: 1971, 1972
- Munster Minor Hurling Championship: 1971
