= Pat Kavanagh (Cork hurler) =

Irish Gaelic football player and hurler

Personal information
- Native name: Pádraig Caaomhánach (Irish)
- Born: 1952 (age 73–74) Blackrock, Cork, Ireland
- Occupation: Plasterer

Sport
- Sport: Gaelic football
- Position: Right wing-forward
Clubs
- Years: Club
- Blackrock; St. Michael's
Club titles
	Football	Hurling
Cork titles	0	6
Munster titles	0	5
All-Ireland titles	0	3
Inter-county
Years	County	Apps (scores)
1978-1979	Cork	2 (0-03)
Inter-county titles
- Munster titles: 0
- All-Irelands: 0
- NFL: 0
- All Stars: 0

Patrick Kavanagh (born 1952) is an Irish former Gaelic footballer and hurler. At club level he played with Blackrock and St. Michael's and was also a member of the Cork senior football team.

== Career ==
Kavanagh first played hurling at juvenile and underage levels with Blackrock. He was part of the club's minor team that won three successive Cork MHC titles from 1967 to 1969. Kavanagh subsequently joined the Blackrock senior team and was part of three All-Ireland SCHC-winning teams. His performances at underage club level earned a call-up to the Cork minor hurling team and, after losing the 1968 All-Ireland minor final to Wexford, went on to secure consecutive All-Ireland MHC titles in 1969 and as team captain in 1970.

Kavanagh was drafted onto the Cork under-21 team while still a member of the minor side and he won three All-Ireland U21HC titles in four seasons from 1970 to 1973. He never earned selection with the Cork senior hurling team. Kavanagh was part of the St. Michael's senior team that lost three successive Cork SFC finals from 1976 to 1978. He lined out with the Cork senior football team during the 1979 Munster SFC.

== Honours ==
Blackrock

- All-Ireland Senior Club Hurling Championship: 1972, 1974, 1979
- Munster Senior Club Hurling Championship: 1971, 1973, 1975, 1978, 1979
- Cork Senior Hurling Championship: 1971, 1973, 1975, 1978, 1979, 1985
- Cork Minor Hurling Championship: 1967, 1968, 1969

Cork

- All-Ireland Under-21 Hurling Championship: 1970, 1971, 1973
- Munster Under-21 Hurling Championship: 1970, 1971, 1973
- All-Ireland Minor Hurling Championship: 1969, 1970 (c)
- Munster Minor Hurling Championship: 1968, 1969, 1970 (c)

Sporting positions
Preceded by Seán Collins	Cork minor hurling team captain 1970	Succeeded by Séamus Coughlan
Achievements
Preceded by Tom Byrne	All-Ireland Minor Hurling Final winning captain 1970	Succeeded by John Buckley
