= 1929 Cork Junior Hurling Championship =

Irish hurling competition

- Dates: 6 October 1929 – 2 March 1930
- Teams: 6
- Champions: Bandon (1st title); H. O'Leary (captain)
- Runners-up: Ballinora; J. Horgan (captain)

Tournament statistics
- Matches played: 5
- Goals scored: 33 (6.6 per match)
- Points scored: 18 (3.6 per match)

The 1929 Cork Junior Hurling Championship was the 33rd staging of the Cork Junior Hurling Championship since its establishment by the Cork County Board in 1895. The championship ran from 6 October 1929 to 2 March 1930.

The final was played on 2 March 1930 at the Athletic Grounds in Ballinhassig, between Bandon and Ballinora, in what was their first and only meeting in the final. Bandon won the match by 2-05 to 2-01 to claim their third championship title in succession.

== Qualification ==
Division	Championship	Champions	#
Avondhu	North Cork Junior Hurling Championship	Churchtown	
Carbery	South West Junior Hurling Championship	Bandon	
Carrigdhoun	South East Junior Hurling Championship	Tracton	
Imokilly	East Cork Junior Hurling Championship	Midleton	
Muskerry	Mid Cork Junior Hurling Championship	Ballinora	
Seandún	Cork City Junior Hurling Championship	Glen Rovers	

== Results ==
=== Quarter-finals ===
6 October 1929 Quarter-final	Ballinora	4-02 - 3-01	Tracton	The Mardyke

10 November 1929 Quarter-final	Glen Rovers	6-02 - 3-01	Churchtown	Mallow Town Park

=== Semi-finals ===
19 January 1930 Semi-final	Bandon	6-01 - 4-01	Midleton	Bandon Athletic Grounds

16 February 1930 Semi-final	Ballinora	3-02 - 0-02	Glen Rovers	Cork Athletic Grounds

=== Final ===
2 March 1930 Final	Bandon	2-05 - 2-01	Ballinora	Ballinhassig Athletic Grounds
