= 1972 Cork Junior Hurling Championship =

Irish hurling competition

- Dates: 22 October - 3 December 1972
- Teams: 7
- Champions: Newcestown (1st title); Seán Crowley (captain)
- Runners-up: Kildorrery; Pat Fenton (captain)

Tournament statistics
- Matches played: 6
- Goals scored: 34 (5.67 per match)
- Points scored: 81 (13.5 per match)
- Top scorer(s): Frank Kehilly (5-01)

The 1972 Cork Junior Hurling Championship was the 75th staging of the Cork Junior Hurling Championship since its establishment by the Cork County Board. The championship ran from 22 October to 3 December 1972.

The final was played on 3 December 1972 at the Athletic Grounds in Cork, between Newcestown and Kildorrery, in what was their first ever meeting in the final. Newcestown won the match by 2-07 to 2-04 to claim their first ever championship.

Newcestown's Frank Kehilly was the championship's top scorer with 5-01.

== Results ==
=== Quarter-finals ===
22 October 1972 Quarter-final	Newcestown	3-06 - 1-07	Dungourney	Riverstown Sportsfield
	F Kehilly 3-0, G O'Callaghan 0-3, T Crowley 0-1, D Kehilly 0-1, A O'Flynn 0-1.		Maurice Aherne 1-0, Michael Aherne 0-3, D Walsh 0-2, A Kelleher 0-1, M O'Mahony 0-1.	Referee: D Owens (St. Nicholas')

29 October 1972 Quarter-final	Éire Óg	5-07 - 4-05	Ballymartle	Ballinhassig
	J O'Leary 2-4, P O'Brien 2-0, C Malone 1-0, M Malone 0-2, D O'Brien 0-1.		F Coleman 2-1, G Coleman 1-2, F Cronin 1-0, L Webb 0-2.	Referee: Cronin (St. Finbarr's)

12 November 1972 Quarter-final	Meelin	3-10 - 1-06	St. Finbarr's	Coachford Sportsfield
	B Buckley 0-7, B Quinn 1-2, T Linehan 1-0, P O'Connor 1-0, P Buckley 0-1.		J O'Shea 1-2, T Butler 0-3, P McMahon 0-1.

=== Semi-finals ===
12 November 1972 Semi-final	Kildorrery	5-09 - 4-05	Éire Óg	Riverstown Sportsfield
	M Monaghan 3-0, M Curtin 1-2, D Bermingham 1-1, J Dunne 0-2, E O'Connor 0-2, S Bermingham 0-1.		T Brennan 1-1, C Malone 1-0, J O'Callaghan 1-0, P O'Brien 1-0, M Malone 0-2, J O'Leary 0-2.

19 November 1972 Semi-final	Newcestown	2-10 - 2-05	Meelin	Coachford Sportsfield
	T Crowley 1-6, K Calnan 1-0, K Kehilly 0-2, J O'Leary 0-1, A Flynn 0-1.		B Buckley 1-2, T Linehan 1-0, B Quinn 0-1, P Buckley 0-1, P O'Connor 0-1.	Referee: M Keane (Cloughduv)

=== Final ===
3 December 1972 Final	Newcestown	2-07 - 2-04	Kildorrery	Cork Athletic Grounds
	F Kehilly 2-1, T Crowley 0-3, T Flynn 0-1, J O'Callaghan 0-1, J O'Leary 0-1.		E O'Connor 1-2, D Bermingham 1-1, P Fenton 0-1.	Referee: P Cronin (St. Finbarr's)

== Championship statistics ==
=== Top scorers ===
Overall

Rank	Player	Club	Tally	Total	Matches	Average
1	Frank Kehilly	Newcestown	5-01	16	3	5.33
2	Tim Crowley	Newcestown	1-10	13	3	4.33
3	Jamesie O'Leary	Éire Óg	2-06	12	2	6.00
3	Brendan Buckley	Meelin	1-09	12	2	6.00
5	Mick Monaghan	Kildorrery	3-00	9	2	4.50
5	Paddy O'Brien	Éire Óg	3-00	9	2	4.50

In a single game

Rank	Player	Club	Tally	Total	Opposition
1	Jamesie O'Leary	Éire Óg	2-04	10	Ballymartle
2	Frank Kehilly	Newcestown	3-00	9	Dungourney
2	Mick Monaghan	Kildorrery	3-00	9	Éire Óg
2	Tim Crowley	Newcestown	1-06	9	Meelin
5	Finbarr Coleman	Ballymartle	2-01	7	Éire Óg
5	Frank Kehilly	Newcestown	2-01	7	Kildorrery
5	Brendan Buckley	Meelin	0-07	7	St. Finbarr's
8	Paddy O'Brien	Éire Óg	2-00	6	Ballymartle
