= 1974 Cork Intermediate Hurling Championship =

Irish hurling competition

- Dates: 5 May - 29 September 1974
- Teams: 13
- Champions: Bandon (2nd title); Frank Long (captain)
- Runners-up: Midleton

Tournament statistics
- Matches played: 14
- Goals scored: 56 (4 per match)
- Points scored: 234 (16.71 per match)
- Top scorer(s): Noel Crowley (2-25)

The 1974 Cork Intermediate Hurling Championship was the 65th staging of the Cork Intermediate Hurling Championship since its establishment by the Cork County Board in 1909. The draw for the opening round fixtures took place at the Cork Convention on 27 January 1974. The championship ran from 5 May to 29 September 1974.

On 29 September 1974, Bandon won the championship following a 2-07 to 1-06 defeat of Midleton in the final. This was their second championship title overall and their first title since 1952.

Bandon's Noel Crowley was the championship's top scorer with 2-25.

== Results ==
=== First round ===
5 May 1974 First round	Brian Dillons	0-02 - 3-18	Ballincollig	Cork Athletic Grounds
	D Scanlon 0-1, J Goode 0-1.		B Fitton 2-4, P Murphy 0-7, J Hegarty 1-2, T Radley 0-3, N Collins 0-2.

12 May 1974 First round	Castletownroche	2-01 - 2-10	Blackrock	Coachford Sportsfield
	D Relihan 1-1, R Browne 1-0.		N O'Keeffe 0-5, G Buckley 1-0, N Kirby 1-0, B Cummins 0-2, A Fahy 0-1, W Cronin 0-1, P Kavanagh 0-1.

12 May 1974 First round	Ballinhassig	4-15 - 1-01	St. Finbarr's	Minane Bridge Grounds

19 May 1974 First round	Newcestown	2-11 - 2-11	Bandon	St. Mary's
	T Crowley 0-9, A O'Flynn 1-0, F Kehilly 1-0, G O'Leary 0-2.		N Crowley 0-6, S O'Donovan 1-2, J Wilmot 1-0, J Gabriel 0-2, F Crowley 0-1.

26 May 1974 First round	Cobh	1-08 - 4-10	Newtownshandrum	Castletownroche GAA Grounds
	M McGee 0-5, T Meaney 1-1, T McGee 0-1, P Meade 0-1.		D Coughlan 3-2, M Murphy 1-2, D Fehin 0-3, J Buckley 0-2, C Morrissey 0-1.

16 June 1974 First round replay	Newcestown	1-07 - 3-09	Bandon	St. Mary's
	T Crowley 1-2, S Crowley 0-2, K Kehilly 0-2, M Kehilly 0-1.		N Crowley 1-3, G Long 1-2, S O'Donovan 1-0, J Gabriel 0-1, P O'Riordan 0-1, D McCarthy 0-1, F Crowley 0-1.

=== Quarter-finals ===
2 June 1974 Quarter-final	Midleton	3-11 - 0-07	Glen Rovers	Carrigtwohill GAA Grounds
	W Glavin 0-8, J Hurley 1-1, B Keane 1-0, J O'Brien 1-0, S O'Farrell 0-2.		P Horgan 0-3, D McCarthy 0-2, M Corbett 0-1, P O'Connor 0-1.

9 June 1974 Quarter-final	Ballinhassig	5-15 - 3-04	Carrigtwohill	Cork Athletic Grounds
	JL O'Sullivan 1-5, B Coleman 0-6, TF Hayes 1-2, B Crowley 1-0, D Coleman 1-0, JK Coleman 0-1, D Finn 0-1.		M Sheehan 1-3, B Kidney 1-0, P Duggan 1-0, D Keane 0-1.

9 June 1974 Quarter-final	Newtownshandrum	1-10 - 1-06	Ballincollig	Páirc Mac Gearailt
	J Buckley 1-2, M Murphy 0-4, S Morrissey 0-3, D Coughlan 0-1.		B Fitton 1-1, N Collins 0-3, P Murphy 0-1, J Sheehy 0-1.

30 June 1974 Quarter-final	Bandon	4-09 - 1-07	Blackrock	Cloughduv GAA Grounds
	P Riordan 2-1, N Crowley 0-5, D McCarthy 1-0, S O'Donovan 1-0, J Gabriel 0-2, R Wilmot 0-1.		G Buckley 1-0, W Flynn 0-2, E Kirby 0-2, T Murphy 0-1, J Brohan 0-1, S Kearney 0-1.	Referee: M Keane (Cloughduv}

=== Semi-finals ===
30 June 1974 Semi-final	Midleton	2-09 - 1-08	Ballinhassig	Cork Athletic Grounds
	T O'Mahony 1-0, J O'Brien 1-0, J Fenton 0-3, W Glavin 0-3, S O'Farrel 0-2, B Keane 0-1.		B Coleman 0-5, W Walsh 1-0, D Coleman 0-1, JK Coleman 0-1, F Roche 0-1.	Referee: W Horgan (Brian Dillons)

21 July 1974 Semi-final	Bandon	1-13 - 3-07	Newtownshandrum	Páitc Mac Gearailt
	S O'Donovan 1-1, R Wilmot 0-4, N Crowley 0-3, J Gabriel 0-2, P Crowley 0-2, D McCarthy 0-1.		M Murphy 1-2, D Coughlan 1-1, S Morrissey 1-0, D Fehin 0-2, P Herlihy 0-1, J Buckley 0-1.

8 September 1974 Semi-final replay	Bandon	3-04 - 0-08	Newtownshandrum	Páitc Mac Gearailt
	F Crowley 1-0, G Gabriel 1-0, D McCarthy 1-0, N Crowley 0-3, G Long 0-1.		D Morrissey 0-2, M Murphy 0-2, M Murphy 0-1, P Herlihy 0-1, C Morrissey 0-1, D Coughlan 0-1.	Referee: F Murphy (Blackrock}

=== Final ===
29 September 1974 Final	Bandon	2-07 - 1-06	Midleton	Ballinlough Sportsfield
	N Crowley 1-5, G Gabriel 1-0, J Gabriel 0-2.		W Glavin 1-1, B Keane 0-2, J Fenton 0-2, P Fitzgerald 0-1.
