= 1932 Cork Intermediate Football Championship =

Gaelic football competition

- Champions: Fermoy (2nd title); E Hallinan (captain)
- Runners-up: Kilmurry; M Murphy (captain)

The 1932 Cork Intermediate Football Championship was the 23rd staging of the Cork Intermediate Football Championship since its establishment by the Cork County Board in 1909.

The final was played on 18 September 1932 at the Mardyke in Cork, between Fermoy and Kilmurry, in what was their first ever meeting in the final. Fermoy won the match by 2–04 to 0–01 to claim their second championship title overall and a first championship title in 17 years.

== Results ==
=== Final ===
18 September 1932 Final	Fermoy	2-04 - 0-01	Bantry Blues	The Mardyke
