= 2016 Cork Premier Intermediate Hurling Championship =

- Dates: 21 May 2016 – 9 October 2016
- Teams: 16
- Sponsor: Evening Echo
- Champions: Bandon (1st title); Darren Crowley (captain); Niall O’Halloran (manager)
- Runners-up: Fermoy; Eoin Clancy (captain); Denis Ring (manager)

Tournament statistics
- Matches played: 30
- Goals scored: 71 (2.37 per match)
- Points scored: 935 (31.17 per match)
- Top scorer(s): Liam Coleman (3-51)

The 2016 Cork Premier Intermediate Hurling Championship was the 13th staging of the Cork Premier Intermediate Hurling Championship since its establishment by the Cork County Board in 2004. The draw for the opening round of the championship took place at the County Convention on 13 December 2015. The championship began on 21 May 2016 and ended on 9 October 2016.

On 9 October 2016, Bandon won the championship following a 1-20 to 1-14 defeat of Fermoy in the final. This remains their only championship title in the grade.

Fermoy's Liam Coleman was the championship's top scorer with 3-51.

== Format change ==
The 2016 championship saw the introduction of a new double-elimination format. Each team would now be guaranteed at least two games before exiting the championship.

== Teams ==
A total of 16 teams contested the Premier Intermediate Championship, including 15 teams from the 2015 premier intermediate championship and one promoted from the 2015 intermediate championship.

== Team changes ==
=== To Championship ===
Promoted from the Cork Intermediate Hurling Championship

- Charleville

=== From Championship ===
Promoted to the Cork Senior Hurling Championship

- Newcestown

== Results ==
=== Round 1 ===
21 May 2016 Round 1	Charleville	1-13 – 2-17 (aet)	Bandon	Coachford
	M Kavanagh 0-8, A Cagney 1-2, D Fitzgibbon 0-2, J Doyle 0-1.		D Crowley 0-10, R Crowley 1-2, M Sugrue 1-1, A Murphy 0-2, D Lucey 0-1, J Hickey 0-1.	Referee: B Murphy (Carrigtwohill)

28 May 2016 Round 1	Castlelyons	1-11 – 4-11	Inniscarra	Páirc Uí Rinn, Cork
	M Spillane 1-3, A O'Sullivan 0-4, D Lawlor 0-2, R Fenton 0-1, K O'Leary 0-1.		D O'Connell 3-1, C Casey 1-3, T O'Connor 0-3, A O'Mahony 0-2, K Rice 0-1, S Olden 0-1.	Referee: T O'Donovan (Douglas)

28 May 2016 Round 1	Tracton	0-18 – 3-23	Ballinhassig	Carrigaline
	R Walsh 0-8, D O'Callaghan 0-3, S O'Sullivan 0-3, G Kingston 0-2, D Griffin 0-1, K Lynch 0-1.		F O'Leary 1-10, D O'Callaghan 1-4, P Collins 1-4, M Desmond 0-2, M Aherne 0-1, C Reynolds 0-1, S McCarthy 0-1.	Referee: J Larkin (Douglas)

28 May 2016 Round 1	Fermoy	3-16 – 4-11	Kilworth	Kildorrery
	L Coleman 1-9, J Hutchings 1-3, T Clancy 1-0, P de Róiste 0-2, E Clancy 0-1, K Morrison 0-1.		N McNamara 3-5, J McCarthy 1-1, A Mannix 0-2, B Sheehan 0-1, C Donnellan 0-1, J Saich 0-1.	Referee: C Lane (Banteer)

28 May 2016 Round 1	Kanturk	0-13 – 1-15	Cloyne	Páirc Uí Rinn, Cork
	L McLoughlin 0-5, L O'Keeffe 0-4, I Walsh 0-2, L O'Neill 0-1, J Fitzpatrick 0-1.		P O'Sullivan 1-4, D Cahill 0-4, I Cahill 0-2, C O'Sullivan 0-2, D O'Sullivan 0-2, M Lynch 0-1.	Referee: N Wall (Carrigaline)

29 May 2016 Round 1	Carrigaline	1-16 – 1-11	Mallow	Páirc Uí Rinn, Cork
	K McIntyre 1-2, R O'Shea 0-5, S O'Brien 0-4, W O'Brien 0-2, D Drake 0-1, S Corcoran 0-1, T Murphy 0-1.		D Hayes 1-0, P Lyons 0-3, P Herlihy 0-3, S Hayes 0-3, D Hayes 0-1, J O'Hanlon 0-1.	Referee: M Maher (St. Finbarr's)

29 May 2016 Round 1	Valley Rovers	1-16 – 1-12	Courcey Rovers	Riverstick
	C O'Leary 1-7, K Canty 0-4, J Walsh 0-3, J Cottrell 0-1, D Looney 0-1.		S Nyhan 1-2, D Lordan 0-5, G Moloney 0-3, C Daly 0-1, T Collins 0-1.	Referee: D Copps (Ballyhea)

29 May 2016 Round 1	Watergrasshill	1-15 – 0-14	Blarney	Riverstown
	S O'Regan 0-6, J Halbert 0-4, W Connolly 1-0, B Halbert 0-3, P Cronin 0-2.		B O'Connell 0-5, M Coleman 0-3, K Costello 0-2, L Sheehan 0-2, D Dunlea 0-1, B Hurley 0-1.	Referee: D Crowley (Argideen Rangers)

=== Round 2A ===
18 June 2016 Round 2A	Watergrasshill	0-16 – 2-15	Bandon	Ballinlough
	S O'Regan 0-12, A Cronin 0-1, E Barry 0-1, K O'Neill 0-1, D McCarthy 0-1.		R Crowley 1-4, A Murphy 1-2, D Crowley 0-3, M Sugrue 0-3, J Hickey 0-3.	Referee: D Farrell (Mitchelstown)

18 June 2016 Round 2A	Cloyne	2-16 – 1-15	Fermoy	Páirc Uí Rinn, Cork
	D Cahill 0-7, I Cahill 2-0, P O'Sullivan 0-5, A Walsh 0-3, S Beausang 0-1.		L Coleman 1-9, P Roche 0-2, K Morrison 0-2, E Clancy 0-1, D Geary 0-1.	Referee: N Wall (Carrigaline)

24 June 2016 Round 2A	Ballinhassig	0-15 – 1-17	Carrigaline	Liam MacCarthy Park, B'garvan
	F O'Leary 0-7, D O'Callaghan 0-2, M Aherne 0-1, P Collins 0-1, C Tyers 0-1, S McCarthy 0-1, B Coleman 0-1.		R O'Shea 0-10, T Murphy 1-2, K McIntyre 0-2, W O'Brien 0-2, S O'Brien 0-1.	Referee: S Crowley (Argideen Rangers)

24 July 2016 Round 2A	Inniscarra	2-14 – 0-17	Valley Rovers	Cloughduv
	C Casey 2-4, A O'Mahony 0-8, K Rice 0-2.		C O'Leary 0-8, J Walsh 0-3, D Looney 0-2, K Canty 0-2, J Cottrell 0-1, B Crolwey 0-1.	Referee: M Maher (St. Finbarr's)

=== Round 2B ===
18 June 2016 Round 2B	Castlelyons	1-17 – 1-13	Courcey Rovers	Blarney
	R Fenton 0-6, A Spillane 0-5, R Bransfield 1-0, J Barry 0-2, R Feeney 0-2, A O'Sullivan 0-1, K O'Leary 0-1.		D Lordan 0-6, S Moloney 1-0, D O'Neill 0-2, G Moloney 0-2, T Collins 0-1, G Minihane 0-1.	Referee: S Stokes (Tullylease)

19 June 2016 Round 2B	Blarney	0-14 – 1-23	Charleville	Páirc Uí Rinn, Cork
	B O'Connell 0-6, D Cremin 0-4, C Murphy 0-2, D Dunlea 0-1, M Coleman 0-1.		D Fitzgibbon 1-7, J O'Brien 0-5, A Cagney 0-3, D O'Flynn 0-2, J Barry 0-2, M Kavanagh 0-2, D Kelleher 0-1, D Casey 0-1.	Referee: C McAllister (Agahda)

24 June 2016 Round 2B	Kilworth	1-16 – 0-16	Kanturk	Gaels Memorial Park, Ballyhea
	N McNamara 0-6, L Whelan 0-3, A Condon 0-2, N O'Brien 0-1, P Moakley 0-1, K Walsh 0-1, B Sheehan 0-1, J Saich 0-1.

16 July 2016 Round 2B	Mallow	5-22 – 0-16	Tracton	Cloughduv
	S Hayes 2-7, A Sheehan 1-3, C Murphy 0-6, P Herlihy 1-1, D Relihan 1-0, D Hayes 0-2, G Hayes 0-1, A Luttrell 0-1, P Lyons 0-1.		R Walsh 0-10, D Griffin 0-1, G Kingston 0-1, J Good 0-1, T McGuinness 0-1, K Healy 0-1, D Flaherty 0-1.	Referee: S Crowley (Argideen Rangers)

=== Round 3 ===
31 July 2016 Round 3	Ballinhassig	0-24 – 0-16	Castlelyons	Páirc Uí Rinn, Cork
	F O'Leary 0-10, C Reynolds 0-4, C O'Mahony 0-3, S McCarthy 0-2, P Collins 0-2, M Coleman 0-1, D O'Callaghan 0-1, C Tyers 0-1.		A Spillane 0-8, J Barry 0-3, A O'Sullivan 0-2, M Spillane 0-2, T Carroll 0-1.	Referee: S Stokes (Tullylease)

31 July 2016 Round 3	Valley Rovers	0-16 – 1-14	Kilworth	Páirc Uí Rinn, Cork
	C O'Leary 0-8, D Lordan 0-2, J Cottrell 0-2, G Farrell 0-1, G Looney 0-1, K Canty 0-1, E O'Reilly 0-1.		P Lynch 1-1, N McNamara 0-4, P Moakley 0-2, F Walsh 0-2, C Donnellan 0-2, N O'Brien 0-1, J McCarthy 0-1, G Farrell 0-1.	Referee: G Scully (Killeagh)

6 August 2016 Round 3	Mallow	6-17 – 2-15	Watergrasshill	Castletownroche
	C Murphy 2-2, A Sheehan 1-1, S Hayes 1-1, G Hayes 0-4, B Murphy 1-0, D Hayes 1-0, P Lyons 0-3, A Luttrell 0-2, K Sheehan 0-2, P Herlihy 0-2.		S O'Regan 1-7, J McCarthy 1-0, J Halbert 0-2, K Coakley 0-2, D O'Farrell 0-2, P O'Regan 0-1, W Connolly 0-1.	Referee: C Lane (Banteer)

13 August 2016 Round 3	Charleville	0-12 – 2-14	Fermoy	Fr. Con Buckley Park, Buttevant
	D Fitzgibbon 0-6, A Cagney 0-2, M Kavanagh 0-2, J Barry 0-1, J O'Brien 0-1.		D Geary 0-7, M Brennan 1-1, P Roche 1-0, L Coleman 0-2, P Murphy 0-1, K Morrison 0-1, S Aherne 0-1, S Shanahan 0-1.	Referee: D Kirwan (Éire Óg)

=== Relegation play-offs ===
26 August 2016 Play-off	Kanturk	0-21 – 1-15	Tracton	Mourne Abbey
	L McLoughlin 0-7, D Kenneally 0-3, A Walsh 0-2, I Walsh 0-2, L O'Keeffe 0-2, P Walsh 0-1, L O'Neill 0-1, J Fitzpatrick 0-1, J Browne 0-1, D O'Donoghue 0-1.		R Walsh 0-11, D O'Callaghan 1-1, S O'Sullivan 0-1, D Flaherty 0-1, T McGuinness 0-1.	Referee: M Murphy (Bride Rovers)

24 September 2016 Play-off	Blarney	1-16 – 2-18	Courcey Rovers	Brinny
	M Coleman 1-10, R Murphy 0-2, J Jordan 0-2, S Lohan 0-1, JD Good 0-1.		D Lordan 0-7, G Minihane 1-2, B Collins 1-0, S Lordan 0-2, F Lordan 0-2, G Moloney 0-2, J O'Neill 0-2, T Collins 0-1.	Referee: M Maher (St. Finbarr's)

=== Quarter-finals ===
13 August 2016 Quarter-final	Bandon	2-17 – 1-18	Kilworth	Páirc Uí Rinn, Cork
	R Crowley 0-10, D Crowley 1-1, A Murphy 1-1, M Sugrue 0-2, E O'Donovan 0-2, J Hickey 0-1.		N McNamara 0-8, N O'Brien 1-1, J Saich 0-3, E McGrath 0-2, W Conlon 0-1, C Donnellan 0-1, K Walsh 0-1.	Referee: N Wall (Carrigaline)

13 August 2016 Quarter-final	Ballinhassig	1-14 – 1-17	Cloyne	Páirc Uí Rinn, Cork
	D O'Callaghan 1-3, F O'Leary 0-5, M Coleman 0-1, S McCarthy 0-1, D O'Donovan 0-1, C Reynolds 0-1, B Coleman 0-1, D Dineen 0-1.		D Cahill 0-9, C O'Sullivan 1-0, Paudie O'Sullivan 0-3, A Walsh 0-2, D O'Sullivan 0-1, Paul O'Sullivan 0-1, I Cahill 0-1.	Referee: M Maher (St. Finbarr's)

14 August 2016 Quarter-final	Carrigaline	0-21 – 2-21	Mallow	Páirc Uí Rinn, Cork
	R O'Shea 0-11, D Drake 0-4, S O'Brien 0-2, W O'Brien 0-1, K McIntyre 0-1, T Murphy 0-1, S Corcoran 0-1.		C Murphy 0-7, P Herlihy 1-3, S Hayes 0-5, D Hayes 1-0, A Sheehan 0-2, P Lyons 0-2, A Luttrell 0-1, B Murphy 0-1.	Referee: S Stokes (Tullylease)

19 August 2016 Quarter-final	Fermoy	0-16 – 0-13	Inniscarra	Páirc Uí Rinn, Cork
	L Coleman 0-8, M Brennan 0-3, D Geary 0-2, P de Róiste 0-2, S Aherne 0-1.		A O'Mahony 0-5, C Buckley 0-3, K Rice 0-1, C Casey 0-1, P Farmer 0-1, D O'Connell 0-1, D O'Keeffe 0-1.	Referee: G Scully (Killeagh)

=== Semi-finals ===
24 September 2016 Semi-final	Bandon	2-12 – 2-11	Mallow	Páirc Uí Rinn, Cork
	R Crowley 0-9 (5f, 1'65), M Sugrue 1-1, J Hickey; C O'Mahony 1-0, E O'Donovan 0-1, D Crowley 0-1.	Report	S Hayes 0-7 (6f, 1'65'), A Sheehan 1-1, D Hayes 1-0, P Herlihy 0-2, C Murphy 0-1.	Referee: C McAllister (Aghada)

24 September 2016 Semi-final	Cloyne	0-11 – 0-11	Fermoy	Páirc Uí Rinn, Cork
	D Cahill 0-9, D O'Sullivan 0-1, B Walsh 0-1.		L Coleman 0-6, D Geary 0-2, P Murphy 0-1, K Morrison 0-1, P de Róiste 0-1.	Referee: D Kirwan (Éire Óg)

30 September 2016 Semi-final replay	Cloyne	0-14 – 2-13	Fermoy	Páirc Uí Rinn, Cork
	D Cahill 0-8 (f), Paudie O'Sullivan 0-3, D O'Sullivan 0-2, I Cahill 0-1.	Report	L Coleman 1-9, (1-7f), S Aherne 1-1, J Hutchings, P De Roiste and D Geary 0-1 each.	Referee: N Wall (Carrigaline)

=== Final ===
9 October 2016 Final	Bandon	1-20 – 1-14	Fermoy	Páirc Uí Rinn, Cork
	R Crowley (1-10, 0-8 frees), M Sugrue and M Cahalane (0-3 each), E O’Donovan, D Crowley, A Murphy and R Fogarty (0-1 each).	Report	L Coleman (0-8 frees), P de Róiste (1-0), K Morrison, D Geary (0-1 free) and B O’Sullivan (0-2 each).	Referee: S Stokes (Tullylease)

== Championship statistics ==
=== Scoring events ===
- Widest winning margin: 21 points
  - Mallow 5-22 – 0-16 Tracton (Round 2B)
- Most goals in a match: 8
  - Mallow 6-17 – 2-15 Watergrasshill (Round 3)
- Most points in a match: 41
  - Ballinhassig 3-23 - 0-18 Tracton (Round 1)
- Most goals by one team in a match: 6
  - Mallow 6-17 – 2-15 Watergrasshill (Round 3)
- Most goals scored by a losing team: 4
  - Kilworth 4-11 - 3-16 Fermoy (Round 1)
- Most points scored by a losing team: 21
  - Carrigaline 0-21 – 2-21 Mallow (Quarter-final)

=== Top scorers ===
Top scorer overall

Rank	Player	Club	Tally	Total	Matches	Average
1	Liam Coleman	Fermoy	3-51	60	7	8.57
2	Ronan Crowley	Bandon	3-35	44	5	8.80
3	Dillon Cahill	Cloyne	0-37	37	5	7.20
4	Fintan O'Leary	Ballinhassig	1-32	35	4	8.75
5	Noel McNamara	Kilworth	3-23	32	4	8.00
5	Seán Hayes	Mallow	3-23	32	5	6.20
6	Ronan Walsh	Tracton	0-29	29	3	9.66
7	Shane O'Regan	Watergrasshill	1-25	28	3	9.33
8	Chris O'Leary	Valley Rovers	1-23	26	3	8.66
8	Rob O'Shea	Carrigaline	0-26	26	3	8.66

Top scorers in a single game

Rank	Player	Club	Tally	Total	Opposition
1	Noel McNamara	Kilworth	3-05	14	Fermoy
2	Seán Hayes	Mallow	2-07	13	Tracton
2	Fintan O'Leary	Ballinhassig	1-10	13	Tracton
2	Mark Coleman	Blarney	1-10	13	Courcey Rovers
2	Ronan Crowley	Bandon	1-10	13	Fermoy
3	Liam Coleman	Fermoy	1-09	12	Kilworth
3	Liam Coleman	Fermoy	1-09	12	Cloyne
3	Liam Coleman	Fermoy	1-09	12	Cloyne
3	Shane O'Regan	Watergrasshill	0-12	12	Bandon
4	Ronan Walsh	Tracton	0-11	11	Kanturk
4	Rob O'Shea	Carrigaline	0-11	11	Mallow

=== Miscellaneous ===
- Bandon completed a hurling-football double by also winning the Cork Intermediate Football Championship. It was also the first time that the club gained promotion to the Cork Senior Hurling Championship.
- Fermoy earned the unwanted distinction of completing a losing double when they also finished as runners-up in the Cork Premier Intermediate Football Championship. Losing both finals to Bandon.
- Ronan Crowley's tally of 1-10 remains a record individual score for a final.
