= 1929 Cork Junior Football Championship =

Irish Gaelic football competition

- Champions: Bandon (2nd title); A. O'Driscoll (captain)
- Runners-up: Iveleary; D. O'Leary (captain)

The 1929 Cork Junior Football Championship was the 31st staging of the Cork Junior Football Championship since its establishment by the Cork County Board in 1895.

The final was played on 13 April 1930 at the Dunmanway Grounds, between Bandon and Iveleary, in what was their first ever meeting in the final. Bandon won the match by 1–03 to 0–00 to claim their second championship title overall and a first title in four years.

== Results ==
=== Final ===
13 April 1930 Final	Bandon	1-03 - 0-00	Iveleary	Dunmanway Grounds
