= 1983 All-Ireland Junior Hurling Championship =

1983 inter-county junior hurling championship

All Ireland Champions
- Winners: Cork (9th win)
- Captain: Mossy Fitzgibbon

All Ireland Runners-up
- Runners-up: Galway
- Captain: Pete Finnerty

Provincial Champions
- Munster: Cork
- Leinster: Kilkenny
- Ulster: Cavan
- Connacht: Not Played

The 1983 All-Ireland Junior Hurling Championship was the 62nd staging of the All-Ireland Junior Championship since its establishment by the Gaelic Athletic Association in 1912.

Derry entered the championship as the defending champions.

The All-Ireland final was played on 25 September 1983 at the Gaelic Grounds in Limerick, between Cork and Galway, in what was their first meeting in the final since 1940. Cork won the match by 3-14 to 2-15 to claim their ninth championship title overall and a first title since 1958.

== Results ==
=== Leinster Junior Hurling Championship ===
==== Leinster semi-finals ====
25 June 1983 Semi-final	Wexford	6-11 - 0-02	Laois	Bellefield Road

25 June 1983 Semi-final	Louth	1-02 - 2-13	Kilkenny	Drogheda Park

==== Leinster final ====
8 July 1983 Final	Kilkenny	3-13 - 1-07	Weford	Dr. Cullen Park

=== Munster Junior Hurling Championship ===
==== Munster quarter-finals ====
2 June 1983 Quarter-final	Cork	2-25 - 3-13	Waterford	Clonmult Memorial Park

2 June 1983 Quarter-final	Clare	1-06 - 3-12	Limerick	Cusack Park

==== Munster semi-finals ====
15 June 1983 Semi-final	Cork	w/o - scr.	Kerry	Kilgarvan GAA Grounds

15 June 1983 Semi-final	Tipperary	1-13 - 2-06	Limerick	MacDonagh Park

==== Munster final ====
8 July 1983 Final	Tipperary	3-08 - 4-19	Cork	Leahy Park

=== Ulster Junior Hurling Championship ===
==== Ulster quarter-finals ====
20 May 1983 Quarter-final	Donegal	v	Derry	MacCumhaill Park

25 May 1983 Quarter-final	Fermanagh	3-10 - 2-04	Tyrone	Brewster Park

25 May 1983 Quarter-final	Monaghan	1-12 - 3-07	Cavan	Emmet Park

==== Ulster semi-finals ====
15 June 1983 Semi-final	Cavan	4-05 - 2-05	Down	Breffni Park

29 June 1983 Semi-final	Fermanagh	1-10 - 5-04	Donegal	Brewster Park

==== Ulster final ====
10 July 1983 Final	Cavan	2-11 - 2-06	Donegal	Pearse Park

=== All-Ireland Junior Hurling Championship ===
==== All-Ireland semi-finals ====
28 August 1983 Semi-final	Cavan	0-05 - 1-15	Galway	Hugh O'Reilly Park

28 August 1983 Semi-final	Cork	1-12 - 0-11	Kilkenny	Páirc Uí Chaoimh

==== All-Ireland final ====
25 September 1983 Final	Cork	3-14 - 2-15	Galway	Gaelic Grounds
