= 1949 Cork Junior Hurling Championship =

Irish hurling competition

- Teams: 7
- Champions: Bandon (2nd title)
- Runners-up: Kanturk

The 1949 Cork Junior Hurling Championship was the 52nd staging of the Cork Junior Hurling Championship since its establishment by the Cork County Board.

On 23 October 1949, Bandon won the championship following a 7-03 to 1-02 defeat of Kanturk in the final at the Cork Athletic Grounds. This was their second championship title overall and a first title in 20 years.

== Results ==
=== Final ===
23 October 1949 Final	Bandon	7-03 - 1-02	Kanturk	Cork Athletic Grounds
