= 1970 All-Ireland Minor Hurling Championship =

All-Ireland Minor Hurling Championship 1970
Championship Details
- Dates: 16 May – 6 September 1970
- Teams: 12

All Ireland Champions
- Winners: Cork (10th win)
- Captain: Pat Kavanagh

All Ireland Runners-up
- Runners-up: Galway
- Captain: Seán Hynes

Provincial Champions
- Munster: Cork
- Leinster: Wexford
- Ulster: Antrim
- Connacht: Not Played

Championship Statistics
- Matches Played: 11
- Total Goals: 67 (6.09 per game)
- Total Points: 183 (16.63 per game)
- Top Scorer: Seánie O'Leary (8-10)

The 1970 All-Ireland Minor Hurling Championship was the 40th staging of the All-Ireland Minor Hurling Championship since its establishment by the Gaelic Athletic Association in 1928. The championship ran from 16 May to 6 September 1970.

Cork entered the championship as the defending champions.

The All-Ireland final was played at Croke Park in Dublin on 6 September 1970 between Cork and Galway, in what was their third meeting in the All-Ireland final overall and a first meeting in 19 years. Cork won the match by 5-19 to 2-09 to claim their 10th All-Ireland title overall and a second title in succession.

Cork's Seánie O'Leary was the championship's top scorer with 8-10.

== Leinster Minor Hurling Championship ==
=== Leinster semi-finals ===
5 July 1970 Semi-final	Wexford	1-09 - 1-02	Dublin	Nowlan Park
	T O'Connor 1-4, K Kavanagh 0-1, J Murphy 0-1, D Grennan 0-1, B Murphy 0-1, J Breen 0-1.		P Lee 1-1, V Holden 0-1.

9 July 1970 Semi-final	Kilkenny	4-10 - 1-07	Offaly	O'Moore Park
	P Butler 0-5, P Bollard 1-1, J Giles 1-1, T Barry 1-0, J Houlihan 1-0, J Mullay 0-2, S McGarry 0-1.		P Dooley 1-4, C Spain 0-2, J McNally 0-1.

=== Leinster final ===
19 July 1970 Final	Wexford	3-10 - 1-10	Kilkenny	Dr. Cullen Park
	T O'Connor and D Grannell 1-1 each, T O'Brien 1-0, J Murphy, PJ Harris and B Murphy 0-2 each, P O'Neill and L Dunphy 0-1 each.		P Bollard 0-5, P Mullally 1-0, J Giles 0-3, R Dunne and P Butler 0-1 each.

== Munster Minor Hurling Championship ==
=== Munster first round ===
16 May 1970 First round	Limerick	0-05 - 3-05	Clare	Gaelic Grounds
	P Neville 0-2, F Ryan 0-1, J Ryan 0-1, L O'Donoghue 0-1.		M Gough 1-0, G Treacy 1-0, S O'Connell 1-0, M McKeogh 0-3, C Honan 0-1.

=== Munster semi-finals ===
28 June 1970 Semi-final	Cork	6-17 - 2-00	Clare	Thurles Sportsfield
	T Sheehan 1-5, T Crowley 1-3, D Relihan 1-4, J Hanley 1-2, S O'Leary 1-1, S O'Farrell 0-2.		M O'Connell 1-0, M Gough 1-0.

28 June 1970 Semi-final	Tipperary	9-11 - 7-04	Waterford	Páirc Mac Gearailt
	M Hogan 4-1, D Dwyer 3-1, W Condon 2-1, M Young 0-3, J Keogh 0-3, J Darcy 0-1, J Spooner 0-1.		D Ormonde 2-1, T Casey 2-0, T Reid 1-3, PJ Ryan 1-0, M O'Brien 1-0.	Referee: D O'Brien (Cork)

=== Munster final ===
19 July 1970 Final	Cork	3-08 - 4-04	Tipperary	Gaelic Grounds
	S O'Leary 3-2, G Sheehan 0-2, S Farrell, T Crowley, M Doherty and G Hanley 0-1 each.		N Maher, D O'Dwyer, C Keogh and J Darcy 1-0 each, W Conlon and T Young 0-2 each.

== Ulster Minor Hurling Championship ==
=== Ulster final ===
21 June 1970 Final	Antrim	4-12 - 0-05	Down	Casement Park
	S McGourty 2-1, P Grocott 1-3, J Smith 1-0, S O'Neill 0-2, P Muldoon 0-2, C McDonnell 0-2, K Donnelly 0-2.		C McGrattan 0-2, D Mullan 0-1, M Ward 0-1, T Atkinson 0-1.

== All-Ireland Minor Hurling Championship ==
=== All-Irland semi-finals ===
16 August 1970 Semi-final	Galway	3-09 - 2-04	Wexford	Páirc Chiaráin
	S Hynes 1-2, M Donohghue 0-4, J McDonagh 1-0, D Duffy 1-0, D Campbell 0-2, A Fintan 0-1.		M Bernie 1-1, B Dempsey 1-0, T O'Connor 0-2, P O'Neill 0-1.

16 August 1970 Semi-final	Cork	6-16 - 0-07	Antrim	Gaelic Grounds
	S O'Leary 2-5, T Sheehan 0-8, S O'Farrell 2-0, G Hanley 1-1, D Renihan 1-0, N Crowley 0-1, T Crowley 0-1.		J Crossley 0-3, K Donnelly 0-2, S O'Donnell 0-2.

=== All-Ireland final ===
6 September 1970 Final	Cork	5-19 - 2-09	Galway	Croke Park
	D Relihan 2-2, S O'Leary 2-2, T Sheehan 0-7, S O'Farrell 1-2, G Hanley 0-3, V Twomey 0-1, M O'Doherty 0-1, P Kavanagh 0-1.		M Donoghue 1-6, S Hynes 1-0, D Campbell 0-2, M Holland 0-1.

== Championship statistics ==
=== Top scorers ===
Overall

Rank	Player	Club	Tally	Total	Matches	Average
1	Seánie O'Leary	Cork	8-10	34	4	8.50
2	Tommy Sheehan	Cork	1-22	25	4	6.25
3	Dan Relihan	Cork	4-06	18	4	4.50
4	Séamus O'Farrell	Cork	3-05	14	4	3.50
5	Martin Hogan	Tipperary	4-01	13	2	6.50
5	Donal O'Dwyer	Tipperary	4-01	13	2	6.50
5	Ger Hanley	Cork	2-07	13	4	3.25
5	Tom O'Connor	Wexford	2-07	13	3	4.33
5	Michael Donoghue	Galway	1-10	13	2	6.50

In a single game

Rank	Player	Club	Tally	Total	Opposition
1	Martin Hogan	Tipperary	4-01	13	Waterford
2	Seánie O'Leary	Cork	3-02	11	Tipperary
2	Seánie O'Leary	Cork	2-05	11	Antrim
4	Donal O'Dwyer	Tipperary	3-01	10	Waterford
5	Michael Donoghue	Galway	1-06	9	Cork
6	Dan Relihan	Cork	2-02	8	Galway
6	Seánie O'Leary	Cork	2-02	8	Galway
6	Tommy Sheehan	Cork	1-05	8	Clare
6	Tommy Sheehan	Cork	0-08	8	Antrim
