= Darren Crowley =

Cork hurler (born 1987)

Personal information
- Born: 1987 (age 38–39) Bandon, County Cork

Sport
- Sport: Hurling
- Position: Half-forward
Club
- Years: Club
- 2000s–: Bandon
Inter-county
Years	County	Apps (scores)
2009–	Cork	0 (0–0)
Inter-county titles
- Munster titles: 0
- All-Irelands: 0

Darren Crowley (born 1987 in Bandon, County Cork) is an Irish sportsman. He plays hurling with his local club Bandon and has been a member of the Cork senior team since 2009, when he was called up due to the 2008-2009 Cork players strike.
