= 2016 Cork Intermediate Football Championship =

81st staging of the Cork Intermediate Football Championship

- Sponsor: Evening Echo
- Champions: Bandon (1st title); Pat Prendergast (captain); Colm Aherne (manager)
- Runners-up: Rockchapel; William Murphy (captain); Donal Casey (manager)

The 2016 Cork Intermediate Football Championship was the 81st staging of the Cork Intermediate Football Championship since its establishment by the Cork County Board in 1909.

The final was played on 16 October 2016 at Páirc Uí Rinn in Cork, between Bandon and Rockchapel, in what was their first ever meeting in the final. Bandon won the match by 1–10 to 1–07 to claim their first ever championship title.

== Results ==
=== Quarter-finals ===
4 September 2016 Quarter-final	Bandon	4-15 - 1-06	Mitchelstown	Erin's Own Grounds
	M Sugrue 4-9, E O'Donovan 0-2, D Lucey 0-2, A Murphy 0-1, M McNamara 0-1.		S Beston 1-0, M Walsh 0-3, S Cahill 0-1, S Walsh 0-1, J Sheehan 0-1.

9 September 2016 Quarter-final	Cill na Martra	1-11 - 0-10	Kanturk	Castle Grounds
	D Ó Duinnín 0-6, S Ó Duinnín 1-2, M Ó Deasúna 0-1, T Ó Corcora 0-1, M Ó Conchúir 0-1.		I Walsh 0-5, M Healy 0-3, A Walsh 0-1, J McLoughlin 0-1.

10 September 2016 Quarter-final	Rockchapel	2-12 - 0-12	Aghabullogue	KAnturk Grounds
	I Guiney 1-3, S Hickey 0-5, J O'Callaghan 1-0, B Cahill 0-2, D Curtin 0-1, M Stack 0-1.		M Bradley 0-6, J Corkery 0-3, S O'Sullivan 0-1, D Moynihan 0-1, E O'Sullivan 0-1.

17 September 2016 Quarter-final	Millstreet	0-15 - 0-13	St Finbarr's	Coachford Sportsfield
	K Crolwey 0-4, T Collins 0-4, M Ellis 0-2, A Murphy 0-1, B O'Flynn 0-1, C Crowley 0-1, D Buckley 0-1, B Sheehan 0-1.		R O'Mahony 0-4, C McCarthy 0-4, E Finn 0-2, B Ramsey 0-2, C Keane 0-1.

=== Semi-finals ===
1 October 2016 Semi-final	Bandon	2-13 - 2-08	Cill na Martra	Jack Fitzgerald Memorial Park
	M Sugrue 1-7, A Murphy 1-2, D Crowley 0-1, M Cahalane 0-1, M McNamara 0-1, J Walsh 0-1.	Report	D O'Connell 2-2, S Ó Duinnín 0-4, M Ó Duinnín 0-2.

2 October 2016 Semi-final	Rockchapel	1-12 - 1-04	Millstreet	Knocknagree Grounds
	L Collins 1-3, S Hickey 0-4, B Cahill 0-2, W Murphy 0-1, M Stack 0-1, D Curtin 0-1.		T Collins 1-1, C Crowley 0-2, K Crowley 0-1.

=== Final ===
16 October 2016 Final	Bandon	1-10 - 1-07	Rockchapel	Páirc Uí Rinn
	M Sugrue 0-6 (3 frees), A Murphy 1-0, B Collins 0-2, E O’Donovan 0-1 and R Crowley 0-1 each.	Report	D Curtin 0-3, B Cahill 1-0, S Hickey and L Collins (1 free) 0-2 each.
