= 1952 Cork Intermediate Hurling Championship =

Irish hurling competition

- Champions: Bandon (1st title); P. O'Neill (captain)
- Runners-up: Glen Rovers; D. Carroll (captain)

The 1952 Cork Intermediate Hurling Championship was the 43rd staging of the Cork Intermediate Hurling Championship since its establishment by the Cork County Board in 1909.

The final was played on 12 October 1952 at the Athletic Grounds in Kinsale, between Bandon and Glen Rovers, in what was their first ever meeting in the final. Bandon won the match by 1–05 to 1–02 to claim their first ever championship title.

== Results ==
=== Final ===
12 October 1952 Final	Bandon	1-05 - 1-02	Glen Rovers	Kinsale Athletic Grounds
