= 1950 All-Ireland Junior Hurling Championship =

1947 Irish championship

Championship Details
- Dates: 2 April - 15 October 1950

All Ireland Champions
- Winners: Cork (6th win)
- Captain: B. O'Neill

All Ireland Runners-up
- Runners-up: London
- Captain: W. Brophy

Provincial Champions
- Munster: Cork
- Leinster: Dublin
- Ulster: Antrim
- Connacht: Galway

The 1950 All-Ireland Junior Hurling Championship was the 29th staging of the All-Ireland Junior Championship since its establishment by the Gaelic Athletic Association in 1912. The championship began on 2 April 1950 and ended on 15 October 1950.

London entered the championship as the defending champions.

The All-Ireland final was played on 15 October 1950 at New Eltham GAA Grounds, between London and Cork, in what was their first meeting in the final since 1947. Cork won the match by 5–05 to 1–04 to claim their sixth championship title overall and a first title since 1947.

== Results ==
=== Connacht Junior Hurling Championship ===
==== Connacht final ====
6 August 1950 Final	Galway	6-06 - 5-04	Mayo	James Stephens Park

=== Leinster Junior Hurling Championship ===
==== Leinster first round ====
2 April 1950 First round	Dublin	3-05 - 2-01	Laois	Parnell Park

==== Leinster quarter-finals ====
2 April 1950 Quarter-final	Wicklow	5-04 - 4-02	Wexford	Aughrim County Ground

2 April 1950 Quarter-final	Carlow	3-01 - 7-04	Kilkenny	McGrath Park

16 April 1950 Quarter-final	Meath	5-02 - 2-01	Westmeath	St. Loman's Park

16 April 1950 Quarter-final	Offaly	1-04 - 3-04	Dublin	St. Conleth's Park

==== Leinster semi-finals ====
16 April 1950 Semi-final	Kilkenny	4-05 - 1-02	Wicklow	McGrath Park

26 May 1950 Semi-final	Dublin	10-13 - 2-02	Meath	Croke Park

==== Leinster final ====
25 June 1950 Final	Dublin	3-07 - 3-03	Kilkenny	Dr. Cullen Park

=== Munster Junior Hurling Championship ===
==== Munster first round ====
21 May 1950 First round	Limerick	4-04 - 5-04	Waterford	FitzGerald Park, Kilmallock

4 June 1950 First round	Clare	3-04 - 7-05	Tipperary	Cusack Park

==== Munster semi-finals ====
4 June 1950 Semi-final	Kerry	3-03 - 7-05	Cork	Kenmare Sportsfield

30 July 1950 Semi-final	Waterford	4-06 - 5-05	Tipperary	Waterford Sportsfield

==== Munster final ====
13 August 1950 Final	Cork	3-07 - 3-06	Tipperary	FitzGerald Park, Kilmallock

=== Ulster Junior Hurling Championship ===
==== Ulster first round ====
4 June 1950 First round	Antrim	3-09 - 1-02	Tyrone	Corrigan Park

==== Ulster semi-finals ====
2 July 1950 Semi-final	Donegal	5-02 - 3-05	Down	St. Tiernach's Park

9 July 1950 Semi-final	Antrim	6-03 - 5-01	Cavan	Dungannon GAA Grounds

==== Ulster final ====
30 July 1950 Final	Antrim	8-08 - 2-03	Donegal	Athletic Grounds

=== All-Ireland Junior Hurling Championship ===
==== All-Ireland semi-finals ====
27 August 1950 Semi-final	Galway	4-04 - 3-07	Dublin	Ballinasloe Sportsfield

27 August 1950 Semi-final	Cork	7-01 - 3-02	Antrim	Cork Athletic Grounds

10 September 1950 Semi-final replay	Dublin	5-04 - 2-08	Galway	St. Brendan's Park

==== All-Ireland home final ====
24 September 1950 Home final	Cork	3-04 - 2-05	Dublin	Waterford Sportsfield

==== All-Ireland final ====
15 October 1950 Final	London	1-04 - 5-05	Cork	New Eltham GAA Grounds
