= 1969 All-Ireland Minor Hurling Championship =

39th staging of All-Ireland Minor Hurling Championship

All-Ireland Minor Hurling Championship 1969
All Ireland Champions
- Winners: Cork (9th win)
- Captain: Seán Collins

All Ireland Runners-up
- Runners-up: Kilkenny
- Captain: Dinny McCormack

Provincial Champions
- Munster: Kilkenny
- Leinster: Cork
- Ulster: Antrim
- Connacht: Not Played

The 1969 All-Ireland Minor Hurling Championship was the 39th staging of the All-Ireland Minor Hurling Championship since its establishment by the Gaelic Athletic Association in 1928.

Wexford entered the championship as the defending champions. However, they were defeated in the Leinster semi-final.

On 7 September 1969, Cork won the championship following a 2–15 to 3–6 defeat of Kilkenny in the All-Ireland final. This was their ninth All-Ireland title and their first in two championship seasons.

== Results ==
=== Leinster Minor Hurling Championship ===
Semi-finals

6 July 1969 Semi-final	Dublin	4-3 - 0-13	Wexford	Dr. Cullen Park, Carlow

6 July 1969 Semi-final	Kilkenny	v	Laois	Croke Park, Dublin

Final

20 July 1969 Final	Kilkenny	3-9 - 2-7	Dublin	Croke Park, Dublin
	P Bollard 1-5, M Carroll 1-1, T Watters 0-3, T Neary 1-0.		J Cranley 0-5, J Kealy 1-0, J Brennan 1-0, M Forrestal 0-2.

=== Munster Minor Hurling Championship ===
Quarter-finals

11 May 1969 Quarter-final	Cork	4-16 - 4-6	Clare	Thurles Sportsfield, Thurles

1 June 1969 Quarter-final	Waterford	2-7 - 5-6	Tipperary	Walsh Park, Waterford

Semi-finals

22 June 1969 Semi-final	Tipperary	5-7 - 3-5	Limerick	Athletic Grounds, Cork

29 June 1969 Semi-final	Cork	9-11 - 1-1	Galway	Gaelic Grounds, Limerick

Final

27 July 1969 Final	Cork	1-12 - 2-4	Tipperary	Gaelic Grounds, Limerick
	S Farrell 1-1, T Sheehan 0-3, S O'Leary 0-3, M O'Doherty 0-2, N Crowley 0-2, P Coughlan 0-1.		J Cunningham 2-3, K Hough 0-1.	Referee: L Duggan (Galway)

=== All-Ireland Minor Hurling Championship ===
Semi-final

24 August 1969 Semi-final	Antrim	1-7 - 3-9	Kilkenny	Casement Park, Belfast
	A Thornbury 1-0, M Brunty 0-2, A Ryan 0-2, J O'Neill 0-2, E Dornan 0-1.		M Carroll 2-0, M O'Shea 1-0, T Watters 0-3, M Buggy 0-2, P Bollard 0-2, D O'Shea 0-1, G Burke 0-1.

Final

7 September 1969 Final	Cork	2-15 - 3-6	Kilkenny	Croke Park, Dublin
	T Sheehan 0-10 (5f), G Hanley 1-4, S O'Leary 1-1.		T Watters 1-2 (1-0f), R O'Shea 1-0, T Phelan 1-0, P Bollard 0-3 (f), M O'Shea 0-1.	Referee: J Rankins (Laois)
