= Bandon GAA =

Gaelic games club in County Cork, Ireland

Bandon
- Droichead na Banndan
- Founded: 1892
- County: Cork
- Nickname: The Lilywhites
- Colours
- Grounds: Charlie Hurley Park
- Coordinates: 51°44′22.13″N 8°44′34.23″W

Playing kits
Standard colours

Bandon GAA Club is a Gaelic Athletic Association club in Bandon, County Cork, Ireland. The club is affiliated to the Carbery Board and fields teams in both hurling and Gaelic football.

== History ==
Located in the town of Bandon in West Cork, Bandon GAA Club was established in 1892. The club was over 30 years old when it had its first major success by winning the Cork JFC title in 1925. Four years later, Bandon secured a Cork JHC–JFC double.

The club went on to dominate the newly-created divisional championships in both codes, with a record 16 South West JAFC titles being won between 1929 and 2015. Bandon have also won 13 South West JAHC titles. Further Cork JHC titles were won in 1949 and 1971, with both of these titles being followed by Cork IHC successes in 1952 and 1974 and senior status.

After slipping down the grades in the decades that followed, Bandon emerged with a young team in 1999 to win their fourth Cork JAHC title. This was followed by a third Cork IHC title, after a 2–14 to 0–07 win over Fr O'Neill's in 2011. Five years later, Bandon completed a Gaelic football–hurling double by winning the Cork PIHC title after a defeat of Fermoy, as well as the Cork IFC title after beating Rockchapel.

== Grounds ==
Bandon's home ground is Charlie Hurley Park. It is named in honour of IRA leader Charlie Hurley, who was killed during the War of Independence in March 1921. The official opening took place on 16 May 1971. It is frequently used as a venue for championship games in both hurling and Gaelic football between West Cork and city-based teams.

== Honours ==
- Cork Premier Intermediate Hurling Championship (1): 2016
- Cork Intermediate A Hurling Championship (4): 1952, 1974, 2011, 2026
- Cork Intermediate Football Championship (1): 2016
- Cork Junior A Hurling Championship (4): 1929, 1949, 1971, 1999
- Cork Junior A Football Championship (5): 1925, 1929, 1953, 1975, 2015
- South West Junior A Hurling Championship (13): 1929, 1934, 1935, 1936, 1937, 1949, 1960, 1971, 1975, 1990, 1995, 1999, 2009
- South West Junior A Football Championship (16): 1929, 1947, 1950, 1951, 1952, 1953, 1960, 1970, 1971, 1975, 1986, 1989, 2007, 2008, 2011, 2015
- South West Cork Junior B Hurling Championship (3): 1969, 1971, 1976
- South West Cork Junior B Football Championship (2): 1972, 2018
- West Cork Junior C Hurling Championship (2): 1997, 1999
- West Cork Junior C Football Championship (1): 1981
- Cork Senior Hurling League (1): 1977
- West Cork Under-21 Hurling Championship (14): 1970, 1971, 1972, 1974, 1975, 1976, 1977, 1978, 1996, 1999, 2005, 2006, 2009, 2012
- West Cork Under-21 Football Championship (6): 1973, 1974, 1975, 1976, 2005, 2008
- Cork Minor Hurling Championship (1): 1942
- Cork Minor A Hurling Championship (1): 1995
- Cork Minor A Football Championship (3): 1996, 2005, 2009
- Cork Minor B Football Championship (1): 2015
- West Cork Minor A Hurling Championship (22): 1941(?), 1942, 1943, 1944, 1954, 1963, 1965, 1966, 1968, 1969, 1970, 1971, 1972, 1973, 1974, 1975, 1976, 1987, 1995, 2003, 2004, 2008, 2022
- West Cork Minor A Football Championship (7): 1945, 1954, 1973, 1974, 1976, 1996, 2005
- West Cork Minor B Hurling Championship (2): 1984, 1985
- Feile na nGael Division 5 Cup (1): 2019

== Notable players ==
- Michael Cahalane: Munster SHC–winner (2017, 2018)
- Séan Crowley: All-Ireland JHC–winner (1950)
- Mark Sugrue: All-Ireland IHC–winner (2014)
- Robert Wilmot: All-Ireland SFC–winner (1973)
