= Daniel Hogan (hurler) =

Irish hurler (born 2002)

Personal information
- Native name: Dónall Ó hÓgáin (Irish)
- Born: 2002 (age 23–24) Glanmire, County Cork, Ireland
- Occupation: Student
- Height: 6 ft 0 in (183 cm)

Sport
- Sport: Hurling
- Position: Centre-forward
Club*
Years	Club	Apps (scores)
2020-present	Sarsfields	34 (8-91)
Club titles
- Cork titles: 2
- Munster titles: 1
- All-Ireland Titles: 0
College
- Years: College
- 2020-present: University College Cork
College titles
- Fitzgibbon titles: 0
Inter-county**
Years	County	Apps (scores)
2023-present	Cork	0 (0-00)
Inter-county titles
- Munster titles: 0
- All-Irelands: 0
- NHL: 1
- All Stars: 0
- * club appearances and scores correct as of 22:37, 16 November 2025. **Inter County team apps and scores correct as of 21:30, 9 March 2025.

Daniel Hogan (born 2002) is an Irish hurler. At club level, he plays with Sarsfields and at inter-county level with the Cork senior hurling team. Hogan usually lines out as a forward.

== Career ==
Hogan played hurling at all levels as a student at Glanmire Community College. After finishing his secondary schooling, he later lined out with University College Cork in the Fitzgibbon Cup. Hogan also won a Canon O'Brien Cup title with UCC in December 2023, after a 1–24 to 1–23 win over Cork.

At club level, Hogan first played for Sarsfields at juvenile and underage levels. He later progressed to the club's senior team and was part of the Sarsfields team that won the Cork PSHC title after a 0–21 to 0–19 defeat of Midleton in the 2023 final. Hogan claimed a Munster Club SHC medal in 2024, while he also won a Cork IAFC medal that year as a Gaelic footballer with Glanmire. He was at centre-forward when Sarsfields were beaten by Na Fianna in the 2025 All-Ireland club final.

Hogan first appeared on the inter-county scene with Cork as a member of the minor team in 2019. He immediately progressed to the under-20 team and won an All-Ireland U20HC medal as a member of the extended panel in 2020. Hogan joined the starting fifteen a year later and won a second set of Munster and All-Ireland U20HC medals after respective defeats of Limerick and Galway.

Hogan joined the senior team in 2025. He made his debut when he came on as a substitute for Brian Roche in a National Hurling League defeat of Clare in the March 2025.

== Career statistics ==
=== Club ===
As of match played 16 November 2025.

Team	Season	Cork		Munster		All-Ireland		Total	
Team	Season	Apps	Score	Apps	Score	Apps	Score	Apps	Score
Sarsfields	2020	4	2-02	—		—		4	2-02
Sarsfields	2021	4	4-03	—		—		4	4-03
Sarsfields	2022	3	0-05	—		—		3	0-05
Sarsfields	2023	6	0-03	1	0-01	—		7	0-04
Sarsfields	2024	5	0-44	2	0-11	2	0-05	9	0-60
Sarsfields	2025	6	0-14	1	2-03	—		7	2-17
Career total		28	6-71	4	2-15	2	0-05	34	8-91

=== Inter-county ===
As of 9 March 2025.

Team	Year	National League			Munster		All-Ireland		Total	
Team	Year	Division	Apps	Score	Apps	Score	Apps	Score	Apps	Score
Cork	2025	Division 1A	1	0-00	0	0-00	0	0-00	1	0-00
Career total			1	0-00	0	0-00	0	0-00	1	0-00

== Honours ==
Glanmire

- Cork Intermediate A Football Championship: 2024

Sarsfields

- Munster Senior Club Hurling Championship: 2024
- Cork Premier Senior Hurling Championship: 2023, 2025

Cork

- National Hurling League: 2025
- All-Ireland Under-20 Hurling Championship: 2020, 2021
- Munster Under-20 Hurling Championship: 2020, 2021
