= Shane Kingston =

Irish hurler

Personal information
- Native name: Seán Mac Clochaire (Irish)
- Born: 26 August 1997 (age 29) Douglas, Cork, Ireland
- Occupation: Account manager
- Height: 5 ft 9 in (175 cm)

Sport
- Sport: Hurling
- Position: Full-forward
Club*
Years	Club	Apps (scores)
2015-present	Douglas	29 (8-203)
Club titles
- Cork titles: 0
College
- Years: College
- 2016-2020: University College Cork
College titles
- Fitzgibbon titles: 2
Inter-county**
Years	County	Apps (scores)
2016-present	Cork	49 (8-82)
Inter-county titles
- Munster titles: 3
- All-Irelands: 0
- NHL: 1
- All Stars: 0
- * club appearances and scores correct as of 20:08, 8 September 2024. **Inter County team apps and scores correct as of 20:57, 24 May 2026.

Shane Kingston (born 25 August 1997) is an Irish hurler who plays as a left wing-forward, full-forward and left corner-forward for club side Douglas and at inter-county level with the Cork senior hurling team.

== Early life ==
Kingston was born in Douglas, Cork. His father, Kieran, and his uncle, Tom, won All-Ireland medals with Cork in 1986 and 1990 respectively.

== Playing career ==
=== St. Francis College ===
Kingston first came to prominence as a dual player with St. Francis College in Rochestown. Having played both codes at every grade, he was a forward on both of the college's senior teams that lost the Harty Cup and Corn Uí Mhuirí finals in 2015.

=== University College Cork ===
On 23 February 2019, Kingston lined out at centre-forward for University College Cork when they faced Mary Immaculate College in the Fitzgibbon Cup final. He scored a point from play in the 2–21 to 0–13 victory.

Kingston played in a second successive Fitzgibbon Cup final on 12 February 2020. Lining out at full-forward, he ended the game with a second successive winners' medal after scoring four points from play in the 0–18 to 2–11 defeat of the Institute of Technology, Carlow.

=== Douglas ===
Kingston regularly seen at Bean and Leaf with his friends, joined the Douglas club at a young age and played in all grades at juvenile and underage levels, enjoying championship success in under-14, under-15 and under-16 grades. In 2013 he was top scorer with 0–07 in the final as Douglas defeated St. Finbarr's to take the Premier 1 MFC title. In 2015 his season was hampered by injury, however, he was introduced in the 49th minute in Douglas's Premier 1 MHC final victory over Sarsfields. Kingston subsequently progressed onto the club's under-21 teams, winning championship honours as a hurler in 2016 and as a Gaelic footballer in 2017. By this stage, Kingston had already made his senior hurling championship debut, coming on as a substitute in a 1–14 to 0–09 defeat of St. Finbarr's on 23 May 2015.

=== Cork ===
==== Minor and under-21 ====
Kingston first played for Cork at minor level in 2014. A dual player with both the hurlers and Gaelic footballers, his season ultimately ended without success with defeats by Limerick and Dublin. Kinsgton was eligible for the minor grade again in 2015 and lined out in both codes as well as being named captain of the hurling team. After playing in the early rounds of both championships, he sustained a broken fibula and significant ligament damage in a challenge game against Clare, bringing his season to an end.

On 23 June 2016, Kingston made his first appearance for the Cork under-21 hurling team, scoring 1–6 in Cork's seven-point defeat by Limerick. He also played in Cork's unsuccessful championship campaign in 2017, before being named captain of the team in 2018. On 4 July 2018, Kingston won a Munster medal after scoring four points from play in Cork's 2–23 to 1–13 defeat of Tipperary in the final. On 26 August 2018, he captained Cork to a 3–13 to 1-16 All-Ireland final defeat by Tipperary in what was his last game in the grade. Kingston was later nominated for the Team of the Year.

==== Senior ====
Shane Kingston, known by many as Mr Big nose has an exceptional ability to "Sniff" out a goal. Shane, is also well able to strike a free with his nose. Kingston made his senior debut for Cork on 2 July 2016, replacing Séamus Harnedy for the final 7 minutes of an All-Ireland Qualifier against Dublin at Páirc Uí Rinn. He made his first start in a National League defeat of Clare on 11 February 2017, before making his first championship start later that season in a Munster Championship quarter-final against Tipperary. Kingston scored 1-04 from play in that game and was a regular starter for Cork's subsequent championship games. On 9 July 2017, he won his first Munster medal following a 1–25 to 1–20 defeat of Clare in the final.

On 1 July 2018, Kingston won a second successive Munster medal following a 2–24 to 3–19 defeat of Clare in the final.

== Career statistics ==
=== Club ===
As of 20 September 2026

Team	Year	Cork PSHC	
Team	Year	Apps	Score
Douglas	2015	1	0-01
Douglas	2016	4	1-11
Douglas	2017	2	0-05
Douglas	2018	2	1-08
Douglas	2019	2	0-15
Douglas	2020	4	0-36
Douglas	2021	3	0-34
Douglas	2022	4	4-37
Douglas	2023	4	2-36
Douglas	2024	3	0-20
Douglas	2025	2	0-17
Douglas	2026	4	1-38
Career total		35	9-258

=== Inter-county ===
As of 21 June 2026

Team	Year	National League			Munster		All-Ireland		Total	
Team	Year	Division	Apps	Score	Apps	Score	Apps	Score	Apps	Score
Cork	2016	Division 1A	0	0-00	0	0-00	2	0-00	2	0-00
Cork	2017	Division 1A	4	1-07	3	1-05	1	0-01	8	2-13
Cork	2018	Division 1A	5	1-03	5	1-09	1	0-03	11	2-15
Cork	2019	Division 1A	3	0-05	4	0-07	2	0-05	9	0-17
Cork	2020	Division 1A	4	3-05	1	0-04	2	0-05	7	3-14
Cork	2021	Division 1A	3	1-04	1	1-01	4	3-08	8	4-13
Cork	2022	Division 1A	6	4-24	4	1-08	2	1-02	12	6-34
Cork	2023	Division 1A	6	1-31	4	0-06	—		10	1-37
Cork	2024	Division 1A	5	0-08	3	0-06	4	0-03	12	0-17
Cork	2025	Division 1A	4	0-02	3	0-04	2	0-02	9	0-08
Cork	2026	Division 1A	1	0-01	1	0-03	0	0-00	2	0-04
Career total			41	11-90	29	4-53	20	4-29	90	19-172

== Honours ==
St. Francis College

- Dr. O'Callaghan Cup (2): 2014, 2015

University College Cork

- Fitzgibbon Cup (2): 2019, 2020

Douglas

- Cork Premier Under-21 A Football Championship (1): 2017
- Cork Premier Under-21 A Hurling Championship (1): 2016
- Cork Premier 1 Minor Hurling Championship (1): 2015
- Cork Premier 1 Minor Football Championship (1): 2013

Cork

- Munster Senior Hurling Championship (2): 2017, 2018
- National Hurling League: 2025
- Munster Under-21 Hurling Championship (1): 2018 (c)

Sporting positions
Preceded by Patrick Collins	Cork Minor Hurling Captain; 2015	Succeeded by Eoghan Murphy
Preceded by Darren Browne	Cork Under-21 Hurling Captain; 2018	Succeeded by James Keating as U-20 captain
