= 2023 Cork Premier Senior Hurling Championship =

Annual hurling competition season

- Dates: 6 June - 15 October 2023
- Teams: 12 clubs 6 divisions 1 university
- Sponsor: Co-Op Superstores
- Champions: Sarsfields (7th title); Conor O'Sullivan (captain); John Crowley (manager)
- Runners-up: Midleton; Conor Lehane (captain); Micheál Keohane (manager)
- Relegated: Glen Rovers

Tournament statistics
- Matches played: 34
- Goals scored: 73 (2.15 per match)
- Points scored: 1313 (38.62 per match)
- Top scorer(s): Ben Cunningham (1-58)

The 2023 Cork Premier Senior Hurling Championship was the fourth staging of the Cork Premier Senior Hurling Championship and the 135th staging overall of a championship for the top-ranking hurling teams in Cork. The draw for the group stage placings took place on 11 December 2022. The championship ran from 6 June to 15 October 2023.

St. Finbarr's entered the championship as the defending champions, however, they were beaten by Sarsfields in the semi-finals. 27-time champions Glen Rovers' relegation brought an end to 97 years of top tier hurling for the club.

The final was played on 15 October 2023 at Páirc Uí Chaoimh in Cork, between Sarsfields and Midleton, in what was second meeting in the final overall and a first meeting in 10 years. Sarsfields won the match by 0–21 to 0–19 to claim their seventh championship title overall and a first title in nine years.

Ben Cunningham was the championship's top scorer with 1-58.

== Team changes ==
=== To Championship ===
Promoted from the Cork Senior A Hurling Championship

- Fr. O'Neill's

=== From Championship ===
Relegated to the Cork Senior A Hurling Championship

- Na Piarsaigh

== Participating teams ==
=== Clubs ===
| Team | Location | Colours | Manager(s) | Captain(s) |
|---|---|---|---|---|
| Bishopstown | Bishopstown | Maroon and white | Glen O'Callaghan; Martin Hayes | |
| Blackrock | Blackrock | Green and yellow | Jamie Harrington | Niall Cashman; Kevin O'Keeffe |
| Charleville | Charleville | Red and white | Mark Foley | Jack Meade |
| Douglas | Douglas | Green, white and black | Denis O'Riordan | Donnchadh Murphy |
| Erin's Own | Glounthaune | Blue and red | Martin Bowen | |
| Fr. O'Neill's | Ballymacoda | Green and red | Dave Colbert; Bryan Sweeney | Declan Dalton; John Millerick |
| Glen Rovers | Blackpool | Green, black and yellow | Richie Kelleher | Stephen McDonnell |
| Kanturk | Kanturk | White and green | Tom Walsh | Lorcán McLoughlin |
| Midleton | Midleton | Black and white | Micheál Keohane | Conor Lehane |
| Newtownshandrum | Newtownshandrum | Green and yellow | | Tim O'Mahony |
| Sarsfields | Glanmire | Blue, black and white | Johnny Crowley | |
| St. Finbarr's | Togher | Blue and yellow | Ger Cunningham | Billy Hennessy |

=== Divisions and colleges ===
| Team | Location | Colours | Manager | Captain(s) |
|---|---|---|---|---|
| Avondhu | North Cork | Black and yellow | Joe O'Brien | Jack Twomey; Stephen Condon |
| Carbery | West Cork | Purple and yellow | Joe Ryan | Michael Cahalane |
| Carrigdhoun | Southeast Cork | Red and white | | Cormac Desmond |
| Duhallow | Duhallow | Orange and black | Donal O'Mahoney | Jack Murphy |
| Imokilly | East Cork | Red and white | Denis Ring | John Cronin; Ciarán O'Brien |
| Muskerry | Mid Cork | Green and white | Diarmuid Kirwan | Fenton Denny |
| University College Cork | College Road | Red and black | Tom Kenny | Seán Daly |

== Group A ==
=== Group A table ===
Knockout stage Relegation playoff

| Team | Matches | | | | Score | | | Pts |
| Team | Pld | W | D | L | For | Against | Diff | Pts |
|---|---|---|---|---|---|---|---|---|
| Midleton | 3 | 3 | 0 | 0 | 81 | 50 | 31 | 6 |
| Blackrock | 3 | 2 | 0 | 1 | 86 | 54 | 32 | 4 |
| Bishopstown | 3 | 1 | 0 | 2 | 53 | 94 | -41 | 2 |
| Glen Rovers | 3 | 0 | 0 | 3 | 62 | 84 | -22 | 0 |

=== Group A results ===
| 4 August 2023 Round 1 | Blackrock | 3-20 - 1-18 | Glen Rovers | Páirc Uí Rinn |
| | R Cotter 2-4, K O’Keeffe 0-5 (0-2f), T Deasy 1-2 (1-0 penalty), M O’Keeffe 0-4, D Meaney 0-3, M O’Halloran (0-1f), A Connolly 0-1 each. | Report | P Horgan 0-10 (0-7f), S Kennefick 1-2, D Brosnan 0-4, B Moylan, M Dooley 0-1 each. | Referee: C McAllister (Aghada) |

| 5 August 2023 Round 1 | Bishopstown | 1-13 - 1-27 | Midleton | Páirc Uí Rinn |
| | C Hegarty 0-5 (0-3f, 0-1 65), M McStay 1-0, P Morris, C Fitzpatrick (0-2f) 0-2 each, B Murray, P Honohan, D O’Donovan, L Lordan 0-1 each. | Report | C Lehane 0-8 (0-6f), C Beausang 0-6, D Cremin 1-3, M Finn, P Connaughton, L O’Farrell 0-3 each, P White 0-1. | Referee: S Scanlon (Newcestown) |

| 12 August 2023 Round 2 | Bishopstown | 0-10 - 2-33 | Blackrock | Páirc Uí Rinn |
| | B Murray 0-3, D Murray, D O’Donovan (0-2f) 0-2 each, P Morris, D Lester, C Fitzpatrick 0-1 each. | Report | R Cotter, T Deasy (1-0 penalty) 1-4 each, K O’Keeffe 0-6 (0-2f), N Cashman 0-4, M O’Halloran, P Linehan 0-3 each, Cathal Cormack, D Meaney, M O’Keeffe 0-2, F Coleman, S O’Keeffe, O McAdoo 0-1 each. | Referee: C O'Regan (Ballyhea) |

| 13 August 2023 Round 2 | Glen Rovers | 1-13 - 3-19 | Midleton | Páirc Séamus de Barra |
| | P Horgan 0-7 (0-5 f, 0-1 65), E Downey 1-0, S Lynam 0-2, R Downey, S Kennefick, L Coughlan, D Brosnan 0-1 each. | Report | L O’Farrell 2-1, C Lehane 0-5 (0-3 f), C Beausang 0-4 f, P White 1-1, P Connaughton, D Cremin 0-2 each, M Finn, E Moloney, R O’Regan, S O’Sullivan 0-1 each. | Referee: S Stokes (Tullylease) |

| 3 September 2023 Round 3 | Blackrock | 0-18 - 0-23 | Midleton | Páirc Séamus de Barra |
| | K O’Keeffe (0-7, 0-4 frees); A Connolly (0-3, 0-2 frees); N Cashman, M O’Halloran (0-2 each); Cathal Cormack, S O’Keeffe, P Lenihan, T Deasy (0-1 each). | Report | C Beausang (0-8, 0-7 frees); P Haughney (0-4); D Cremin P White (0-3 each); P Connaughton (0-2); E Moloney, T O’Connell (0-1 free), L O’Farrell (0-1 each). | Referee: S Stokes (Tullylease) |

| 3 September 2023 Round 3 | Glen Rovers | 2-19 - 2-21 | Bishopstown | Páirc Uí Rinn |
| | P Horgan 1-13 (0-9 f), D Brosnan 1-2, S Lynam 0-2, E O’Leary, E Downey 0-1 each. | Report | B Murray 0-6, C Hegarty 0-5 (0-1 f), B O’Driscoll 1-2, C Fitzpatrick 0-4 f, L Lordan 0-3, D Quaid 1-0, D Daly 0-1. | Referee: C Lyons (Nemo Rangers) |

== Group B ==
=== Group B table ===
Knockout stage

| Team | Matches | | | | Score | | | Pts |
| Team | Pld | W | D | L | For | Against | Diff | Pts |
|---|---|---|---|---|---|---|---|---|
| Charleville | 3 | 1 | 2 | 0 | 59 | 56 | 3 | 4 |
| Douglas | 3 | 2 | 0 | 1 | 68 | 57 | 11 | 4 |
| Fr. O'Neill's | 3 | 0 | 2 | 1 | 56 | 59 | -3 | 2 |
| Erin's Own | 3 | 0 | 2 | 1 | 56 | 67 | -11 | 2 |

=== Group B results ===
| 5 August 2023 Round 1 | Erin's Own | 0-17 - 2-22 | Douglas | Páirc Uí Rinn |
| | E Murphy 0-10 (0-8 f), P O’Shea, M O’Riordan (0-1f) 0-3 each, C Lenihan 0-1. | Report | S Kingston 1-11 (1-5 f), A Cadogan 1-3, C Kingston, C O’Donovan (0-1 sideline) 0-2 each, S Bourke, C Baldwin, B Turnbull, B Hartnett 0-1 each. | Referee: C O'Regan (Ballyhea) |

| 5 August 2023 Round 1 | Fr O'Neill's | 1-15 - 0-18 | Charleville | Bride Rovers Park |
| | D Dalton 1-7 (0-5 f, 0-1 sideline cut), B Dunne 0-3, K O’Sullivan 0-2, M O’Keeffe, Joe Millerick, J Hankard 0-1 each. | Report | D Fitzgibbon 0-5 (0-3 f), J Doyle, T Hawe 0-3 each, D O’Flynn, A Cagney 0-2 each, D Forde, O O’Connell, G Kelleher 0-1 each. | Referee: M Maher (St Finbarr's) |

| 12 August 2023 Round 2 | Douglas | 1-16 - 0-16 | Fr O'Neill's | Páirc Uí Rinn |
| | A Cadogan 0-4, B Hartnett 1-1, S Kingston (0-1f), M Dolan 0-3 each, C Baldwin 0-2, C O’Donovan, C Kingston, B Turnbull 0-1. | Report | D Dalton 0-7 (0-6f), C Broderick, K O’Sullivan 0-3 each, M O’Keeffe, John Millerick, B Dunne 0-1 each. | Referee: M Maher (St Finbarr's) |

| 13 August 2023 Round 2 | Charleville | 0-17 - 0-17 | Erin's Own | Mallow GAA Complex |
| | J Doyle 0-10 (0-7f), C Buckley, G Kelleher, J O’Callaghan, T Hawe, A Cagney, D Forde, O O’Connell 0-1 each. | Report | E Murphy 0-10 (0-8f, 0-1 65), M O’Riordan, P O’Shea 0-2 each, R Twomey, O O’Regan, S Irwin 0-1 each. | Referee: B Murphy (Carrigtwohill) |

| 3 September 2023 Round 3 | Erin's Own | 1-19 - 2-16 | Fr O'Neill's | Christy Ring Memorial Park |
| | E Murphy (0-7, 5f), O O’Regan (0-6, 3f, 1 65), R Twomey (1-2), K Murphy (0-2), P O’Shea and S Cronin (0-1 each). | Report | D Dalton (1-10, 6f), J Millerick (1-0), K O’Sullivan (0-3), J Hankard, Joe Millerick and M O’Keefe (0-1 each). | Referee: C McAllister (Aghada) |

| 3 September 2023 Round 3 | Douglas | 0-21 - 2-18 | Charleville | Mallow GAA Complex |
| | S Kingston 0-12 (0-8f), C O’Donovan, C Kingston 0-2 each, E Dolan, S Moylan, A Cadogan, S Bourke, E Cadogan 0-1 each. | Report | J Doyle 0-10 (0-7f), A Cagney 1-2, G Kelleher 0-3, C Buckley 1-0, J O’Callaghan 0-2, D O’Flynn 0-1, | Referee: C Lane (Banteer) |

== Group C ==
=== Group C table ===
Knockout stage Relegation playoff

| Team | Matches | | | | Score | | | Pts |
| Team | Pld | W | D | L | For | Against | Diff | Pts |
|---|---|---|---|---|---|---|---|---|
| Sarsfields | 3 | 2 | 1 | 0 | 79 | 66 | 13 | 5 |
| St. Finbarr's | 3 | 2 | 0 | 1 | 80 | 69 | 11 | 4 |
| Newtownshandrum | 3 | 1 | 0 | 2 | 64 | 78 | -14 | 2 |
| Kanturk | 3 | 0 | 1 | 2 | 62 | 72 | -10 | 1 |

=== Group C results ===
| 5 August 2023 Round 1 | St Finbarr's | 0-25 - 1-16 | Newtownshandrum | Mourneabbey Grounds |
| | B Cunningham 0-14 (0-7 f), W Buckley 0-3, E Twomey 0-2, P Beggy 0-2, S Cunningham, C Doolan, B Ramsey, D Cahalane 0-1 each. | Report | J Coughlan 1-12 (0-10 f, 0-1 65), C Naughton 0-2, T O’Mahony, R Geary 0-1 each. | Referee: S Stokes (Tullylease) |

| 5 August 2023 Round 1 | Kanturk | 1-16 - 0-19 | Sarsfields | Páirc Mac Gearailt |
| | L McLoughlin (f), R Sheahan (f), C Walsh 0-4 each, I Walsh 0-2, L O’Keeffe (f), C Clernon 0-1 each. | Report | A Myers 0-6 (0-5 f), C Darcy, K Murphy, Cathal McCarthy 0-2 each, P Leopold, D Kearney, J O’Connor, J Sweeney, D Hogan, L Healy, Colm McCarthy 0-1 each. | Referee: D Daly (Brian Dillons) |

| 11 August 2023 Round 2 | Sarsfields | 1-26 - 3-17 | St Finbarr's | Páirc Uí Rinn |
| | A Myers 0-10 (0-8f), L Hackett 1-1, J O’Connor, L Elliott 0-3 each, B Murphy, D Kearney 0-2 each, C Darcy, C O’Sullivan, Colm McCarthy, J Sweeney 0-1 each. | Report | B Cunningham 1-11 (1-0 penalty, 0-8f, 0-2 65), B Hayes, W Buckley 1-0 each, D Cahalane 0-2, S Cunningham, E Twomey, J Cahalane, E Finn 0-1 each. | Referee: S Scanlon (Newcestown) |

| 12 August 2023 Round 2 | Newtownshandrum | 2-18 - 1-19 | Kanturk | Dr Mannix Sportsfield |
| | J Coughlan 2-9 (0-6 f), T O’Mahony 0-3, C Naughton 0-2, C O’Brien, M Thompson, S Griffin, J Twomey 0-1 each. | Report | L McLoughlin 0-6 (0-5 f), Alan Walsh 1-2, C Walsh 0-3, R Sheahan (f), B O’Sullivan, I Walsh 0-2 each, J Browne, R Walsh 0-1 each. | Referee: B Sweeney (Shamrocks) |

| 3 September 2023 Round 3 | Newtownshandrum | 1-18 - 4-19 | Sarsfields | Mourneabbey Grounds |
| | J Coughlan (1-7, 4f); T O’Mahony (0-5, 3f, 1 65); R Troy (0-2, 1 65), C O’Brien, J Geary, C Naughton, M Thompson (0-1 each). | Report | A Myres (2-10 7f, 1 65); S O’Regan (1-1); C Darcy (1-0); J O’Connor, K Murphy, C McCarthy (0-2 each); B Murphy, L Hackett (0-1 each). | Referee: W King (Kilbrin) |

| 3 September 2023 Round 3 | St Finbarr's | 0-29 - 1-18 | Kanturk | Páirc Mac Gearailt |
| | B Cunningham (0-18, 0-16 frees), J Cahalane (0-3), C Cahalane, C Doolan and S Cunningham (0-2 each), B Hayes and W Buckley (0-1 each). | Report | B O’Sulliavn (0-7, 0-4 frees), C Walsh (1-1), I Walsh and Aidan Walsh (0-3 each), D Browne (0-2), Alan Walsh and P Walsh (0-1 each) | Referee: D Copps (Ballyhea) |

== Divisional/colleges section ==
=== Divisional/colleges section preliminary section ===
| 6 June 2023 Round 1 | Carrigdhoun | 0-11 - 1-16 | Muskerry | Páirc Liam Mhic Cárthaigh |
| | B Kelleher 0-7 (0-3 f 0-1 65), E O’Donovan 0-2, R Kelleher, S Andrews 0-1 each. | Report | E O’Shea 0-7 (0-2 f, 0-2 65), C O’Driscoll 1-1, D Kirwan 0-3, O O’Driscoll 0-2, C Dalton, M Verling, S Cronin 0-1 each. | Referee: I McCarthy (Bandon) |

| 6 June 2023 Round 1 | Avondhu | 1-24 - 2-13 | Carbery | Cloughduv Grounds |
| | C O’Brien 0-8 (0-4f, 0-1 sideline), S Condon 0-6 (0-2f), E Carey 0-5, W Condon 1-0, B Murphy 0-2, J Keating, J Twomey, J O’Sullivan 0-1 each. | Report | M Sexton 0-4 (0-3f), M Cahalane, B O’Donovan 1-1 each, D O’Donovan, C Long 0-2 each, S Murnan, P Wall 0-1 each. | Referee: P Lyons (Bishopstown) |

| 13 June 2023 Round 2 | Duhallow | 3-29 - 4-19 | Carrigdhoun | Mallow GAA Complex |
| | R Lynn 2-3; T Howard 1-6; l Philpott 0-8 (0-7 f); E Murphy, C O’Keeffe 0-3 each; J O’Callaghan, T Walsh 0-2 each, C King, C Murphy 0-1 each. | Report | B Kelleher 1-8 (0-6 f, 0-1 65); A O’Sullivan 1-4; S Andrews 1-2, M Murphy 1-1; R Kelleher 0-4. | Referee: D Copps (Ballyhea) |

| 20 June 2023 Round 3 | Carbery | 2-20 - 1-22 | Carrigdhoun | Páirc Uinsinn |
| | M Sexton 0-11 (0-9 f 0-1 65), D O’Donovan 1-2, M Cahalane 1-1, P Wall, J O’Donovan 0-2 each, L Murray, A O’Donovan 0-1 each. | Report | B Kelleher 0-7 (0-3 f), A O’Sullivan 0-6, R Kelleher 0-4, S Lombard 1-0, R McCarthy 0-3, C Desmond 0-2. | Referee: A Hyland (Kilworth) |

| 27 June 2023 Semi-final | Avondhu | 1-26 - 3-19 | Duhallow | Dromtarriffe Grounds |
| | S Condon 1-9 (0-5f), E Carey 0-5, J Twomey 0-3, J O’Sullivan 0-2, B Buckley 0-2, J Keating, B Curtin, J Quinn, L Keating, C Buckley 0-1 each. | Report | L Philpott 0-6 (0-5f), T Howard 0-4, B Murphy 1-1, R King 1-0, K Tarrant 1-0, S Howard, J Murphy 0-2, D O’Keeffe, E Murphy, C O’Callaghan, T Walsh, J O’Callaghan 0-1 each. | Referee: W Wallis (Aghada) |

| 27 June 2023 Semi-final | Muskerry | 3-21 - 1-14 | Carbery | Castletownkinneigh Grounds |
| | K Hallissey 1-3, E O’Shea 0-5 (0-1f), D Kirwan 0-4, T O’Connell 1-1, M Verling 0-4, S Joyce 1-0, M Bradley 0-2, F Denny, O O’Driscoll 0-1 each. | Report | M Sexton 0-7 (6f), G O’Donovan 1-2, B O’Donovan, J O’Donovan 0-2 each, E Ferguson 0-1. | Referee: B Coniry (Crosshaven) |

| 4 July 2023 Final | Avondhu | 2-23 - 1-15 | Muskerry | Páirc Uí Rinn |
| | S Condon (1-4, 0-2 frees), C O’Brien (0-6, 0-5 frees), W Condon (1-1), D Flynn and E Carey (0-4 each), J Magner (0-2), B Nyhan and C Buckley (0-1 each). | Report | E O’Shea (0-7, 0-5 frees, 0-1 65), M Bradley (1-1), K Hallissey (0-3), M Verling, T O’Connell, D Kirwan and O O’Driscoll (0-1 each). | Referee: N O'Neill (Midleton) |

=== Divisional/colleges section semi-final ===
| 23 August 2023 Semi-final | University College Cork | 1-18 - 0-28 | Avondhu | Mourneabbey Grounds |
| | R Fox 1-2, P McGarry, P Hynes 0-4 each, D Kearney 0-3, D Healy, R McEvoy, M Callanan, K Egan, P Cullinane 0-1 each. | Report | E Carey, S Condon (0-4 f) 0-8 each, C O’Brien 0-7 (0-3f, 0-1 sl), B Nyhan, J Magner 0-2 each, J Keating 0-1. | Referee: S Stokes (Tullylease) |

=== Divisional/colleges section final ===
| 26 August 2023 Final | Imokilly | 0-25 - 0-20 | Avondhu | Páirc Uí Rinn |
| | S Desmond, J Leahy (0-3f, 0-1 65) 0-5 each, S Hegarty 0-4, W Leahy 0-3 (0-2f), B Cooper, D Healy 0-2 each, J Stack, S Harnedy, Brian Lawton, Barry Lawton 0-1 each. | Report | S Condon 0-5 (0-1f), E Carey 0-4, C O’Brien (0-2f), B Buckley 0-3 each, B Curtin, J Twomey, B Nyhan, C Buckley, W Condon 0-1 each. | Referee: S Scanlon (Newcestown) |

== Knockout stage ==
=== Bracket ===
Quarter-Finals
Charleville
St Finbarr's
Douglas
Imokilly
Blackrock
Sarsfields

Semi-Finals
Midleton
TBD
TBD
TBD

Final
TBD
TBD

=== Relegation playoff ===
| 16 September 2023 Playoff | Glen Rovers | 1-13 - 1-16 | Kanturk | Páirc Mac Gearailt |
| | P Horgan 0-7 (0-3 f), D Brosnan 1-1, D Noonan, B Moylan, S Kennefick, S Busteed, L Quilligan 0-1 each. | Report | B O’Sullivan 0-8 (0-5 f), L O’Keeffe 1-1, Alan Walsh 0-3, C Walsh 0-2, I Walsh, L McLoughlin 0-1 each. | Referee: C McAllister (Aghada) |

=== Quarter-finals ===
| 16 September 2023 Quarter-final | Charleville | 0-15 - 1-22 | St Finbarr's | Páirc Uí Chaoimh |
| | J Doyle (0-3f), C Buckley 0-4 each, D O’Flynn, J O’Callaghan 0-2 each, G Kelleher, O O’Connell, D Forde 0-1 each. | Report | B Cunningham 0-9 (0-4f), J Cahalane, W Buckley 0-4 each, B Hayes 1-0, P Buggy 0-2, C Cahalane, D Cahalane, S Cunningham 0-1 each. | Referee: N O'Neill (Midleton) |

| 17 September 2023 Quarter-final | Blackrock | 0-15 - 1-15 | Sarsfields | Páirc Uí Chaoimh |
| | K O’Keeffe (0-2f, 0-1 65), F Coleman 0-4 each, R Cotter 0-3, M O’Halloran, T Deasy, A Connolly, M O’Keeffe 0-1 each. | Report | A Myers 0-6f, J O’Connor 1-3, D Kearney 0-2, K Murphy, Colm McCarthy, L Hackett 0-1 each. | Referee: C O'Regan (Ballyhea) |

| 17 September 2023 Quarter-final | Imokilly | 1-29 - 1-16 | Douglas | Páirc Uí Chaoimh |
| | S Desmond 1-6, M Kelly 0-7 (0-4f), D Healy 0-4, S Harnedy, J Leahy 0-3 each, B Cooper, Barry Lawton 0-2 each, W Leahy, S Hegarty 0-1 each. | Report | S Kingston 1-10 (0-5f, 0-1 65), C Kingston, A Cadogan 0-2 each, E Dolan, C Lucas 0-1 each. | Referee: S Scanlon (Newcestown) |

=== Semi-finals ===
| 1 October 2023 Semi-final | Imokilly | 0-25 - 1-23 (aet) | Sarsfields | Páirc Uí Chaoimh |
| | M Kelly 0-7f, W Leahy 0-4f, D Healy, S Harnedy 0-3 each, Barry Lawton, B Cooper 0-2 each, Brian Lawton, J Leahy, S Desmond, E Davis (0-1f) 0-1 each. | Report | A Myers 0-7 (0-2f, 0-2 65), Cathal McCarthy 0-5, L Elliott 1-0, K Murphy, B Murphy, Colm McCarthy, J O’Connor 0-2 each, C Darcy, S O’Regan, D Hogan 0-1 each. | Referee: S Stokes (Tullylease) |

| 1 October 2023 Semi-final | Midleton | 1-17 - 0-18 | St Finbarr's | Páirc Uí Chaoimh |
| | C Lehane (0-9, 0-2 ‘65s, 0-5 frees), C Beausang (1-1), B Saunderson, E Moloney, S O’Leary Hayes, M Finn, L O’Farrell, R O’Regan and D Cremin (0-1 each). | Report | B Cunningham (0-6, 0-2 ‘65s, 0-3 frees), W Buckley (0-4), E Twomey, B Hayes and C Cahalane (0-2 each), E Finn and B Hennessy (0-1 each). | Referee: C Lyons (Nemo Rangers) |

=== Final ===
| 15 October 2023 Final | Sarsfields | 0-21 - 0-19 | Midleton | Páirc Uí Chaoimh |
| | A Myers 0-12 (0-8f), Cathal McCarthy 0-4, J O’Connor 0-2, D Kearney, Colm McCarthy, D Hogan 0-1 each. | Report | C Lehane 0-7 (0-4f), R O’Regan 0-3, P Haughney, M Finn (0-1 sideline) 0-2 each, T O’Connell, S O’Sullivan, P White, C Beausang, T O’Leary Hayes 0-1 each. | Attendance: 11,645; Referee: C O'Regan (Ballyhea) |

== Championship statistics ==
=== Top scorers ===
Overall

| Rank | Player | Club | Tally | Total | Matches | Average |
|---|---|---|---|---|---|---|
| 1 | Ben Cunningham | St Finbarr's | 1-58 | 61 | 5 | 12.20 |
| 2 | Aaron Myers | Sarsfields | 2-51 | 57 | 6 | 9.50 |
| 3 | Patrick Horgan | Glen Rovers | 2-37 | 43 | 4 | 10.75 |
| 4 | Shane Kingston | Douglas | 2-36 | 42 | 4 | 10.50 |
| 5 | Jamie Coughlan | Newtownshandrum | 4-28 | 40 | 3 | 13.33 |
| 6 | Stephen Condon | Avondhu | 2-32 | 38 | 5 | 7.60 |
| 6 | Declan Dalton | Fr O'Neill's | 2-24 | 30 | 3 | 10.00 |
| 8 | Conor Lehane | Midleton | 0-29 | 29 | 4 | 7.25 |
| 9 | Eoghan Murphy | Erin's Own | 0-27 | 27 | 3 | 9.00 |
| 9 | Jack Doyle | Charleville | 0-27 | 27 | 4 | 6.75 |

In a single game

| Rank | Player | Club | Tally | Total | Opposition |
|---|---|---|---|---|---|
| 1 | Ben Cunningham | St Finbarr's | 0-18 | 18 | Kanturk |
| 2 | Aaron Myers | Sarsfields | 2-10 | 16 | Newtownshandrum |
| 2 | Patrick Horgan | Glen Rovers | 1-13 | 16 | Bishopstown |
| 4 | Jamie Coughlan | Newtownshandrum | 2-09 | 15 | Kanturk |
| 4 | Jamie Coughlan | Newtownshandrum | 1-12 | 15 | St Finbarr's |
| 6 | Shane Kingston | Douglas | 1-11 | 14 | Erin's Own |
| 6 | Ben Cunningham | St Finbarr's | 1-11 | 14 | Sarsfields |
| 6 | Ben Cunningham | St Finbarr's | 0-14 | 14 | Newtownshandrum |
| 9 | Declan Dalton | Fr O'Neill's | 1-10 | 13 | Erin's Own |
| 9 | Shane Kingston | Douglas | 1-10 | 13 | Imokilly |

=== Miscellaneous ===
- Sarsfields qualify for the final for the first time since 2015.
- Sarsfields win the title for the first time since 2014.
- 27-time champions Glen Rovers' relegation brought an end to 97 years of top tier hurling for the club.
