= Jamie Coughlan =

Irish hurler

Personal information
- Native name: Séamus Ó Cochláin (Irish)
- Nickname: Jimenez
- Born: 13 January 1992 (age 34) Newtownshandrum, County Cork, Ireland
- Occupation: Farm manager
- Height: 5 ft 10 in (178 cm)

Sport
- Sport: Hurling
- Position: Right corner-forward
Club*
Years	Club	Apps (scores)
2009-present	Newtownshandrum	57 (27-267)
Club titles
- Cork titles: 1
- Munster titles: 1
College
- Years: College
- 2011-2016: Cork Institute of Technology
College titles
- Fitzgibbon titles: 0
Inter-county**
Years	County	Apps (scores)
2011-2019	Cork	19 (3-15)
Inter-county titles
- Munster titles: 2
- All-Irelands: 0
- NHL: 0
- All Stars: 0
- * club appearances and scores correct as of 22:25, 20 October 2024. **Inter County team apps and scores correct as of 19:19, 7 July 2019.

Jamie Coughlan (born 13 January 1992) is an Irish hurler who plays for Cork Senior Championship club Newtownshandrum and at inter-county level with the Cork senior hurling team. He currently lines out as a right corner-forward.

== Playing career ==
=== Newtownshandrum ===
Coughlan joined the Newtownshandrum club at the age of five and played in all grades at juvenile and underage levels with amalgamated side Shandrum. Om 23 October 2010, he was an unused substitute when Newtownshandrum defeated Duhallow by 1–19 to 1–16 to win the Cork Under-21 Championship.

On 3 May 2009, Coughlan made his first championship appearance at senior level when Newtownshandrum defeated Glen Rovers by 2–15 to 1–12. On 11 October, he scored 1-01 from right corner-forward when Newtownshandrum defeated Sarsfields by 3–22 to 1–12 to win the Cork Senior Championship. Coughlan's debut season ended with further success on 29 November following Newtownshandrum's 2–11 to 2–09 defeat of Ballygunner to win the Munster Championship.

=== Cork ===
==== Minor and under-21 ====
Coughlan first played for Cork at minor level on 25 June 2008 and scored two goals after being introduced as a substitute in Cork's 4–13 to 1-06 Munster Championship defeat of Waterford. On 13 July, Coughlan started on the bench but was once again introduced as a substitute in Cork's 0–19 to 0-18 Munster final defeat of Tipperary.

On 15 July 2011, Coughlan made his debut in the under-21 grade in a 4–19 to 1–21 defeat of Tipperary. He top scored with 0–12 in the subsequent 1–27 to 4-20 Munster final defeat by Limerick.

==== Senior ====
Coughlan made his first appearance for the Cork senior team on 23 January 2011 and scored seven points in a 3–17 to 1–22 defeat of University College Cork in the pre-season Waterford Crystal Cup. He was an unused substitute throughout the subsequent National Hurling League and Munster Championship. Coughlan made his championship debut on 18 June, scoring two goals, in Cork's 10–20 to 1-13 All-Ireland Qualifier defeat of Laois.

On 11 March 2012, Coughlan made his first appearance in the National Hurling League. He was introduced as a 59th-minute substitute for Ben O'Connor in a 2–18 to 2–17 defeat of Dublin.

On 8 September 2013, Coughlan lined out at left corner-forward in the All-Ireland final against Clare having earlier lost the Munster final to Limerick. He was held scoreless during the game which ended in a draw. Coughlan was dropped in favour of Cian McCarthy for the subsequent replay on 28 September, which saw Cork lose by 5–16 to 3–16.

On 13 July 2014, Coughlan was an unused substitute when Cork won the Munster Championship after a 2–24 to 2–18 defeat of Limerick in the final.

After failing to secure a regular place on the starting fifteen, Coughlan contemplated leaving the panel in favour of travel in June 2015. He remained with the team and lined out in Cork's subsequent championship games that season.

In January 2016, Coughlan was effectively dropped from the Cork senior team when he failed to be included on Kieran Kingston's panel for the 2016 National Hurling League.

Kingston's departure saw Coughlan return to the Cork panel under new manager John Meyler. On 1 July 2018, he won a second Munster Championship medal as an unused substitute following a 2–24 to 3–19 defeat of Clare in the final.

== Career statistics ==
=== Club ===
As of 6 September 2026

Team	Season	Cork		Munster		All-Ireland		Total	
Team	Season	Apps	Score	Apps	Score	Apps	Score	Apps	Score
Newtownshandrum	2009	5	1-05	3	1-02	1	0-00	9	2-07
Newtownshandrum	2010	3	1-02	—		—		3	1-02
Newtownshandrum	2011	4	0-12	—		—		4	0-12
Newtownshandrum	2012	3	0-08	—		—		3	0-08
Newtownshandrum	2013	2	1-08	—		—		2	1-08
Newtownshandrum	2014	3	0-24	—		—		3	0-24
Newtownshandrum	2015	3	3-04	—		—		3	3-04
Newtownshandrum	2016	3	2-06	—		—		3	2-06
Newtownshandrum	2017	3	1-09	—		—		3	1-09
Newtownshandrum	2018	3	2-28	—		—		3	2-28
Newtownshandrum	2019	4	4-29	—		—		4	4-29
Newtownshandrum	2020	3	3-20	—		—		3	3-20
Newtownshandrum	2021	3	1-22	—		—		3	1-22
Newtownshandrum	2022	4	0-35	—		—		4	0-35
Newtownshandrum	2023	3	4-28	—		—		3	4-28
Newtownshandrum	2024	4	3-25	—		—		4	3-25
Newtownshandrum	2025	3	0-19	—		—		3	0-19
Newtownshandrum	2026	3	1-28	—		—		3	1-28
Career total		59	27-312	3	1-02	1	0-00	63	28-314

=== Inter-county ===
As of match played 14 July 2019.

Team	Year	National League			Munster		All-Ireland		Totat	
Team	Year	Division	Apps	Score	Apps	Score	Apps	Score	Apps	Score
Cork	2011	Division 1A	0	0-00	0	0-00	2	2-00	2	2-00
Cork	2012	Division 1A	5	0-04	1	0-03	4	1-04	10	1-11
Cork	2013	Division 1A	0	0-00	2	0-04	3	0-02	5	0-06
Cork	2014	Division 1B	2	0-03	1	0-00	1	0-00	4	0-03
Cork	2015	Division 1A	2	0-00	0	0-00	2	0-01	4	0-01
Cork	2016	Division 1A	—		—		—		—	
Cork	2017	Division 1A	—		—		—		—	
Cork	2018	Division 1A	0	0-00	2	0-00	0	0-00	2	0-00
Cork	2019	Division 1A	3	1-01	0	0-00	1	0-01	4	1-02
Career total			12	1-08	6	0-07	13	3-08	31	4-23
