= 2025 Cork Premier Senior Hurling Championship =

Annual hurling competition season

- Dates: 10 June - 19 October 2025
- Teams: 12 clubs 5 divisions 1 university
- Sponsor: Co-Op Superstores
- Champions: Sarsfields (8th title); Conor O'Sullivan (captain); Johnny Crowley (manager)
- Runners-up: Midleton; Luke Dineen (captain); Micheál Keohane (manager)
- Relegated: Erin's Own

Tournament statistics
- Matches played: 33
- Goals scored: 85 (2.58 per match)
- Points scored: 1294 (39.21 per match)
- Top scorer(s): Patrick Horgan (5-39)

The 2025 Cork Premier Senior Hurling Championship is the sixth staging of the Cork Premier Senior Hurling Championship and the 137th staging overall of a championship for the top-ranking hurling teams in Cork. The draw for the group stage placings took place on 10 December 2024. The championship is scheduled to run from 10 June to 19 October 2025.

Imokilly entered the championship as the defending champions, however, they were beaten by St Finbarr's in the quarter-finals. Erin's Own's relegation brought an end to 38 years of top tier hurling for the club.

The final was played on 19 October 2025 at SuperValu Páirc Uí Chaoimh in Cork, between Sarsfields and Midleton, in what was their third meeting in the final overall and a first meeting in two years. Sarsfields won the match by 2–18 to 1–14 to claim their eighth championship title overall and a first title in two years.

Patrick Horgan was the championship's top scorer with 5–39.

== Team changes ==
=== To Championship ===
Promoted from the Cork Senior A Hurling Championship

- Glen Rovers

=== From Championship ===
Relegated to the Cork Senior A Hurling Championship

- Bishopstown

== Participating teams ==
=== Clubs ===
Team	Location	Colours	Manager	Captain(s)
Blackrock	Blackrock	Green and yellow	Jamie Harrington	John Cashman
Charleville	Charleville	Red and white	Dominic Foley	Darren Butler
Douglas	Douglas	Green, white and black	Fergus Ryan	
Erin's Own	Glounthaune	Blue and red	Shay Bowen	Robbie O'Flynn; Riain O'Regan
Fr. O'Neill's	Ballymacoda	Green and red	Ray O'Neill	
Glen Rovers	Blackpool	Green, yellow and black	Tomás Mulcahy	Dean Brosnan
Kanturk	Kanturk	White and green	Tom Walsh	Brian O'Sullivan
Midleton	Midleton	Black and white	Micheál Keohane	Luke Dineen; Conor Lehane
Newcestown	Newcestown	Red and yellow	Niall O'Sullivan	James Kelleher
Newtownshandrum	Newtownshandrum	Green and yellow	Gary Morrissey	James Bowles
Sarsfields	Glanmire	Blue, black and white	Johnny Crowley	Conor O'Sullivan
St. Finbarr's	Togher	Blue and yellow	Ger Cunningham	Jamie Burns

=== Divisions and colleges ===
Team	Location	Colours	Manager	Captain
Avondhu	North Cork	Black and yellow	Liam Kenny	Liam Cronin
Carbery	West Cork	Purple and yellow	David Whyte	
Duhallow	Duhallow	Orange and black		
Imokilly	East Cork	Red and white	Denis Ring	Brian Lawton
Muskerry	Mid Cork	Green and white	Diarmuid Kirwan	
University College Cork	College Road	Red and black	Paddy Crowley	Eoin Guinane

== Group 1 ==
=== Group 1 table ===
Quarter-finalist Relegation playoff

Team	Matches				Score			Pts
Team	Pld	W	D	L	For	Against	Diff	Pts
Sarsfields	3	3	0	0	102	66	36	6
Glen Rovers	3	2	0	1	72	66	6	4
Fr O'Neill's	3	1	0	2	64	79	-15	2
Erin's Own	3	0	0	3	68	95	-27	0

=== Group 1 results ===
1 August 2025 Round 1	Fr O'Neill's	1-14 - 1-28	Sarsfields	Páirc Séamus de Barra
	D Dalton 0-7 (5f, 0-1 65, 0-1 sl), R Cullinane 1-0, K O’Sullivan (f), P McMahon, John Millerick 0-2 each, Joe Millerick 0-1.	Report	Colm McCarthy 0-8 (0-4 f, 0-1 65), C Darcy 1-3, J O’Connor 0-5, J Sweeney 0-3, S O’Regan, D Hogan, K Murphy, B Nodwell 0-2 each, Cathal McCarthy 0-1.

2 August 2025 Round 1	Erin's Own	1-15 - 1-22	Glen Rovers	Páirc Uí Rinn
	R O’Flynn 0-6 (0-1 f), F O’Brien 1-3, E Murphy 0-3, C Lenihan 0-2, M O’Riordan 0-1.	Report	P Horgan 0-11 (0-4 f, 0-1 65), E O’Leary 1-0, S Lynam, L Horgan 0-2 each, E Downey, R Downey, C McCarthy, M Mullins, R Dunne, D Wall, L Quilligan 0-1 each.

16 August 2025 Round 2	Sarsfields	4-30 - 3-15	Erin's Own	Páirc Uí Rinn
	J O’Connor 1-8, J Sweeney 2-0, Colm McCarthy 0-5 (0-3 f), K Murphy 1-2, D Hogan 0-5, C Darcy, Cathal McCarthy, C O’Sullivan, B Murphy 0-2 each, S O’Regan, B Graham 0-1 each.	Report	R O’Flynn 1-4 (1-2 f), C O’Callaghan 2-0, C Lenihan 0-5, E Murphy, P O’Shea, O O’Regan, T Dillon (f), C Dunphy 0-1 each.

17 August 2025 Round 2	Fr O'Neill's	0-19 - 1-19	Glen Rovers	Clonmult Memorial Park
	D Dalton 0-12 (0-8 f, 0-2 65), K O’Sullivan 0-3, John Millerick 0-2, R Cullinane, M Wall 0-1 each.	Report	P Horgan 1-9 (1-0 pen, 0-6 f, 0-2 65), M Mullins 0-4, S Kennefick 0-3, E O’Leary, S Lynam, L Quillligan 0-1 each.

7 September 2025 Round 3	Fr O'Neill's	3-19 - 4-14	Erin's Own	Killeagh Grounds
	D Dalton (1-9, 1-7 frees, 0-1 ’65), B Dunne and R Cullinane (1-0 each), Joseph Millerick and John Millerick (0-3 each), T Millerick, K O’Sullivan, P Hassett and T O’Donoghue Brosnan (0-1 each).	Report	R O’Flynn (1-7, 1-4 frees, 0-2 ’65), C Lenihan (1-3), P O’Shea (1-1), R Twomey (1-0), F O’Brien (0-2), C O’Callaghan (0-1).

7 September 2025 Round 3	Sarsfields	2-23 - 2-19	Glen Rovers	Páirc Uí Rinn
	Colm McCarthy 0-7 (0-6 f, 0-1 65), B O’Flynn 2-0, D Hogan 0-5, J Sweeney, D Kearney 0-3 each, C O’Sullivan, B Murphy, K Murphy, C Darcy, S O’Regan 0-1 each.	Report	P Horgan 2-10 (1-4 f, 0-1 65), D Brosnan 0-4, M Mullins 0-2, E Downey (0-1 f), R Downey, E O’Leary 0-1 each.

== Group 2 ==
=== Group 2 table ===
Quarter-finalist Relegation playoff

Team	Matches				Score			Pts
Team	Pld	W	D	L	For	Against	Diff	Pts
Midleton	3	2	1	0	69	54	15	5
Charleville	3	2	0	1	70	59	11	4
Newcestown	3	1	1	1	66	70	-4	3
Newtownshandrum	3	0	0	3	57	79	-22	0

=== Group 2 results ===
2 August 2025 Round 1	Midleton	0-25 - 0-19	Newtownshandrum	Páirc Uí Chaoimh
	C Lehane 0-9 (0-5 f, 0-1 65), D Cremin, C Beausang. A Quirke 0-3 each, P White 0-2, S O’Meara, T O’Connell, K McDermott, M Finn 0-1 each.	Report	T O’Mahony 0-11 (0-10 f), C O’Brien 0-2, R Troy, D O’Connor, E O’Mahony, R Geary, M Ryan, T O’Neill 0-1 each.

3 August 2025 Round 1	Charleville	2-23 - 0-18	Newcestown	Grenagh Grounds
	D Fitzgibbon 0-11 (0-6 f, 0-1 65), D O’Flynn 1-2, C Buckley 0-3, T Hawe 1-0, Z Biggane, S Bresnan 0-2 each, J Callaghan, R Carroll (f), G Kelleher 0-1 each.	Report	R O’Sullivan 0-10 (0-7 f, 0-2 65), S O’Sullivan, D Buckley 0-2 each, L Meade (f), E Kenneally, C Dinneen, C Hurley 0-1 each.

16 August 2025 Round 2	Midleton	1-15 - 0-18	Newcestown	Páirc Uí Rinn
	C Lehane 0-7 f, T O’Connell 1-0, M Finn, C Beausang 0-2 each, B Saunderson (f), P White, D Cremin, R O’Regan 0-1 each.	Report	R O’Sullivan 0-11 (0-10 f), D Buckley 0-4, L Meade 0-2, C Dinneen 0-1.

17 August 2025 Round 2	Newtownshandrum	0-15 - 1-21	Charleville	Páirc Mhic Ghiobúin
	J Coughlan 0-6 (0-4 f), T O'Mahony 0-4 (0-1 f, 0-1 65), C Twomey (0-1 sl), C O'Brien, T O'Neill, C Griffin, M Ryan 0-1 each.	Report	D Fitzgibbon 0-7 (0-3 f), G Kelleher 1-1, Z Biggane, C Buckley 0-3 each, S Bresnan 0-2, R O'Carroll, D O'Flynn, D Forde, T Hawe, J Callaghan 0-1 each.

7 September 2025 Round 3	Midleton	1-23 - 1-14	Charleville	Páirc Mhic Gearailt
	C Lehane 0-10 (0-4 f), A Quirke 1-2, C Beausang, M Finn, K McDermott, P White 0-2 each, S O’Meara, D Cremin, L O’Farrell 0-1 each.	Report	D Fitzgibbon 0-11 (0-5 f), T Hawe 1-0, D Forde 0-2, G Kelleher 0-1.

7 September 2025 Round 3	Newtownshandrum	1-20 - 3-21	Newcestown	Blarney Grounds
	J Coughlan (0-3 frees) and C Griffin (0-5 each), T O’Mahony (0-4, 0-3 frees), M Lenihan (1-0), C Twomey and T O’Neill (0-2 each), M Ryan and K O’Sullivan (0-1 each).	Report	R O’Sullivan (2-10, 1-0 pen, 0-6 frees, 0-2 65s), J Meade (1-2, 0-1 sl), E Kenneally and G O’Donovan (0-2 each), C O’Donovan, L Meade, S O’Sullivan, D Buckley and C Dinneen (0-1 each).

== Group 3 ==
=== Group 3 table ===
Semi-finalist Quarter-finalist

Team	Matches				Score			Pts
Team	Pld	W	D	L	For	Against	Diff	Pts
Blackrock	3	3	0	0	87	49	38	6
St Finbarr's	3	2	0	1	73	70	3	4
Kanturk	3	0	1	2	59	69	-10	1
Douglas	3	0	1	2	51	82	-31	1

=== Group 3 results ===
1 August 2025 Round 1	Douglas	0-19 - 1-25	St Finbarr's	Páirc Uí Rinn
	S Kingston (0-7, 2f, 1 '65), C Kingston (0-5), A Cadogan (0-3, 2f), J Harte, Conor O’Donovan, Cillian O’Donovan, R Dooley (0-1 each).	Report	B Cunningham (0-11, 4f, 4 '65), W Buckley (0-7), J Cahalane (1-2), B Hennessy, E Twomey, C Cahalane, C Crowley, J O’Kelly (0-1 each).

2 August 2025 Round 1	Blackrock	1-20 - 0-18	Kanturk	Mallow GAA Complex
	A Connolly 0-5 (0-4 f), M O’Halloran 1-2, R Sweeney 0-3, R Cotter, T Deasy, K O’Keeffe 0-2 each, G Connolly (f), N Cashman, D O’Farrell, D Meaney 0-1 each.	Report	R Sheahan 0-8 (0-6 f), B O’Sullivan 0-7 (0-4 f), D Browne, I Walsh, L McLoughlin 0-1 each.

15 August 2025 Round 2	Blackrock	2-25 - 2-14	St Finbarr's	Páirc Uí Rinn
	A Connolly 0-7 (0-3 f, 0-1 65), M O’Halloran 2-1, N Cashman 0-4, R Cotter, R Sweeney 0-3 each, K O’Keeffe 0-2, J Cashman, P Linehan, F Coleman, G Connolly (f) 0-1 each.	Report	B Cunningham 2-9 (1-0 penalty, 0-8 f), E Twomey, C Cahalane, B Hayes, W Buckley, J Cahalane 0-1 each.

16 August 2025 Round 2	Kanturk	2-15 - 0-21	Douglas	Castletownroche Grounds
	R Sheahan 1-4 (0-4 f), B O’Sullivan 1-3, C Walsh 0-3, A Walsh 0-2, T Walsh, P Walsh, I Walsh 0-1 each.	Report	S Kingston 0-10 (0-4 f, 0-2 65), C O’Donovan 0-3, R Dooley, D Harte 0-2 each, M Howell, C Kingston, A Cadogan, J Harte 0-1 each.

7 September 2025 Round 3	Blackrock	0-33 - 0-11	Douglas	Carrigaline Grounds
	K O’Keeffe, M O’Halloran, R Cotter 0-7 each, A Connolly 0-6 (0-3 f), N Cashman 0-2, Cathal Cormack, D Meaney, Ciarán Cormack, F Coleman 0-1 each.	Report	A Cadogan 0-4 f, J Harte, S Barron, R Dooley 0-2 each, Conor O’Donovan 0-1.

7 September 2025 Round 3	Kanturk	1-17 - 0-25	St Finbarr's	Mourneabbey Grounds
	B O’Sullivan (0-6, 0-5 f); A Walsh (1-1); R Sheahan (0-3 frees), L O’Neill (0-3 each); C Walsh, D O’Connell (0-2 each).	Report	B Cunningham (0-10, 0-7 f, 0-2 65s); E Twomey, W Buckley, S Cunningham (0-3 each); C Cahalane, J Cahalane (0-2 each); B Hennessy, C McCarthy (0-1 each).

== Division/colleges section ==
=== Division/colleges section group stage ===
Division/colleges section semi-finals

Team	Matches				Score			Pts
Team	Pld	W	D	L	For	Against	Diff	Pts
Avondhu	2	2	0	0	74	30	44	4
Muskerry	2	2	0	0	51	40	11	4
Carbery	2	0	0	2	35	62	-27	0
Duhallow	2	0	0	2	35	63	-28	0

=== Division/colleges section group stage results ===
10 June 2025 Round 1	Avondhu	3-28 - 0-20	Carbery	Ballinlough Grounds
	S Condon 1-6 (0-1 f), C O’Brien 0-7 (0-2 f), J Murphy 2-0, L Keating 0-5, J Magner, P Walsh 0-3 each, L Cronin 0-2, D O’Reilly, S O’Callaghan 0-1 each.	Report	C O’Donovan 0-11 (0-7 f), P Collins, J Lucey, M Cahalane, C O’Sullivan 0-2 each, D Collins 0-1.	Referee: R Whelan (Gleann na Laoi)

10 June 2025 Round 1	Duhallow	2-19 - 1-23	Muskerry	Coachford Sportsfield
	F O’Connor 0-7 (0-6 f), R Lynn, L Philpott (0-1 f) 1-1 each, C King 0-3, E Murphy, B Murphy 0-2 each, C Crowley, C O’Keeffe, S Howard 0-1 each.	Report	M Bradley 0-13 (0-7 f), J Foley 1-2, J Lane, O O’Driscoll 0-2 each, M Lucey, D Twomey, D Casey, J Devine 0-1 each.	Referee: D Twomey (Shanballymore)

24 June 2025 Round 2	Avondhu	2-31 - 0-10	Duhallow	Ballyhooly Grounds
	S Condon 0-10 (0-2 f), L Óg Hegarty 2-2, C O’Brien 0-6 (0-1 f), E Carey 0-5, J Murphy, L Keating 0-2 each, J O’Sullivan, P Walsh, J Twomey, J Sheehan 0-1 each.	Report	F O’Connor 0-3 (0-2 f), N Linehan, S Howard, E Murphy, B Murphy, L Philpott (0-1 f), C Crowley, B O’Connor 0-1 each.

24 June 2025 Round 2	Muskerry	3-16 - 0-15	Carbery	Ovens Grounds
	M Bradley 1-7 (0-5 f), D Casey 2-1, S Tarrant 0-4, A Dinan 0-2, M O’Connell, J Foley 0-1 each.	Report	C O’Donovan 0-8 (0-7 f), L Hourihane, C Cronin, J Lucey, S Crowley, C Dullea, P Crowley, Donncha Collins 0-1 each.

- The last round of group games was cancelled as both matches were dead rubbers.

=== Division/colleges section semi-finals ===
- Imokilly and University College Cork received byes to this stage.

9 August 2025 Semi-final	Imokilly	2-32 - 1-17	Avondhu	Church Road
	J Leahy 0-9 (0-4 f), M Kelly 0-7 (0-1 65), D Healy 1-1, O Fitzgerald 1-0, B Lawton 0-3, S Hegarty, J Stack, W Leahy, C O’Callaghan, J Cronin 0-2 each, C Cahill, C Joyce 0-1 each.	Report	S Condon 0-8 (0-3 f), C O’Brien 0-5 (0-3 f), J Keating 1-2, B Lombard, E Carey 0-1 each.

10 August 2025 Semi-final	University College Cork	0-21 - 4-15	Muskerry	Páirc Tadhg Mac Cárthaigh
	A O’Sullivan 0-9 (0-8 f), M Mahony 0-5, E Coughlan 0-3, F Desmond 0-2, M Murphy, S Daly (0-1 each).	Report	M Bradley 1-9 (0-6 f), C O’Callaghan 1-4, J Lane 1-1, J Foley 1-0, S Tarrant 0-1.

=== Division/colleges section final ===
31 August 2025 Final	Imokilly	1-23 - 0-15	Muskerry	Páirc Uí Rinn
	J Leahy 1-8 (0-4 f), D Healy 0-4, M Kelly, B Lawton 0-3 each, C Cahill 0-2, L Duggan Murray, E Davis (f), W Leahy 0-1 each.	Report	M Bradley 0-6 (0-1 f), J Galvin, S O’Neill, J Lane 0-2 each, K Murphy, M O’Connell, P Ring 0-1 each.

== Relegation stage ==
=== Relegation playoff ===
21 September 2025 Playoff	Erin's Own	4-15 - 2-21	Newtownshandrum	Mourneabbey Grounds
	R O’Flynn (2-3, 1-2 frees); C Lenihan (1-4); F O’Brien (1-2); P O’Shea (0-4); B Óg Murphy, O O’Regan (0-1 each).	Report	J Coughlan (0-8, 7 frees); T O’Neill (1-4); C Griffin (1-1); C O’Brien (0-3); S Minihane (0-2); C Twomey, D O’Connor, M Lenihan (0-1 each).

26 September 2025 Playoff replay	Erin's Own	1-15 - 1-19	Newtownshandrum	Ballyhooly Sportsfield
	R O’Flynn 1-10 (1-4 f, 0-1 65), Conor Lenihan 0-2, O O’Regan, Cathal Lenihan, R Twomey 0-1 each.	Report	C O’Brien 1-3, C Griffin, J Coughlan (0-2 f) 0-4 each, T O’Mahony 0-2 (0-1 f), M Ryan, R Troy, T O’Neill, E O’Mahony, M Lenihan, J Lane 0-1 each.

== Knockout stage ==
=== Bracket ===
Quarter-Finals
Midleton (Imokilly)	2–19
Glen Rovers (Seandún)	2–17
Sarsfields (Imokilly)	0–22
Charleville (Avondhu)	1–15
Imokilly	1–12
St. Finbarr's (Seandún)	3–16

Semi-Finals
Blackrock (Seandún)	1–25
Midleton (Imokilly)	0–29
Sarsfields (Imokilly)	1–22
St. Finbarr's (Seandún)	2–18

Final
Midleton (Imokilly)	1–14
Sarsfields (Imokilly)	2–18

=== Quarter-finals ===
19 September 2025 Quarter-final	Midleton	2-19 - 2-17	Glen Rovers	Páirc Uí Rinn
	C Lehane 0-10 (0-8 f), C Beausang 2-1, K McDermott 0-3, R O’Regan, L O’Farrell 0-2 each, M Finn 0-1.	Report	P Horgan 2-9 (1-6 f), S Kennefick 0-3, M Mullins, E O’Leary 0-2 each, L Horgan 0-1.

21 September 2025 Quarter-final	Sarsfields	0-22 - 1-15	Charleville	Castletownroche Grounds
	C McCarthy 0-8 (0-6 f), J O’Connor 0-5, K Murphy, L Elliott, D Kearney, B O’Flynn 0-2 each, D Hogan 0-1.	Report	D Fitzgibbon 0-6 (0-1 f, 0-1 65), D Forde 0-4 (0-1 f), G Gleeson 1-0, J Doyle 0-2, D O’Flynn, T Hawe, C Buckley 0-1 each.

21 September 2025 Quarter-final	Imokilly	1-12 - 3-16	St Finbarr's	Clonmult Memorial Grounds
	S Harnedy (1-2); J Leahy (0-4, 0-2 frees, 0-2 65s); T Wilk, B Cooper (0-2 each); E Davis (free), D Healy (0-1 each).	Report	B Cunningham (0-7, 0-4 frees); J Cahalane (1-2, 0-1 free); J Wigginton-Barrett, B Hayes (1-1 each); W Buckley (0-2); D Cahalane, C Cahalane, J O’Kelly (0-1 each).

=== Semi-finals ===
5 October 2025 Semi-final	Blackrock	1-25 - 0-29 (aet)	Midleton	SuperValu Páirc Uí Chaoimh
	A Connolly (1-13, 0-10 frees, 0-1 ‘65), M O’Halloran and R Cotter (0-3 each), D O’Farrell, K O’Keeffe (free), P Linehan, F Coleman, G Connolly (’65) and Ciarán Cormack (0-1 each)	Report	C Lehane (0-12, 0-6 frees, 0-2 ‘65), P White (0-7), C Walsh, L O’Farrell and D Cremin (0-2 each), T O’Leary Hayes, M Finn and K McDermott (0-1 each)

5 October 2025 Semi-final	Sarsfields	1-22 - 2-18	St Finbarr's	SuperValu Páirc Uí Chaoimh
	C McCarthy 0-11 (0-7 f, 0-2 65), J O’Connor 0-4, C Darcy 0-3, B O’Flynn 1-0, J Sweeney 0-2, B Graham (penalty), D Kearney 0-1 each.	Report	B Cunningham 0-9 (0-7 f), W Buckley 1-2, B Hayes 1-1, J Cahalane 0-3, E Twomey, J Wigginton Barrett, S Cunningham 0-1 each.

=== Final ===
19 October 2025 Final	Midleton	1-14 - 2-18	Sarsfields	SuperValu Páirc Uí Chaoimh
	M Finn 0-7 (0-5 f, 0-1 65), E McGrath 1-0, K McDermott (0-1 65), C Beausang 0-2 each, B Saunderson (0-1 f), C Walsh, P White 0-1 each.	Report	C McCarthy 0-8 (0-7 f), J Sweeney 2-0, J O’Connor 0-5, D Hogan, K Murphy, B O’Flynn, S O’Regan, C Darcy 0-1 each.	Referee: C Lyons (Nemo Rangers)

== Championship statistics ==
=== Top scorers ===
Overall

Rank	Player	Club	Tally	Total	Matches	Average
1	Patrick Horgan	Glen Rovers	5-39	54	4	13.50
2	Ben Cunningham	St Finbarr's	2-46	52	5	10.40
3	Conor Lehane	Midleton	0-48	48	5	9.60
4	Colm McCarthy	Sarsfields	0-47	47	6	7.83
5	Robbie O'Flynn	Erin's Own	5-30	45	5	9.00
6	Matthew Bradley	Muskerry	2-35	41	4	10.25
7	Richard O'Sullivan	Newcestown	2-31	37	3	12.33
8	Darragh Fitzgibbon	Charleville	0-35	35	4	8.75
9	Alan Connolly	Blackrock	1-31	34	4	8.50
10	Declan Dalton	Fr O'Neill's	1-28	31	3	10.33

Single game

Rank	Player	Club	Tally	Total	Opposition
1	Patrick Horgan	Glen Rovers	2-10	16	Sarsfields
1	Richard O'Sullivan	Newcestown	2-10	16	Newtownshandrum
1	Alan Connolly	Blackrock	1-13	16	Midleton
4	Ben Cunningham	St Finbarr's	2-09	15	Blackrock
4	Patrick Horgan	Glen Rovers	2-09	15	Midleton
6	Robbie O'Flynn	Erin's Own	1-10	13	Newtownshandrum
6	Matthew Bradley	Muskerry	0-13	13	Duhallow
8	Matthew Bradley	Muskerry	1-09	12	UCC
8	Patrick Horgan	Glen Rovers	1-09	12	Fr O'Neill's
8	Declan Dalton	Fr O'Neill's	1-09	12	Erin's Own
8	Declan Dalton	Fr O'Neill's	0-12	12	Glen Rovers
8	Conor Lehane	Midleton	0-12	12	Blackrock
