= Ben Cunningham (hurler) =

Irish hurler (born 2003)

Personal information
- Nickname: Benny
- Born: 2003 (age 22–23) Cork, Ireland
- Occupation: Student

Sport
- Sport: Hurling
- Position: Left wing-forward
Club*
Years	Club	Apps (scores)
2021-present	St. Finbarr's	16 (4-150)
Club titles
- Cork titles: 1
College
Years	College	Apps (scores)
2022-present	UCC	4 (0-23)
College titles
- Fitzgibbon titles: 0
Inter-county**
Years	County	Apps (scores)
2022-present	Cork	0 (0-00)
Inter-county titles
- Munster titles: 0
- All-Irelands: 0
- NHL: 0
- All Stars: 0
- * club appearances and scores correct as of 22:18, 2 August 2024. **Inter County team apps and scores correct as of 22:45, 21 December 2022.

Ben Cunningham (born 2003) is an Irish hurler. At club level he plays with St. Finbarr's and is also a member of the Cork senior hurling team.

== Career ==
Cunningham began hurling at juvenile and underage levels with the St. Finbarr's club and was part of the club's minor team that won the Rebel Óg Premier 1 title in 2020. He was immediately drafted onto the club's senior team and established himself as their top scorer. Cunningham won a Cork PSHC title in 2022 after a defeat of Blackrock in the final.

Cunningham first appeared on the inter-county scene for Cork as a member of the minor team in 2020. He later progressed onto the Cork under-20 team and won an All-Ireland U20HC title after coming on as a substitute in the 4–19 to 2–14 defeat of Galway in the 2021 All-Ireland U20 final. Cunningham's club performances in 2022 earned a call-up to the Cork senior hurling team's pre-season training panel and he was included amongst the substitutes for the opening game of the 2023 Munster SHL. He earned a place on the starting fifteen for a subsequent National League game against Westmeath.

== Personal life ==
Cunningham was born in Cork and attended Presentation Brothers College. He belongs to a family of hurlers; his father is Ger Cunningham, the former St. Finbarr's and Cork goalkeeper.

== Career statistics ==
=== Club ===
As of 18 October 2026

Team	Year	Cork		Munster		All-Ireland		Total	
Team	Year	Apps	Score	Apps	Score	Apps	Score	Apps	Score
St Finbarr's	2021	3	1-23	—		—		3	1-23
St Finbarr's	2022	6	2-50	1	0-09	—		7	2-59
St Finbarr's	2023	5	1-58	—		—		5	1-58
St Finbarr's	2024	3	0-24	—		—		3	0-24
St Finbarr's	2025	5	2-46	—		—		5	2-46
St Finbarr's	2026	6	2-38	—		—		6	2-38
Total		28	8-239	1	0-09	—		29	8-248

=== Inter-county ===
As of 7 July 2024.

Team	Year	National League			Munster		All-Ireland		Total	
Team	Year	Division	Apps	Score	Apps	Score	Apps	Score	Apps	Score
Cork	2023	Division 1A	1	0-01	0	0-00	0	0-00	1	0-01
Cork	2024	Division 1A	0	0-00	0	0-00	0	0-00	0	0-00
Career total			1	0-01	0	0-00	0	0-00	1	0-01

== Honours ==
St. Finbarr's

- Cork Premier Senior Hurling Championship: 2022
- Rebel Óg Premier 1 Minor Hurling Championship: 2020

Cork

- All-Ireland Under-20 Hurling Championship: 2021, 2023
- Munster Under-20 Hurling Championship: 2021, 2023
