= Conor Lehane =

Irish hurler (born 1992)

Personal information
- Born: 30 July 1992 (age 34) Midleton, County Cork, Ireland
- Occupation: Sales Rep
- Height: 5 ft 11 in (180 cm)

Sport
- Sport: Hurling
- Position: Centre-forward
Club*
Years	Club	Apps (scores)
2009-present	Midleton	57 (21-397)
Club titles
- Cork titles: 2
College
- Years: College
- 2011-2015: University College Cork
College titles
- Fitzgibbon titles: 1
Inter-county**
Years	County	Apps (scores)
2011-2020; 2021-	Cork	60 (5-131)
Inter-county titles
- Munster titles: 4
- All-Irelands: 0
- NHL: 1
- All Stars: 0
- * club appearances and scores correct as of 22:07, 20 October 2023. **Inter County team apps and scores correct as of match played 20 July 2025.

Conor Lehane (born 30 July 1992) is an Irish hurler who currently plays as a centre-forward for the Cork senior team.

Born in Midleton, County Cork, Lehane first played competitive hurling at Midleton CBS Secondary School. Here he won Rice Cup and Cork Colleges medals before later featuring on the Harty Cup team. As a student at University College Cork, Lehane won a Fitzgibbon Cup medal in 2013.

Lehane first appeared for the Midleton club at underage levels, winning a county minor championship medal in 2010 before claiming county under-21 championship medals in 2011 and 2013. As a member of the Midleton senior team he also won a county senior championship medal in 2013.

Having played for Cork at under-15 and under-17 levels, Lehane was just sixteen when he was selected for the Cork minor team. He played for two championship seasons with the minor team. Lehane subsequently enjoyed a three-year stint with the Cork under-21 team. By this stage he had also joined the Cork senior team, making his debut during the 2011 Waterford Crystal Cup. Since then Lehane has become a regular member of the starting fifteen. An All-Ireland runner-up in 2013, he won Munster medals in 2014, 2017, 2018 and 2025

At international level Lehane won championship honours as a member of the composite rules shinty–hurling team in 2014.

== Playing career ==
=== University College Cork ===
During his tenure at University College Cork, Lehane played a key role for the university's various hurling teams.

In 2012 he was at full-forward when UCC faced fierce local rivals Cork Institute of Technology in the final of the All-Ireland Freshers Championship. Lehane chipped in with 0–6 to secure a 1–24 to 3-13 extra time victory.

He progressed onto the UCC senior team during the 2012-13 college year, and lined out in the final of the Fitzgibbon Cup. Mary Immaculate College were the surprise opponents, however, tradition prevailed and UCC retained their title with a 2–17 to 2–12 victory.with Lehane giving a Man of the Match performance. It was Lehane's first Fitzgibbon Cup medal.

=== Midleton ===
Lehane plays his club hurling with Midleton and has enjoyed some success at underage levels.

In 2010 Lehane won a county minor championship with the club, following a 1–15 to 0–12 defeat of Na Piarsaigh.

Lehane had joined the club's under-21 team by 2011, and won a divisional under-21 championship. Midleton later secured the county under-21 championship, following a 1–11 to 0–8 defeat of Duhallow.

In 2013 Lehane completed his collection of county medals as he helped Midletion win a first senior county title since 1991 after victory over Sarsfield's with a Man of the Match display, scoring 2.10. He also won another county under-21 championship as captain, defeating Blackrock.

=== Cork ===
==== Minor and under-21 ====
Lehane first came to prominence on the inter-county scene as a member of the Cork minor hurling team. He enjoyed little success in this grade before subsequently moving onto the county's under-21 side.

==== Senior ====
Lehane was just 18-years-old when he was added to the Cork senior hurling team. He made his first appearance at left wing-forward on 23 January 2011 and scored six points in the 3–17 to 1–22 defeat of University College Cork in the Waterford Crystal Cup. On 17 April, he made his first appearance in the National Hurling League when he came on as a 50th-minute substitute for Cian McCarthy in a 1–15 to 1–14 defeat of Dublin. A knee injury and the completion of the Leaving Certificate ruled him out of further action, however, he made his championship debut on 9 July in a 2–23 to 1-14 All-Ireland Qualifier defeat by Galway.

On 6 May 2012, Lehane lined out in the National League final. He was held scoreless at right wing-forward in the 3–21 to 0–16 defeat by Kilkenny.

Lehane lined out in his first Munster Championship final on 14 July 2013. He was substituted in the 41st minute and Cork eventually lost the game by 0–24 to 0–15. On 8 September, Lehane lined out at left corner-forward against Clare in the All-Ireland final. He scored 1–01 in the 3–16 to 0–25 draw. Lehane was again at left corner-forward for the replay on 28 September and scored two points in the 5–16 to 3–16 defeat. He ended the season by being nominated for an All-Star.

On 3 July 2014, Lehane won a Munster Championship medal after scoring five points in Cork's 2–24 to 0–24 defeat of Limerick in the last final to be played at the old Páirc Uí Chaoimh. He ended the season by being nominated for an All-Star.

On 3 May 2015, Lehane was at full-forward in Cork's 1–24 to 0–17 defeat by Waterford in the National League final.

Lehane won his second Munster Championship medal on 9 July 2017 in the 1–25 to 1–20 defeat of Clare in the final. He ended the season by being nominated for an All-Star.

On 1 July 2018, Lehane won a third Munster Championship medal following a 2–24 to 3–19 defeat of Clare in the final.

On 7 December 2020, it was reported in the Irish Examiner that Lehane would not be involved with the Cork senior hurling team for the 2021 season.

== Personal life ==
Lehane grew up in Midleton and was educated at Midleton CBS Secondary School in the town. It was here that he first came to prominence as a hurler, representing the school in the Dr. Harty Cup. He is currently a student in University College Cork.

== Career statistics ==
=== Club ===
As of 4 October 2026.

Team	Season	Cork		Munster		All-Ireland		Total	
Team	Season	Apps	Score	Apps	Score	Apps	Score	Apps	Score
Midleton	2009	4	2-06	—		—		4	2-06
Midleton	2010	4	1-15	—		—		4	1-15
Midleton	2011	3	1-10	—		—		3	1-10
Midleton	2012	3	1-09	—		—		3	1-09
Midleton	2013	5	5-48	1	1-05	—		6	6-53
Midleton	2014	3	0-29	—		—		3	0-29
Midleton	2015	2	0-16	—		—		2	0-16
Midleton	2016	5	2-21	—		—		5	2-21
Midleton	2017	2	0-16	—		—		2	0-16
Midleton	2018	4	2-30	1	1-04	—		5	3-34
Midleton	2019	3	2-34	—		—		3	2-34
Midleton	2020	3	3-30	—		—		3	3-30
Midleton	2021	6	0-55	1	0-06	—		7	0-61
Midleton	2022	3	0-34	—		—		3	0-34
Midleton	2023	4	0-29	—		—		4	0-29
Midleton	2024	5	1-55	—		—		5	1-55
Midleton	2025	5	0-48	—		—		5	0-48
Midleton	2026	4	0-29	—		—		4	0-29
Total		68	20-514	3	2-15	—		71	22-529

=== Inter-county ===
As of match played 20 July 2025 (championship only)

Team	Year	National League			Munster		All-Ireland		Total	
Team	Year	Division	Apps	Score	Apps	Score	Apps	Score	Apps	Score
Cork	2011	Division 1	0	0-00	0	0-00	1	0-00	1	0-00
Cork	2012	Division 1A	7	1-20	1	0-02	3	0-05	11	1-27
Cork	2013	Division 1A	6	1-07	2	0-02	4	1-08	12	2-17
Cork	2014	Division 1B	5	1-13	4	0-12	1	0-04	10	1-29
Cork	2015	Division 1A	8	2-22	1	0-01	3	1-11	12	3-34
Cork	2016	Division 1A	6	0-23	1	0-02	2	0-06	9	0-31
Cork	2017	Division 1A	4	0-20	3	0-15	1	0-02	8	0-37
Cork	2018	Division 1A	5	1-18	5	1-11	1	1-03	11	3-32
Cork	2019	Division 1A	6	1-14	4	0-05	2	0-04	12	1-23
Cork	2020	Division 1A	5	1-03	1	0-02	2	0-00	8	1-05
Cork	2021	Division 1A	—		—		—		—	
Cork	2022	Division 1A	7	1-19	4	0-16	2	1-10	12	2-45
Cork	2023	Division 1A	4	2-07	4	0-03	0	0-00	8	2-10
Cork	2024	Division 1A	5	0-09	2	0-03	2	0-01	9	0-13
Cork	2025	Division 1A			2	0-02	2	0-01	4	0-03
Career total			68	11-175	34	1-76	26	4-55	125	16-306

== Honours ==
Midleton CBS Secondary School

- Rice Cup (1): 2006

University College Cork

- Fitzgibbon Cup (1): 2013
- All-Ireland Freshers Championship (1): 2012 (c)

Midleton

- Cork Senior Hurling Championship (2): 2013, 2021 (c)
- Cork Under-21 Hurling Championship (2): 2011, 2013 (c)
- East Cork Under-21 A Hurling Championship (2): 2011, 2013 (c)
- Cork Premier Minor Hurling Championship (1): 2010 (c)

Cork

- Munster Senior Hurling Championship (4): 2014, 2017, 2018, 2025
- National Hurling League: 2025
- Munster Senior Hurling League (1): 2017

Ireland

- Shinty/Hurling International Series (1): 2014

Sporting positions
Preceded by William Egan	Cork Under-21 Hurling Captain; 2012	Succeeded by Christopher Joyce
