= 2024 Cork Premier Senior Hurling Championship =

Annual hurling competition season

- Dates: 4 June - 20 October 2024
- Teams: 12 clubs 5 divisions 1 university
- Sponsor: Co-Op Superstores
- Champions: Imokilly (6th title); Ciarán O'Brien (captain); Denis Ring (manager)
- Runners-up: Sarsfields; Conor O'Sullivan (captain); Johnny Crowley (manager)
- Relegated: Bishopstown

Tournament statistics
- Matches played: 30
- Goals scored: 90 (3 per match)
- Points scored: 1110 (37 per match)
- Top scorer(s): Conor Lehane (1-55)

The 2024 Cork Premier Senior Hurling Championship was the fifth staging of the Cork Premier Senior Hurling Championship and the 136th staging overall of a championship for the top-ranking hurling teams in Cork. The draw for the group stage placings took place on 14 December 2023. The championship ran from 4 June to 20 October 2024.

Sarsfields were the defending champions

The final was played on 20 October 2024 at SuperValu Páirc Uí Chaoimh in Cork, between Imokilly and Sarsfields, in what was their second meeting in the final overall and a first final meeting in since the 1997 final. Imokilly won the match by 1–23 to 0–17 to claim their sixth championship title overall and a first title in five years.

Midleton's Conor Lehane was the championship's top scorer with 1-55.

== Team changes ==
=== To Championship ===
Promoted from the Cork Senior A Hurling Championship

- Newcestown

=== From Championship ===
Relegated to the Cork Senior A Hurling Championship

- Glen Rovers

== Participating teams ==
=== Clubs ===
| Team | Location | Colours | Manager(s) | Captain(s) |
|---|---|---|---|---|
| Bishopstown | Bishopstown | Maroon and white | Martin Hayes | Brian Murray |
| Blackrock | Blackrock | Green and yellow | Jamie Harrington | Cathal Cormack |
| Charleville | Charleville | Red and white | Seoirse Bulfin | Jack Buckley |
| Douglas | Douglas | Green, white and black | Gearóid Reddington | Alan Cadogan |
| Erin's Own | Glounthaune | Blue and red | Martin Buckley | James O'Carroll |
| Fr. O'Neill's | Ballymacoda | Green and red | Dave Colbert; Bryan Sweeney | Eoin Motherway |
| Kanturk | Kanturk | White and green | Tom Walsh | Ryan Walsh; Lorcán McLoughlin |
| Midleton | Midleton | Black and white | Micheál Keohane | Conor Lehane |
| Newcestown | Newcestown | Red and yellow | Charlie Wilson | Eoghan Collins |
| Newtownshandrum | Newtownshandrum | Green and yellow | Gerdi O’Mahony; Alan G. O’Brien | Tim O'Mahony |
| Sarsfields | Glanmire | Blue, black and white | Johnny Crowley | Conor O'Sullivan |
| St. Finbarr's | Togher | Blue and yellow | Ger Cunningham | Damien Cahalane |

=== Divisions and colleges ===
| Team | Location | Colours | Manager | Captain |
|---|---|---|---|---|
| Avondhu | North Cork | Black and yellow | | |
| Carbery | West Cork | Purple and yellow | Joe Ryan | Gearóid O'Donovan |
| Duhallow | Duhallow | Orange and black | Donal O’Mahoney | Conor O’Callaghan |
| Imokilly | East Cork | Red and white | Denis Ring | Ciarán O'Brien |
| Muskerry | Mid Cork | Green and white | Diarmuid Kirwan | Eoin O'Shea |
| University College Cork | College Road | Red and black | | |

== Group A ==
=== Group A table ===
Semi-finalists Quarter-finalists Relegation playoff

| Team | Matches | | | | Score | | | Pts |
| Team | Pld | W | D | L | For | Against | Diff | Pts |
|---|---|---|---|---|---|---|---|---|
| Sarsfields | 3 | 3 | 0 | 0 | 88 | 49 | 39 | 6 |
| Newtownshandrum | 3 | 2 | 0 | 1 | 75 | 53 | 22 | 4 |
| Douglas | 3 | 1 | 0 | 2 | 55 | 77 | -12 | 2 |
| Bishopstown | 3 | 0 | 0 | 3 | 31 | 80 | -49 | 0 |

=== Group A results ===
| 3 August 2024 Round 1 | Bishopstown | 0-08 - 5-13 | Newtownshandrum | Páirc Mac Gearailt |
| | C O’Hora, D O’Donovan 0-2 each, T Murray (65), C O’Driscoll, D Murray, D Daly 0-1 each. | Report | J Coughlan 2-6 (0-5 f), T O’Mahony (0-2 f), R Geary 1-2 each, C Griffin 1-0, C O’Brien, K O’Sullivan, C Twomey 0-1 each. | Referee: M Maher (St Finbarr's) |

| 3 August 2024 Round 1 | Douglas | 0-12 - 1-31 | Sarsfields | Páirc Uí Rinn |
| | A Cadogan 0-6 (0-4f, 0-1 65), S Kingston 0-3 (0-1f, 0-1 65), M O’Connor, S Bourke, C Baldwin 0-1 each. | Report | D Hogan 0-10 (0-5f, 0-2 65), J O’Connor 0-7, S O’Regan 1-5, D Kearney, J Sweeney, B Murphy 0-2 each, P Leopold, C Darcy, C McCarthy 0-1 each. | Referee: C O'Regan (Ballyhea) |

| 23 August 2024 Round 2 | Douglas | 1-21 - 0-10 | Bishopstown | Páirc Uí Rinn |
| | S Kingston (0-9, 0-4 frees), A Cadogan (1-5, 0-3 frees, 0-1 ’65), A O’Connell (0-3), M Howell, J Harte, M O’Connor and C Kingston (0-1 each). | Report | T Murray (0-5, 0-3 frees), B Murray (0-2, 0-1 free), C Dunne (’65), D Murray and B O’Driscoll (0-1 each). |

| 25 August 2034 Round 2 | Newtownshandrum | 3-15 - 1-23 | Sarsfields | Mourneabbey Grounds |
| | J Coughlan (0-7, 0-3 65s, 0-2 frees); R Geary (2-0); E O’Mahony (1-1); T O’Mahony (0-4, 0-1 free); P O’Sullivan, M Ryan, C Griffin (0-1 each). | Report | D Hogan (0-13, 0-6 frees); S O’Regan (1-1); J O’Connor (0-4); C McCarthy (0-2); C Darcy, J Sweeney, B Murphy (0-1 each). |

| 8 September 2024 Round 3 | Douglas | 0-19 - 2-17 | Newtownshandrum | Mourneabbey Grounds |
| | S Kingston (0-8, 0-5 frees), A Cadogan (0-5, 0-3 frees, 0-1 65), K McSweeney, E Cadogan, J Harte, M Howell, D Harte and A O’Connell (0-1 each). | Report | J Coughlan (0-8, 0-4 frees, 0-2 65s). C Griffin (1-2), R Geary (1-1), T O’Mahony (0-2), M Ryan, D O’Connor, C O’Brien and J Twomey (0-1 each). |

| 8 September 2024 Round 3 | Sarsfields | 1-25 - 0-13 | Bishopstown | Páirc Bhríde |
| | D Hogan 0-8 (3f); Cathal McCarthy 1-0, J O’Connor 0-3, L Elliot 0-3, S O’Regan 0-2, B Murphy 0-2, J O’Leary 0-2, A Myers 0-2, C O’Sullivan 0-1, D Kearney 0-1, Colm McCarthy 0-1. | Report | T Murray 0-5 (4f); B Murray 0-2 (1f), M Driscoll 0-2 (2f), D Quaid 0-1, G Murphy 0-1, C O’Driscoll 0-1. |

== Group B ==
=== Group B table ===
Quarter-finalists

| Team | Matches | | | | Score | | | Pts |
| Team | Pld | W | D | L | For | Against | Diff | Pts |
|---|---|---|---|---|---|---|---|---|
| Blackrock | 3 | 3 | 0 | 0 | 77 | 66 | 11 | 6 |
| Fr O'Neill's | 3 | 2 | 0 | 1 | 60 | 61 | -1 | 4 |
| St Finbarr's | 3 | 1 | 0 | 2 | 64 | 62 | 2 | 2 |
| Newcestown | 3 | 0 | 0 | 3 | 60 | 72 | -12 | 0 |

=== Group B results ===
| 2 August 2024 Round 1 | St Finbarr's | 2-17 - 3-15 | Blackrock | Páirc Uí Rinn |
| | B Cunningham 0-10 (0-9f), B Hayes 1-1, S Cunningham 1-0, E Twomey 0-2, P Buggy, C Crowley, J Cahalane, W Buckley 0-1 each. | Report | R Cotter 2-2, A Connolly 1-5 (0-2f, 0-2 65), N Cashman 0-2, A O’Callaghan, K O’Keeffe, D Meaney, P Linehan, F Coleman, D O’Farrell 0-1 each. | Referee: C McAllister (Aghada) |

| 4 August 2024 Round 1 | Newcestown | 2-13 - 1-17 | Fr O'Neill's | Carrigaline Grounds |
| | S O’Donovan, J Meade 1-1 each, E Kenneally 0-3f, D Buckley, T Twomey, C O’Donovan 0-2 each, C Dinneen, R O’Sullivan (0-1f) 0-1 each. | Report | D Dalton 1-9 (1-4 f, 0-1 sideline), C Broderick 0-3, K O’Sullivan, J Hankard, Joe Millerick, M Wall, John Millerick 0-1 each. | Referee: S Stokes (Tullylease) |

| 24 August 2024 Round 2 | Fr O'Neill's | 0-18 - 0-15 | St Finbarr's | Clonmult Memorial Park |
| | D Dalton (0-11, 0-9 frees, 0-1 sideline); K O’Sullivan, B Dunne (0-2 each); P McMahon, J Millerick, J Hankard (0-1 each). | Report | B Cunningham (0-8, 0-5 frees); W Buckley (0-4); J Cahalane (0-3, 0-1 free). |

| 25 August 2024 Round 2 | Blackrock | 3-17 - 0-21 | Newcestown | Coachford Sportsfield |
| | A Connolly 1-5 (0-3 f), R Cotter 1-2, F Coleman 0-4, S O'Keeffe 1-0, N Cashman, P Linehan 0-2 each, A O’Callaghan, K O’Keeffe 0-1 each. | Report | J Meade 0-5 f, Ciaran O’Donovan (f), C Dinneen, L Meade 0-4 each, N Kelly 0-2, S O’Donovan, Colm O’Donovan 0-1 each. |

| 8 September 2024 Round 3 | Blackrock | 3-18 - 1-19 | Fr O'Neill's | Páirc Séamus de Barra |
| | A Connolly 1-7 (0-3 f, 0-2 65), F Coleman, Ciarán Cormack 1-3 each, K O’Keeffe, D O’Farrell 0-2 each, P Linehan 0-1. | Report | D Dalton 1-10 (0-4 f, 0-1 65), P McMahon 0-4, Joe Millerick 0-3 (0-1 f), B Dunne 0-1. |

| 8 September 2024 Round 3 | St Finbarr's | 3-17 - 0-20 | Newcestown | Cloughduv Grounds |
| | W Buckley 2-1, B Cunningham 0-6 (0-2 f), J Cahalane 0-5, E Twomey 1-1, B Hayes 0-2, A Casey, E Finn 0-1 each. | Report | R O'Sullivan 0-10 f, C Dinneen 0-4, Colm O’Donovan, D Buckley 0-2 each, S O’Donovan, N Kelly 0-1 each. |

== Group C ==
=== Group C table ===
Quarter-finalists Relegation playoff

| Team | Matches | | | | Score | | | Pts |
| Team | Pld | W | D | L | For | Against | Diff | Pts |
|---|---|---|---|---|---|---|---|---|
| Midleton | 3 | 2 | 1 | 0 | 80 | 68 | 12 | 5 |
| Kanturk | 3 | 2 | 1 | 0 | 77 | 71 | 6 | 5 |
| Erin's Own | 3 | 1 | 0 | 2 | 62 | 64 | -2 | 2 |
| Charleville | 3 | 0 | 0 | 3 | 74 | 90 | -16 | 0 |

=== Group C results ===
| 2 August 2024 Round 1 | Erin's Own | 1-14 - 1-18 | Kanturk | Mallow GAA Complex |
| | E Murphy 0-5 (0-4 f), C Lenihan 1-1, M O’Riordan 0-3 (0-1 f), J Sheehan 0-2, P O’Shea, R O’Flynn (f), J O’Carroll 0-1 each. | Report | B O’Sullivan 0-7 (0-6 f), Alan Walsh 1-3, Aidan Walsh, C Walsh, L O’Neill 0-2 each, D O’Connell, R Sheahan 0-1 each. | Referee: A Hyland (Kilworth) |

| 3 August 2024 Round 1 | Midleton | 2-27 - 2-18 | Charleville | Mourneabbey Grounds |
| | C Lehane 1-8 (0-3 f, 0-1 65), D Cremin 0-5, P Connaughton 1-1, B Saunderson 0-3 (0-2 f), T O’Connell, M Finn, C Beausang 0-2 each, S O’Meara, A Quirke, E Moloney, P White, L O’Farrell 0-1 each. | Report | J Doyle 0-9 (0-8 f), T Hawe 2-3, D Fitzgibbon 0-3 (0-2 f), O O’Connell, A Cagney, C Buckley 0-1 each. | Referee: W King (Banteer) |

| 25 August 2024 Round 2 | Charleville | 1-17 - 1-22 | Erin's Own | Mallow GAA Complex |
| | A Cagney (1-4), D Fitzgibbon (0-4 (0-2 frees, 0-1 65), J Doyle (0-3), C Buckley (0-2), D O’Flynn, R Carroll, O O’Connell and D Forde (0-1 each). | Report | S Irwin (0-6), J O’Carroll (1-1), R O’Flynn and T Foley (0-3 each), B Óg Murphy (frees), M O’Riordan (frees), E Murphy (frees) and C Lenihan (0-2 each), S Bowen (0-1 free). |

| 31 August 2024 Round 2 | Midleton | 1-21 - 1-21 | Kanturk | Castletownroche Grounds |
| | C Lehane 0-10 (0-7 f), A Quirke 1-0, E Moloney, C Beausang, L O’Farrell 0-2 each, S O’Meara, T O’Connell, M Finn, R O’Regan, P White 0-1 each. | Report | B O’Sullivan 0-12 (0-10 f, 0-1 65), Alan Walsh 1-2, Aidan Walsh 0-2, L McLoughlin, P Walsh, D O’Connell, I Walsh, L O’Keeffe 0-1 each. |

| 8 September 2024 Round 3 | Midleton | 0-23 - 1-17 | Erin's Own | Páirc Uí Rinn |
| | C Lehane 0-14 (0-8 f, 0-1 65), M Finn, L O’Farrell 0-3 each, C Beausang, P White, A Quirke, 0-1 each. | Report | R O’Flynn 0-9 (0-5 f), M O’Carroll 1-2, C Lenihan, P O’Shea 0-2 each, B Óg Murphy, J O’Carroll 0-1 each. |

| 8 September 2024 Round 3 | Charleville | 3-21 - 4-20 | Kanturk | Fr Con Buckley Park |
| | D Fitzgibbon (0-10, 6fs); T Hawe (2-2); C Buckley (0-5); D Forde (1-0); O O’Connell, D Casey, J O’Brien, D O’Riordan (0-1 each). | Report | Alan Walsh (3-3); B O’Sullivan (0-6, 4fs); R Sheehan (1-1); L O’Neill (0-4); Aidan Walsh (0-3), I Walsh (0-2); T Walsh (0-1). |

== Division/colleges section ==
=== Division/colleges section group stage ===
Division/colleges section semi-finals

| Team | Matches | | | | Score | | | Pts |
| Team | Pld | W | D | L | For | Against | Diff | Pts |
|---|---|---|---|---|---|---|---|---|
| Muskerry | 1 | 1 | 0 | 0 | 24 | 15 | 9 | 2 |
| Carbery | 2 | 1 | 0 | 1 | 44 | 38 | 6 | 2 |
| Duhallow | 1 | 0 | 0 | 1 | 14 | 29 | -15 | 0 |

=== Division/colleges section group stage results ===
| 4 June 2024 Round 1 | Carbery | 2-09 - 3-15 | Muskerry | Castle Grounds |
| | M Hickey 1-4 (0-2f, 0-1 65), C Cullinane 1-0, B O’Donovan 0-2, J Lucey, J O’Donovan, B Deasy 0-1 each. | Report | E O’Shea 1-6 (0-2f, 0-1 65), C O’Driscoll 1-3, T O’Connell 1-1, S Joyce, A Dinan 0-2 each, P O’Sullivan 0-1. | Referee: A Hyland (Kilworth) |

| 11 June 2024 Round 2 | Duhallow | 0-14 - 3-20 | Carbery | Coachford Sportsfield |
| | L Philpott 0-5 (0-4f), J O’Callaghan 0-3, R King, B Murphy 0-2 each, H O’Connor, E Murphy 0-1 each. | Report | B O’Donovan 2-7 (0-4f), C Cullinane 1-3, E Ferguson 0-5 G O’Donovan 0-3, J Lucey 0-2. | Referee: B Barry-Murphy (Aghabullogue) |

| 25 June 2024 Round 3 | Muskerry | w/o - scr. | Duhallow | Ballyanly Grounds |

=== Division/colleges section semi-finals ===
- Avondhu, Imokilly and University College Cork received byes to this stage.

| 11 August 2024 Semifinal | Muskerry | 3-18 - 2-15 | University College Cork | Jamesy Kelleher Park |
| | M Bradley 2-1, J Dwyer 0-5, E O’Shea 0-4 (0-2f), D Kirwan 0-3, A Murphy 1-0, S Joyce 0-2, T O’Connell, S Tarrant, M Lucey 0-1 each. | Report | M O’Dwyer 2-0 (1-0 penalty), E Stokes 0-5 (0-1f), B Keating 0-3 (0-1f), C Grainger 0-2, P Hynes (0-1f), E Cullinane, D Desmond, D Healy, K O’Reilly 0-1 each. |

| 11 August 2024 Semi-final | Imokilly | 5-24 - 0-12 | Avondhu | Páirc Mac Gearailt |
| | J Leahy 0-11 (0-5 f), M Kelly 2-2, A Murphy 1-3, S Desmond 1-1, D O’Brien 1-0, D O’Leary, S Hegarty 0-2 each, K O’Neill, L O’Shea, W Leahy 0-1 each. | Report | S Condon 0-5 (0-3 f), M Lenahan 0-3, C O’Brien 0-2 (0-1 f), S Killeen, D Flynn 0-1 each. |

=== Division/colleges section final ===
| 1 September 2024 Final | Muskerry | 0-17 - 6-31 | Imokilly | Páirc Uí Rinn |
| | M Bradley 0-10 (0-7 f, 0-2 65), O O’Driscoll, S O’Neill 0-2 each, D O’Sullivan, C O’Leary, B Corcoran 0-1 each. | Report | J Leahy 2-7 (0-5 f), S Desmond 1-4, M Kelly 0-4, B Lehane, W Leahy (0-1 sl), D O’Leary 1-1 each, S Harnedy, D Healy 0-3, C Joyce 0-2, L O’Shea, A Murphy, B Lawton, J Cronin, T Wilk 0-1 each. |

== Knockout stage ==
=== Bracket ===
Quarter-Finals
Midleton | 2-20
Newtownshandrum | 1-15
Blackrock | 3-16
Kanturk | 0-17
Fr O'Neill's | 2-14
Imokilly | 0-27

Semi-Finals
Sarsfields | 0-22
Midleton | 0-21
Blackrock | 1-20
Imokilly | 1-29

Final
Sarsfields | 0-17
Imokilly | 1-23

=== Relegation playoff ===
| 21 September 2024 Playoff | Bishopstown | 2-18 - 3-24 | Charleville | Grenagh Grounds |
| | T Murray (0-9, 0-8 frees, 0-1 ’65), M Driscoll (1-2, 0-2 frees), C O’Driscoll (1-2), C Murray and D Murray (0-2 each), D O’Donovan (0-1). | Report | T Hawe (3-2), D Fitzgibbon (0-7, 0-5 frees), J Doyle (0-4), D O’Flynn, C Buckley, A Cagney and D Forde (0-2 each), O O’Connell, J O’Brien and G Kelleher (0-1each). |

=== Quarter-finals ===
| 20 September 2024 Quarter-final | Midleton | 2-20 - 1-15 | Newtownshandrum | Páirc Uí Rinn |
| | C Lehane 0-10 (0-4 f 0-2 65), L O’Farrell 1-4, D Cremin 0-3, P White 1-0, A Mulcahy, R O’Regan, E Moloney 0-1 each. | Report | J Coughlan 1-4 (0-3 f 0-1 65), J Twomey 0-3, R Troy, R Geary (f) 0-2 each, E O’Mahony, C Griffin, B Collins, J Geary 0-1 each. |

| 21 September 2024 Quarter-final | Blackrock | 3-16 - 0-17 | Kanturk | Páirc Mac Gearailt |
| | A Connolly 1-6 (0-3 f), F Coleman, T Deasy 1-0 each, K O’Keeffe, G Connolly (0-2 f), D Meaney 0-2 each, Ciarán Cormack, M O’Keeffe, R Sweeney, R Cotter 0-1 each. | Report | B O’Sullivan 0-5f, Aidan Walsh 0-4, Alan Walsh, C Walsh 0-2 each, L McLoughlin, R Walsh, L O’Neill, R Sheahan 0-1 each. |

| 22 September 2024 Quarter-final | Fr O'Neill's | 2-14 - 0-27 | Imokilly | Clonmult Memorial Park |
| | D Dalton 1-12 (1-0 penalty, 0-10 f, 0-1 sl), B Dunne 1-0, John Millerick, C Broderick 0-1 each. | Report | J Leahy 0-8 (0-6 f, 0-1 65), D Healy 0-4, A Murphy, S Desmond 0-3 each, S Hegarty, D O’Leary, S Harnedy, 0-2 each, D O’Brien, M Kelly (0-1 f), K O’Neill 0-1 each. |

=== Semi-finals ===
| 6 October 2024 Semi-final | Blackrock | 1-20 - 1-29 | Imokilly | SuperValu Páirc Uí Chaoimh |
| | A Connolly 1-9 (0-7 f, 1-0 pen), R Cotter 0-4, R Sweeney 0-2, P Lenihan, K O’Keeffe, G Connolly (f), T Deasy, Ciarán Cormack 0-1 each. | Report | J Leahy 1-8 (0-4 f), B Lawton 0-5, S Harnedy 0-4, D O’Leary, D Healy, E Davis (2 f) 0-2 each, S Desmond, S Hegarty, A Murphy, B Cooper, M Kelly, D O’Brien 0-1 each. |

| 6 October 2024 Semi-final | Sarsfields | 0-22 - 0-21 | Midleton | SuperValu Páirc Uí Chaoimh |
| | D Hogan 0-8 (0-6 f, 0-1 65), L Elliott, A Myers 0-3 each, D Kearney, J Sweeney 0-2 each, C Darcy, S O’Regan, J O’Connor, B Murphy 0-1 each. | Report | C Lehane 0-13 (0-7 f, 0-2 65), R O’Regan 0-2, A Quirke, E Moloney, L O’Farrell, P White, D Cremin, C Beausang 0-1 each. |

=== Final ===
| 20 October 2024 Final | Imokilly | 1-23 - 0-17 | Sarsfields | SuperValu Páirc Uí Chaoimh |
| | J Leahy 0-11 (0-7 f, 0-1 65), S Hegarty, S Desmond 0-3 each, A Murphy 1-0, S Harnedy 0-2, D Healy, M Kelly, Barry Lawton, E Davis (f) 0-1 each. | Report | D Hogan 0-5 (0-2 f), J O’Connor 0-3, A Myers 0-2, P Leopold, B Murphy, C O’Sullivan, Cathal McCarthy, D Kearney, C Darcy, Colm McCarthy 0-1 | Referee: S Scanlon (Newcestown) |

== Championship statistics ==
=== Top scorers ===
Overall

| Rank | Player | Club | Tally | Total | Matches | Average |
|---|---|---|---|---|---|---|
| 1 | Conor Lehane | Midleton | 1-55 | 58 | 5 | 11.60 |
| 2 | Jack Leahy | Imokilly | 3-45 | 54 | 5 | 10.80 |
| 3 | Declan Dalton | Fr O'Neill's | 3-42 | 51 | 4 | 12.75 |
| 4 | Alan Connolly | Blackrock | 5-32 | 47 | 5 | 9.40 |
| 5 | Daniel Hogan | Sarsfields | 0-44 | 44 | 5 | 8.80 |
| 6 | Jamie Coughlan | Newtownshandrum | 3-25 | 34 | 4 | 8.50 |
| 7 | Brian O'Sullivan | Kanturk | 0-30 | 30 | 4 | 7.50 |
| 8 | Tim Hawe | Charleville | 7-07 | 28 | 4 | 7.00 |
| 9 | Alan Walsh | Kanturk | 5-10 | 25 | 4 | 6.25 |
| 10 | Ben Cunningham | St Finbarr's | 0-24 | 24 | 3 | 8.00 |
| 10 | Darragh Fitzgibbon | Charleville | 0-24 | 24 | 4 | 6.00 |

Single game

| Rank | Player | Club | Tally | Total | Opposition |
|---|---|---|---|---|---|
| 1 | Declan Dalton | Fr O'Neill's | 1-12 | 15 | Imokilly |
| 2 | Conor Lehane | Midleton | 0-14 | 14 | Erin's Own |
| 3 | Brian O'Donovan | Carbery | 2-07 | 13 | Duhallow |
| 3 | Jack Leahy | Imokilly | 2-07 | 13 | Muskerry |
| 3 | Declan Dalton | Fr O'Neill's | 1-10 | 13 | Blackrock |
| 3 | Conor Lehane | Midleton | 0-13 | 13 | Sarsfields |
| 3 | Daniel Hogan | Sarsfields | 0-13 | 13 | Newtownshandrum |
| 8 | Alan Walsh | Kanturk | 3-03 | 12 | Charleville |
| 8 | Jamie Coughlan | Newtownshandrum | 2-06 | 12 | Bishopstown |
| 8 | Declan Dalton | Fr O'Neill's | 1-09 | 12 | Newcestown |
| 8 | Brian O'Sullivan | Kanturk | 0-12 | 12 | Midleton |
