= Billy Hennessy =

Irish hurler

Personal information
- Native name: Liam Ó hAonasa (Irish)
- Born: 15 August 1997 (age 29) Cork, Ireland
- Occupation: Engineer
- Height: 6 ft 0 in (183 cm)

Sport
- Sport: Hurling
- Position: Left wing-back
Club
Years	Club	Apps (scores)
2015-present	St Finbarr's	21 (4-12)
Club titles
- Munster titles: 1
	Football	Hurling
Cork titles	1	1
College
- Years: College
- 2016-2021: University College Cork
College titles
- Fitzgibbon titles: 1
Inter-county*
Years	County	Apps (scores)
2017-2021 2022-	Cork (hurling); Cork (football)	3 (0-00); 0 (0-00)
Inter-county titles
- Munster titles: 0
- All-Irelands: 0
- NHL: 0
- All Stars: 0
- *Inter County team apps and scores correct as of 21:52, 18 February 2022.

Billy Hennessy (born 15 August 1997) is an Irish hurler who plays as a left wing-back for club side St Finbarr's and at senior level with the Cork county team. He usually lines out as a left wing-back. He is the current captain of the St. Finbarr's premier senior hurling team. He captained St. Finbarr's to a Premier Senior hurling county final win in 2022.

== Playing career ==
=== Christian Brothers College ===
Hennessy first came to prominence as a hurler with Christian Brothers College, a school noted as a rugby union stronghold. Having played hurling in every grade of hurling during his time at the school, he usually lined out in the half-back line on the school's senior team. On 14 October 2015, Hennessy was at right wing-back on the CBC team that recorded a first victory in the Dr Harty Cup in 97 years.

=== St Finbarr's ===
Hennessy joined the St Finbarr's club at a young age and played in all grades at juvenile and underage levels as a dual player of hurling and Gaelic football.

On 28 September 2015, Hennessy was at full-back when the St Finbarr's minor football team defeated Douglas by 1–09 to 0–08 in the final to win a fifth Premier 1 MFC title in nine years.

Hennessy subsequently progressed onto the St Finbarr's under-21 football team. On 6 August 2016, he was at left corner-back on the under-21 team that defeated Ilen Rovers by 1–12 to 0–07 to win the Cork Under-21 Championship title.

=== Cork ===
==== Minor and under-21 ====
Hennessy first played for Cork at minor level during the 2015 Munster Championship. He made his only appearance in the grade on 2 July when he came on as a 53rd-minute substitute for John Looney in a 1–14 to 0–14 defeat by Limerick.

Hennessy subsequently progressed onto the Cork under-21 team. He made his first appearance on 13 July 2017 when he played at left wing-back in a 2–17 to 1-19 Munster semi-final defeat of Waterford. Hennessy was dropped from the starting fifteen for Cork's subsequent 0–16 to 1–11 defeat by Limerick on 26 July 2017.

Hennessy won a Munster Championship medal on 4 July 2018 when he lined out at right wing-back in Cork's 2–23 to 1–13 defeat of Tipperary in the final. On 26 August, he was switched to left wing-back in Cork's 3–13 to 1-16 All-Ireland final defeat by Tipperary in what was his last game in the grade. Hennessy was later named at left wing-back on the Team of the Year.

==== Senior ====
Hennessy made his first appearance for the Cork senior hurling team in the pre-season Canon O'Brien Cup on 6 January 2017. He scored a point from midfield in the 0–22 to 1–13 defeat by University College Cork. On 15 January, Hennessy also scored a point after being introduced as a 62nd-minute substitute in Cork's 7–22 to 1–19 defeat of Limerick in the Munster Hurling League. He played no further role in Cork's National League or Championship campaigns.

Hennessy was a late addition to the Cork senior team during the 2018 All-Ireland Championship. On 29 July, he was an unused substitute when Cork suffered a 3–32 to 2-21 extra-time defeat by Limerick in the All-Ireland semi-final.

Hennessy was ruled out of the start of the 2019 season as he was recuperating after an operation.

== Career statistics ==
=== Club ===
As of match played 29 August 2021.

Team	Year	Cork PSHC	
Team	Year	Apps	Score
St Finbarr's	2015	3	0-01
St Finbarr's	2016	6	0-02
St Finbarr's	2017	2	1-01
St Finbarr's	2018	3	1-01
St Finbarr's	2019	4	1-03
St Finbarr's	2020	3	1-04
Career total		21	4-12

=== Inter-county ===
As of 31 July 2021.

Team	Year	National League			Munster		All-Ireland		Total	
Team	Year	Division	Apps	Score	Apps	Score	Apps	Score	Apps	Score
Cork	2017	Division 1A	—		—		—		—	
Cork	2018	Division 1A	—		—		0	0-00	0	0-00
Cork	2019	Division 1A	—		—		—		—	
Cork	2020	Division 1A	0	0-00	1	0-00	1	0-00	2	0-00
Cork	2021	Division 1A	4	0-01	0	0-00	1	0-00	5	0-01
Total			4	0-01	1	0-00	2	0-00	7	0-01

== Honours ==
St. Finbarr's

- Cork Premier Senior Hurling Championship: 2022 (c)
- Cork Premier Senior Football Championship: 2021
- Cork Under-21 Football Championship: 2016
- Seandún Under-21 Football Championship: 2016, 2017, 2018
- Cork Premier 1 Minor Football Championship: 2015

Cork

- Munster Under-21 Hurling Championship: 2018
