= Aaron Myers =

Irish hurler

Personal information
- Native name: Aron Ó Mír (Irish)
- Born: 1997 (age 28–29) Glanmire, County Cork, Ireland
- Occupation: Student
- Height: 6 ft 3 in (191 cm)

Sport
- Sport: Hurling
- Position: Right corner-forward
Club*
Years	Club	Apps (scores)
2017-present	Sarsfields	9 (3-26)
Club titles
- Cork titles: 0
Inter-county**
Years	County	Apps (scores)
2018	Cork	0 (0-00)
Inter-county titles
- Munster titles: 0
- All-Irelands: 0
- NHL: 0
- All Stars: 0
- * club appearances and scores correct as of 22:51, 20 March 2019. **Inter County team apps and scores correct as of 22:29, 20 March 2019.

Aaron Myers (born 1997) is an Irish hurler who plays for Cork Senior Championship club Sarsfields. He is a former member of the Cork senior hurling team. Myers usually lines out as a right corner-forward.

== Honours ==
Sarsfields

- East Cork Junior A Hurling Championship: 2016
- Cork Premier Under-21 A Hurling Championship: 2017
- Cork Minor Hurling Championship: 2014

Cork

- Munster Under-21 Hurling Championship: 2018
