= 2022 Cork Premier Senior Hurling Championship =

Annual hurling competition season

- Dates: 7 June - 16 October 2022
- Teams: 12 clubs 6 divisions 2 colleges
- Sponsor: Co-Op Superstores
- Champions: St. Finbarr's (26th title); Billy Hennessy (captain); Ger Cunningham (manager)
- Runners-up: Blackrock; Alan Connolly (captain); Louis Mulqueen (manager)
- Relegated: Na Piarsaigh

Tournament statistics
- Matches played: 35
- Goals scored: 94 (2.69 per match)
- Points scored: 1371 (39.17 per match)
- Top scorer(s): Stephen Condon (3-47); Ben Cunningham (2-50)

The 2022 Cork Premier Senior Hurling Championship was the third staging of the Cork Premier Senior Hurling Championship and the 134th staging overall of a championship for the top-ranking hurling teams in Cork. The draw for the group stage placings took place on 8 February 2022. The championship ran from 7 June to 16 October 2022.

Midleton entered the championship as the defending champions, however, they failed to qualify for the knockout stage after losing two games and finishing bottom of Group A. Na Piarsaigh's relegation ended 65 years of top tier hurling for the club.

The final was played on 16 October 2022 at Páirc Uí Chaoimh in Cork, between Blackrock and St. Finbarr's, in what was their first meeting in the final in 40 years. St. Finbarr's won the match by 2–14 to 1–07 to claim their 26th championship title overall and a first title in 29 years.

Stephen Condon and Ben Cunningham were the championship's joint-top scorers.

== Team changes ==
=== To Championship ===
Promoted from the Cork Senior A Hurling Championship

- Kanturk

=== From Championship ===
Relegated to the Cork Senior A Hurling Championship

- Carrigtwohill

== Participating teams ==
=== Clubs ===
The seedings were based on final group stage positions from the 2021 championship.

Top seeds Second seeds

Team	Location	Colours	Manager	Captain(s)
Midleton	Midleton	Black and white	James O'Connor	Conor Lehane
Glen Rovers	Blackpool	Green, black and yellow	Mark Kennefick	Cathal Hickey
Sarsfields	Glanmire	Blue, black and white	Barry Myers	Daniel Kearney
Blackrock	Blackrock	Green and yellow	Louis Mulqueen	John Cashman; Shane O'Keeffe
Douglas	Douglas	Green, white and black	Mark O'Callaghan	Mark Harrington
Erin's Own	Glounthaune	Blue and red	Martin Bowen	Cian O'Connor; Robbie O'Flynn
Bishopstown	Bishopstown	Maroon and white	Barry Cullinane	Barry Murphy
Charleville	Charleville	Red and white	Mark Foley	Jack Meade
Na Piarsaigh	Farranree	Black and yellow	Frank Nodwell	Eddie Gunning
Newtownshandrum	Newtownshandrum	Green and yellow	Shane Naughten	Tim O'Mahony
St. Finbarr's	Togher	Blue and yellow	Ger Cunningham	Billy Hennessy
Kanturk	Kanturk	White and green	Tom Walsh	Darren Browne

=== Divisions and colleges ===
Team	Location	Colours	Manager(s)	Captain
Avondhu	North Cork	Black and yellow	Joe O'Brien	Mark Keane
Carbery	West Cork	Purple and yellow	Charlie Vaughan	Jeremy Ryan
Carrigdhoun	Southeast Cork	Red and white	Declan O'Neill	
Duhallow	Duhallow	Orange and black	Donie O'Mahony	Seán Howard
Imokilly	East Cork	Red and white	Denis Ring	Brian Lawton
MTU Cork	Bishopstown	Red and white	John Mortell	Ger Collins
Muskerry	Mid Cork	Green and white	Diarmuid Kirwan	Fenton Denny
University College Cork	College Road	Red and black	Paddy Crowley	Éanna Desmond

== Group A ==
=== Group A table ===
Advanced to knockout stage

Team	Matches				Score			Pts
Team	Pld	W	D	L	For	Against	Diff	Pts
Newtownshandrum	3	2	0	1	68	69	-1	4
Douglas	3	2	0	1	84	68	16	4
Kanturk	3	1	0	2	52	72	-20	2
Midleton	3	1	0	2	81	76	5	2

=== Group A results ===
29 July 2022 Round 1	Midleton	1-23 - 2-24	Douglas	Páirc Uí Rinn
	C Lehane 0-10 (0-6 f), C Beausang 0-6, L O’Farrell 1-1, R O’Regan 0-3, S O’Leary-Hayes, P Haughney 0-1 each.	Report	S Kingston 1-12 (0-6 f), C O’Donovan, M Harrington 0-3 each, M O’Connor 1-0, E Dolan, C Kingston 0-2 each, A Cadogan, D Burke 0-1 each.	Referee: S Stokes (Tullylease)

30 July 2022 Round 1	Kanturk	1-11 - 0-18	Newtownshandrum	Dr. Mannix Sportsfield
	B O’Sullivan (0-6, 0-4 frees, 0-2 ‘65s), Alan Walsh (1-1), Aidan Walsh, R Walsh, I Walsh and L McLoughlin (0-1 each).		J Coughlan (0-6, 0-3 frees, 0-1 ’65), T O’Mahony (0-3, 0-2 frees), J Lane and C Twomey (0-2 each), C O’Brien, D O’Connor, C Griffen, C Naughton and S Griffin (0-1 each).	Referee: M Maher (St. Finbarr's)

6 August 2022 Round 2	Douglas	2-24 - 1-10	Kanturk	Mourneabbey Grounds
	S Kingston 1-12 (0-8 f), C Kingston 0-4, M O’Connor 1-0, C O’Donovan, N Hartnett 0-2 each, M Howell, D Harte, E Dolan, M Harrington 0-1 each.	Report	B O’Sullivan 0-9 (0-5 f, 0-2 65), L O’Keeffe 1-0, C Walsh 0-1.	Referee: A O'Connor (Ballygarvan)

6 August 2022 Round 2	Midleton	1-28 - 1-18	Newtownshandrum	Páirc Uí Rinn
	C Lehane 0-15 (0-11 f, 0-1 65), L O’Farrell 0-4, T O’Connell 1-0, C Beausang 0-3, P Haughney, S Quirke 0-2 each, A Quirke, P White 0-1 each.	Report	J Coughlan 0-11 (0-9 f), J Twomey 0-4, M Bowles 1-0, T O’Mahony 0-2 (0-1 65), J Lane 0-1.	Referee: I McCarthy (Bandon)

28 August 2022 Round 3	Douglas	2-18 - 1-26	Newtownshandrum	Mourneabbey Grounds
	S Kingston 2-5 (1-5 f, 1-0 pen), A Cadogan 0-5, M O'Connor 0-2, C Kingston, A O’Connell, D Maher (f), M Harrington, C O’Donovan 0-1 each.	Report	J Coughlan 0-12 (0-8 f), C O’Brien 1-1, C Naughton 0-3, T O’Mahony (0-1 f), M Thompson 0-2 each, J Twomey, J Lane, R Geary, S Griffin, C Griffin 0-1 each.	Referee: S Scanlon (Newcestown)

28 August 2022 Round 3	Midleton	3-15 - 2-19	Kanturk	Páirc Mac Gearailt
	C Lehane (0-9, 0-8 frees); P White, R O’Regan (1-1 each); S Quirke (1-0); P Haughney (0-2); S O’Leary Hayes, C Beausang (0-1 each).	Report	B O’Sullivan (0-8, 0-6 frees, 0-2 ‘65s); A Walsh (1-3); C Walsh (1-2); R Walsh (0-3); L McLoughlin, I Walsh, L O’Keeffe (0-1 each).	Referee: D Daly

== Group B ==
=== Group B table ===
Advanced to knockout stage Advanced to relegation play-off

Team	Matches				Score			Pts
Team	Pld	W	D	L	For	Against	Diff	Pts
Erin's Own	3	2	1	0	72	58	14	5
Glen Rovers	3	2	0	1	69	53	16	4
Bishopstown	3	1	1	1	69	68	-8	3
Na Piarsaigh	3	0	0	3	63	85	-22	0

=== Group B results ===
30 July 2022 Round 1	Glen Rovers	0-15 - 1-16	Erin's Own	Páirc Uí Rinn
	P Horgan 0-7 (0-3 f), D Brosnan, E O’Leary 0-2 each, M Dooley, R Dunne, D Noonan, S Kennefick 0-1 each.		E Murphy 0-10 (0-8 f, 0-2 65), R O’Flynn 1-1, M O’Carroll 0-2, K Murphy, C Lenihan, O O’Regan 0-1 each.	Referee: C O'Regan (Ballyhea)

31 July 2022 Round 1	Bishopstown	0-24 - 1-19	Na Piarsaigh	Páirc Uí Rinn
	P Cronin (0-10, 0-5 f), P Morris (0-6), C O’Hora (0-3), B McConville (0-2), I Jones, T Murray, B O’Driscoll (0-1 each).	Report	P O’Rourke (1-3), E Sheehan (0-6, 0-1 f), S Forde (0-4), P Guest (0-3, 0-1 free), K Moynihan (0-2), K Buckley (0-1).	Referee: C Lyons (Nemo Rangers)

7 August 2022 Round 2	Glen Rovers	1-25 - 0-18	Bishopstown	Páirc Uí Rinn
	P Horgan 1-14 (0-6f, 0-3 65), S Kennefick 0-3, D Noonan, B Moylan, D Brosnan 0-2 each, E O’Leary, M Dooley 0-1 each.	Report	P Cronin 0-6 (0-5f), L Lordan, P Morris 0-3 each, T Murray 0-2, D Daly, B O’Driscoll, B Murray, C Hegarty 0-1 each.	Referee: C McAllister (Aghada)

7 August 2022 Round 2	Erin's Own	6-17 - 4-13	Na Piarsaigh	Páirc Uí Rinn
	C Lenihan 3-4, M O’Carroll 2-1, R O’Flynn 0-7 (0-1 f, 0-1 65), S Guilfoyle 1-0, E Murphy (f), J O’Flynn 0-2 each, R Twomey 0-1.	Report	S Forde 2-1, P Guest 0-6 (0-3 f), P Rourke 1-2, K Forde 1-1, E Moynihan 0-3 (0-1 f, 0-1 65).	Referee: C O'Regan (Ballyhea)

28 August 2022 Round 3	Erin's Own	0-18 - 0-18	Bishopstown	Bride Rovers Park
	E Murphy 0-7 (0-5 f), R O’Flynn 0-5, O O’Regan 0-3, R Twomey 0-2, C Lenihan 0-1.	Report	P Cronin 0-11 (0-7 f), P Morris 0-2, C Hegarty, B O’Brien, K O’Halloran, B Murray, T Murray 0-1 each.	Referee: S Stokes (Tullylease)

28 August 2022 Round 3	Glen Rovers	0-26 - 3-07	Na Piarsaigh	Páirc Séamus de Barra
	P Horgan 0-12 (0-8 f, 0-1 65), S Kennefick 0-5, E O’Leary 0-3, D Brosnan and A O’Donovan 0-2 each, M Dooley, C Dorris 0-1 each.	Report	S Forde 2-0, P Guest 1-2 (0-2 f), C Joyce 0-2, C Buckley, L Sheehan, E Sheehan 0-1 each.	Referee: C McAllister (Aghada)

== Group C ==
=== Group C table ===
Advanced to knockout stage Advanced to relegation play-off

Team	Matches				Score			Pts
Team	Pld	W	D	L	For	Against	Diff	Pts
St. Finbarr's	3	2	1	0	80	67	13	5
Blackrock	3	2	0	1	64	62	2	4
Sarsfields	3	1	0	2	67	74	-7	2
Charleville	3	0	1	2	71	79	-8	1

=== Group C results ===
29 July 2022 Round 1	St. Finbarr's	2-19 - 0-25	Charleville	Mallow GAA Complex
	B Cunningham 1-10 (0-7 f, 0-1 65), B Hayes 1-3, E Finn, P Buggy 0-2 each, J Cahalane, G O’Connor 0-1 each.	Report	J Doyle 0-10 (0-8 f), D Fitzgibbon 0-5 (0-1 f), G Kelleher, C Buckley, O O’Connell, M Kavanagh 0-2 each, D Casey, A Cagney 0-1 each.	Referee: C Lane (Banteer)

30 July 2022 Round 1	Sarsfields	0-17 - 1-15	Blackrock	Páirc Uí Rinn
	A Myers 0-8 (0-2 f), J Sweeney, J O’Connor, D Hogan 0-2 each, Colm McCarthy, S O’Regan, Cathal McCarthy 0-1 each.	Report	A Connolly 1-9 (0-6 f), M O’Halloran, R Cotter 0-3 each.	Referee: N Wall (Ballincollig)

6 August 2022 Round 2	Blackrock	1-20 - 0-24	St. Finbarr's	Páirc Uí Rinn
	A Connolly 0-9 (0-6 f, 0-1 65), S O’Keeffe 1-1, R Cotter 0-3, M O’Keeffe, M O’Halloran, T Deasy 0-2 each, J O’Sullivan 0-1.	Report	B Cunningham 0-12 (0-10 f), B Hayes, E Twomey, J Cahalane 0-3 each, B O’Connor, E Finn, C Cahalane 0-1 each.	Referee: N O'Neill (Midleton)

6 August 2022 Round 2	Sarsfields	3-22 - 2-19	Charleville	Mallow GAA Complex
	A Myers 0-9 (0-2 f), J O’Connor 1-3, D Hogan, D Kearney 0-3 each, Colm McCarthy, J Sweeney 1-0 each, S O’Regan 0-2, L Hackett, P Leopold 0-1 each.	Report	D Fitzgibbon 0-10 (0-4 f), A Cagney 2-3, J Doyle 0-3 (0-1 f), D Casey, J O’Callaghan, C Buckley 0-1 each.	Referee: S Stokes (Tullylease)

28 August 2022 Round 3	Sarsfields	0-19 - 4-19	St. Finbarr's	Páirc Uí Rinn
	A Myers 0-8 (0-6 f), J O’Connor, S O’Regan 0-4 each, C Darcy 0-2, P Leopold 0-1.	Report	E Finn 1-4, B Hayes 1-2, B Cunningham 0-4 (0-2 f), J Cahalane 1-1, C Cahalane 0-3, W Twomey 1-0, W Buckley 0-2, C Keane, B O’Connor, P Buggy 0-1 each.	Referee: C O'Regan (Ballyhea)

28 August 2022 Round 3	Blackrock	1-20 - 1-18	Charleville	Mallow GAA Complex
	T Deasy 1-4; A Connolly 0-5 (0-4 f), M O’Halloran 0-4; K O’Keeffe 0-3; Cathal Cormack, D Meaney, R Cotter, Ciaran Cormack 0-1 each.	Report	J Doyle 0-9 (0-3 f, 0-1 65); D Casey 1-0; D Fitzgibbon 0-3; G Kelleher 0-2, T Hawe, J O’Callaghan, A Dennehy, A Cagney 0-1 each.	Referee: N Wall (Carrigaline)

== Divisional/colleges sections ==
=== Preliminary stage ===
7 June 2022 Round 1	Avondhu	2-23 - 3-15	Carbery	Coachford GAA Grounds
	C O’Brien (1-10, 0-7 frees), S Condon (1-8, 0-1 free), B Buckley, J Saich, J Magner, D Jones and D O’Brien (0-1 each).	Report	J Ryan (0-8, 0-5 frees), P Wall (2-0), D O’Donovan (1-1), M Cahalane, M Lawton (sl), C O’Neill, D Lowney, K O’Donovan and F Butler (0-1 each).	Referee: B Barry-Murphy (Aghabullogue)

7 June 2022 Round 1	Carrigdhoun	0-23 - 1-19 (aet)	Muskerry	Charlie Hurley Park
	B Kelleher 0-13 (0-12f), M Murphy 0-3, R Kelleher 0-2, S Fenton, D Drake, K Kavanagh, M O’Sullivan, C Butler 0-1 each.	Report	B Keating 0-8 (0-6f), C O’Driscoll, S Tarrant (0-3f) 0-4 each, T O’Connell 1-0, M Bradley, S Cronin, D Kirwan 0-1 each.	Referee: W Wallace (Aghada)

14 June 2022 Round 2	Duhallow	2-21 - 2-20	Carbery	Coachford GAA Grounds
	T Howard 0-11 (0-3f), B Murphy, C Murphy 1-1 each, S Howard, C Browne 0-3 each, J O’Callaghan, J Curtin 0-1 each.	Report	A Hayes 1-3, D O’Donovan, J Ryan (0-4f) 0-5 each, P Wall 1-2, B Butler 0-2, D Kiely, C O’Neill, A Holland 0-1 each.	Referee: J McEvoy (Blarney)

21 June 2022 Round 3	Carbery	0-10 - 2-16	Muskerry	Cloughduv GAA Grounds
	J Ryan 0-5 (0-1f, 0-1 65), A Holland (0-1f), A McSweeney 0-2 each, A Hayes 0-1.	Report	C O’Driscoll 1-2, B Keating (0-1f), M Walsh 0-3 each, K Murphy 1-0, E Clifford, J Dwyer, D Kirwan 0-2 each, S Tarrant (0-1f), S O’Donoghue 0-1 each.	Referee: A O'Connor (Ballygarvan)

28 June 2022 Semi-final	Carrigdhoun	0-19 - 0-22	Duhallow	Coachford GAA Grounds
	B Kelleher (0-3 frees) 0-8, R McCarthy 0-3, S Fenton, C Desmond 0-2 each, K Kavanagh, K O’Rourke, S Andrews, M Murphy 0-1 each.	Report	S Howard(0-4 frees, 0-1 ‘65) 0-7, C Browne, J O’Callaghan 0-3 each, E Sheahan, B Murphy, B O’Connor, D O’Keeffe 0-2 each, S O’Reilly 0-1.	Referee: A Hyland (Kilworth)

28 June 2022 Semi-final	Avondhu	3-18 - 0-19	Muskerry	Páirc Eoin Mhic Chárthaigh
	S Condon 1-10 (0-4f), J Twomey 1-2, J Magner 1-1, D Jones 0-2, J O’Sullivan, J Saich, B O’Reilly 0-1 each.	Report	S Tarrant 0-6 (0-4f), B Keating 0-4 (0-1f), D Kirwan 0-3, A O’Shea, K Murphy, M Walsh, S Cronin, J Mannix, D O’Keeffe 0-1 each.	Referee: D Daly (Brian Dillons)

5 July 2022 Final	Duhallow	0-22 - 1-28 (aet)	Avondhu	O'Connell Park
	S Crowley 0-7 (0-4f), S Howard 0-4 (0-1f), T Howard, S O’Reilly 0-3 each, C Browne 0-2, J Curtin, B O’Connor, B Murphy 0-1 each.	Report	S Condon 0-14 (0-6f, 0-3 65), B O’Reilly 0-5, C O’Brien 0-3 (0-1 sideline), J Twomey 1-0, J Magner, J Saich 0-2 each, B Buckley, C Buckley 0-1 each.	Referee: S Scanlon (Newcestown)

=== Semi-finals ===
16 August 2022 Semi-final	MTU Cork	2-11 - 7-22	Imokilly	Páirc Uí Rinn
	C O’Leary 0-4, K Browne, D Harrington 1-0 each, F Herr 0-3 (0-2f), C Duggan 0-2, R Sinclair, G Collins (0-1f) 0-1 each.	Report	M Kelly 1-6, S Desmond, W Leahy (0-2f, 0-1 65) 2-3 each, S Harnedy, D Healy 1-1 each, Brian Lawton 0-3, J Stack 0-2, Barry Lawton, J Leahy, S Hegarty 0-1 each.	Referee: I McCarthy (Bandon)

17 August 2022 Semi-final	University College Cork	1-21 - 2-22	Avondhu	Mourneabbey Grounds
	D Kearney 0-7 (0-5f), E Carey, N O’Leary, E Cullinane 0-3 each, P Hynes 1-0, E Power 0-2, P O’Halloran 0-2 each, É Desmond 0-1.	Report	S Condon 1-6, C O’Brien (0-2f), J Twomey 0-5 each, C Buckley 1-1, B Buckley 0-2, M Keane, D Linehan, L Cronin 0-1 each.	Referee: N O'Neill (Midleton)

- Imokilly, MTU Cork and University College Cork received byes to this stage.

=== Final ===
21 August 2022 Final	Imokilly	3-29 - 1-20	Avondhu	Páirc Uí Rinn
	W Leahy 0-11 (0-8 f), S Desmond 1-4, D Healy 1-1, J Leahy 0-4, M McCarthy 1-0, M Kelly 0-3, Brian Lawton, S Harnedy, J Stack 0-2 each.	Report	S Condon 0-9 (0-5 f), C O’Brien 0-6 (0-2 f), M Keane 1-1, D O’Reilly, J Magner, J Twomey, M Lenahan 0-1 each.	Referee: D Daly (Brian Dillons)

== Knockout stage ==
=== Bracket ===
Quarter-Finals
Blackrock (Seandun)	2-23p
Imokilly	1-26
Glen Rovers (Seandun)	0-23
Newtownshandrum (Avondhu)	1-23
Douglas (Seandun)	0-18
St. Finbarr's (Seandun)	0-22

Semi-Finals
Erin's Own (Imokilly)	0-21
Blackrock (Seandun)	3-21
Newtownshandrum (Avondhu)	0-20
St. Finbarr's (Seandun)	2-25

Final
Blackrock (Seandun)	1-07
St. Finbarr's (Seandun)	2-14

=== Relegation playoff ===
10 September 2022 Playoff	Charleville	2-27 - 0-13	Na Piarsaigh	Mourneabbey Grounds
	J Doyle 0-10 (0-4 f, 0-1 65); D Fitzgibbon 0-7 (0-3 f); A Cagney 2-3; T Hawe, J O’Callaghan 0-2 each; G Kelleher, D Casey, O O’Connell 0-1 each.	Report	P Guest 0-7 (0-6 f); E Moynihan 0-5 f, K Moynihan 0-1.	Referee: N O'Neill (Midleton)

=== Quarter-finals ===
9 September 2022 Quarter-final	Glen Rovers	0-23 - 1-23	Newtownshandrum	Páirc Uí Chaoimh
	E O’Leary 0-7 (0-5 f), E Downey 0-6, D Dooling 0-3, M Dooley, D Brosnan, S Kennefick 0-2 each, A O’Donovan 0-1.	Report	C O’Brien 1-4, J Coughlan 0-6 (0-3 f), C Naughton T O’Mahony, 0-4 each, K O’Sullivan, J Lane, R Geary, M Thompson, C Griffin 0-1 each.	Referee: C Lyons (Nemo Rangers)

11 September 2022 Quarter-final	Douglas	0-18 - 0-22	St. Finbarr's	Páirc Uí Chaoimh
	S Kingston 0-8 (0-3 f, 0-3 65), A Cadogan 0-5, E Dolan 0-2, D Harte, C O’Donovan, C Kingston 0-1 each.	Report	B Cunningham 0-5 (0-3 f, 0-1 65), P Buggy, B Hayes 0-3 each, C Cahalane, J Cahalane, W Buckley, B O’Connor, E Twomey 0-2 each, S Cunningham 0-1.	Referee: C McAllister (Aghada)

11 September 2022 Quarter-final	Blackrock	2-23 - 1-26; Penalties: 3-0	Imokilly	Páirc Uí Chaoimh
	R Cotter 1-5, S O’Keeffe 1-1, A Connolly 0-4 (0-3 f), T Deasy, M O’Halloran, K O’Keeffe 0-3 each, D Meaney, M O’Keeffe, N Cashman, A O’Callaghan 0-1 each.	Report	W Leahy 0-11 (0-6 f, 0-2 65), S Harnedy 1-2, M Kelly 0-4, Barry Lawton, S Desmond 0-3 each, J Leahy, D Healy, J Stack 0-1 each.	Referee: S Stokes (Tullylease)

=== Semi-finals ===
25 September 2022 Semi-final	Erin's Own	0-21 - 3-21	Blackrock	Páirc Uí Chaoimh
	R O'Flynn 0-12 (0-5f), E Murphy (0-2f), B Ramsey 0-2 each, M O'Carroll, K Murphy, C Coakley, D Twomey, J O'Flynn 0-1 each.	Report	A Connolly 0-9 (0-2f, 0-1 65), T Deasy 1-4, R Cotter 1-3, M O'Halloran 1-2, M O'Keeffe 0-2, D Meaney 0-1.	Referee: C O'Regan (Ballyhea)

25 September 2022 Semi-final	Newtownshandrum	0-20 - 2-25	St. Finbarr's	Páirc Uí Chaoimh
	J Coughlan 0-11 (0-8f, 0-1 ’65), C Naughton 0-4, T O’Mahony 0-3 (0-2f), C O’Brien 0-2.	Report	B Cunningham 1-10 (0-6f, 0-1 ’65), B Hayes 1-4, C Cahalane 0-4, E Twomey 0-3, W Buckley 0-2, J Cahalane 0-1, S Cunningham 0-1.	Referee: C Lyons (Nemo Rangers)

=== Final ===
16 October 2022 Final	Blackrock	1-07 - 2-14	St. Finbarr's	Páirc Uí Chaoimh
	A Connolly 0-3 (0-1 65, 0-1 f), M O'Keeffe 1-0, S O'Keeffe 0-2, M O'Halloran, D Meaney 0-1 each.	Report	B Cunningham 0-9 (0-3 f, 0-2 65), B Hayes 1-1, C Cahalane 1-0, W Buckley, P Buggy 0-2 each.	Attendance: 15,165; Referee: S Stokes (Tullylease)

== Championship statistics ==
=== Top scorers ===
Overall

Rank	Player	Club	Tally	Total	Matches	Average
1	Stephen Condon	Avondhu	3-47	56	5	11.20
1	Ben Cunningham	St. Finbarr's	2-50	56	6	9.33
3	Shane Kingston	Douglas	4-37	49	4	12.25
4	Jamie Coughlan	Newtownshandrum	0-46	46	5	9.20
5	Alan Connolly	Blackrock	1-39	42	6	7.00
6	Patrick Horgan	Glen Rovers	1-33	36	3	12.00
7	Conor Lehane	Midleton	0-34	34	3	11.33
8	Jack Doyle	Charleville	0-32	32	4	8.00
9	Will Leahy	Imokilly	2-25	31	3	10.33
10	Brian Hayes	St. Finbarr's	4-16	28	6	4.66
10	Robbie O'Flynn	Erin's Own	1-25	28	4	7.00

In a single game

Rank	Player	Club	Tally	Total	Opposition
1	Patrick Horgan	Glen Rovers	1-14	17	Bishopstown
2	Shane Kingston	Douglas	1-12	15	Midleton
2	Shane Kingston	Douglas	1-12	15	Kanturk
2	Conor Lehane	Midleton	0-15	15	Newtownshandrum
5	Stephen Condon	Avondhu	0-14	14	Duhallow
6	Conor Lenihan	Erin's Own	3-04	13	Na Piarsaigh
6	Ben Cunningham	St. Finbarr's	1-10	13	Midleton
6	Ben Cunningham	St. Finbarr's	1-10	13	Newtownshandrum
6	Colin O'Brien	Avondhu	1-10	13	Carbery
6	Stephen Condon	Avondhu	1-10	13	Muskerry
6	Brian Kelleher	Carrigdhoun	0-13	13	Muskerry

=== Miscellaneous ===
- Na Piarsaigh are relegated after 65 years in the senior championship.
- Newtownshandrum qualified for the semi-final stage for the first time since 2011.
- St. Finbarr's qualified for the final for the first time since 1993.
- St. Finbarr's and Blackrock face each other in the final for the first time since 1982.
- St. Finbarr's win the title for the first time since 1993.
