= Conor O'Sullivan (hurler) =

Irish hurler (born 1989)

Personal information
- Native name: Conchur Ó Súilleabháin (Irish)
- Nickname: Sully
- Born: 8 March 1989 (age 37) Glanmire, County Cork, Ireland
- Occupation: Product analyst
- Height: 5 ft 10 in (178 cm)

Sport
- Sport: Hurling
- Position: Left corner-back
Club
- Years: Club
- 2008–: Sarsfields
Club titles
- Cork titles: 4
- Munster titles: 1
College
- Years: College
- 2008–2011: University College Cork
College titles
- Fitzgibbon titles: 1
Inter-county*
Years	County	Apps (scores)
2009–	Cork	15 (0–0)
Inter-county titles
- Munster titles: 3
- All-Irelands: 0
- NHL: 0
- All Stars: 0
- *Inter County team apps and scores correct as of 13:22, 21 June 2019.

Conor O'Sullivan (born 8 March 1989) is an Irish hurler who plays for Cork Senior Championship club Sarsfields and at inter-county level with the Cork senior hurling team. He usually lines out as a left corner-back.

== Playing career ==
=== Glanmire Community College ===
O'Sullivan first came to prominence as a hurler with Glanmire Community College. Having played at every grade, he was a midfielder on the college's senior team that played in the Harty Cup.

=== University College Cork ===
During his studies at University College Cork, O'Sullivan established himself as a forward on the senior hurling team. On 7 March 2009, he lined out at left corner-back when UCC defeated the University of Limerick by 2–17 to 0–14 to win the Fitzgibbon Cup.

=== Sarsfields ===
O'Sullivan joined the Sarsfields club at a young age and played in all grades at juvenile and underage levels. On 27 October 2007, he partnered Daniel Kearney at midfield when Sarsfields defeated Midleton by 2–15 to 1–08 to win the Premier Minor Hurling Championship title.

On 3 May 2008, O'Sullivan made his first appearance for the Sarsfields senior team when he lined out at left corner-back in a 2–09 to 2–08 defeat of Ballinhassig. He retained his position on the starting fifteen throughout the championship. On 28 September, he won his first Cork Senior Championship medal following a 2–14 to 2–13 defeat of Bride Rovers in the final.

After losing the 2009 final to Newtownshandrum, Sarsfields were back in a third successive decider on 10 October 2010. O'Sullivan scored 1-01 from frees in the 1–17 to 0–18 defeat of Glen Rovers.

On 7 October 2012, Sarsfields lined out in their fourth championship final in five seasons. O'Sullivan was at left corner-back and collected his third winners' medal following the 1–15 to 1–14 defeat of Bishopstown.

Sarsfields again failed to retain the title in 2012 after suffering a two-point defeat by Midleton, however, O'Sullivan played in his sixth final in seven seasons on 12 October 2014. Lining out at left corner-back he collected a fourth winners' medal after a 2–18 to 0–08 defeat of Glen Rovers.

=== Cork ===
==== Under-21 ====
O'Sullivan was added to the Cork under-21 panel in advance of the 2009 Munster Championship. He made his first appearance for the team on 3 June 2009 when he lined out at left corner-back in a 2–22 to 0–25 defeat by Tipperary.

==== Senior ====
O'Sullivan first played for the Cork senior team as a member of the so-called Cork "development panel" in late 2008. This new team came into being as a result of the 2008 hurling panel's refusal to play under manager Gerald McCarthy. O'Sullivan made his first appearance on 23 November 2008 when he lined out at right corner-back in a challenge game to celebrate the 150th anniversary of St. Colman's College. He later impressed in some subsequent challenge games and was included on the Cork panel for the 2009 National League campaign. O'Sullivan made his competitive debut on 8 February 2009 when he lined out at left corner-back in a 4–14 to 1–14 defeat by Dublin. When the striking hurlers returned for the latter stages of the National League, O'Sullivan was one of four players retained from the "development panel" who were retained. He was later included in Cork's panel for the 2009 Munster Championship and made his first appearance on 31 May in a 1–19 to 0–19 defeat by Tipperary.

On 6 May 2012, O'Sullivan was named on the bench for Cork's National League final meeting with Kilkenny. He was introduced as a half-time substitute for Stephen McDonnell in the 3–21 to 0–16 defeat.

O'Sullivan lined out in his first Munster final on 14 July 2013. He was named in his usual position of left corner-back for the 0–24 to 0–15 defeat by Limerick. On 8 September, O'Sullivan was again at left corner-back when Cork drew 3–16 to 0–25 with Clare in the All-Ireland final. He retained his position on the starting fifteen for the subsequent replay on 28 September, which saw Cork lose by 5–16 to 3–16.

On 3 July 2014, an ongoing hamstring injury meant O'Sullivan was named on the bench when Cork faced Limerick in a second successive Munster final. He remained on the bench for the entire game but collected a Munster Championship medal following the 2–24 to 0–24 victory.

On 21 April 2015, it was announced that O'Sullivan had left the Cork senior panel. Team selector Johnny Crowley said: "“Obviously, we’d have liked if Conor had stayed...it was his choice, we asked him to think about it but he said he wanted to focus on his club hurling." A change of management at the end of the season saw O'Sullivan return to the Cork senior team. On 29 October, he was named as part of Kieran Kingston's first provisional panel.

On 9 July 2017, O'Sullivan failed to be included on the 26-man match-day panel for the Munster final. He remained a member of the extended panel and collected a second winners' medal following the 1–25 to 1–20 defeat of Clare.

On 1 July 2018, O'Sullivan was named amongst the substitutes for Cork's second successive Munster final-meeting with Clare. He remained on the bench but ended the game with a third winners' medal following a 2–24 to 3–19 victory.

== Career statistics ==
As of match played 16 June 2019.

Team	Year	National League			Munster		All-Ireland		Total	
Team	Year	Division	Apps	Score	Apps	Score	Apps	Score	Apps	Score
Cork	2009	Division 1	6	0-00	1	0-00	1	0-00	8	0-00
Cork	2010	Division 1	2	0-00	0	0-00	0	0-00	2	0-00
Cork	2011	Division 1	4	0-00	0	0-00	1	0-00	5	0-00
Cork	2012	Division 1A	3	0-00	1	0-00	1	0-00	5	0-00
Cork	2013	Division 1A	6	0-01	2	0-00	4	0-00	12	0-01
Cork	2014	Division 1B	0	0-00	0	0-00	0	0-00	0	0-00
Cork	2015	Division 1A	5	0-00	—		—		5	0-00
Cork	2016	Division 1A	2	0-00	1	0-00	2	0-00	5	0-00
Cork	2017	Division 1A	0	0-00	0	0-00	0	0-00	0	0-00
Cork	2018	Division 1A	2	0-00	1	0-00	0	0-00	3	0-00
Cork	2019	Division 1A	2	0-00	0	0-00	0	0-00	2	0-00
Career total			32	0-01	6	0-00	9	0-00	47	0-01
