= List of Cork minor hurling team captains =

This article lists players who have captained the Cork minor hurling team in the Munster Minor Hurling Championship and the All-Ireland Minor Hurling Championship.

== List of captains ==
Year	Player	Club	National	Provincial
1973				
1974	Bill Geaney	Glen Rovers	All-Ireland Hurling Final winning captain	Munster Hurling Final winning captain
1975	Tom Cashman	Blackrock		Munster Hurling Final winning captain
1976				
1977	Stephen Hayes	Glen Rovers		Munster Hurling Final winning captain
1978	Pat Murphy	Na Piarsaigh	All-Ireland Hurling Final winning captain	Munster Hurling Final winning captain
1979	Christy Coughlan	Na Piarsaigh	All-Ireland Hurling Final winning captain	Munster Hurling Final winning captain
1980				
1981				
1982				
1983				
1984				
1985	Michael O'Mahony	Midleton	All-Ireland Hurling Final winning captain	Munster Hurling Final winning captain
1986	Kieran Keane	Glen Rovers		Munster Hurling Final winning captain
1987				
1988				
1989				
1990	Peter Smith	Midleton		Munster Hurling Final winning captain
1991				
1992				
1993				
1994	Brian Hurley	St. Finbarr's		Munster Hurling Final winning captain
1995	Brian O'Keeffe	Blackrock	All-Ireland Hurling Final winning captain	Munster Hurling Final winning captain
1996				
1997				
1998	Cathal McCarthy	St. Finbarr's	All-Ireland Hurling Final winning captain	Munster Hurling Final winning captain
1999				
2000	Mark O'Connor	Erin's Own		Munster Hurling Final winning captain
2001	Tomás O'Leary	Erin's Own	All-Ireland Hurling Final winning captain	
2002				
2003	Niall Horgan	Glen Rovers		
2004	Shane O'Neill	Bishopstown		Munster Hurling Final winning captain
2005	Patrick Cronin	Bishopstown		Munster Hurling Final winning captain
2006	Patrick Horgan	Glen Rovers		Munster Hurling Final winning captain
2007	Stephen McDonnell	Glen Rovers		
2007	Ryan Clifford	Newtownshandrum		
2008	Daniel Roche	Sarsfields		Munster Hurling Final winning captain
2009	Eoin O'Sullivan	Sarsfields		
2010				
2011	Colm Spillane	Castlelyons		
2012	Stephen Murphy	Blackrock		
2013	Cathal Cormack	Blackrock		
2014	Patrick Collins	Ballinhassig		
2015	Shane Kingston	Douglas		
2015	Eoghan Murphy	Sarsfields		
2016	Niall O'Leary	Castlelyons		
2017	Seán O'Leary-Hayes	Midleton		Munster Hurling Final winning captain
2018	Shane Barrett	Blarney		
2019	Daniel Hogan	Sarsfields		
2019	Brian O'Sullivan	Kanturk		
2019	Darragh Flynn	Ballygiblin		
2019	Ethan Twomey	St. Finbarr's		
2020	Eoin Downey	Glen Rovers		
2021	Ben O'Connor	St. Finbarr's	All-Ireland Hurling Final winning captain	Munster Hurling Final winning captain
2022	Ross O'Sullivan; Timmy Wilk	Na Piarsaigh; Cobh		

== See also ==
- List of Cork senior hurling team captains
