= 2021 Cork Premier Senior Hurling Championship =

Annual hurling competition season

- Dates: 14 July - 21 November 2021
- Teams: 12 clubs 5 colleges/divisions
- Sponsor: Co-Op Superstores
- Champions: Midleton (8th title); Conor Lehane (captain); Ger FitzGerald (manager)
- Runners-up: Glen Rovers; Cathal Hickey (captain); Ian Lynam (manager)
- Relegated: Carrigtwohill

Tournament statistics
- Matches played: 29
- Goals scored: 80 (2.76 per match)
- Points scored: 1086 (37.45 per match)
- Top scorer(s): Patrick Horgan (6-56)

The 2021 Cork Premier Senior Hurling Championship was the second staging of the Cork Premier Senior Hurling Championship and the 133rd staging overall of a championship for the top-ranking hurling teams in Cork. The draw for the group stage placings took place on 29 April 2021. The championship began on 14 July 2021 and ended on 21 November 2021.

Blackrock entered the championship as the defending champions, however, they were beaten by Midleton at the semi-final stage. Carrigtwohill were relegated from the championship after being beaten in a playoff by Charleville.

The final was played on 21 November 2021 at Páirc Uí Chaoimh in Cork, between Glen Rovers and Midleton, in what was their first meeting in a final in 30 years. Midleton won the match by 0–24 to 1–18 to claim their eighth championship title overall and a first title since 2013.

Patrick Horgan was the championship's top scorer with 6-56.

== Team changes ==
=== To Championship ===
Promoted from the Cork Senior A Hurling Championship

- Charleville

=== From Championship ===
Relegated to the Cork Senior A Hurling Championship

- Ballyhea

== Participating teams ==
=== Clubs ===
The seedings were based on final group stage positions from the 2020 championship.

Top seeds Second seeds Third seeds Fourth seeds

| Team | Location | Colours | Manager | Captain | Seeding |
|---|---|---|---|---|---|
| Blackrock | Blackrock | Green and yellow | Fergal Ryan | Michael O'Halloran | 1 |
| Glen Rovers | Blackpool | Green, black and yellow | Ian Lynam | Cathal Hickey | 2 |
| Sarsfields | Glanmire | Blue, black and white} | Barry Myers | Daniel Kearney | 3 |
| Douglas | Douglas | Green, white and black | Mark O'Callaghan | Mark Harrington | 4 |
| Erin's Own | Glounthaune | Blue and red | Martin Bowen | Cian O'Connor | 5 |
| Na Piarsaigh | Farranree | Black and yellow | Colm O'Sullivan | Christopher Joyce | 6 |
| Newtownshandrum | Newtownshandrum | Green and yellow | Pat Mulcahy | Conor Griffin | 7 |
| Midleton | Midleton | Black and white | Ger FitzGerald | Conor Lehane | 8 |
| St. Finbarr's | Togher | Blue and yellow | Ronan Curran | Olan Murphy | 9 |
| Carrigtwohill | Carrigtwohill | Blue and gold | Seánie O'Farrell | Pat O'Sullivan | 10 |
| Bishopstown | Bishopstown | Maroon and white | Robin Murray | Ken O'Halloran | 11 |
| Charleville | Charleville | Red and white | Mark Foley | Alan Dennehy | 12 |

=== Divisions and colleges ===
| Team | Location | Colours | Manager | Captain |
|---|---|---|---|---|
| Duhallow | Duhallow | Orange and black | Donie O'Mahony | |
| Imokilly | East Cork | Red and white | Ciarán Cronin | Séamus Harnedy |
| Muskerry | Muskerry | White and green | Diarmuid Kirwan | |
| Seandún | Cork city | Red and white | Justin McCarthy | |
| University College Cork | College Road | Red and black | Tom Kingston | Niall O'Leary |

== Group stage ==
=== Group A ===
==== Table ====
Advance to knockout stage Advance to relegation play-off

| Team | Matches | | | | Score | | | Pts |
| Team | Pld | W | D | L | For | Against | Diff | Pts |
|---|---|---|---|---|---|---|---|---|
| Douglas | 3 | 3 | 0 | 0 | 0-67 | 2-35 | 26 | 6 |
| Glen Rovers | 3 | 2 | 0 | 1 | 4-47 | 2-56 | -3 | 4 |
| Newtownshandrum | 3 | 0 | 1 | 2 | 3-52 | 3-61 | -9 | 1 |
| Bishopstown | 3 | 0 | 1 | 2 | 2-41 | 2-55 | -14 | 1 |

==== Results ====
| 11 September 2021 Round 1 | Glen Rovers | 1-10 - 0-24 | Douglas | Páirc Uí Chaoimh |
| | P Horgan (0-5 f) 0-8, D Brosnan 1-0, C Dorris, D Noonan 0-1 each. | Report | S Kingston (0-6 f) 0-10, D O’Mahony 0-3, M Harrington, M O’Connor, A Cadogan, B Turnbull 0-2 each, C O’Donovan, B Hartnett, E Dolan 0-1 each. | Referee: N Wall (Ballincollig) |

| 12 September 2021 Round 1 | Newtownshandrum | 1-18 - 1-18 | Bishopstown | Páirc Mac Gearailt |
| | C O’Brien 1-2; C Griffin 0-4; M Ryan (two frees), J Coughlan (one sideline) 0-3 each; C Twomey, C Bowles 0-2 each; S Griffin, Jerry Lane 0-1 each. | Report | C O’Driscoll 1-2; J Scally 0-4 (all frees); P Cronin 0-3; C O’Hora, C Hegarty (two frees), B Murray 0-2 each; T Murray, D Lester, B O’Driscoll 0-1 each. | Referee: C McAllister (Aghada) |

| 18 September 2021 Round 2 | Bishopstown | 0-13 - 1-17 | Glen Rovers | Páirc Uí Rinn |
| | P Cronin 0-5 (0-4 f), B Murray 0-4, C O’Driscoll 0-2, Colin O’Driscoll, T Murray 0-1 each. | Report | P Horgan 1-10 (0-6 f), L Coughlan 0-3, S Kennefick, D Brosnan, L Horgan, M Dooley 0-1 each. | Referee: J Larkin (Ballinora) |

| 18 September 2021 Round 2 | Newtownshandrum | 0-15 - 0-23 | Douglas | O'Connell Park |
| | J Coughlan 0-12 f, M Ryan (f), S Griffin, J Lane 0-1 each. | Report | S Kingston 0-14 (0-8 f), E Dolan 0-3, A Cadogan 0-2, M O'Connor, B Hartnett, D O'Mahony, B Turnbull 0-1 each. | Referee: N O'Neill (Midleton) |

| 10 October 2021 Round 3 | Glen Rovers | 2-20 - 2-19 | Newtownshandrum | Clyda Rovers GAA Grounds |
| | P Horgan 2-13 (0-8 f, 0-1 65), D Brosnan 0-2, L Coughlan, L Horgan, M Dooley, C Dorris, E Murphy 0-1 each. | Report | J Coughlan 1-7 (0-4 f, 0-1 pen), D Stack 1-0, M Ryan, T O’Mahony, C Twomey, J Lane 0-2 each, M Thompson, C Griffin, D O’Connor, S Griffin 0-1 each. | Referee: N Wall (Ballincollig) |

| 10 October 2021 Round 3 | Douglas | 0-20 - 1-10 | Bishopstown | Páirc Liam Mhic Cárthaigh |
| | S Kingston 0-10 (0-6 f, 0-1 65), A Cadogan 0-2, D Maher, D Murphy, M Harrington, C O'Donovan, S Moylan, M O'Connor, M Turnbull, D Harte 0-1 each. | Report | J Scally 0-4 (0-3 f), C O'Hora 1-0, T Murray 0-3 (0-1 65), B Murray 0-2 (0-1 65), C Hegarty 0-1. | Referee: A O'Connor (Ballygarvan) |

=== Group B ===
==== Table ====
Advance to knockout stage Advance to relegation play-off

| Team | Matches | | | | Score | | | Pts |
| Team | Pld | W | D | L | For | Against | Diff | Pts |
|---|---|---|---|---|---|---|---|---|
| Sarsfields | 3 | 3 | 0 | 0 | 10-67 | 4-41 | 44 | 6 |
| Midleton | 3 | 2 | 0 | 1 | 4-64 | 4-49 | 15 | 4 |
| Na Piarsaigh | 3 | 1 | 0 | 2 | 2-47 | 4-70 | -29 | 2 |
| Carrigtwohill | 3 | 0 | 0 | 3 | 1-45 | 5-63 | -30 | 0 |

==== Results ====
| 11 September 2021 Round 1 | Midleton | 0-24 - 1-14 | Carrigtwohill | Páirc Uí Rinn |
| | C Lehane (0-11, 0-3 frees, 0- 2 ‘65); P Haughney (0-4); R O’Regan, L O’Farrell (0-2 each); T O’Connell, C Walsh, S O’Farrell, S O’Meara, P White (0-1 each). | Report | L Gosnell (0-6, 0-6 frees); S Devlin (1-2, 1-2 frees); S Walsh (0-5, 0-4 frees, 0-1 ‘65); B Twomey (0-1). | Referee: M Maher |

| 11 September 2021 Round 1 | Sarsfields | 2-28 - 2-12 | Na Piarsaigh | Páirc Uí Rinn |
| | A Myers 0-14 (0-10 f), J Sweeney, D Hogan 1-2, C Darcy 0-3, J O’Connor 0-2, D Kearney 0-2, L Hackett, E Murphy, C McCarthy 0-1 each. | Report | E Sheehan 1-2, K Forde 1-1, D Connery 0-4 f, P Guest 0-2, S Forde, C Hanifin, C Bowen 0-1 each. | Referee: D Copps (Ballyhea) |

| 17 September 2021 Round 2 | Na Piarsaigh | 0-14 - 2-26 | Midleton | Páirc Uí Rinn |
| | C Hanifin 0-3 (0-1 65), E Sheehan 0-3 (0-1 f), C Joyce 0-2, D Connery 0-2 f, C Buckley, K Forde, P Guest, K Moynihan 0-1 each. | Report | L O’Farrell 2-4, C Beausang 0-7, C Lehane 0-6 (0-2 f, 0-1 65), P Haughney, S Quirke 0-3 each, Sean O’Farrell 0-2, P White 0-1. | Referee: N Wall (Ballincollig) |

| 19 September 2021 Round 2 | Carrigtwohill | 0-15 - 5-18 | Sarsfields | Erin's Own GAA Grounds |
| | S Walsh 0-7 (0-3 f), L Gosnell 0-5 (0-4 f), B Twomey, L O’Sullivan, S Devlin (f) 0-1 each. | Report | A Myers 1-9 (1-0 pen, 0-6 f), D Hogan 3-0, D Kearney 0-5, J O’Connor 1-0, J Sweeney 0-3, P O’Driscoll 0-1. | Referee: D Daly (Brian Dillons) |

| 10 October 2021 Round 3 | Sarsfields | 3-21 - 2-14 | Midleton | Páirc Uí Rinn |
| | A Myers 0-10 (0-7 f), L Hackett 2-0, D Kearney 0-5, J Sweeney 1-2, D Hogan, J O’Connor, L Healy (f), K Murphy 0-1 each. | Report | C Lehane 0-6 (0-4 f), L O’Farrell 1-2, S Quirke 0-3, D Quirke 1-0, P Haughney 0-2, C Beausang 0-1. | Referee: D Kirwan (Éire Óg) |

| 10 October 2021 Round 3 | Na Piarsaigh | 0-21 - 0-16 | Carrigtwohill | Páirc Uí Chonaill |
| | P Guest 0-8 (0-6 f), Evan Sheehan 0-3, D Connery 0-3 (0-1 65), S Forde, Eoin Sheehan 0-2 each, C Hannifin, C Buckley, P O’Rourke 0-1 each. | Report | L Gosnell 0-8 (0-7 f), S Walsh 0-6 (0-1 f), J Hogan, J Mulcahy 0-1 each. | Referee: I McCarthy (Bandon) |

=== Group C ===
==== Table ====
Advance to knockout stage Advance to relegation play-off

| Team | Matches | | | | Score | | | Pts |
| Team | Pld | W | D | L | For | Against | Diff | Pts |
|---|---|---|---|---|---|---|---|---|
| Blackrock | 3 | 2 | 0 | 1 | 6-61 | 2-57 | 16 | 4 |
| Erin's Own | 3 | 1 | 2 | 0 | 6-51 | 4-55 | 2 | 4 |
| St. Finbarr's | 3 | 1 | 1 | 1 | 5-59 | 8-47 | 3 | 3 |
| Charleville | 3 | 0 | 1 | 2 | 4-53 | 7-65 | -21 | 1 |

==== Results ====
| 10 September 2021 Round 1 | Blackrock | 1-19 - 2-18 | Erin's Own | Páirc Uí Rinn |
| | D Meaney 1-2, A Connolly 0-4 (0-3 f, 0-1 65), A O’Callaghan 0-3, T Deasy, M O’Keeffe, R Cotter 0-2 each, M O’Halloran, G Norberg, S O’Keeffe, D O’Farrell 0-1 each. | Report | E Murphy 1-9 (0-8 f), R O’Flynn 0-6, S Guilfoyle 1-0, C Coakley, M O’Carroll, C Lenihan 0-1 each. | Referee: D Kirwan (Éire Óg) |

| 11 September 2021 Round 1 | St. Finbarr's | 4-22 - 2-15 | Charleville | Mallow GAA Complex |
| | B Cunningham 0-7 (0-2 f, 0-1 65), D Cahalane, B Hayes 1-1 each, C Cahalane 0-4 (0-2 f), I Lordan (pen) B Hennessy 1-0 each, E Finn, J Cahalane 0-3 each; G O’Connor, E Keane, E Twomey 0-1 each. | Report | D Fitzgibbon 1-5 (0-2 f); A Cagney 0-3 (0-1 f); J O’Brien 1-0; D Casey 0-2; J O’Callaghan, G Kelleher, D O’Flynn, J Doyle, T Hawe 0-1 each. | Referee: C McAllister (Aghada) |

| 18 September 2021 Round 2 | Erin's Own | 3-10 - 1-16 | St. Finbarr's | Páirc Uí Chaoimh |
| | R O’Flynn 2-2, B Ramsey 0-3 (0-1f, 0-1 65), C O’Callaghan 1-0, K Murphy 0-2, S Guilfoyle, E Murphy (0-1f), S Kelly 0-1 each. | Report | B Cunningham 1-6 (0-4f), E Finn 0-3, C Dennehy, C Cahalane, B Hayes 0-2 each, J Cahalane 0-1. | Referee: B Coniry (Crosshaven) |

| 18 September 2021 Round 2 | Charleville | 0-18 - 2-20 | Blackrock | Banteer Sportsfield |
| | D Fitzgibbon 0-9 (0-5 f, 0-1 65), G Kelleher 0-3, D O’Flynn, A Cagney 0-2 each, J O’Callaghan, J O’Brien 0-1 each. | Report | A Connolly 1-7 (0-5 f), T Deasy 1-1, R Cotter 0-3, Cathal Cormack, D Meaney, M O’Halloran 0-2 each, N Cashman, S O’Keeffe, M O’Keeffe 0-1 each. | Referee: C Lane (Banteer) |

| 10 October 2021 Round 3 | Blackrock | 3-22 - 0-21 | St. Finbarr's | Páirc Uí Chaoimh |
| | A Connolly 2-9 (0-6, 0-2 65), M O’Keeffe 0-4, M O’Halloran 1-2, S O’Keeffe, J O’Sullivan 0-2 each, R Cotter, S Murphy, Ciarán Cormack 0-1 each. | Report | B Cunningham 0-10 (0-8 f), B Hayes, C Cahalane 0-3 each, J Cahalane 0-2, C Walsh, B Hennessy, E Twomey 0-1 each. | Referee: C Lyons (Nemo Rangers) |

| 10 October 2021 Round 3 | Erin's Own | 1-23 - 2-20 | Charleville | Dr. Croke Park |
| | E Murphy 0-13 (0-11 f); C O’Callaghan 1-0; M O’Carroll, M Collins 0-2 each; S Cronin, J O’Carroll, C Coakley, K Murphy, R O’Flynn, I O’Mahony 0-1 each. | Report | D Fitzgibbon 1-12 (1-9 f); D O’Flynn 0-4; A Cagney 1-0; J Doyle 0-2; J O’Brien, C Buckley 0-1 each. | Referee: C McAllister (Aghada) |

== Divisional/colleges sections ==
=== Round 1 ===
| 14 July 2021 Round 1 | Duhallow | 0-09 - 3-22 | Muskerry | Banteer Sportsfield |
| | M Ellis (0-3, 0-2f, 0-1’65), S O’Reilly 0-3f, K Tarrant, M O’Callaghan, M Vaughan 0-1 each. | Report | C O’Callaghan 0-6 (0-4f), M Lucey (1-3); E Maher 1-1, C O’Driscoll 1-0, M Verling 0-3, K Murphy 0-3, D Holmes 0-2, C Cotter 0-2, M O’Riordan, S Bourke 0-1 each. | Referee: N O'Neill (Midleton) |

=== Round 2 ===
| 21 July 2021 Round 2 | Seandún | 3-17 - 0-16 | Muskerry | Ballincollig Sportsfield |
| | S Duggan 2-1, D O’Neill 0-6 f, C McCarthy 1-2, M Mullins 0-3 D Malone 0-2, N Kelly, MJ Coffey, B Murphy 0-1 each. | Report | M Bradley 0-3 f, B Keating 0-3, M Verling, K Murphy 0-2 each, S Burke, D Holmes, D Desmond, M O’Riordan, C O’Driscoll, M Lucey 0-1 each. | Referee: B Murphy (Carrigtwohill) |

| 28 September 2021 Round 2 | University College Cork | 1-20 - 1-21 | Imokilly | Páirc Uí Rinn |
| | C Bowe, S Conway (0-3f) 0-7 each, E Power 1-1, M Kehoe 0-2, E Carey, P Cadell, N Montgomery 0-1 each. | Report | L O’Shea 0-5f, A Spillane 1-2, S O’Regan 0-4, M McCarthy 0-3, Barry Lawton (0-1f), Brian Lawton, S Harnedy 0-2 each, C Joyce 0-1. | Referee: D Kirwan (Éire Óg) |

=== Final ===
| 3 October 2021 Final | Seandún | 0-16 - 4-36 | Imokilly | Páirc Uí Rinn |
| | N Kelly 0-8 (0-4 f), D O’Neill 0-3 (0-2 f), B Murphy, K Punch, K Ahern, K Murphy, K Ryan 0-1 each. | Report | L O’Shea 0-10 (0-2 f), M Kelly 0-7, S Desmond 1-3, S O’Regan 1-2, Barry Lawton 0-5, J Stack 1-1, S Hegarty 1-0, A Fenton, Brian Lawton 0-2 each, M McCarthy, D Kearney, D Mangan, B Mulcahy 0-1 each. |

== Relegation playoff ==
=== Playoff ===
| 23 October 2021 Playoff | Carrigtwohill | 2-22 - 1-25; Penalties: 2-3 | Charleville | Páirc Mac Gearailt |
| | S Walsh 0-10 (0-6 f, 0-2 65), L Gosnell 1-4, J Mulcahy 1-3, B Twomey, T Hogan 0-2 each, P Hogan 0-1. | Report | D Fitzgibbon 0-9 (0-4 f, 0-1 65), D O’Flynn 0-5, C Buckley 1-0, M Kavanagh, J Doyle 0-3 each, A Cagney 0-2, C O’Carroll, G Kelleher, J O’Brien 0-1 each. | Referee: M Maher (St. Finbarr's) |

== Knockout stage ==
=== Bracket ===
Quarter-Finals
Imokilly | 1-14
Glen Rovers | 1-15
Douglas | 1-12
Blackrock | 3-16
Erin’s Own | 0-19
Midleton | 0-23

Semi-Finals
Glen Rovers | 1-17
Sarsfields | 0-18
Blackrock | 3-19
Midleton | 4-22

Final
Glen Rovers | 1-18
Midleton | 0-24

=== Quarter-finals ===
| 22 October 2021 Quarter-final | Erin's Own | 0-19 - 0-23 | Midleton | Páirc Uí Chaoimh |
| | E Murphy 0-6 (0-5 f), R O’Flynn 0-4, M O’Carroll, B Ramsey (0-1 f) 0-2 each, S Bowen (f), J O’Carroll, K Murphy, M Collins and R Twomey 0-1 each. | Report | C Lehane 0-9 (0-6 f, 0-1 65), C Beausang, L O’Farrell 0-4 each, C Walsh, S Quirke 0-2 each, A Mulcahy, R O'Regan 0-1 each. | Referee: N Wall (Ballincollig) |

| 24 October 2021 Quarter-final | Douglas | 1-12 - 3-16 | Blackrock | Páirc Uí Chaoimh |
| | B Turnbull (1-2), S Kingston (0-4, 0-3 frees), A Cadogan and M O’Connor (0-2 each), B Hartnett and C O’Donovan (0-1 each). | Report | A Connolly (2-3, 0-3 frees), R Cotter (1-2) M O’Halloran (0-4), M O’Keeffe and S O’Keeffe (0-2 each), J O’Sullivan, N Cashman and S Murphy (0-1 each). | Referee: C McAllister (Aghada) |

| 24 October 2021 Quarter-final | Imokilly | 1-14 - 1-15 | Glen Rovers | Páirc Uí Chaoimh |
| | S O’Regan 1-3 (0-1 f), L O’Shea 0-4 (0-3 f, 0-1 65), Brian Lawton 0-3, S Harnedy 0-2, M McCarthy, M Kelly 0-1 each. | Report | P Horgan 1-2 (0-1 65), B Moylan (f), S Kennefick 0-3 each, D Noonan, D Brosnan 0-2 each, L Horgan, M Dooley, C Dorris 0-1 each. | Referee: S Stokes (Tullylease) |

=== Semi-finals ===
| 7 November 2021 Semi-final | Blackrock | 3-19 - 4-22 | Midleton | Páirc Uí Chaoimh |
| | A Connolly 0-8 (0-7 f), J O'Sullivan 1-3, N Cashman 1-2 (0-1 65), M O'Keeffe 1-0, D Meaney, R Cotter 0-2 each, S Murphy 0-1. | Report | C Lehane 0-10 (0-6 f), C Beausang 1-4, R O'Regan 1-2, L O'Farrell 1-1, P White 1-0, P Haughney 0-2, S O'Leary-Hayes, T O'Connell, S Quirke 0-1 each. | Referee: C Lyons (Nemo Rangers) |

| 7 November 2021 Semi-final | Sarsfields | 0-18 - 1-17 | Glen Rovers | Páirc Uí Chaoimh |
| | A Myers 0-8 (0-5f), J O’Connor 0-5, C Darcy 0-2, K Murphy, L Hackett, B Nodwell 0-1 each. | Report | P Horgan 1-11 (0-5f, 0-1 65), D Brosnan, S Kennefick 0-2 each, C Dorris, A O’Donovan 0-1 each. | Referee: D Kirwan (Éire Óg) |

=== Final ===
| 21 November 2021 Final | Midleton | 0-24 - 1-18 | Glen Rovers | Páirc Uí Chaoimh |
| | C Lehane 0-13 (0-8 f), R O’Regan 0-4, P White, C Beausang, S O’Meara 0-2 each, L O’Farrell 0-1. | Report | P Horgan 1-12 (0-10 f), S Kennefick 0-3, D Brosnan, L Horgan, E Downey 0-1 each. | Referee: M Maher (St Finbarr's) |

== Championship statistics ==
=== Top scorers ===
Overall

| Rank | Player | Club | Tally | Total | Matches | Average |
|---|---|---|---|---|---|---|
| 1 | Patrick Horgan | Glen Rovers | 6-56 | 74 | 6 | 12.33 |
| 2 | Conor Lehane | Midleton | 0-55 | 55 | 6 | 9.16 |
| 3 | Alan Connolly | Blackrock | 5-31 | 46 | 5 | 9.20 |
| 4 | Aaron Myers | Sarsfields | 1-41 | 44 | 4 | 11.00 |
| 5 | Darragh Fitzgibbon | Charleville | 2-35 | 41 | 4 | 10.25 |
| 6 | Shane Kingston | Douglas | 0-38 | 38 | 4 | 9.50 |
| 7 | Eoghan Murphy | Erin's Own | 1-29 | 32 | 4 | 8.00 |
| 8 | Seán Walsh | Carrigtwohill | 0-28 | 28 | 4 | 7.00 |
| 9 | Luke O'Farrell | Midleton | 4-14 | 26 | 6 | 4.33 |
| 9 | Ben Cunningham | St. Finbarr's | 1-23 | 26 | 3 | 8.66 |
| 9 | Liam Gosnell | Carrigtwohill | 1-23 | 26 | 4 | 6.50 |

In a single game

| Rank | Player | Club | Tally | Total | Opposition |
|---|---|---|---|---|---|
| 1 | Patrick Horgan | Glen Rovers | 2-13 | 19 | Newtownshandrum |
| 2 | Alan Connolly | Blackrock | 2-09 | 15 | St. Finbarr's |
| 2 | Darragh Fitzgibbon | Charleville | 1-12 | 15 | Erin's Own |
| 2 | Patrick Horgan | Glen Rovers | 1-12 | 15 | Midleton |
| 5 | Patrick Horgan | Glen Rovers | 1-11 | 14 | Sarsfields |
| 5 | Aaron Myers | Sarsfields | 0-14 | 14 | Na Piarsaigh |
| 5 | Shane Kingston | Douglas | 0-14 | 14 | Newtownshandrum |
| 8 | Patrick Horgan | Glen Rovers | 1-10 | 13 | Bishopstown |
| 8 | Eoghan Murphy | Erin's Own | 0-13 | 13 | Charleville |
| 8 | Conor Lehane | Midleton | 0-13 | 13 | Glen Rovers |

=== Miscellaneous ===
- Seandún return to the championship for the first time since the 2010 Championship
- Seandún recorded their first championship victory over Muskerry in 62 years. It was also the divisional sides first championship win since 2003.
- Midleton win the title for the first time since 2013.
- Glen Rovers become the first team since Cloyne in 2006 to lose three finals in a row.
