= Dan O'Neill (hurler) =

Irish hurler

Personal information
- Native name: Dónall Ó Néill (Irish)
- Born: 27 January 1973 (age 53) Zambia
- Occupation: Veterinary inspector
- Height: 5 ft 9 in (175 cm)

Sport
- Sport: Hurling
- Position: Midfield
Club
- Years: Club
- Dicksboro
Club titles
- Kilkenny titles: 1
College
- Years: College
- 1991-1996: University College Dublin
College titles
- Fitzgibbon titles: 1
Inter-county
- Years: County
- 1995-1998: Kilkenny
Inter-county titles
- Leinster titles: 1
- All-Irelands: 0
- NHL: 0
- All Stars: 0

Daniel Gerard O'Neill (born 27 January 1973) is an Irish former hurler who played for Kilkenny Championship club Dicksboro and at inter-county level with the Kilkenny senior hurling team. He lined out in a number of positions but usually at midfield.

== Career ==
O'Neill played hurling at club level at juvenile and underage levels with Dicksboro. He lined out in various schoolboy competitions with Kilkenny CBS before later winning a Fitzgibbon Cup college title with University College Dublin in 1993. O'Neill claimed his first title at adult level when Dicksboro won the Kilkenny IHC title in 1991 before later winning a Kilkenny SHC title in 1993. Later in his club career, he won an All-Ireland Intermediate Club Hurling Championship title in 2006.

At inter-county level, O'Neill first appeared as a member of the Kilkenny minor hurling team that won consecutive All-Ireland MHC titles in 1990 and 1991. He also won an All-Ireland U20HC with the under-21 team in 1994. O'Neill joined the Kilkenny senior hurling team in 1995. He was an unused substitute when Kilkenny were beaten by Offaly in the 1998 All-Ireland final.

== Honours ==
University College Dublin

- Fitzgibbon Cup: 1993

Dicksboro

- Kilkenny Senior Hurling Championship: 1993
- All-Ireland Intermediate Club Hurling Championship: 2005
- Leinster Intermediate Club Hurling Championship: 2005
- Kilkenny Intermediate Hurling Championship: 1991, 2005

Kilkenny

- Leinster Senior Hurling Championship: 1998
- All-Ireland Under-21 Hurling Championship: 1994
- Leinster Under-21 Hurling Championship: 1993, 1994
- All-Ireland Minor Hurling Championship: 1990, 1991
- Leinster Minor Hurling Championship: 1990, 1991

Sporting positions
Preceded by James McDermott	Kilkenny minor hurling team captain 1991	Succeeded by Brian McEvoy
Achievements
Preceded by James McDermott	All-Ireland Minor Hurling Final winning captain 1991	Succeeded by Conor O'Donovan
