= Tony O'Sullivan =

Irish hurler and Gaelic footballer

Personal information
- Native name: Tónaí Ó Súilleabháin (Irish)
- Nickname: The baby Jesus
- Born: 7 January 1963 (age 63) Farranree, Cork, Ireland
- Occupation: Insurance representative
- Height: 5 ft 8 in (173 cm)

Sport
- Sport: Hurling
- Position: Right wing-forward
Club
- Years: Club
- Na Piarsaigh
Club titles
- Cork titles: 2
Inter-county*
Years	County	Apps (scores)
1982–1995	Cork	39 (1–143)
Inter-county titles
- Munster titles: 7
- All-Irelands: 3
- NHL: 1
- All Stars: 5
- *Inter County team apps and scores correct as of 00:21, 29 July 2015.

Anthony O'Sullivan (born 7 January 1963) is an Irish retired hurler and Gaelic footballer who played as a right wing-forward for the Cork senior hurling team.

Born in Farranree, Cork, O'Sullivan first played competitive Gaelic games during his schooling at the North Monastery. He arrived on the inter-county scene at the age of sixteen when he first linked up with the Cork minor teams as a dual player before later joining the under-21 sides. He made his senior hurling debut during the 1982 championship. O'Sullivan immediately became a regular member of the starting fifteen and won three All-Ireland medals, seven Munster medals and one National Hurling League medal. He was an All-Ireland runner-up on three occasions.

As a member of the Munster inter-provincial team on a number of occasions, O'Sullivan won one Railway Cup medal on the field of play. At club level he is a two-time championship medallist with Na Piarsaigh.

O'Sullivan's career tally of 1 goals and 143 points ranks him as one of Cork's highest championship scorers of all-time.

Throughout his career O'Sullivan made 39 championship appearances. His retirement came following the conclusion of the 1995 championship.

In retirement from playing O'Sullivan became involved in team management and coaching. He has served as a selector with the Cork under-21 and senior teams.

During his playing days, O'Sullivan won five All-Star awards as well as being named Texaco Hurler of the Year in 1990. O'Sullivan was also chosen as one of the 125 greatest hurlers of all-time in a 2009 poll, while he was also selected as one of Cork's greatest players of the era in a 2013 selection.

== Playing career ==
=== College ===
During his schooling at the North Monastery, O'Sullivan established himself as a key member of the senior hurling team. In 1980 he won a Harty Cup medal following a 2–10 to 2–5 replay defeat of St. Colman's College. On 27 April 1980 the North Mon faced St. Brendan's Community School in the All-Ireland decider. A 5–11 to 3–7 victory gave O'Sullivan an All-Ireland medal.

=== Club ===
After enjoying championship success in the minor and under-21 grades with Na Piarsaigh, O'Sullivan subsequently joined the senior team. After losing the 1987 championship decider to Midleton, the club qualified for the final again in 1990. Southside kingpins St. Finbarr's provided the opposition, however, the game ended level. The replay was also a close affair, however, a narrow 2–7 to 1–8 victory gave O'Sullivan a Cork Senior Hurling Championship medal.

Na Piarsaigh failed to retain their title, while the club also faced defeat at the hands of Erin's Own in 1992. Three years later O'Sullivan lined out in a fourth championship decider as North Cork minnows Ballyhea provided the opposition. A 1–12 to 3–1 victory gave O'Sullivan a second championship medal.

=== Minor and under-21 ===
O'Sullivan first played for Cork as a member of the minor hurling team on 9 July 1979 when he was introduced as a substitute in Cork's 3–17 to 4–4 provincial final defeat of Limerick. It was his first Munster medal. On 2 September 1979 Cork faced Kilkenny in the All-Ireland decider. O'Sullivan scored 0–2 from right wing-forward and collected an All-Ireland medal as Cork recorded a 2–11 to 1–9 victory. This game marked the end of the most successful period for minor hurling in Cork.

After making his debut with the Cork minor football team on 3 May 1980, O'Sullivan won a Munster medal in that code in 1981 following a narrow 0–9 to 1–5 defeat of Kerry. On 20 September 1981 Cork faced Derry in the All-Ireland decider. A comfortable 4–9 to 2–7 victory gave O'Sullivan an All-Ireland medal in that code.

O'Sullivan's performances with the Cork minor footballers saw him added to the starting fifteen of the under-21 side for the All-Ireland final replay with Galway on 8 November 1981. That game failed to live up to the excitement of the replay, however, a 2–9 to 1–6 victory gave O'Sullivan an All-Ireland medal in the under-21 grade.

As a dual under-21 player in 1982, O'Sullivan enjoyed mixed fortunes. With the hurlers he won his first Munster medal following a 1–14 to 1–4 provincial decider defeat of Limerick. On 12 September 1982 Cork faced Galway in the All-Ireland decider. Cork came from behind in the closing stages to win by a single point scored from long range by Kevin Hennessy. The 0–12 to 0–11 victory gave O'Sullivan an All-Ireland medal. He had earlier won a Munster medal with the under-21 footballers following a 2–12 to 0–4 trouncing of old rivals Kerry.

In 1984 O'Sullivan was in his final year with the under-21 teams. He won a second Munster medal with the footballers as Limerick were accounted for by 1–18 to 0–4. On 26 August 1984 Cork faced Mayo in the All-Ireland decider. A narrow 0–9 to 0–6 victory gave O'Sullivan a second All-Ireland medal.

=== Senior ===
==== Early defeats ====
O'Sullivan made his senior hurling championship debut for Cork on 30 May 1982 when he scored 0–7 in a 1–19 to 2–8 Munster quarter-final defeat of Tipperary. Cork powered their way through the provincial campaign and a massive 5–21 to 3–6 defeat of Waterford in the decider, with O'Sullivan scoring 0–12, gave him a first Munster medal. On 5 September 1982 Cork faced Kilkenny in the All-Ireland decider. "The Cats", who many viewed as the underdogs, surprised all on the day, with Christy Heffernan scoring two goals in a forty-second spell just before the interval to take the wind out of Cork's sails. Ger Fennelly got a third goal within eight minutes of the restart, giving Kilkenny a 3–18 to 1–15 victory. In spite of this defeat O'Sullivan ended his debut year by claiming a first All-Star.

Illness limited O'Sullivan's involvement in Cork's 1983 championship campaign. In spite of this he won a second Munster medal after being introduced as a substitute in Cork's 3–22 to 0–12 defeat of Waterford. The All-Ireland final on 4 September 1983 was a replay of the previous year with Cork hoping to avenge the defeat by Kilkenny. O'Sullivan started the game on the bench but was introduced as a substitute. Billy Fitzpatrick was the star with ten points, giving Kilkenny a 2–14 to 1–9 lead with seventeen minutes left, however, they failed to score for the remainder of the game. A stunning comeback by Cork just fell short and they were defeated by 2–14 to 2–12.

==== First All-Ireland successes ====
Cork were the dominant force in Munster once again in 1984, with O'Sullivan winning a third successive Munster medal following a memorable 4–15 to 3–14 defeat of Tipperary in the provincial showpiece. The subsequent All-Ireland final on 2 September 1984, played at Semple Stadium in Thurles, saw Cork take on Offaly for the first time ever in championship history. The centenary-year final failed to live up to expectations and Cork recorded a relatively easy 3–16 to 1–12 victory. It was O'Sullivan's first All-Ireland medal.

In 1985 O'Sullivan added a fourth successive Munster medal to his collection as Cork defeated Tipperary by 4–17 to 4–11 in the provincial decider once again.

Cork made it five-in-a-row in Munster in 1986 as they defeated Clare by 2–18 to 3–12 to take the provincial title. It was O'Sullivan's fifth successive Munster medal. This victory paved the way for an All-Ireland final meeting with Galway on 7 September 1986. The men from the west were the red-hot favourites against a Cork team in decline, however, on the day a different story unfolded. Four Cork goals, one from John Fenton, two from Tomás Mulcahy and one from Kevin Hennessy, stymied the Galway attack and helped the Rebels to a 4–13 to 2–15 victory. It was O'Sullivan's second All-Ireland medal while a second All-Star quickly followed.

A controversial disallowed goal by O'Sullivan denied Cork a record-breaking sixth successive Munster medal in 1987, while Cork faced defeat by Tipperary once again in the 1988 decider. In spite of this O'Sullivan won a third All-Star at the end of that season.

==== A third All-Ireland medal ====
In 1990 Cork bounced back after a period in decline. O'Sullivan won a sixth Munster medal that year following a 4–16 to 2–14 defeat of Tipperary. The subsequent All-Ireland final on 2 September 1990 pitted Cork against Galway for the second time in four years. Galway were once again the red-hot favourites and justified this tag by going seven points ahead in the opening thirty-five minutes thanks to a masterful display by Joe Cooney. Cork fought back with an equally expert display by captain Tomás Mulcahy. The game was effectively decided on an incident which occurred midway through the second half when Cork goalkeeper Ger Cunningham blocked a point-blank shot from Martin Naughton with his nose. The umpires gave no 65-metre free, even though he clearly deflected it out wide. Cork went on to win a high-scoring and open game of hurling by 5–15 to 2–21. It was a third All-Ireland medal for O'Sullivan. He finished off the year by winning a fourth All-Star before being named Texaco Hurler of the Year.

Cork surrendered their titles in 1991, however, O'Sullivan claimed his seventh and final Munster medal in 1992 following a 1–22 to 3–11 of Limerick. On 6 September 1992 Cork faced Kilkenny in the All-Ireland decider. At half-time Cork were two points ahead, however, two second-half goals by John Power and Michael "Titch" Phelan supplemented a first-half D. J. Carey penalty which gave Kilkenny a 3–10 to 1–12 victory.

==== Decline ====
O'Sullivan won a National Hurling League in 1993 following a 3–11 to 1–12 defeat of Wexford.

Cork's hurling fortunes took a downturn over the next few years and O'Sullivan retired from inter-county hurling following Cork's exit from the 1995 championship.

=== Inter-provincial ===
O'Sullivan was first chosen on the Munster inter-provincial team in 1983, however, the southern province lost out to Connacht in the semi-final.

After being omitted from the team in 1984, O'Sullivan was included at left corner-forward the following year as Munster faced Connacht in the decider. A narrow 3–6 to 1–11 victory gave O'Sullivan a Railway Cup medal.

Munster faced defeat over the course of the next four championships, however, the team bounced back in 1992. O'Sullivan was a non-playing substitute that year as Munster defeated Ulster by 3–12 to 1–8.

== Honours ==
=== Player ===
North Monastery

- Croke Cup (1): 1980
- Harty Cup (1): 1980

Na Piarsaigh

- Cork Senior Hurling Championship (2): 1990, 1995

Cork

- All-Ireland Senior Hurling Championship (3): 1984, 1986, 1990
- Munster Senior Hurling Championship (7): 1982, 1983, 1984, 1985, 1986, 1990, 1992
- National Hurling League (1): 1992–93
- All-Ireland Under-21 Football Championship (2): 1981, 1984
- Munster Under-21 Football Championship (2): 1982, 1984
- All-Ireland Under-21 Hurling Championship (1): 1982
- Munster Under-21 Hurling Championship (1): 1982
- All-Ireland Minor Hurling Championship (1): 1979
- Munster Minor Hurling Championship (1): 1979
- All-Ireland Minor Football Championship (1): 1981
- Munster Minor Football Championship (1): 1981

Munster

- Railway Cup (2): 1985, 1992 (sub)

=== Individual ===
Honours

- The 125 greatest stars of the GAA: No. 56
- Texaco Hurler of the Year (1): 1990
- All-Star (5): 1982, 1986, 1988, 1990, 1992

Awards
Preceded by Nicky English (Tipperary)	Texaco Hurler of the Year; 1990	Succeeded by Pat Fox (Tipperary)
Sporting positions
Preceded by Tomás Mulcahy	Cork Senior Hurling Captain; 1991	Succeeded by Ger FitzGerald
