= Daniel Meaney =

Irish hurler

Personal information
- Native name: Dónall Ó Maonaigh (Irish)
- Born: 1996 (age 29–30) Blackrock, Cork, Ireland

Sport
- Sport: Hurling
- Position: Midfield
Club
- Years: Club
- Blackrock
Club titles
- Cork titles: 1
College
- Years: College
- Cork Institute of Technology
College titles
- Fitzgibbon titles: 0
Inter-county*
Years	County	Apps (scores)
2021-	Cork	0 (0-00)
Inter-county titles
- Munster titles: 0
- All-Irelands: 0
- NHL: 0
- All Stars: 0
- *Inter County team apps and scores correct as of 21:52, 7 May 2021.

Daniel Meaney (born 1996) is an Irish hurler who plays as a midfielder for club side Blackrock and at inter-county level with the Cork senior hurling team.

== Honours ==
Blackrock

- Cork Premier Senior Hurling Championship: 2020
