= Billy Purcell =

Irish hurler

Personal information
- Native name: Liam Puirséil (Irish)
- Born: 30 August 1961 Johnstown, County Kilkenny, Ireland
- Died: 14 August 2019 (aged 57) Kilkenny, Ireland

Sport
- Sport: Hurling
- Position: Left corner-forward
Club
- Years: Club
- Fenians
Club titles
- Kilkenny titles: 0
Inter-county*
Years	County	Apps (scores)
1982–1983	Kilkenny	2 (0-00)
Inter-county titles
- Leinster titles: 2
- All-Irelands: 2
- NHL: 2
- *Inter County team apps and scores correct as of 13:48, 28 June 2014.

William Purcell (30 August 1961 – 14 August 2019) was an Irish hurler who played as a left corner-forward for the Kilkenny senior teams.

Born in Johnstown, County Kilkenny, Purcell first arrived on the inter-county scene at the age of seventeen when he first linked up with the Kilkenny minor team, before later joining the under-21 side. He made his senior debut during the 1982 championship. Purcell enjoyed a brief inter-county career, winning one Leinster medal on the field of play. He also won two All-Ireland medals as a non-playing substitute.

At club level Purcell played with Fenians.

== Honours ==
=== Team ===
Kilkenny

- All-Ireland Senior Hurling Championship (2): 1982 (sub), 1983 (sub)
- Leinster Senior Hurling Championship (2): 1982, 1983 (sub)
- National Hurling League (2): 1981–82 (sub), 1982–83 (sub)
- Leinster Under-21 Hurling Championship (3): 1980, 1981, 1982
- Leinster Minor Hurling Championship (2): 1978, 1979
