= Alan Connolly =

Alan Connolly may refer to:

- Alan Connolly (cricketer)
- Alan Connolly (hurler)
