= Cathal Cormack =

Irish hurler

Personal information
- Native name: Cathal Mac Cormaic (Irish)
- Born: 1995 (age 30–31) Cork, Ireland
- Occupation: Senior associate

Sport
- Sport: Hurling
- Position: Left wing-back
Club
- Years: Club
- 2013-present: Blackrock
Club titles
- Cork titles: 1
College
- Years: College
- 2014-2018: University College Cork
College titles
- Fitzgibbon titles: 0
Inter-county*
Years	County	Apps (scores)
2016; 2023-	Cork	0 (0-00)
Inter-county titles
- Munster titles: 0
- All-Irelands: 0
- NHL: 0
- All Stars: 0
- *Inter County team apps and scores correct as of 20:45, 3 February 2022.

Cathal Cormack (born 1995) is an Irish hurler. At the club level he plays with Blackrock, while he is also a member of the Cork senior hurling team.

== Career ==
Cormack first played hurling at juvenile and underage levels with the Blackrock club, while also playing as a schoolboy with St. Francis College in Rochestown. His underage career began with three successive Cork MHC titles. He was still eligible for the minor grade when he won the first of three Cork PU21HC titles. By this stage, Cormack had joined the Blackrock senior team. He was joint-captain of the team that won the Cork PSHC title after a defeat of Glen Rovers in the 2020 final.

Cormack first appeared on the inter-county scene as captain of the Cork minor hurling team in 2013. He later lined out with the under-21 team in 2016. Cormack was also drafted onto the senior team for that year's National League as a member of the extended panel. After a number of years away from the team, he was recalled under new manager Pat Ryan in advance of the 2023 season.

== Career statistics ==
As of 31 July 2021.

Team	Year	National League			Munster		All-Ireland		Total	
Team	Year	Division	Apps	Score	Apps	Score	Apps	Score	Apps	Score
Cork	2016	Division 1A	0	0-00	—		—		0	0-00
Cork	2017	Division 1A	—		—		—		—	
Cork	2018	Division 1A	—		—		—		—	
Cork	2019	Division 1A	—		—		—		—	
Cork	2020	Division 1A	—		—		—		—	
Cork	2021	Division 1A	—		—		—		—	
Cork	2022	Division 1A	—		—		—		—	
Cork	2023	Division 1A	0	0-00	0	0-00	0	0-00	0	0-00
Career total			0	0-00	0	0-00	0	0-00	0	0-00

== Honours ==
Blackrock

- Cork Premier Senior Hurling Championship: 2020 (jc)
- Cork Premier Under-21 A Hurling Championship: 2012, 2014, 2015
- Cork Minor Hurling Championship: 2011, 2012, 2013

Cork

- Munster Senior Hurling League: 2023

Sporting positions
Preceded by Stephen Murphy	Cork minor hurling team captain 2013	Succeeded by Patrick Collins
