= Tom Kingston (hurler) =

Irish hurler

Personal information
- Native name: Tomás Mac Clochaire (Irish)
- Born: 9 September 1967 (age 59) Tracton, County Cork, Ireland

Sport
- Sport: Hurling
- Position: Goalkeeper
Club
- Years: Club
- Tracton
Club titles
- Cork titles: 0
Inter-county*
Years	County	Apps (scores)
1990-1994	Cork	0 (0-00)
Inter-county titles
- Munster titles: 0
- All-Irelands: 0
- NHL: 0
- All Stars: 0
- *Inter County team apps and scores correct as of 15:11, 26 April 2015.

Thomas M. Kingston (born 9 September 1967) is an Irish retired hurler who played as a goalkeeper for the Cork senior team.

Born in Tracton, County Cork, Kingston first arrived on the inter-county scene at the age of sixteen when he first linked up with the Cork minor team, before later joining the under-21 and junior sides. He joined the senior panel during the 1965 championship. Kingston was sub-goalkeeper for a number of seasons and won one All-Ireland medal, two Munster medals and one National Hurling League medal as a non-playing substitute. He was an All-Ireland runner-up on one occasion.

At club level he is a one-time championship medallist in the intermediate grade with Tracton.

His brother, Kieran Kingston, was also an All-Ireland medallist with Cork.

Kingston's retirement came following the conclusion of the 1994 championship.

In retirement from playing Kingston became involved in team management and coaching. He has been a selector at club level with Tracton and also with University College Cork.

== Playing career ==
=== Club ===
Having lost the championship decider to St. Finbarr's in the intermediate grade in 1990, Tracton reached the final for a second consecutive year in 1991. A narrow 4-14 to 5-9 defeat of Inniscarra gave Kingston an intermediate championship medal.

=== Inter-county ===
==== Minor, under-21 and junior ====
Kingston first played for Cork as a member of the minor hurling team on 2 May 1984 in a 4-11 to 3-12 Munster semi-final defeat by Limerick.

In 1985 Kingston enjoyed his biggest successes with the Cork minor hurlers. He won a Munster medal following a 1-13 to 1-8 defeat of Tipperary. On 1 September 1985 Cork faced Wexford in the All-Ireland decider. The 3-10 to 0-12 victory brought an end to a six-year losing streak and gave Kingston an All-Ireland Minor Hurling Championship medal.

Kingston's performances at minor level saw him drafted onto the under-21 panel as sub-goalie for the unsuccessful 1985 campaign.

After being involved as a non-playing substitute with the Cork junior team in 1986, he was installed as a member of the starting fifteen the following year. A 2-16 to 1-9 defeat of Tipperary gave him a Munster medal. On 25 July 1987 Cork faced Wexford in the subsequent All-Ireland decider. Cork were trailing as the game entered the final moments, however, a comeback and a last minute point from Raymond O'Connor secured a 3-11 to 2-13 victory and an All-Ireland medal for Kingston.

In 1988 Kingston was first-choice goalkeeper on the Cork under-21 team. He won a Munster medal that year following a 4-12 to 1-7 trouncing of Limerick. On 11 September 1988 Cork faced Kilkenny in the All-Ireland decider. The match was played at O'Connor Park in Birr to mark the centenary of the very first All-Ireland final which was played in the town. Cork had a relatively easy 4-11 to 1-5 victory over Kilkenny, giving Kingston an All-Ireland medal in that grade.

==== Senior ====
In 1990 Kingston was added to the Cork senior hurling panel as understudy to regular goalkeeper Ger Cunningham. A 4-16 to 2-14 defeat of reigning provincial and All-Ireland champions secured a first Munster medal as a sub for Kingston. On 2 September 1990 Cork faced Galway in the All-Ireland decider and Kingston was on the bench once again. Cork went on to win a high-scoring and open game of hurling by 5-15 to 2-21, giving Kingston an All-Ireland medal.

Kingston claimed a second Munster medal as a non-playing substitute in 1992 as Cork secured a 1-22 to 3-11 defeat of Limerick. On 6 September 1992 Cork faced Kilkenny in the All-Ireland decider. Kingston remained on the bench for the entire game as "the Cats" claimed a 3-10 to 1-12 victory.

In 1993 Kingston was between the posts for the National League decider with Wexford. A 2-11 apiece draw was the result on that occasion, with Ger Cunningham resuming as 'keeper for the replay. Another drawn game necessitated a replay which Cork won by 3-11 to 1-12. Kingtson collected a National Hurling League medal as a non-playing substitute.

After an unsuccessful championship campaign in 1994, Kingston was replaced as sub goalkeeper by Ian Lynam.

== Honours ==
=== Player ===
Tracton

- Cork Intermediate Hurling Championship (1): 1991

Cork

- All-Ireland Senior Hurling Championship (1): 1990 (sub)
- Munster Senior Hurling Championship (2): 1990 (sub), 1992 (sub)
- National Hurling League (1): 1992-93 (sub)
- All-Ireland Junior Hurling Championship (1): 1987
- Munster Junior Hurling Championship (1): 1987
- All-Ireland Under-21 Hurling Championship (1): 1988
- Munster Under-21 Hurling Championship (1): 1988
- All-Ireland Minor Hurling Championship (1): 1985
- Munster Minor Hurling Championship (1): 1985
