= Christy Coughlan =

Irish hurler

Personal information
- Native name: Criostóir Ó Cochláin (Irish)
- Born: 1961 Cork, Ireland
- Died: 5 January 2001 (aged 40) Cork, Ireland

Sport
- Sport: Hurling
- Position: Left wing-back
Club
- Years: Club
- Na Piarsaigh
Club titles
- Cork titles: 2
Inter-county
Years	County	Apps (scores)
1981-1982	Cork	0 (0-00)
Inter-county titles
- Munster titles: 0
- All-Irelands: 0
- NHL: 0
- All Stars: 0

Christopher Coughlan (1961 – 5 January 2001) was an Irish hurler. At club level he played with Na Piarsaigh and was also a member of the Cork senior hurling team. Coughlan usually lined out as a defender.

== Career ==
Coughlan first played hurling at juvenile and underage levels with the Na Piarsaigh club on Cork's northside. After captaining the club to minor and under-21 championship titles, he subsequently joined the club's senior team and won County Championship titles in 1990, as team captain, and 1995. Coughlan first appeared on the inter-county scene when he captained the Cork minor team to victory over Kilkenny in the 1979 All-Ireland minor hurling final. He progressed onto the Cork under-21 team and, after captaining the team in the first round of the 1982 championship, was dropped from the starting fifteen for the Munster final defeat of Limerick, before later failing to make the matchday panel for the 1982 All-Ireland under-21 final defeat of Galway. Coughlan was also included on the Cork senior hurling team for the National Hurling League. His senior career was hampered due to his emigration to New York.

== Death ==
On 5 January 2002, Coughlan died suddenly after suffering a heart attack after taking part in an over-35 five-a-side soccer tournament in Whitechurch, County Cork.

== Honours ==
Na Piarsaigh

- Cork Senior Hurling Championship: 1990 (c), 1995
- Cork Under-21 Hurling Championship: 1980, 1981 (c)
- Cork Minor Hurling Championship: 1977, 1978 (c)

Cork

- All-Ireland Under-21 Hurling Championship: 1982
- Munster Under-21 Hurling Championship: 1982
- All-Ireland Minor Hurling Championship: 1979 (c)
- Munster Minor Hurling Championship: 1979 (c)

Achievements
Preceded by Pat Murphy	All-Ireland Minor Hurling Final winning captain 1979	Succeeded by Jim Maher
