= Ethan Twomey =

Irish hurler (born 2002)

Personal information
- Native name: Ethan Ó Tuama (Irish)
- Born: 14 September 2002 (age 24) Cork, Ireland
- Height: 6 ft 3 in (191 cm)

Sport
- Sport: Hurling
- Position: Midfield
Clubs*
Years	Club	Apps (scores)
2020-present 2020-present	St Finbarr's (SH); St Finbarr's (SF)	13 (3-16); 7 (2-08)
Club titles
	Football	Hurling
Cork titles	2	1
Munster titles	1	0
College
- Years: College
- 2021-2025: University College Cork
College titles
- Fitzgibbon titles: 0
Inter-county**
Years	County	Apps (scores)
2021-present	Cork	5 (0-01)
Inter-county titles
- Munster titles: 1
- All-Irelands: 0
- NHL: 1
- All Stars: 0
- * club appearances and scores correct as of 21:26, 5 July 2023. **Inter County team apps and scores correct as of 21:26, 7 July 2024.

Ethan Twomey (born 14 September 2002) is an Irish hurler. At club level he plays with St Finbarr's and at inter-county level with the Cork senior hurling team.

== Early life ==
Born and raised in Cork, Twomey first played hurling to a high standard as a student at Presentation Brothers College (PBC). He was captain of the PBC hurling team that claimed the Munster U16½C HC title in 2018 after a 1–18 to 0–12 defeat of Scoil Ruáin in the final. Twomey later studied at University College Cork and was added to their Fitzgibbon Cup panel in 2023.

== Club career ==
A family connection resulted in Twomey playing some juvenile hurling and Gaelic football with the Kilshannig club in Avondhu; however, his underage club career began in earnest with the St Finbarr's club in Cork. He had his first success in 2020 when he captained St Finbarr's to a 2–21 to 3–11 defeat of Sarsfields to claim the Cork Premier 1 MHC title.

Twomey joined both the St Finbarr's senior hurling and Gaelic football teams in 2020. He was part of the extended panel when the club's senior football team won the Cork PSFC title after a defeat of Clonakilty in 2021. He was again part of the panel when St Finbarr's beat Austin Stacks by 2–09 to 1–10 to claim the subsequent Munster Club SFC title.

In October 2022, Twomey was at midfield when St Finbarr's beat Blackrock by 2–14 to 1–07 to win their first Cork PSHC title in 19 years.

== Inter-county career ==
Twomey first appeared on the inter-county scene with Cork as a member of the minor team in 2018, before serving as team captain for a period in 2019. His minor career ended without success, however, he immediately progressed to the under-20 team. Success in this grade was immediate with Twomey claiming Munster and All-Ireland U20HC medals as a member of the extended panel in 2020 after respective defeats of Tipperary and Dublin. He broke onto the starting fifteen the following year claimed a second successive Munster U20HC medal after a two-point defeat of Limerck in the final. Twomey subsequently collected a second successive winners' medal after a defeat of Galway in the 2021 All-Ireland U20 final. His third and final year in the under-20 grade in 2022 ended with a defeat by Tipperary.

Twomey earned a call-up to the senior team training panel in December 2021. He made his Munster SHC debut in a 3–25 to 1–30 defeat by Limerick in 2023.

== Career statistics ==
As of 7 July 2024

Team	Year	National League			Munster		All-Ireland		Total	
Team	Year	Division	Apps	Score	Apps	Score	Apps	Score	Apps	Score
Cork	2022	Division 1A	0	0-00	0	0-00	0	0-00	0	0-00
Cork	2023	Division 1A	4	0-01	1	0-00	—		5	0-01
Cork	2024	Division 1A	2	0-00	3	0-01	1	0-00	6	0-01
Career total			6	0-01	4	0-01	1	0-00	11	0-02

== Honours ==
Presentation Brothers College

- Munster Under-16½ C Hurling Championship: 2018

St. Finbarr's

- Munster Senior Club Football Championship: 2021
- Cork Premier Senior Hurling Championship: 2022
- Cork Premier Senior Football Championship: 2021
- Cork Premier Minor Hurling Championship: 2020

Cork

- Munster Senior Hurling Championship: 2025
- National Hurling League: 2025
- All-Ireland Under-20 Hurling Championship: 2020, 2021
- Munster Under-20 Hurling Championship: 2020, 2021

Sporting positions
Preceded by Darragh Flynn	Cork minor hurling team captain 2019	Succeeded by Eoin Downey
