= 1980 All-Ireland Minor Hurling Championship =

All-Ireland Minor Hurling Championship 1980
All Ireland Champions
- Winners: Tipperary (14th win)
- Captain: Jim Maher

All Ireland Runners-up
- Runners-up: Wexford

Provincial Champions
- Munster: Tipperary
- Leinster: Wexford
- Ulster: Not Played
- Connacht: Not Played

The 1980 All-Ireland Minor Hurling Championship was the 50th staging of the All-Ireland Minor Hurling Championship since its establishment by the Gaelic Athletic Association in 1928.

Cork entered the championship as the defending champions, however, they were beaten by Tipperary in the Munster semi-final.

On 7 September 1980, Tipperary won the championship following a 2-15 to 1-10 defeat of Wexford in the All-Ireland final. This was their 14th All-Ireland title and their first in four championship seasons.

== Results ==
=== Leinster Minor Hurling Championship ===
==== Leinster first round ====
11 May 1980 First round	Laois	2-05 - 2-06	Antrim	Kelly Daly Park

==== Leinster quarter-finals ====
11 May 1980 Quarter-final	Wexford	5-11 - 4-05	Down	Wexford Park

17 May 1980 Quarter-final	Westmeath	2-03 - 8-08	Offaly	Cusack Park

25 May 1980 Quarter-final	Kilkenny	1-11 - 2-09	Antrim	Nowlan Park

==== Leinster semi-finals ====
26 June 1980 Semi-final	Dublin	4-12 - 1-05	Offaly	O'Moore Park

29 June 1980 Semi-final	Wexford	1-12 - 1-10	Antrim	Wexford Park

==== Leinster final ====
13 July 1980 Final	Wexford	1-10 - 2-06	Dublin	Croke Park

=== Munster Minor Hurling Championship ===
==== Munster first round ====
5 July 1980 First round	Waterford	2-09 - 1-16	Clare	Canon Hayes Memorial Park

==== Munster semi-finals ====
5 July 1980 Semi-final	Limerick	1-08 - 0-06	Clare	Gaelic Grounds

10 July 1980 Semi-final	Tipperary	1-14 - 1-07	Cork	Gaelic Grounds

==== Munster final ====
20 July 1980 Final	Tipperary	1-17 - 1-04	Limerick	Semple Stadium
				Referee: W Horgan (Cork)

=== All-Ireland Minor Hurling Championship ===
==== All-Ireland semi-finals ====
3 August 1980 Semi-final	Galway	1-15 - 0-18	Wexford	Croke Park
	J Murphy 0-8, É Ó Faoighil 1-1, T Keady 0-3, A Staunton 0-1, É Ryan 0-1, A Moylan 0-1.		G Coady 0-8, J Codd 0-5, T Morrissey 0-2, A Gahan 0-1, J Byrne 0-1, M Fitzhenry 0-1.	Referee: N Duggan (Limerick)

24 August 1980 Semi-final replay	Wexford	2-13 - 2-7	Galway	Croke Park
	J Codd 1-3, G Coady 0-5, J Barnwell 1-1, T Morrissey 0-2, M Fitzhenry 0-2.		A Moylan 1-2, É Ó Faoighil 1-1, O Kilkenny 0-2, J Murphy 0-1, T Keady 0-1.	Referee: N Duggan (Limerick)

==== All-Ireland final ====
7 September 1980 Final	Tipperary	2-15 - 1-10	Wexford	Croke Park
	A Brown 1-1, W Peters 0-4, M McGrath 0-4, N English 1-0, P Kenny 0-3, J Darcy 0-1, D Finnerty 0-1, J Hayes 0-1.		J Barnwell 1-0, G Coady 0-3, E Murphy 0-2, M Fitzhenry 0-2, J Byrne 0-1, J Codd 0-1, T Morrissey 0-1.	Referee: N Dalton (Waterford)
