= 1993 Kilkenny Senior Hurling Championship =

Annual hurling competition season

- Dates: 13 August 1993 - 7 November 1993
- Teams: 12
- Sponsor: St. Canice's Credit Union
- Champions: Dicksboro (4th title); John Marnell (captain)
- Runners-up: Fenians; Jimmy Brennan (captain)
- Relegated: Clara

Tournament statistics
- Matches played: 16
- Goals scored: 51 (3.19 per match)
- Points scored: 370 (23.13 per match)
- Top scorer(s): Adrian Ronan (5-12); Billy Purcell (1-24)

The 1993 Kilkenny Senior Hurling Championship was the 99th staging of the Kilkenny Senior Hurling Championship since its establishment by the Kilkenny County Board. The championship began on 13 August 1993 and ended on 7 November 1993.

Glenmore entered the championship as defending champions, however, they were beaten by Fenians at the quarter-final stage.

On 7 November 1993, Dicksboro won the championship after a 2–09 to 1–09 defeat of Fenians in the final at Nowlan Park. It was their fourth championship title overall and their first title since 1950.

Adrian Ronan (5-12) and Billy Purcell (1-24) were the championship's joint-top scorers.

== Team changes ==
=== To Championship ===
Promoted from the Kilkenny Intermediate Hurling Championship

- Young Irelands

=== From Championship ===
Relegated to the Kilkenny Intermediate Hurling Championship

- Graignamanagh

== Results ==
=== First round ===
13 August 1993 First round	Ballyhale Shamrocks	2-17 - 1-10	Tullaroan	John Locke Park
	J Shefflin 0-7, T Shefflin 1-1, G Fennelly 1-0, D Fennelly 0-3, L Fennelly 0-2, J Lawlor 0-2, T Phelan 0-1, B Mason 0-1.		P Hennessy 0-6, J Walton 1-0, D Walsh 0-3, C Swayne 0-1.

14 August 1993 First round	Mullinavat	0-13 - 1-05	Clara	Hugginstown Sportsfield
	W Carroll 0-3, M Dunphy 0-3, P McEvoy 0-3, P Hoban 0-1, S Walsh 0-1, R Carroll 0-1, J O'Keeffe 0-1.		L Byrne 1-1, A Prendergast 0-2, R Shortall 0-2.

15 August 1993 First round	Dicksboro	2-11 - 0-14	Young Irelands	Nowlan Park
	S Morrissey 1-2, T Bawle 0-4, S Prendergast 1-0, D O'Neill 0-3, M Dowling 0-1, J Treacy 0-1.		DJ Carey 0-8, P O'Neill 0-2, P Farrell 0-1, T Farrell 0-1, C Carter 0-1, C Fitzgerald 0-1.

15 August 1993 First round	Glenmore	3-21 - 3-09	Graigue-Ballycallan	Páirc na Seamróg
	M 'Foxy' Phelan 1-4, C Heffernan 1-3, R Heffernan 0-5, J Murphy 0-4, W O'Connor 1-0, M Phelan 0-3, J Walsh 0-1, P Barron 0-1.		A Ronan 3-3, D Byrne 0-2, N Maher 0-1, J Teehan 0-1, G Ronan 0-1, J Maher 0-1.

=== Relegation playoffs ===
9 October 1993 Semi-final	Young Irelands	5-07 - 3-08	Graigue-Ballycallan	St. Patrick's Park
	DJ Carey 3-2, J McDermott 1-1, J Fitzgerald 1-0, C Carter 0-2, C Fitzgerald 0-1, T Farrell 0-1.		D Byrne 1-3, A Ronan 1-1, J Teehan 1-0, N Maher 0-2, J Brennan 0-1, G Ronan 0-1.

9 October 1993 Semi-final	Tullaroan	1-15 - 2-08	Clara	St. Patrick's Park
	P Hennessy 1-4, D Gaffney 0-5, J Walton 0-3, S Dunne 0-1, B Hennessy 0-1, S Teehan 0-1.		P Barcoe 2-0, R Shortall 0-3, L Ryan 0-2, J Casey 0-1, A Prendergast 0-1, B Barcoe 0-1.

17 October 1993 Final	Graigue-Ballycallan	2-13 - 2-08	Clara	St. Patrick's Park
	A Ronan 1-8, D Cleere 1-3, J Teehan 0-1, M O'Brien 0-1.		JJ Ward 2-0, R Shortall 0-3, P Barcoe 0-2, L Ryan 0-1, J Casey 0-1, B Barcoe 0-1.

=== Quarter-finals ===
18 September 1993 Quarter-final	Mullinavat	2-07 - 0-12	St. Martin's	John Locke Park
	M Dunphy 1-3, W Carroll 0-2, S Walsh 0-1, R Carroll 0-1.		D Lawlor 0-7, E Morrissey 0-2, J Dooley 0-2, L Dowling 0-1.

19 September 1993 Quarter-final	Erin's Own	2-12 - 1-13	Ballyhale Shamrocks	Nowlan Park
	J Brennan 0-7, B Young 1-2, D O'Rourke 1-1, F Slevin 0-1, M Owens 0-1.		D Fennelly 1-1, J Shefflin 0-4, G Fennelly 0-3, B Aylward 0-2, L Fennelly 0-2, D Mason 0-1.

19 September 1994 Quarter-final	Dicksboro	3-10 - 1-12	James Stephens	Nowlan Park
	T Bawle 1-3, S Morrissey 1-0, J Treacy 1-0, S Prendergast 0-3, L Kerwick 0-2, M Kennedy 0-1, D O'Neill 0-1.		J O'Dwyer 1-3, B Leahy 0-3, N Kelly 0-2, R Manogue 0-2, P Barry 0-1, D Cowhig 0-1.

19 September 1993 Quarter-final	Fenians	2-15 - 0-16	Glenmore	Nowlan Park
	B Fitzpatrick 1-2, B Ryan 1-2, B Purcell 0-5, P McCormack 0-2, S Grehan 0-1, J Brennan 0-1, B Ryan 0-1, PJ Delaney 0-1.		R Heffernan 0-9, J Murphy 0-2, C Heffernan 0-2, S Dollard 0-1, P Barron 0-1, M 'Foxy' Phelan 0-1.

=== Semi-finals ===
10 October 1993 Semi-final	Dicksboro	4-11 - 0-09	Mullinavat	Nowlan Park
	S Morrissey 2-1, T Bawle 1-3, S Prendergast 1-2, D O'Neill 0-3, J Treacy 0-1, S Kennedy 0-1.		P McEvoy 0-6, J Walsh 0-1, S Walsh 0-1, W Carroll 0-1.

10 October 1993 Semi-final	Fenians	2-12 - 2-12	Erin's Own	Nowlan Park
	B Purcell 1-7, B Ryan 1-0, P McCormack 0-3, B Ryan 0-1, M Walsh 0-1.		J Brennan 0-7, B Young 1-2, C Brennan 1-0, F Slevin 0-2, E Brennan 0-1.

17 October 1993 Semi-final replay	Fenians	1-15 - 1-13	Erin's Own	Nowlan Park
	PJ Delaney 1-3, B Purcell 0-5, B Ryan 0-3, P McCormack 0-1, J Brennan 0-1, P Ryan 0-1, S Grehan 0-1.		J Brennan 1-8, J Buggy 0-1, E Holland 0-1, F Slevin 0-1, C Brennan 0-1, B Young 0-1.

=== Finals ===
24 October 1993 Final	Dicksboro	0-12 - 0-12	Fenians	Nowlan Park
	T Bawle 0-6, D O'Neill 0-4, J Treacy 0-1, S Morrissey 0-1.		B Purcell 0-5, J Brennan 0-3, G Brennan 0-1, S Grehan 0-1, B Ryan 0-1, P McCormack 0-1.	Referee: D Cody (Graignamanagh)

7 November 1993 Final replay	Dicksboro	2-09 - 1-09	Fenians	Nowlan Park
	S Morrissey 1-2, J Treacy 1-0, T Bawle 0-2, L Kerwick 0-2, S Moore 0-1, S Kennedy 0-1, D O'Neill 0-1.		B Ryan 1-1, B Purcell 0-2, B Ryan 0-2, P McCormack 0-1, S Grehan 0-1, PJ Delaney 0-1, J Brennan 0-1.	Referee: D Cody (Graignamanagh)

== Championship statistics ==
=== Top scorers ===
Overall

Rank	Player	County	Tally	Total	Matches	Average
1	Adrian Ronan	Graigue-Ballycallan	5-12	27	3	9.00
1	Billy Purcell	Fenians	1-24	27	5	5.20
2	Jamesie Brennan	Erin's Own	1-22	25	3	8.33
3	Tommy Bawle	Dicksboro	2-18	24	5	4.80
4	Sam Morrissey	Dicksboro	5-06	21	5	4.20
5	D. J. Carey	Young Irelands	3-01	19	2	9.50

Single game

Rank	Player	County	Tally	Total	Opposition
1	Adrian Ronan	Graigue-Ballycallan	3-03	12	Glenmore
2	D. J. Carey	Young Irelands	3-02	11	Graigue-Ballycallan
2	Adrian Ronan	Graigue-Ballycallan	1-08	11	Clara
2	Jamesie Brennan	Erin's Own	1-08	11	Fenians
3	Billy Purcell	Fenians	1-07	10	Erin's Own
4	Ray Heffernan	Glenmore	0-09	9	Fenians
5	D. J. Carey	Young Irelands	0-08	8	Dicksboro
