= Peter Smith (hurler) =

Irish hurler

Personal information
- Native name: Peadar Mac Gabhann (Irish)
- Born: 1972 (age 53–54) Midleton; County Cork, Ireland
- Occupation: Process operator

Sport
- Sport: Hurling
- Position: Left wing-back
Club
- Years: Club
- Midleton
Club titles
- Cork titles: 1
College titles
- Fitzgibbon titles: 0
Inter-county
Years	County	Apps (scores)
1995-1997	Cork	2 (0-00)
Inter-county titles
- Munster titles: 0
- All-Irelands: 0
- NHL: 0
- All Stars: 0

Peter Smith (born 1972) is an Irish hurling manager and former player. At club level, he played with Midleton and at inter-county level with the Cork senior hurling team.

== Playing career ==
Smith played hurling at all grades as a student at Midleton CBS. He was part of the school's senior team that lost to Abbey CBS in the final of the Dean Ryan Cup in 1987. Smith later won a Dr Harty Cup medal after a 2–07 to 2–03 win over Thurles CBS in 1988.

At club level, Smith first played for Midleton at juvenile and underage levels. He won three successive Cork MAHC medals, while also claiming consecutive Cork U21AHC medals. Smith won a Cork SHC in 1991 after a 1–17 to 1–08 win over Glen Rovers.

Smith first played for Cork at inter-county level during a three-year tenure with the minor team. He won Munster MHC medals in 1988 and 1990, as well as captaining the team to a 1–09 to 0–09 defeat by Kilkenny in the 1990 All-Ireland minor final. Smith later progressed to the under-21 team and won Munster U21HC medals in 1991 and 1993. Smith subsequently spent three seasons with the senior team.

== Management career ==
Smith became involved in team management and coaching following his retirement from playing. He managed Midleton to the Cork SHC title in 2013 after a 2–15 to 2–13 win over Sarsfields. Smith later managed Cloyne.

== Honours ==
=== Player ===
Midleton CBS

- Dr Harty Cup: 1988

Midleton

- Cork Senior Hurling Championship: 1991
- Cork Under-21 Hurling Championship: 1988, 1989
- Cork Minor Hurling Championship: 1987, 1988, 1989

Cork

- Munster Under-21 Hurling Championship: 1991, 1993
- Munster Minor Hurling Championship: 1988, 1990 (c)

=== Management ===
Midleton

- Cork Senior Hurling Championship: 2013
