= 1982 All-Ireland Senior Hurling Championship =

Championship details
- Dates: 30 May – 5 September 1982
- Teams: 13

All-Ireland champions
- Winning team: Kilkenny (22nd win)
- Captain: Brian Cody
- Manager: Pat Henderson

All-Ireland Finalists
- Losing team: Cork
- Captain: Jimmy Barry-Murphy
- Manager: Gerald McCarthy

Provincial champions
- Munster: Cork
- Leinster: Kilkenny
- Ulster: Not Played
- Connacht: Not Played

Championship statistics
- No. matches played: 13
- Goals total: 62 (4.76 per game)
- Points total: 385 (29.61 per game)
- Player of the Year: Noel Skehan
- All-Star Team: See here

The All-Ireland Senior Hurling Championship of 1982 was the 96th staging of Ireland's premier hurling knock-out competition. Kilkenny won the championship, beating Cork 3–18 to 1–13 in the final at Croke Park, Dublin.

== Teams ==
=== General information ===
Thirteen counties will compete in the All-Ireland Senior Hurling Championship: one team from the Connacht Senior Hurling Championship, six teams in the Leinster Senior Hurling Championship, five teams in the Munster Senior Hurling Championship and one team from the All-Ireland Senior B Hurling Championship.

| County | Last provincial title | Last championship title | Position in 1981 Championship | Current championship |
|---|---|---|---|---|
| Antrim | 1946 | — | | All-Ireland Senior B Hurling Championship |
| Clare | 1932 | 1914 | | Munster Senior Hurling Championship |
| Cork | 1979 | 1978 | | Munster Senior Hurling Championship |
| Dublin | 1961 | 1938 | | Leinster Senior Hurling Championship |
| Galway | 1922 | 1980 | | Leinster Senior Hurling Championship |
| Kilkenny | 1979 | 1979 | | Leinster Senior Hurling Championship |
| Laois | 1949 | 1915 | | Leinster Senior Hurling Championship |
| Limerick | 1981 | 1973 | | Munster Senior Hurling Championship |
| Offaly | 1981 | 1981 | | Leinster Senior Hurling Championship |
| Tipperary | 1971 | 1971 | | Munster Senior Hurling Championship |
| Waterford | 1963 | 1959 | | Munster Senior Hurling Championship |
| Westmeath | — | — | | Leinster Senior Hurling Championship |
| Wexford | 1977 | 1968 | | Leinster Senior Hurling Championship |

== Format ==
=== Leinster championship ===
Quarter-finals: (2 matches) These are two lone matches between the first four teams drawn from the province of Leinster. Two teams are eliminated at this stage, while two teams advance to the semi-finals.

Semi-finals: (2 matches) The winners of the two quarter-finals join two other Leinster teams to make up the semi-final pairings. Two teams are eliminated at this stage, while two teams advance to the final.

Final: (1 match) The winners of the two semi-finals contest this game. One team is eliminated at this stage, while the winners advance to the All-Ireland semi-final.

=== Munster championship ===
Quarter-final: (1 match) This is a lone match between the first two teams drawn from the province of Munster. One team is eliminated at this stage, while the winners advance to the semi-finals.

Semi-finals: (2 matches) The winners of the lone quarter-final join the other three Munster teams to make up the semi-final pairings. Two teams are eliminated at this stage, while two teams advance to the final.

Final: (1 match) The winners of the two semi-finals contest this game. One team is eliminated at this stage, while the winners advance directly to the All-Ireland final.

=== All-Ireland Championship ===
Quarter-final: (1 match) This is a lone match between Galway and the All-Ireland 'B' champions. One team is eliminated at this stage, while the winners advance to the All-Ireland semi-final where they play the Leinster champions.

Semi-final: (1 match) This is a lone match between the winners of the All-Ireland quarter-final and the Leinster champions. One team is eliminated at this stage, while the winners advance to the All-Ireland final.

Final: (1 match) The winners of the lone semi-final winners will play the Munster champions in the All-Ireland final.

== Provincial championships ==
=== Leinster Senior Hurling Championship ===
30 May 1982
Quarter-Final

| Offaly | 2–16 – 3–12 | Wexford |
|---|---|---|
| P. Horan (1–7), B. Bermingham (1–0), M. Corrigan (0–2), P. Kirwan (0–2), P. Carroll (0–2), P. Delaney (0–1), J. Flaherty (0–1), J. Kelly (0–1). | | S. Kinsella (1–3), C. Doran (1–1), M. Quigley (1–1), J. Murphy (0–2), M. Jacob (0–2), G. O'Connor (0–2), N. Buggy (0–1). |

Croke Park, Dublin

30 May 1982
Quarter-Final

| Westmeath | 2–12 – 2–11 | Dublin |
|---|---|---|
| M. Ryan (2–6), J. J. Lynch (0–2), M. Cosgrave (0–2), P. Delton (0–1), E. Gallagher (0–1). | | G. Hayes (0–7), J. Cunningham (1–2), M. Morris (1–1), P. McLoughlin (0–1). |

Croke Park, Dublin

20 June 1982
Semi-Final

| Offaly | 3–14 – 3–14 | Laois |
|---|---|---|
| P. Horan (2–2), J. Flaherty (1–3), P. Carroll (0–3), P. Delaney (0–1), A. Fogarty (0–1), J. Kelly (0–1), L. Currams (0–1), B. Bermingham (0–1), M. Corrigan (0–1). | | H. Bohane (0–5), P. Critchley (1–1), P. J. Cuddy (1–0), M. Cuddy (1–0), C. Jones (0–3), M. Walsh (0–2), M. Brophy (0–2), E. Fennelly (0–1). |

Croke Park, Dublin

20 June 1982
Semi-Final

| Kilkenny | 7–31 – 0–13 | Westmeath |
|---|---|---|
| B. Fitzpatrick (2–7), L. Fennelly (1–4), C. Heffernan (1–3), G. Fennelly (1–3), B. Purcell (0–6), R. Power (1–2), J. Hennessy (1–2), M. Ruth (0–1), T. McCormack (0–1), P. Lennon (0–1), F. Cummins (0–1). | | M. Cosgrave (0–6), J. J. Lynch (0–2), J. Fitzsimons (0–2), M. Ryan (0–1), D. Kilcoyne (0–1), P. Dalton (0–1). |

Croke Park, Dublin

11 July 1982
Semi-Final
Replay

| Offaly | 2–17 – 0–14 | Laois |
|---|---|---|
| P. Horan (2–5), J. Flaherty (0–3), M. Corrigan (0–3), B. Bermingham (0–2), P. Carroll (0–1), A. Fogarty (0–1), L. Currams (0–1), P. Kirwan (0–1). | | M. Walshe (0–6), M. Brophy (0–3), C. Jones (0–2), P. Critchley (0–1), E. Fennelly (0–1), M. Cuddy (0–1). |

Croke Park, Dublin

25 July 1982
Final

| Kilkenny | 1–11 – 0–12 | Offaly |
|---|---|---|
| B. Fitzpatrick (0–5), L. Fennelly (1–0), K. Brennan (0–1), M. Ruth (0–1), J. Hennessy (0–1), F. Cummins (0–1), G. Fennelly (0–1), R. Power (0–1). | | P. Horan (0–3), J. Flaherty (0–3), L. Currams (0–2), M. Corrigan (0–1), P. Kirwan (0–1), P. Delaney (0–1), J. Kelly (0–1). |

Croke Park, Dublin

=== Munster Senior Hurling Championship ===
30 May 1982
Quarter-Final

| Cork | 1–19 – 2–8 | Tipperary |
|---|---|---|
| T. O'Sullivan (0–7), J. Barry-Murphy (1–3), P. Horgan (0–3), T. Cashman (0–2), T. Crowley (0–2), S. O'Leary (0–1), B. Murphy (0–1). | | N. O'Dwyer (1–1), M. McGrath (1–0), P. McGrath (0–3), P. Fox (0–1), N. English (0–1), B. Carroll (0–1), B. Ryan (0–1). |

Páirc Uí Chaoimh, Cork

13 June 1982
Semi-Final

| Waterford | 2–14 – 2–13 | Limerick |
|---|---|---|
| P. Curran (1–2), J. Greene (0–5), S. Broon (1–1), E. Nolan (0–2), T. Casey (0–2), P. Bennett (0–1), P. McGrath (0–1). | | E. Cregan (1–4), J. McKenna (1–1), J. Flanagan (0–4), O. O'Connor (0–2), D. Murray (0–1), M. Grimes (0–1). |

Semple Stadium, Thurles

20 June 1982
Semi-Final

| Cork | 3–19 – 2–6 | Clare |
|---|---|---|
| K. Hennessy (2–1), T. O'Sullivan (0–7), S. O'Leary (1–1), J. Fenton (0–2), T. Crowley (0–2), B. Óg Murphy (0–2), T. Cashman (0–2), J. Barry-Murphy (0–1), P. Horgan (0–1). | | V. Donnellan (1–1), G. McInerney (1–0), J. Callinan (0–2), P. Russell (0–2), S. Fitzpatrick (0–1). |

Semple Stadium, Thurles

18 July 1982
Final

| Cork | 5–31 – 3–6 | Waterford |
|---|---|---|
| S. O'Leary (4–0), T. O'Sullivan (0–12), P. Horgan (0–9), R. Cummins (1–2), J. Barry-Murphy (0–3), E. O'Donoghue (0–3), J. Fenton (0–2). | | T. Casey (1–2), J. Greene (1–0), M. Whelan (1–0), P. Bennett (0–3), M. Walsh (0–1). |

Semple Stadium, Thurles

== All-Ireland Senior Hurling Championship ==
| Quarter-finals | | Semi-finals | | Final |
| Galway | 6–19 |
| Antrim | 3–12 | Kilkenny | 2–20 |
| | | Galway | 2–10 |
| | | | | Kilkenny | 3–18 |
| | | | | Cork | 1–13 |

=== All-Ireland quarter-finals ===
18 July 1982
Quarter-Final

| Galway | 6–19 – 3–12 | Antrim |
|---|---|---|
| P. J. Molloy (2–9), N. Lane (2–3), B. Lynskey (1–1), J. Connolly (1–1), P. Murphy (0–3), M. Connolly (0–1), S. Mahon (0–1). | | P. McFaul (2–2), B. Donnelly (1–3), P. Boyle (0–4), J. McLean (0–1), B. Laverty (0–1), P. McIlhatton (0–1). |

Croke Park, Dublin

=== All-Ireland semi-finals ===
8 August 1982
Semi-Final

| Kilkenny | 2–20 – 2–10 | Galway |
|---|---|---|
| R. Power (1–3), B. Fitzpatrick (0–6), K. Brennan (0–4), L. Fennelly (1–0), C. Heffernan (0–3), G. Fennelly (0–3), N. Skehan (0–1). | | P. J. Molloy (1–2), M. Connolly (1–0), N. Lane (0–3), S. Mahon (0–2), J. Connolly (0–2), S. Linnane (0–1). |

Croke Park, Dublin

=== All-Ireland Final ===
5 September 1982
Final

| Kilkenny | 3–18 – 1–13 | Cork |
|---|---|---|
| C. Heffernan (2–3), B. Fitzpatrick (0–6), G. Fennelly (1–1), R. Power (0–4), L. Fennelly (0–2), J. Hennessy (0–1), K. Brennan (0–1). | | P. Horgan (0–5), E. O'Donoghue (1–0), R. Cummins (0–3), T. Crowley (0–2), T. O'Sullivan (0–2), T. Cashman (0–1). |

Croke Park, Dublin
Attendance: 59,550
Referee: N. O'Donoghue (Dublin)

| Kilkenny | Cork |

== Championship statistics ==
=== Scoring ===
- Widest winning margin: 39 points
  - Kilkenny 7–31 : 0–13 Westmeath (Leinster semi-final)
- Most goals in a match: 9
  - Galway 6–19 : 3–12 Antrim (All-Ireland semi-final)
- Most points in a match: 44
  - Kilkenny 7–31 : 0–13 Westmeath (Leinster semi-final)
- Most goals by one team in a match: 7
  - Kilkenny 7–31 : 0–13 Westmeath (Leinster semi-final)
- Most goals scored by a losing team: 3
  - Wexford 3–12 : 2–16 Offaly (Leinster quarter-final)
  - Waterford 3–6 : 5–31 Cork (Munster final)
  - Antrim 3–12 : 6–19 Galway (All-Ireland semi-final)
- Most points scored by a losing team: 14
  - Laois 0–14 : 2–17 Offaly (Leinster semi-final replay)

=== Overall ===
- Most goals scored – Kilkenny (13)
- Most goals conceded – Cork (10)

== Miscellaneous ==
- In the Leinster semi-final Kilkenny scored 7–31 against Westmeath, it was the first time more than thirty points were scored over the bar in a seventy minutes championship match.
- Cork's 31-point defeat of Waterford in the Munster final is a record which still stands.

== Top scorers ==
=== Season ===
| Rank | Player | County | Tally | Total | Matches | Average |
|---|---|---|---|---|---|---|
| 1 | Pádraig Horan | Offaly | 5–17 | 32 | 4 | 8.00 |
| 2 | Billy Fitzpatrick | Kilkenny | 2–24 | 30 | 4 | 7.50 |
| 3 | Tony O'Sullivan | Cork | 0–28 | 28 | 4 | 7.00 |
| 4 | P. J. Molloy | Galway | 3–11 | 20 | 2 | 10.00 |
| 5 | Christy Heffernan | Kilkenny | 3–9 | 18 | 4 | 4.50 |
| 5 | Pat Horgan | Cork | 0–18 | 18 | 4 | 4.50 |
| 7 | Seánie O'Leary | Cork | 5–2 | 17 | 4 | 4.25 |
| 8 | Richie Power | Kilkenny | 2–10 | 16 | 4 | 4.00 |
| 9 | Liam Fennelly | Kilkenny | 3–6 | 15 | 4 | 3.75 |
| 10 | Ger Fennelly | Kilkenny | 2–8 | 14 | 4 | 3.50 |

=== Single game ===
| Rank | Player | County | Tally | Total | Opposition |
|---|---|---|---|---|---|
| 1 | P. J. Molloy | Galway | 2–9 | 15 | Antrim |
| 1 | Billy Fitzpatrick | Kilkenny | 2–7 | 13 | Westmeath |
| 3 | Seánie O'Leary | Cork | 4–0 | 12 | Waterford |
| 3 | Michael Ryan | Westmeath | 2–6 | 12 | Dublin |
| 3 | Tony O'Sullivan | Cork | 0–12 | 12 | Waterford |
| 6 | Pádraig Horan | Offaly | 2–5 | 11 | Laois |
| 7 | Pádraig Horan | Offaly | 1–7 | 10 | Wexford |
| 8 | Noel Lane | Galway | 2–3 | 9 | Antrim |
| 8 | Christy Heffernan | Kilkenny | 2–3 | 9 | Cork |
| 8 | Pat Horgan | Cork | 0–9 | 9 | Waterford |

== Broadcasting ==
The following matches were broadcast live on television in Ireland on RTÉ.

| Round | RTÉ |
|---|---|
| All-Ireland semi-final | Kilkenny vs Galway |
| All-Ireland final | Kilkenny vs Cork |
