= Alan Connolly (hurler) =

Irish hurler (born 2001)

Personal information
- Native name: Ailéon Ó Conghaile (Irish)
- Born: 19 July 2001 (age 25) Blackrock, Cork, Ireland
- Occupation: Account handler
- Height: 6 ft 1 in (185 cm)

Sport
- Sport: Hurling
- Position: Full-forward
Club*
Years	Club	Apps (scores)
2019–present	Blackrock	23 (16–155)
Club titles
- Cork titles: 1
College
- Years: College
- 2020–2025: MTU Cork
College titles
- Fitzgibbon titles: 0
Inter-county**
Years	County	Apps (scores)
2020–present	Cork	30 (13-82)
Inter-county titles
- Munster titles: 1
- All-Irelands: 0
- NHL: 1
- All Stars: 0
- * club appearances and scores correct as of 21:08, 8 October 2024. **Inter County team apps and scores correct as of 20:40, 5 July 2026.

Alan Connolly (born 19 July 2001) is an Irish hurler. At club level he plays with Blackrock and at inter-county level with the Cork senior hurling team. He usually lines out at full-forward.

== Early life ==
Born and raised in Blackrock, Connolly first played hurling to a high standard as a student at St Francis College in Rochestown. He progressed through the various age grades before joining the school's senior team. Connolly was top scorer with 0-07 when St Francis College beat Hamilton High School by 1–13 to 0–14 to claim the Munster PPS SBHC title. He was a Dr O'Callaghan Cup runner-up in February 2020 after a 3–24 to 1–15 defeat by Midleton CBS, in what was his last game for Rochestown College. Connolly later studied at Munster Technological University Cork and was added to their Fitzgibbon Cup panel in 2023.

== Club career ==
Connolly began his club career at juvenile and underage levels with the Blackrock club, before progressing to the club's senior team. He made his championship debut in a 1–25 to 2–16 defeat by Newtownshandrum in August 2019. Connolly won a Cork SHC medal in October 2020 after top-scoring with 0–13 in the 4–26 to 4-18 extra-time defeat of Glen Rovers in the final. He also claimed the man of the match award and was the championship's top scorer with 5-52.

== Inter-county career ==
Connolly first played for Cork as a member of the minor team during their unsuccessful Munster MHC campaign in 2018. After a year with no inter-county activity, he joined Cork's under-20 team in 2020. Success in this grade was immediate with Connolly claiming Munster and All-Ireland U20HC medals in 2020 after respective defeats of Tipperary and Dublin.

Connolly had one more year of under-20 hurling, however, his inclusion on the senior team in 2021, after being an unused substitute the previous year, made him ineligible for the grade. He made his senior debut in May 2021 when he scored two goals after coming on as a substitute for Shane Barrett in a 5–22 to 1–27 National Hurling League defeat of Waterford. Connolly was part of the matchday panel when Cork suffered a 3–32 to 1–22 defeat by Limerick in the 2021 All-Ireland final.

Connolly was at full-forward when Cork lost the 2022 National League final to Waterford. He missed the entire 2023 season with a shoulder injury, before a hamstring injury further delayed his return.

== Personal life ==
Connolly's uncles, Tom and Jim Cashman, won six All-Ireland SHC medals between them with Cork between 1977 and 1990. His grandfather, Mick Cashman, was a substitute on Cork's 1952–1954 three-in-a-row team, while his granduncle, Jimmy Brohan, also lined out with that team.

== Career statistics ==
=== Club ===
As of 6 September 2026

Team	Year	Cork PSHC	
Team	Year	Apps	Score
Blackrock	2019	1	0-01
Blackrock	2020	6	5-52
Blackrock	2021	5	5-31
Blackrock	2022	6	1-39
Blackrock	2023	0	0-00
Blackrock	2024	5	5-32
Blackrock	2025	4	1-31
Blackrock	2026	3	2-23
Career total		30	19-209

=== Inter-county ===
As of 4 July 2026

Team	Year	National League			Munster		All-Ireland		Total	
Team	Year	Division	Apps	Score	Apps	Score	Apps	Score	Apps	Score
Cork	2020	Division 1A	0	0-00	0	0-00	0	0-00	0	0-00
Cork	2021	Division 1A	5	4-02	1	0-00	2	0-02	8	4-04
Cork	2022	Division 1A	5	1-05	3	4-02	2	0-02	10	5-09
Cork	2023	Division 1A	0	0-00	0	0-00	—		0	0-00
Cork	2024	Division 1A	3	6-04	4	4-09	4	0-04	11	10-17
Cork	2025	Division 1A	3	1-03	5	1-07	2	3-03	10	5-13
Cork	2026	Division 1A	6	1-36	5	1-42	2	0-11	13	2-89
Total			22	13-50	18	10-60	12	3-22	52	26-132

== Honours ==
St Francis College

- Munster PPS Under-19 B Hurling Championship: 2019

Blackrock

- Cork Premier Senior Hurling Championship: 2020

Cork

- Munster Senior Hurling Championship: 2025
- National Hurling League: 2025
- All-Ireland Under-20 Hurling Championship: 2020
- Munster Under-20 Hurling Championship: 2020
