= 1982 All-Ireland Under-21 Hurling Championship =

All-Ireland Under-21 Hurling Championship 1982
Championship Details
- Dates: 23 April 1982 - 12 September 1982
- Teams: 14

All Ireland Champions
- Winners: Cork (8th win)
- Captain: Martin McCarthy

All Ireland Runners-up
- Runners-up: Galway
- Captain: Pierce Piggott

Provincial Champions
- Munster: Cork
- Leinster: Kilkenny
- Ulster: Antrim
- Connacht: Not Played

Championship Statistics
- Matches Played: 15
- Top Scorer: Tony O'Sullivan (3-22)

The 1982 All-Ireland Under-21 Hurling Championship was the 19th staging of the All-Ireland Under-21 Hurling Championship since its establishment by the Gaelic Athletic Association in 1964. The championship began on 23 April 1982 and ended on 12 September 1982.

Tipperary entered the championship as the defending champions, however, they were beaten by Limerick in the Munster semi-final.

On 12 September 1982, Cork won the championship following a 0-12 to 0-11 defeat of Galway in the All-Ireland final. This was their eighth All-Ireland title overall and their first title since 1976.

Cork's Tony O'Sullivan was the championship's top scorer with 3-22.

== Results ==
=== Leinster Under-21 Hurling Championship ===
Quarter-finals

2 June 1982 Quarter-final	Wexford	0-18 - 2-12	Kilkenny	Bellefield Road
	John Codd 0-9, M Fitzhenry 0-3, E Cleary 0-3, D Murphy 0-2, P Crean 0-1.		J Murphy 2-2, B Walton 0-5, M Collins 0-2, B Purcell 0-2, P Ryan 0-1.

6 June 1982 Quarter-final	Offaly	3-15 - 1-04	Westmeath	O'Connor Park
	M Coughlan 2-0 P Cleary 1-2, J Dooley 0-5, B Colclough 0-4, A Rosney 0-3, P Corrigan 0-1.		M Farrelly 1-0, M Daly 0-3, G Gillen 0-1.

16 June 1982 Quarter-final replay	Kilkenny	3-20 - 1-09	Wexford	Nowlan Park
	B Walton 0-9, B Purcell 1-5, L McCarthy 2-0, M Collins 0-2, M Byrne 0-1, P Ryan 0-1, J Ryan 0-1, J McDonald 0-1.		J Codd 0-5, E Cleary 1-1, G Cody 0-1, T Morrissey 0-1, M Fitzhenry 0-1.

Semi-finals

23 June 1982 Semi-final	Offaly	4-13 - 3-07	Dublin	Geraldine Park
	P Cleary 3-2, B Coakley 1-0, J Dooley 0-3, J Connell 0-2, K McLoughlin 0-2, P Corrigan 0-1, M Coughlan 0-1, S Coughlan 0-1, A Rosney 0-1.		T Conroy 1-2, L Byrne 1-0, J Twomey 1-0, L Eustace 0-3, S Walsh 0-1, P McLoughlin 0-1.

23 June 1982 Semi-final	Kilkenny	3-20 - 1-06	Laois	Dr. Cullen Park
	L McCarthy 2-1, B Purcell 1-3, B Walton 0-6, MJ Ryan 0-6, R Heffernan 0-2, M Byrne 0-2.		C Hyland 1-3, M Drennan 0-1, S Murphy 0-1, D Healy 0-1.	Referee: M Kelleher (Kildare)

Final

17 July 1982 Final	Kilkenny	5-20 - 2-06	Offaly	Dr. Cullen Park
	B Purcell 2-2, B Walton 0-8, MJ Ryan 1-3, L McCarthy 1-2, M Byrne 1-1, R Heffernan 0-2, J Murphy 0-2.		P Cleary 1-1, P Corrigan 1-1, J Dooley 0-3.	Referee: J Bailey (Dublin)

=== Munster Under-21 Hurling Championship ===
First round

23 April 1982 First round	Limerick	1-11 - 0-10	Clare	Gaelic Grounds
	T Burke 0-6, Paul O'Connor 1-1, A Garry 0-3, T Hall 0-1.		G McInerney 0-6, M Deasy 0-1, S Fitzpatrick 0-1, N Earley 0-1, V Donnelly 0-1.

1 May 1982 First round	Waterford	3-13 - 2-06	Kerry	Fraher Field
	K Delahunty 1-3, P Curley 1-1, M Walsh 1-0, J Warren 0-3, N Crowley 0-2, P Bennett 0-2, K Heffernan 0-1, A Cooney 0-1.		M Burke 0-5, P O'Mahony 1-1, B Dunne 1-0.

Semi-final

5 May 1982 Semi-final	Cork	3-12 - 1-13	Waterford	Youghal
	T O'Sullivan 1-6, T Coyne 0-5, T Finn 1-0, K White 1-0, D Curtin 0-1.		P Ryan 0-5, P Curley 1-0, K Delahunty 0-3, J Warren 0-2, M Walsh 0-1, A Cooney 0-1, N Crowley 0-1.	Referee: W Carroll (Tipperary)

25 June 1982 Semi-final	Limerick	2-12 - 1-07	Tipperary	Gaelic Grounds
	P Howard 2-2, A Garvey 0-3, T Burke 0-3, T Kenny 0-2, D Fitzgerald 0-1, P O'Connor 0-1.		W Peters 1-1, P McGrath 0-2, J Browne 0-1, M McGrath 0-1, C O'Donovan 0-1, N English 0-1.

Final

28 July 1982 Final	Limerick	1-04 - 1-14	Cork	FitzGerald Park, Kilmallock
	T Kenny 1-0, P Howard 0-2, G Magner 0-1, D Fitzgerald 0-1.		T O'Sullivan 0-5, E Brosnan 1-1, D Curtin 0-2, D Walsh 0-2, T Coyne 0-2, T Finn 0-1, K Hennessy 0-1.

=== Ulster Under-21 Hurling Championship ===
Final

24 July 1982 Final	Antrim	9-14 - 4-05	Down	Casement Park
	T McNaughton 2-4, A McCarry 2-4, S Quinn 2-0, R Hyndman 0-5, S Caldwell 1-1, M Coyle 1-0, M Smart 1-0.		P Blaney 2-0, V Finnegan 1-0, S Bannon 1-0, G Coyle 0-3, C McKean 0-1, K O'Neill 0-1.

=== All-Ireland Under-21 Hurling Championship ===
Semi-finals

1 August 1982 Semi-final	Cork	4-21 - 1-10	Antrim	Páirc Tailteann
	T O'Sullivan 2-7, T Coyne 1-2, K Hennessy 0-5, T Finn 1-0, T Hartnett 0-3, N Brosnan 0-2, D Scanlon 0-1, D Walsh 0-1.		R Hyndman 0-6, P Carey 1-0, A McNaughton 0-1, S Caldwell 0-1, M Coyles 0-1, S Quinn 0-1.

15 August 1982 Semi-final	Galway	1-13 - 1-10	Kilkenny	Cusack Park
	M Haverty 0-6, P Murphy 0-4, J Murphy 1-0, T Keady 0-1, M McGrath 0-1, N Morrissey 0-1.		B Purcell 1-1, J Kinsella 0-3, L McCarthy 0-2, MJ Ryan 0-2, B Walton 0-1, M Byrne 0-1.	Referee: S O'Meara (Tipperary)

Final

12 September 1982 Final	Cork	0-12 - 0-11	Galway	St. Brendan's Park
	T O'Sullivan 0-4, D Walsh 0-2, T Coyne 0-2, K Hennessy 0-2, M O'Sullivan 0-1, N Brosnan 0-1.		M Haverty 0-5, P Murphy 0-3, J Murphy 0-2, M McGrath 0-1.	Referee: G Kirwan (Offaly)

== Championship statistics ==
=== Top scorers ===
Top scorers overall

Rank	Player	County	Tally	Total	Matches	Average
1	Tony O'Sullivan	Cork	3-22	31	4	7.75
2	Billy Walton	Kilkenny	0-29	29	5	5.80
3	Billy Purcell	Kilkenny	5-13	28	5	5.60
4	Pat Cleary	Offaly	5-05	20	3	6.66
4	Liam McCarthy	Kilkenny	5-05	20	5	4.00
5	John Murphy	Kilkenny	3-06	15	5	3.00

Top scorers in a single game

Rank	Player	Club	Tally	Total	Opposition
1	Tony O'Sullivan	Cork	2-07	13	Antrim
2	Pat Cleary	Offaly	3-02	11	Dublin
3	Aidan McCarry	Antrim	2-04	10	Down
3	Terence McNaughton	Antrim	2-04	10	Down
4	Tony O'Sullivan	Cork	1-06	9	Waterford
4	John Codd	Wexford	0-09	9	Kilkenny
4	Billy Walton	Kilkenny	0-09	9	Wexford
5	Billy Purcell	Kilkenny	2-02	8	Offaly
5	Pat Howard	Limerick	2-02	8	Tipperary
5	John Murphy	Kilkenny	2-02	8	Wexford
5	Billy Purcell	Kilkenny	1-05	8	Wexford
5	Billy Walton	Kilkenny	0-08	8	Offaly
