= 1991 All-Ireland Minor Hurling Championship =

European field sports competition

All-Ireland Minor Hurling Championship 1991
Championship Details
- Dates: 16 April 1991 - 1 September 1991
- Teams: 16

All Ireland Champions
- Winners: Kilkenny (15th win)
- Captain: Dan O'Neill

All Ireland Runners-up
- Runners-up: Tipperary
- Captain: Adrian Hogan

Provincial Champions
- Munster: Tipperary
- Leinster: Kilkenny
- Ulster: Derry
- Connacht: Not Played

Championship Statistics
- Matches Played: 15
- Top Scorer: P. J. Delaney (2-29)

The 1991 All-Ireland Minor Hurling Championship was the 61st staging of the All-Ireland Minor Hurling Championship since its establishment by the Gaelic Athletic Association in 1928. The championship began on 16 April 1991 and ended on 1 September 1991.

Kilkenny entered the championship as the defending champions.

On 1 September 1991, Kilkenny won the championship following a 0-15 to 1-10 defeat of Tipperary in the All-Ireland final. This was their second All-Ireland title in-a-row and their 14th title overall.

Kilkenny's P. J. Delaney was the championship's top scorer with 2-29.

== Results ==
=== Leinster Senior Hurling Championship ===
First round

22 May 1991 First round	Laois	6-16 - 3-06	Carlow	Geraldine Park, Athy
	D Rooney 2-1, S Kennedy 1-3, E Cashin 0-6, D Cuddy 1-2, B McEvoy 1-1, W McEvoy 1-0, B Dollard 0-2, D Delaney 0-1.		N English 2-0, J O'Toole 1-0, D Sheehan 0-3, B Murphy 0-2, A Doyle 0-1.

26 May 1991 First round	Offaly	3-09 - 0-09	Wexford	Nowlan Park, Kilkenny
	N Claffey 1-4, K Clements 1-0, J Grennan 1-0, C McGlone 0-1, K Martin 0-1, K Claffey 0-1, S Tooher 0-1, M Rigney 0-1.		T Galway 0-4, J Byrne 0-2, P Finn 0-2, M Byrne 0-1.

Semi-finals

29 June 1991 Semi-final	Kilkenny	2-13 - 1-08	Offaly	O'Moore Park, Portlaoise
	PJ Delaney 2-8, J Brennan 0-1, S Dollard 0-1, N Larkin 0-1, D Byrne 0-1, B Maher 0-1.		N Claffey 1-3, J Dooley 0-3, K Martin 0-1, R Quegan 0-1.

3 July 1991 Semi-final	Laois	3-11 - 1-12	Dublin	Geraldine Park, Athy
	S Kennedy 2-4, D Rooney 1-3, D Delaney 0-2, E Cashin 0-1, F Sullivan 0-1.		E Burke 0-8, A O'Donoghue 1-1, J O'Riordan 0-1, J Small 0-1, S Perkins 0-1.

Final

21 July 1991 Final	Kilkenny	1-20 - 0-04	Laois	Croke Park, Dublin
	PJ Delaney 0-8, D O'Neill 0-4, R Shortall 1-0, S Dollard 0-3, G Walsh 0-2, D Maher 0-2, P Larkin 0-1.		D Delaney 0-2, S Kennedy 0-1, W McEvoy 0-1.	Referee: P Horan (Offaly)

=== Munster Minor Hurling Championship ===
First round

16 April 1991 First round	Kerry	0-05 - 6-19	Cork	John Joe O'Sullivan Park, Ballyheigue
	J Dooley 0-2, T O'Leary 0-1, JJ Canty 0-1, B O'Sullivan 0-1.		O Farrell 3-2, R O'Connell 1-7, R Dwane 2-2, D O'Mahony 0-3, C Quirke 0-3, B Corcoran 0-1, J Collins 0-1.	Referee: S McMahon (Clare)

17 April 1991 First round	Clare	2-11 - 0-05	Waterford	Seán Treacy Park, Tipperary
	C Lynch 1-3, B Keating 1-1, R O'Hara 0-2, M O'Gorman 0-2, D Kirby 0-2, D Murphy 0-1.		T Browne 0-5.	Referee: M Doyle (Tipperary)

Semi-finals

1 May 1991 Semi-final	Tipperary	2-09 - 1-07	Cork	Gaelic Grounds, Limerick
	A Hogan 1-2, T Dunne 0-4, T Fogarty 1-0, B O'Meara 0-2, G Maguire 0-1.		R Dwane 1-0, R O'Connell 0-3, D O'Mahony 0-1, B Gleeson 0-1, A McCarthy 0-1.

2 May 1991 Semi-final	Clare	2-05 - 2-06	Limerick	Cusack Park, Ennis
	M O'Gorman 1-3, D Kirby 1-0, S McMahon 0-1, N Moloney 0-1.		TJ Ryan 1-0, K Roche 1-0, C Coughlan 0-2, A Browne 0-1, M Wallace 0-1, D O'Grady 0-1, M Roche 0-1.

Final

7 July 1991 Final	Tipperary	3-13 - 1-05	Limerick	Páirc Uí Chaoimh, Cork
	L Barrett 3-1, T Dunne 0-7, T Fogarty 0-3, A Hogan 0-1, T Moloney 0-1.		A Browne 1-0, M Wallace 0-3, D O'Grady 0-1, S Roche 0-1.	Referee: W Horgan (Cork)

=== Ulster Senior Hurling Championship ===
Semi-final

23 June 1991 Semi-final	Derry	4-14 - 1-07	Down	Casement Park, Belfast
	M Collins 3-1, G McGonigle 0-5, P McEldowney 1-0, R Stevenson 0-4, G Biggs 0-3, C Glasgow 0-1.		S Masterson 1-0, D McKenna 0-3, M Trainor 0-3, M Coulter 0-1.	Referee: D Gallagher (Antrim)

Final

7 July 1991 Final	Derry	3-10 - 2-11	Antrim	Casement Park, Belfast
				Referee: HP McCusker (Down)

=== All-Ireland Senior Hurling Championship ===
Semi-finals

4 August 1991 Semi-final	Galway	1-13 - 2-15	Tipperary	Croke Park, Dublin
	M Head 0-7, D O'Brien 1-0, F Forde 0-2, J McGrath 0-1, R Kilcommins 0-1, P Fahey 0-1, D Coleman 0-1.		T Dunne 0-8, G Maguire 1-1, T Fogarty 1-1, A Hogan 0-2, L Barrett 0-1.	Referee: P Horan (Offaly)

11 August 1991 Semi-final	Kilkenny	0-15 - 2-06	Derry	Croke Park, Dublin
	PJ Delaney 0-7, S Dollard 0-3, G Walsh 0-2, D Maher 0-1, R Shortall 0-1, D Byrne 0-1.		S Stevenson 0-4, M Collins 1-0, P McEldowney 1-0, G Biggs 0-1, G McGonigle 0-1.	Referee: JJ Corcoran (Galway)

Final

1 September 1991 Final	Kilkenny	0-15 - 1-10	Tipperary	Croke Park, Dublin
	PJ Delaney 0-6, D Maher 0-3, S Dollard 0-2, D Byrne 0-1, M Owens 0-1, R Shortall 0-1, J Hickey 0-1.		T Dunne 0-5, C Egan 1-0, A Hogan 0-2, M Leonard 0-1, T Fogarty 0-1, G Maguire 0-1.	Referee: P Horan (Offaly)

== Championship statistics ==
=== Top scorers ===
Top scorers overall

Rank	Player	Club	Tally	Total	Matches	Average
1	P. J. Delaney	Kilkenny	2-29	35	4	8.75
2	Tommy Dunne	Tipperary	0-24	24	4	6.00
3	Michael Collins	Derry	6-02	20	3	6.66
