= Ian Lynam =

Irish hurler, later team coach and manager

Personal information
- Native name: Eoin Ó Laigheanáin (Irish)
- Born: 1970 (age 55–56) Blackpool, Cork, Ireland

Sport
- Sport: Hurling
- Position: Goalkeeper
Club
- Years: Club
- Glen Rovers
Club titles
- Cork titles: 1
Inter-county*
Years	County	Apps (scores)
1994-1995	Cork	0 (0-00)
Inter-county titles
- Munster titles: 0
- All-Irelands: 0
- NHL: 0
- All Stars: 0
- *Inter County team apps and scores correct as of 17:50, 5 August 2014.

Ian Lynam (born 1970) is an Irish retired hurler who played as a goalkeeper for the Cork senior team.

Born in Blackpool, Cork, Lynam first arrived on the inter-county scene at the age of seventeen when he first linked up with the Cork minor team, before later joining the under-21 side. He made his senior debut during the 1994-95 National Hurling League. Lynam went on to play for Cork for just one championship season.

At club level Lynam is a one-time championship medallist with Glen Rovers.

In retirement from playing, Lynam became involved in team management and coaching. He has served as manager of the Glen Rovers senior team and is the current coach of the side.

== Honours ==
=== Team ===
Glen Rovers

- Cork Senior Hurling Championship (1): 1989

Cork

- Munster Under-21 Hurling Championship (1): 1991 (sub)
- Munster Minor Hurling Championship (1): 1988
