= 2020 Cork Premier Senior Hurling Championship =

Annual hurling competition season

- Dates: 31 July 2020 – 4 October 2020
- Teams: 15
- Sponsor: Co-Op Superstores
- Champions: Blackrock (33rd title); Michael O'Halloran (captain); Cathal Cormack (captain); Fergal Ryan (manager)
- Runners-up: Glen Rovers; Brian Moylan (captain); Richie Kelleher (manager)
- Relegated: Ballyhea

Tournament statistics
- Matches played: 26
- Goals scored: 75 (2.88 per match)
- Points scored: 914 (35.15 per match)
- Top scorer(s): Alan Connolly (5-52)

The 2020 Cork Premier Senior Hurling Championship was the inaugural staging of the Cork Premier Senior Hurling Championship and the 132nd staging overall of a championship for the top-ranking hurling teams in Cork. The draw for the group stage placings took place on 19 November 2019. The championship was scheduled to begin on 17 April 2020, however, it was postponed indefinitely due to the impact of the COVID-19 pandemic on Gaelic games. The championship began on 31 July 2020 and ended on 4 October 2020.

Imokilly were the defending champions, however, they failed to qualify for the knockout stage after being beaten by University College Cork in the divisional final. Ballyhea were relegated from the championship after being beaten in a playoff by Bishopstown.

The final was played on 4 October 2020 at Páirc Uí Chaoimh in Cork, between Blackrock and Glen Rovers, in what was their first meeting in a final in 42 years. Blackrock won the match by 4–26 to 4-18 - the first ever to be settled in extra time - to claim their 33rd championship title overall and a first title since 2002.

Blackrock's Alan Connolly was the championship's top scorer with 5-52.

== Format change ==
On 26 March 2019, three championship proposals were circulated to Cork club delegates. A core element running through all three proposals, put together by the Cork GAA games workgroup, was that there be a group stage of 12 teams followed by a knock-out stage, straight relegation and one team from the divisions/colleges section to enter at the preliminary quarter-final stage. On 2 April 2019, a majority of 136 club delegates voted for Option A which would limit the number of participating club teams to 12 and see one round of games played in April and two more in August – all with county players available.

The championship was scheduled to begin in April 2020, however, it was postponed indefinitely due to the coronavirus pandemic in Ireland. When the championship resumed, time constraints led to a revision of the format, with the play-offs for the second best and third best third placed teams being abolished. The knockout stage was further reduced, with the best-ranking team from the group stage receiving a bye to the semi-finals and the other five qualifying teams joining the divisional/colleges section winner in contesting three quarter-finals.

== Team changes ==
=== From Championship ===
Regraded to the Cork Senior A Hurling Championship

- Ballymartle
- Bandon
- Bride Rovers
- Charleville
- Kanturk
- Killeagh
- Newcestown

== Participating teams ==
=== Clubs ===
The club rankings were based on a championship performance 'points' system over the previous four seasons.

Team	Location	Colours	Seeding	Ranking
Glen Rovers	Blackpool	Green, black and yellow	A	1
Midleton	Midleton	Black and white	A	2
Blackrock	Blackrock	Green and yellow	A	3
Erin's Own	Glounthaune	Blue and red	B	4
Sarsfields	Glanmire	Blue, black and white	B	5
St. Finbarr's	Togher	Blue and yellow	B	6
Douglas	Douglas	Green, white and black	C	7
Na Piarsaigh	Farranree	Black and yellow	C	8
Bishopstown	Bishopstown	Maroon and white	C	9
Newtownshandrum	Newtownshandrum	Green and yellow	D	10
Carrigtwohill	Carrigtwohill	Blue and gold	D	11
Ballyhea	Ballyhea	Black and white	D	12

=== Divisions and colleges ===
Team	Location	Colours
Duhallow	Duhallow	Orange and black
Imokilly	East Cork	Red and white
University College Cork	College Road	Red and black

== Results ==
=== Group 1 ===
==== Table ====
Advance to knockout stage Advance to relegation play-off

Team	Matches				Score			Pts
Team	Pld	W	D	L	For	Against	Diff	Pts
Sarsfields	3	3	0	0	8-62	3-54	23	6
Douglas	3	2	0	1	1-61	6-44	2	4
Midleton	3	1	0	2	6-58	3-52	15	2
Ballyhea	3	0	0	3	3-39	6-70	-40	0

==== Results ====
31 July 2020 Round 1	Midleton	1-17 - 2-17	Sarsfields	Páirc Uí Rinn
	C Lehane 0-10 (0-6f), L O’Farrell 1-1, C Walsh, C Beausang 0-3 each.	Report	L Healy 1-7 (0-5f, 0-1 65), A Myers 1-2, J Sweeney 0-3, J O’Connor, C Darcy 0-2 each, D English 0-1.	Referee: M Maher (St. Finbarr's)

1 August 2020 Round 1	Douglas	0-17 - 1-11	Ballyhea	Mallow GAA Complex
	A Cadogan (0-6), S Kingston (0-4, 2 frees), M Harrington (0-2), B Turnbull, S Donegan, A Ward, C O’Donovan and A O’Connell (0-1 each).	Report	P O’Callaghan (0-9, 5 frees, 1 ’65), K Copps (1-0), J Morrissey and E O’Leary (0-1 each).

7 August 2020 Round 2	Ballyhea	1-13 - 4-23	Midleton	Páirc Mac Gearailt
	P O’Callaghan 0-8 (0-6f, 0-2 65), T Hanley 1-1, C Cox, E O’Leary, G Morrissey, S O’Kelly 0-1 each.	Report	C Lehane 3-11 (1-0 penalty, 0-6f, 0-2 65) P White 1-2, T O’Connell 0-4, L O’Farrell, C Beausang 0-2 each, S O’Meara, C Walsh 0-1 each.	Referee: C Lane (Banteer)

8 August 2020 Round 2	Sarsfields	4-15 - 1-22	Douglas	Páirc Uí Chaoimh
	L Healy (1-6, 0-4 frees); J O’Connor (2-1); J Sweeney (0-4); D Hogan (1-1); A Myers, D English, D Kearney (0-1 each).	Report	S Kingston (0-12, 6 frees); A Cadogan (1-4); C Baldwin (0-2); C Kingston, E Dolan, M O’Connor, A O’Connell (0-1 each).	Referee: S Stokes (Tullylease)

29 August 2020 Round 3	Midleton	1-18 - 0-22	Douglas	Páirc Uí Chaoimh
	C Lehane (0-9, 0-4 frees, 0-1 ‘65); L O’Farrell (1-2); P White, C Walsh (0-2 each); S O’Leary Hayes, J Nagle, T O’Connell (0-1 each).	Report	S Kingston (0-10, 0-6 frees, 0-1 ‘65); A Cadogan (0-5); B Turnbull (0-4); C O’Donovan (0-2); E Cadogan (0-1).	Referee: S Stokes (Tullylease)

29 August 2020 Round 3	Sarsfields	2-30 - 1-15	Ballyhea	Mourne Abbey
	L Healy 0-11 (0-6 f, 0-1 65); J O’Connor 1-4; J Sweeney 1-2; P Leopold 0-4; D Walsh 0-3; A Myres, C Darcy 0-2 each, D Kearney, D Hogan, 0-1 each.	Report	P O’Callaghan 1-10 (0-4 f, 0-1 65, 1-0 pen); M O’Sullivan 0-4; E O’Leary 0-1.

=== Group 2 ===
==== Table ====
Advance to knockout stage Advance to relegation play-off

Team	Matches				Score			Pts
Team	Pld	W	D	L	For	Against	Diff	Pts
Blackrock	3	3	0	0	8-57	4-44	25	6
Erin's Own	3	1	1	1	5-43	4-48	-2	3
Newtownshandrum	3	1	1	1	3-53	5-56	-9	3
Bishopstown	3	0	0	3	2-47	5-52	-14	0

==== Results ====
1 August 2020 Round 1	Blackrock	2-16 - 2-12	Erin's Own	Páirc Uí Rinn
	A Connolly (1-9, 0-6 frees, 0-1 ‘65); Ciaran Cormack (1-1); T Deasy (0-2); K O’Keeffe, S Murphy, D O’Farrell, R Cotter (0-1 each).	Report	E Murphy (0-5, 0-4 frees, 0-1 ‘65); R O’Flynn (0-4); M O’Carroll, A Bowen (1-0 each); J O’Carroll (0-2); R Twomey (0-1).	Referee: C O'Regan

2 August 2020 Round 1	Bishopstown	1-15 - 0-21	Newtownshandrum	O'Connell Park
	P Cronin (0-6, 0-4 frees, 0-1 ‘65); B Murray (0-4); T Murray (0-3); M Driscoll (1-0); D Lester, D Quaid (0-1 each).	Report	J Coughlan (0-6, 0-6 frees); D McCarthy (0-4); P O’Sullivan, T O’Mahony, C O’Brien, C Griffin (0-2 each); M Thompson, J Twomey, J O’Mahony (0-1 each).

8 August 2020 Round 2	Erin's Own	1-16 - 1-14	Bishopstown	Páirc Uí Rinn
	E Murphy (0-7, 0-5 fress, 0-2 ‘65s); R Twomey (1-2); A Bowen, C Lenihan (0-2 each); J O’Carroll, R O’Flynn, S Horgan (0-1 each).	Report	P Cronin (1-5, 0-4 frees, 0-1 ‘65); T Murray (0-4); C Hegarty (0-2); D Lester, J Scally, B Murray (0-1 each).	Referee: M Maher

9 August 2020 Round 2	Newtownshandrum	2-14 - 2-26	Blackrock	Mallow GAA Complex
	J Coughlan 2-6 (1-0 penalty, 0-4 f), D McCarthy, S Griffin, J Lane 0-2 each, T O’Mahony, D O’Connor 0-1 each.	Report	A Connolly 1-11 (0-9 f, 0-1 65), T Deasy 1-6 (0-1 sideline), R Cotter 0-4, S O’Keeffe 0-2, D Meaney, D O’Farrell, Ciarán Cormack 0-1 each.

29 August 2020 Round 3	Blackrock	4-15 - 0-18	Bishopstown	Ballyanley Sportsfield
	A Connolly (1-6, 5 frees), M O’Keeffe (2-2), M O’Halloran (1-0), R Cotter (0-2), G Connolly (free), Cathal Cormack, D Meaney, D O’Farrell and Ciarán Cormack (0-1 each).	Report	P Cronin (0-8, 5 frees), T Murray (0-5, 1 sideline, 1 free), B Murray (0-3), C Hegarty and A O’Sullivan (0-1 each).

29 August 2020 Round 3	Erin's Own	2-15 - 1-18	Newtownshandrum	O'Connell Park
	E Murphy (0-10, 0-8 frees, 0-1 65), C Coakley (1-1), R O’Flynn (1-0), A Bowen (0-2), M O’Carroll and C O’Callaghan (0-1 each).	Report	J Coughlan (1-8, 0-6 frees), T O’Mahony (0-3), C Twomey and D McCarthy (0-2 each), J Twomey, C O’Brien and J Lane (0-1 each).

=== Group 3 ===
==== Table ====
Advance to knockout stage

Team	Matches				Score			Pts
Team	Pld	W	D	L	For	Against	Diff	Pts
Glen Rovers	3	3	0	0	6-59	1-43	31	6
Na Piarsaigh	3	1	1	1	3-52	3-55	-3	3
St. Finbarr's	3	1	0	2	3-58	5-53	-1	2
Carrigtwohill	3	0	1	2	2-43	5-61	-27	1

==== Results ====
1 August 2020 Round 1	Glen Rovers	3-20 - 0-15	St. Finbarr's	Páirc Uí Chaoimh
	P Horgan (1-9, 0-5 frees); S Kennefick (2-1); L Coughlan (0-3); L Horgan, D Noonan (0-2 each); C Dorris, S Tynan (0-1 each).	Report	E Finn (0-5, 0-3 frees); D Cahalane (0-3, 0-1 free); E Keane, B Hennessy (0-2 each); B Hayes, B Beckett, C Keane (0-1 each).	Referee: C McAllister (Aghada)

2 August 2020 Round 1	Na Piarsaigh	1-17 - 1-17	Carrigtwohill	Caherlag Sportsfield
	E Sheehan (0-7, 4 frees): S Forde (1-2); D Connery (0-3, 1 free): K Moynihan (0-2): P Guest, K Forde, C Joyce (0-1 each).	Report	L Gosnell (0-8, 7 frees): J Mulcahy (0-3); L O’Sullivan (1-0); N McCarthy (0-2); T Hogan, D Rooney, S Walsh, P Hogan (0-1 each).	Referee: S Stokes (Tullylease)

8 August 2020 Round 2	Carrigtwohill	1-16 - 1-18	Glen Rovers	Páirc Uí Chonaill
	L Gosnell (1-6, 2 frees), S Walsh (0-6 frees), T Hogan, A Walsh Barry, J McCarthy, and J Mulcahy (0-1 each).	Report	C Dorris (1-5), P Horgan (0-8, 6 frees, 1 ‘65’), D Brosnan (0-2), D Cronin, R Downey and S Kennefick (0-1 each).	Referee: C O'Regan (Ballyhea)

9 August 2020 Round 2	Na Piarsaigh	2-23 - 0-17	St. Finbarr's	Páirc Uí Rinn
	E Sheehan (0-9, 7 frees); S Forde (2-2); D Connery (1 ‘65, 1 free), C Hanifin (0-3 each); P Guest (0-2); K Moynihan, C Joyce, C Hanifin, D Gunning (0-1 each).	Report	B Hayes (0-6); C Cahalane (0-5 frees); C Barrett, J Cahalane (0-2 each); D Cahlane (free), E Twomey (0-1 each).	Referee: D Copps (Ballyhea)

29 August 2020 Round 3	Na Piarsaigh	0-12 - 2-21	Glen Rovers	Páirc Uí Rinn
	E Sheehan 0-9 (0-4 f), S Forde, C Hanifin, G Joyce 0-1 each.	Report	P Horgan 0-13 (0-10 f), S Kennefick 1-4, R Downey 1-1, D Brosnan, L Coughlan, M Dooley 0-1 each.	Referee: C Lane (Banteer)

29 August 2020 Round 3	St. Finbarr's	3-26 - 0-10	Carrigtwohill	Carrigaline Sportsfield
	E Finn 0-10 (0-7 f, 0-1 65), E Twomey 2-4, J Cahalane 0-5, B Hennessy 1-2, B Hayes 0-2, J Neville, S Sherlock, C Cahalane 0-1.	Report	S Walsh 0-5 (0-4 f), L Gosnell 0-3 (0-2 f), L O’Kelly, J McCarthy 0-1 each.

=== Divisional/colleges sections ===
==== Semi-final ====
18 August 2020 Semi-final	Duhallow	2-13 - 3-22	University College Cork	Mourne Abbey
	T Howard (1-3, 0-2 frees), K Tarrant (1-0), S O’Reilly (0-3 frees), M Ellis (0-2, 0-1 free), W Murphy, E Sheahan, J Murphy, G Linehan and B Murphy (0-1 each).	Report	O McCarthy (1-2), S Conway (0-5, 0-2 frees, 0-1 65), D Griffin (1-1), J Keating (0-4), P O’Leary (1-0), K O’Leary (0-3), M Coleman and B Verling (0-2 each), P O’Loughlin, E Desmond and B Kelleher (0-1 each).	Referee: C O'Regan (Ballyhea)

==== Final ====
23 August 2020 Final	Imokilly	1-20 - 1-23	University College Cork	Páirc Uí Rinn
	W Leahy (1-8, 7 frees); B Lawton (0-3), B Cooper L O’Shea, J Looney, (0-2 each); D O’Leary, N O’Leary, J Beausang (0-1 each).	Report	S Conway (0-6, 4 frees), O McCarthy (1-1), N Montgomery (0-5); S Barrett (0-3) B Verling, B Kelleher (0-2 each), K Walsh, M Coleman (sl), D Heffernan, P Power (0-1 each).

=== Relegation playoff ===
13 September 2020 Playoff	Ballyhea	0-10 - 0-18	Bishopstown	Mallow GAA Complex
	M O’Sullivan 0-4; P O’Callaghan 0-4 (all frees); C Cox, M Browne (f) 0-1 each.	Report	T Murray 0-7 (3fs, 1 '65); J Scally 0-3; P Cronin, M Power, B Murray, C Hegarty 0-2 each.

=== Knock-out stage ===
==== Bracket ====
Quarter-Finals
1A	Sarsfields	1-12
2B	Erin's Own	0-16
1B	Blackrock	1-22
2A	Douglas	0-20
D/C	UCC	2-20
2C	Na Piarsaigh	3-11

Semi-Finals
2B	Erin's Own	3-10
1C	Glen Rovers	0-22
1B	Blackrock	3-26
D/C	UCC	0-34

Final
1C	Glen Rovers	4-18
1B	Blackrock	4-26

==== Quarter-finals ====
12 September 2020 Quarter-final	Sarsfields	1-12 - 0-16	Erin's Own	Páirc Uí Chaoimh
	L Healy (0-6, 0-4 frees), D Hogan (1-0), A Myers and P Leopold (0-2 each), J O’Connor and C Darcy (0-1 each).	Report	E Murphy (0-10, 0-6 frees, 0-2 65s), R O’Flynn (0-3), C Lenihan, M O’Carroll, and R Twomey (0-1 each).

13 September 2020 Quarter-final	Douglas	0-20 - 1-22	Blackrock	Páirc Uí Chaoimh
	S Kingston 0-10 (0-4f, 0-2 ’65), B Turnbull 0-5, A Cadogan 0-3, M O’Connor, C Baldwin 0-1 each.	Report	A Connolly 1-6 (0-5f, 0-1 ’65), M O’Halloran 0-7, S O’Keeffe, C Cormack 0-2 each, N Cashman, D Meaney, D O’Farrell, J O’Sullivan, T Deasy 0-1 each.

13 September 2020 Quarter-final	Na Piarsaigh	3-11 - 2-20	University College Cork	Páirc Uí Rinn
	Evan Sheehan 0-6 (0-4 f), P Guest 2-0, D Connery 0-4 (0-2 65, 0-1 f), S Forde 1-1.	Report	S Conway 0-9 (0-7 f), P Power 1-4, B Kelleher 1-0, M Kehoe 0-2, M Coleman (f), J Keating, S Barrett, É Desmond, B Verling 0-1 each.

==== Semi-finals ====
26 September 2020 Semi-final	Blackrock	3-26 - 0-34 (aet)	University College Cork	Páirc Uí Chaoimh
	S O’Keeffe (2-1); A Connolly (1-7, 5 frees 1 65); T Deasy (0-5, 1 sideline); J O’Sullivan (0-4); N Cashman (0-2 1 free 1 65); D Meaney, M O’Keeffe (0-2 each); Cathal Cormack, D O’Farrell, R Cotter (0-1 each).	Report	S Conway (0-14, 9 frees, 1 sideline); P Power (0-6); C Boylan, S Barrett (0-3 each); D Griffin, M Kehoe (0-2 each); M Coleman, A Casey, E.Desmond, B Verling (0-1 each).	Referee: J Larkin (Ballinora)

26 September 2020 Semi-final	Glen Rovers	0-22 - 3-10	Erin's Own	Páirc Uí Chaoimh
	P Horgan 0-14 (0-9 f, 0-1 65), S Kennefick, D Noonan, D Cronin 0-2 each, D Tynan, D Brosnan 0-1 each.	Report	R O'Flynn 1-5 (0-2 f), M O'Carroll 1-1, A Bowen 0-3 (0-2 f), C O'Callaghan 1-0, E Murphy 0-1 f.	Referee: S Stokes (Tullylease)

==== Final ====
4 October 2020 Final	Blackrock	4-26 - 4-18 (aet)	Glen Rovers	Páirc Uí Chaoimh
	A Connolly (0-13, 10 frees); R Cotter (2-2); T Deasy (0-1 sideline), S O’Keeffe (1-1 each); N Cashman, D Meaney, M O’Halloran, A O’Callaghan (0-2 each); J O’Sullivan (0-1).	Report	P Horgan (1-11, 1-0 pen, 5 frees, 2 65s); S Kennefick (2-0); M Dooley (1-2); A O’Donovan (0-2); L Coughlan, D Brosnan (0-1 each).	Referee: C McAllister (Aghada)

== Championship statistics ==
=== Top scorers ===
Overall

Rank	Player	Club	Tally	Total	Matches	Average
1	Alan Connolly	Blackrock	5-52	67	6	11.16
2	Patrick Horgan	Glen Rovers	2-55	61	5	12.20
3	Conor Lehane	Midleton	3-30	39	3	13.00
4	Liam Healy	Sarsfields	2-30	36	4	9.00
4	Shane Kingston	Douglas	0-36	36	4	9.00
5	Pa O'Callaghan	Ballyhea	1-31	34	4	8.50
5	Shane Conway	UCC	0-34	34	4	8.50
6	Evan Sheehan	Na Piarsaigh	0-33	33	4	8.25
6	Eoghan Murphy	Erin's Own	0-33	33	5	6.60
7	Jamie Coughlan	Newtownshandrum	3-20	29	3	9.66

In a single game

Rank	Player	Club	Tally	Total	Opposition
1	Conor Lehane	Midleton	3-11	20	Ballyhea
2	Alan Connolly	Blackrock	1-11	14	Newtownshandrum
2	Patrick Horgan	Glen Rovers	1-11	14	Blackrock
2	Shane Conway	UCC	0-14	14	Blackrock
2	Patrick Horgan	Glen Rovers	0-14	14	Erin's Own
3	Pa O'Callaghan	Ballyhea	1-10	13	Sarsfields
3	Alan Connolly	Blackrock	0-13	13	Blackrock
3	Patrick Horgan	Glen Rovers	0-13	13	Na Piarsaigh
4	Jamie Coughlan	Newtownshandrum	2-06	12	Blackrock
4	Patrick Horgan	Glen Rovers	1-09	12	St. Finbarr's
4	Alan Connolly	Blackrock	1-09	12	Erin's Own
4	Shane Kingston	Douglas	0-12	12	Sarsfields

=== Match records ===
- Widest winning margin: 25 points
  - St. Finbarr's 3-26 - 0-10 Carrigtwohill (Group Stage Round 3)
- Most goals in a match: 8
  - Blackrock 4-26 - 4-18 Glen Rovers (Final)
- Most points in a match: 60
  - Blackrock 3-26 - 0-34 University College Cork (Semi-final)
- Most goals by one team in a match: 4
  - Midleton 4-23 - 1-13 Ballyhea (Group Stage Round 2)
  - Sarsfields 4-15 - 1-22 Douglas (Group Stage Round 2)
  - Blackrock 4-15 - 0-18 Bishopstown (Group Stage Round 3)
  - Blackrock 4-26 - 4-18 Glen Rovers (Final)
- Most goals scored by a losing team: 4
  - Glen Rovers 4-18 - 4-26 Blackrock (Final)
- Most points scored by a losing team: 34
  - University College Cork 0-34 - 3-26 Blackrock (Semi-final)

=== Miscellaneous ===
- On 8 August 2020, Patrick Horgan from the Glen Rovers club became the first player to surpass the cumulative total of 600 points.
- On 12 September 2020, Eoghan Murphy from the Erin's Own club became only the second player ever to surpass the cumulative total of 500 points.
- Blackrock and Glen Rovers met each other in the final for the first time since 1978.
- It was the first all city final since 1982.
- It was the first final not to feature an East Cork team since 2003
- Blackrock win the title for the first time since 2002.
