= 1990 All-Ireland Minor Hurling Championship =

Kilkenny wins All-Ireland Minor Hurling Championship in 1990

All-Ireland Minor Hurling Championship 1990
Championship Details
- Dates: 12 May 1990 – 3 September 1990
- Teams: 15

All Ireland Champions
- Winners: Kilkenny (14th win)
- Captain: James McDermott

All Ireland Runners-up
- Runners-up: Cork
- Captain: Peter Smith

Provincial Champions
- Munster: Cork
- Leinster: Kilkenny
- Ulster: Derry
- Connacht: Not Played

Championship Statistics
- Top Scorer: Damien Fleming (7-27)

The 1990 All-Ireland Minor Hurling Championship was the 60th staging of the All-Ireland Minor Hurling Championship since its establishment by the Gaelic Athletic Association in 1928. The championship began on 12 May 1990 and ended on 3 September 1990.

Offaly entered the championship as the defending champions, however, they were beaten by Wexford in the Leinster quarter-final.

On 3 September 1990, Kilkenny won the championship following a 1–09 to 0–09 defeat of Cork in the All-Ireland final. This was their 14th All-Ireland title overall and their first title since 1988.

Cork's Damian Fleming was the championship's top scorer with 7-27.

== Results ==
=== Leinster Minor Hurling Championship ===
Semi-finals

27 June 1990 Semi-final	Laois	2-10 - 1-12	Dublin	Geraldine Park, Athy
	B Bohane 0-6, E Cashin 1-0, R McEvoy 1-0, PJ Peacock 0-3, E Fitzpatrick 0-1.		D Wise 0-5, G Cullen 1-1, M Gelston 0-2, P Tierney 0-1, G Hogan 0-1, E Patterson 0-1, D McCormack 0-1.

29 June 1990 Semi-final	Kilkenny	3-05 - 3-05	Wexford	Dr. Cullen Park, Carlow
	D Lawlor 2-3, J Shefflin 1-2.		E Scallan 1-2, E Cullen 1-1, S Hughes 1-0, A Fenlon 0-2.

4 July 1990 Semi-final replay	Kilkenny	3-14 - 0-10	Wexford	Dr. Cullen Park, Carlow
	P Farrell 1-4, D Lawlor 1-2, C Brennan 1-0, PJ Delaney 0-2, J Shefflin 0-2, A Comerford 0-2, J McDermott 0-1, S Ryan 0-1.		D Mahony 0-2, P Finn 0-2, A Fenlon 0-2, F Cullen 0-2, J Mackey 0-1, E Scallan 0-1.	Referee: T Maher (Laois)

Final

8 July 1990 Final	Kilkenny	3-15 - 0-15	Laois	Croke Park, Dublin
	D Lawlor 1-7, S Ryan 1-1, A Cleere 1-0, A Comerford 0-3, PJ Delaney 0-2, P Farrell 0-1, J Shefflin 0-1.		B Bohane 0-6, D Delaney 0-2, T Kenna 0-2, PJ Peacock 0-2, E Murphy 0-1, D Conroy 0-1, S Kennedy 0-1.	Referee: P Horan (Laois)

=== Munster Minor Hurling Championship ===
First round

16 May 1990 First round	Cork	8-22 - 1-02	Kerry	Kanturk Sportsfield, Kanturk
	K Murray 5-2, D Fleming 2-5, M Landers 1-2, B Egan 0-5, R Lewis 0-5, R O'Connell 0-1, D Long 0-1, A White 0-1.		TJ Curran 1-0, B O'Sullivan 0-1, E O'Sullivan 0-1.	Referee: J Moore (Waterford)

16 May 1990 First round	Clare	1-10 - 1-10	Tipperary	Gaelic Grounds, Limerick
	K McNamara 1-1, J O'Connor 0-4, P Minogue 0-2, S Sheedy 0-1, P O'Rourke 0-1, A Whelan 0-1.		J Kennedy 1-7, V Kelly 0-2, T Dunne 0-1.	Referee: T Lyons (Limerick)

23 May 1990 First round replay	Clare	2-12 - 0-10 (aet)	Tipperary	Gaelic Grounds, Limerick
	D O'Riordan 1-2, P O'Rourke 1-2, K McNamara 0-4, A Whelan 0-1, J O'Connor 0-1, S Sheehy 0-1, P Minogue 0-1.		J Kennedy 0-6, P Maguire 0-1, V Kelly 0-1, P Sheehan 0-1, G Collins 0-1.	Referee: T Lyons (Limerick)

Semi-finals

4 July 1990 Semi-final	Limerick	1-05 - 1-11	Clare	Gaelic Grounds, Limerick
	M Murnane 1-0, P Moloney 0-2, D Stanners 0-2, C Murphy 0-1.		K McNamara 0-4, P Minogue 1-0, P O'Rourke 0-2, J O'Connor 0-2, D O'Riordan 0-2, E Wall 0-1.	Referee: J McDonnell (Tipperary)

4 July 1990 Semi-final	Waterford	4-11 - 6-14	Cork	Walsh Park, Waterford
	T Browne 1-5, K McGrath 1-1, B Coughlan 1-1, J Kennedy 1-0, A Fitzgerald 0-2, C Sweeney 0-1, E Dunphy 0-1.		D Fleming 2-5, K Murray 3-1, M Landers 1-1, B Sheehan 0-3, A White 0-1, C Buckley 0-1, R Lewis 0-1, B Egan 0-1.	Referee: M Doyle (Tipperary)

Final

15 July 1990 Final	Cork	1-09 - 0-09	Clare	Semple Stadium, Thurles
	D Fleming 1-6, R Lewis 0-1, K Murray 0-1, B Egan 0-1.		E Wall 0-4, P Minogue 0-3, A Whelan 0-1, C Lynch 0-1.

=== Ulster Minor Hurling Championship ===
Semi-final

24 June 1990 Semi-final	Derry	1-10 - 0-10	Down	Athletic Grounds, Armagh
	S Downey 1-0, O Collins 0-3, R Stephenson 0-3, M Collins 0-2, G McGonagle 0-2.		K Balyney 0-2, C Murphy 0-2, D Flynn 0-2, M Traynor 0-1, G McGrattan 0-1.	Referee: T Donnelly (Antrim)

Final

8 July 1990 Final	Antrim	1-08 - 4-11	Derry	Casement Park, Belfast
	E Graham 0-5, S McDonald 1-0, E O'Hara 0-2, P Nolan 0-1.		M Collins 2-6, P McEldowney 2-0, M McKenna 0-2, P McLoy 0-1, G McGonagle 0-1, R Stephenson 0-1.

=== All-Ireland Minor Hurling Championship ===
Semi-finals

5 August 1990 Semi-final	Cork	1-14 - 1-09	Derry	Croke Park, Dublin
	D Fleming 0-6, M Landers 1-2, A White 0-2, B Egan 0-2, R O'Connell 0-2.		M Collins 1-4, B McCormick 0-2, H Mullan 0-1, O Collins 0-1, M McKenna 0-1.	Referee: P Horan (Offaly)

8 August 1990 Semi-final	Kilkenny	2-10 - 1-12	Galway	O'Connor Park, Tullamore
	D Lawlor 1-6, J Shefflin 1-0, A Comerford 0-2, S Ryan 0-1, R Shortall 0-1.		M Head 0-4, J McGrath 0-4, P Coyne 1-0, T Kirwan 0-2, L Burke 0-1, J Keane 0-1.

Final

2 September 1990 Final	Kilkenny	3-14 - 3-14	Cork	Croke Park, Dublin
	PJ Delaney 2-1, P Farrell 0-6, S Ryan 1-2, D Lawlor 0-4, J Shefflin 0-1.		D Fleming 2-1, B Egan 0-7, K Murray 1-3, L Meaney 0-1, R O'Connell 0-1, B Corcoran 0-1.	Referee: W Barrett (Tipperary)

30 September 1990 Final replay	Kilkenny	3-16 - 0-11	Cork	Semple Stadium, Thurles
	D Lawlor 1-6, PJ Delaney 2-0, P Farrell 0-4, J Shefflin 0-3, A Comerford 0-2, J McDermott 0-1.		D Fleming 0-4, K Murray 0-2, R O'Connell 0-2, B Egan 0-1, B Walsh 0-1, P Smith 0-1.	Referee: W Barrett (Tipperary)

== Championship statistics ==
=== Top scorers ===
Top scorers overall

Rank	Player	Club	Tally	Total	Matches	Average
1	Damian Fleming	Cork	7-27	48	6	8.00
2	Dermot Lawler	Kilkenny	6-28	46	6	7.66
3	Kevin Murray	Cork	9-09	36	6	6.00
4	Michael Collins	Derry	3-12	21	3	7.00
5	John Kennedy	Tipperary	2-13	19	3	6.33
