= 1979 All-Ireland Minor Hurling Championship =

All-Ireland Minor Hurling Championship 1979
All Ireland Champions
- Winners: Cork (14th win)
- Captain: Christy Coughlan

All Ireland Runners-up
- Runners-up: Kilkenny
- Captain: Seánie Tyrrell

Provincial Champions
- Munster: Cork
- Leinster: Kilkenny
- Ulster: Not Played
- Connacht: Not Played

The 1979 All-Ireland Minor Hurling Championship was the 49th staging of the All-Ireland Minor Hurling Championship since its establishment by the Gaelic Athletic Association in 1928.

Cork entered the championship as the defending champions.

On 2 September 1979 Cork won the championship following a 2-11 to 1-9 defeat of Kilkenny in the All-Ireland final. This was their second All-Ireland title in-a-row and their 14th overall.

== Results ==
=== Leinster Minor Hurling Championship ===
==== Leinster first round ====
12 May 1979 First round	Meath	2-04 - 4-07	Down	Cusack Park

==== Leinster quarter-finals ====
26 May 1979 Quarter-final	Westmeath	2-08 - 5-14	Down	Cusack Park

26 May 1979 Quarter-final	Kilkenny	2-16 - 2-07	Offaly	O'Moore Park

27 May 1979 Quarter-final	Antrim	2-08 - 1-02	Dublin	Croke Park

==== Leinster semi-finals ====
27 June 1979 Semi-final	Kilkenny	1-14 - 1-07	Wexford	Dr. Cullen Park

30 June 1979 Semi-final	Antrim	3-11 - 1-01	Down	Croke Park

==== Leinster final ====
15 July 1979 Final	Kilkenny	5-13 - 1-09	Antrim	Semple Stadium

=== Munster Minor Hurling Championship ===
==== Munster first round ====
4 May 1979 First round	Tipperary	7-11 - 0-05	Kerry	MacDonagh Park

8 May 1979 First round	Limerick	6-12 - 1-05	Waterford	Semple Stadium

==== Munster semi-finals ====
18 May 1979 Semi-final	Limerick	2-07 - 1-10	Clare	MacDonagh Park

25 May 1979 Semi-final	Cork	1-08- 2-04	Tipperary	Gaelic Grounds

29 June 1979 Semi-final replay	Limerick	6-04 - 2-03	Clare	MacDonagh Park

==== Munster final ====
8 July 1979 Final	Cork	3-17 - 4-04	Limerick	Semple Stadium

=== All-Ireland Minor Hurling Championship ===
==== All-Ireland semi-final ====
5 August 1979 Semi-final	Cork	6-15 - 0-06	Galway	Croke Park
	T Coakley 3-1, T Coyne 1-6, K Hennessy 1-3, R Hegarty 1-1, M O'Sullivan 0-2, D Walsh 0-1, J Greally 0-1.		D Fahy 0-2, J Murphy 0-2, P Blaney 0-1, A Staunton 0-1.

==== All-Ireland final ====
2 September 1979 Final	Cork	2-11 - 1-09	Kilkenny	Croke Park
	T Coyne 1-4, T Coakley 1-0, M O'Sullivan 0-3, T O'Sullivan 0-2, D Scanlon 0-2.		J Mahon 0-5, S Tyrrell 1-0, B Purcell 0-1, J O'Dwyer 0-1, P Phelan 0-1, M Walsh 0-1.	Referee: N O'Donoghue (Dublin)
