= Alan Walsh (hurler) =

Irish hurler

Personal information
- Native name: Ailéin Breathnach (Irish)
- Born: 2002 (age 23–24) Kanturk, County Cork, Ireland
- Occupation: Student

Sport
- Sport: Hurling
- Position: Right wing-forward
Club
- Years: Club
- 2020-present: Kanturk
Club titles
- Cork titles: 0
College
- Years: College
- MTU Cork
College titles
- Fitzgibbon titles: 0
Inter-county*
| Years | County | Apps (scores) |
| 2025-present | Cork | 4 (3-02) |
Inter-county titles
- Munster titles: 0
- All-Irelands: 0
- NHL: 0
- All Stars: 0
- *Inter County team apps and scores correct as of 22:08, 5 July 2026.

Alan Walsh (born 2002) is an Irish hurler and Gaelic footballer. At club level, he plays with Kanturk and at inter-county level with the Cork senior hurling team.

== Career ==
Walsh played Gaelic football and hurling at all grades as a student at Coláiste Treasa in Kanturk. He was part of the school's senior hurling team that won the Munster PPS SCHC title in 2020. He later lined out with MTU Cork in the Fitzgibbon Cup.

At club level with Kanturk, Walsh plays as a dual player with the club's top adult teams. He won a Cork SAHC medal following Kanturk's win over Fr O'Neill's in 2021. This was followed by a Cork PIFC title in 2022, after a 3–11 to 1–10 win over Bantry Blues.

Walsh first appeared on the inter-county scene for Cork as a member of the under-20 football team in 2022. He linked up with the Cork senior hurling team for the first time in a challenge match in January 2025 but played no further part in Cork's season. Walsh was recalled to the senior team in 2026 and was included on the matchday panel for Cork's opening National Hurling League game against Waterford.

== Family ==
Walsh and his brothers, Colin and Paul, as well as his cousins, Aidan and Tommy, have all lined out for Cork in various grades.

== Career statistics ==
=== Club ===
As of 7 September 2025

| Team | Year | Cork SAHC | |
| Team | Year | Apps | Score |
|---|---|---|---|
| Kanturk | 2020 | 5 | 1-05 |
| Kanturk | 2021 | 5 | 3-01 |
| Kanturk | Total | 10 | 4-06 |
| Kanturk | Year | Cork PSHC | |
| Kanturk | Year | Apps | Score |
| Kanturk | 2022 | 3 | 2-04 |
| Kanturk | 2023 | 4 | 1-06 |
| Kanturk | 2024 | 4 | 5-10 |
| Kanturk | 2025 | 3 | 1-03 |
| Kanturk | Total | 14 | 9-23 |
| Career total | | 24 | 13-29 |

=== Inter-county ===
As of 4 July 2026

| Team | Year | National League | | | Munster | | All-Ireland | | Total | |
| Team | Year | Division | Apps | Score | Apps | Score | Apps | Score | Apps | Score |
|---|---|---|---|---|---|---|---|---|---|---|
| Cork | 2026 | Division 1A | 3 | 1-01 | 2 | 0-01 | 2 | 3-01 | 7 | 4-03 |
| Career total | | | 3 | 1-01 | 2 | 0-01 | 2 | 3-01 | 7 | 4-03 |

== Honours ==
Coláiste Treasa, Kanturk

- Munster PPS Senior C Hurling Championship: 2020

Kanturk

- Cork Senior A Hurling Championship: 2021
- Cork Premier Intermediate Football Championship: 2022
