= Ryan Walsh (hurler) =

Irish hurler (born 1999)

Personal information
- Native name: Riain Breathnach (Irish)
- Born: 1999 (age 26–27) Kanturk, County Cork, Ireland
- Occupation: Student

Sport
- Sport: Hurling
- Position: Midfield
Club
- Years: Club
- Kanturk
Club titles
- Cork titles: 0
College
- Years: College
- 2017-present: Cork Institute of Technology
College titles
- Fitzgibbon titles: 0
Inter-county*
Years	County	Apps (scores)
2019-present	Cork	0 (0-00)
Inter-county titles
- Munster titles: 0
- All-Irelands: 0
- NHL: 0
- All Stars: 0
- *Inter County team apps and scores correct as of 18:46, 20 December 2019.

Ryan Walsh (born 1999) is an Irish hurler who plays for Cork Championship club Kanturk and at inter-county level with the Cork senior hurling team. He usually lines out as a midfielder.

== Playing career ==
=== Cork Institute of Technology ===
As a student at the Cork Institute of Technology, Walsh immediately became involved in hurling by becoming a member of the institute's freshers' team before later joining the senior team. He has since lined out in several Fitzgibbon Cup campaigns.

=== Kanturk ===
Walsh joined the Kanturk club at a young age and played in all grades at juvenile and underage levels as a dual player, before eventually joining the club's top adult teams in both codes.

On 7 October 2017, Ryan lined out at midfield when Kanturk qualified to play Mallow in the Premier Intermediate Championship final. He scored a point from play and ended the game with a winners' medal after the 0–17 to 1–12 victory. Three weeks later on 29 October 2017, Ryan was also at midfield when the Kanturk intermediate football team faced Mitchelstown in the Intermediate A Championship final. He scored three points from play and claimed a winners' medal after the 0–14 to 0–13 victory. On 19 November 2017, Walsh won a Munster Club Championship medal with the hurlers after lining out at midfield in the 1–23 to 0-25 extra-time defeat of Kilmaley in the final. On 4 February 2018, he won an All-Ireland medal after scoring 1-02 from play in a 1–18 to 1–17 defeat of St Patrick's Ballyragget in the final.

=== Cork ===
==== Minor and under-21 ====
Walsh first lined out for Cork as a member of the minor team during the 2016 Munster Championship. He made his first appearance for the team on 6 April 2016 when he lined out at centre-back in Cork's 0–17 to 1–10 defeat of Waterford. Walsh was dropped from the minor team at the end of the season.

On 3 July 2019, Walsh made his first appearance for Cork's inaugural under-20 team in a 1–20 to 0–16 defeat of Limerick in the Munster Championship. On 23 July 2019, he scored a point from midfield when Cork suffered a 3–15 to 2–17 defeat by Tipperary in the Munster final. Walsh was again selected at midfield when Cork faced Tipperary for a second time in the All-Ireland final on 24 August 2019. He ended the game on the losing side after a 5–17 to 1–18 defeat.

==== Senior ====
Walsh first played for the Cork senior team when he was added to the panel during the 2020 Munster League. He made his first appearance for the team on 20 December 2019 when he scored 1-02 from midfield in Cork's 1–27 to 0–11 defeat of Kerry.

== Honours ==
Kanturk

- Cork Senior A Hurling Championship (1): 2021
- All-Ireland Intermediate Club Hurling Championship (1): 2018
- Munster Intermediate Club Hurling Championship (1): 2017
- Cork Premier Intermediate Hurling Championship (1): 2017

Cork

- Munster Under-20 Hurling Championship (1): 2019
