= Tommy Walsh (Cork Gaelic footballer) =

Irish Gaelic footballer

Personal information
- Native name: Tomás Breathnach (Irish)
- Born: 2003 (age 22–23) Kanturk, County Cork, Ireland
- Occupation: Student

Sport
- Sport: Gaelic football
- Position: Centre-back
Club
- Years: Club
- 2021-present: Kanturk
Club titles
- Cork titles: 0
College
- Years: College
- MTU Cork
College titles
- Sigerson titles: 0
Inter-county
- Years: County
- 2022-present: Cork
Inter-county titles
- Munster titles: 0
- All-Irelands: 0
- NFL: 0
- All Stars: 0

Tommy Walsh (born 2003) is an Irish Gaelic footballer. At club level he plays with Kanturk and at inter-county level with the Cork senior football team. He is a brother of Aidan Walsh.

== Career ==
Walsh first played Gaelic football and hurling to a high standard as a student at Coláiste Treasa in Kanturk. He was part of the school team that won the Munster Colleges SBHC title after beating Scoil Pól in the 2020 final. Walsh has also lined out with MTU Cork in the Sigerson Cup.

After progressing through the juvenile and underage ranks with the Kanturk club, Walsh made his adult team debut as a dual player in 2021. That year he was a member of the extended panel when Kanturk beat Fr O'Neill's to win the Cork SAHC title. A year later, Walsh was a full member of the team when Kanturk beat Bantry Blues to win the Cork PIFC title. The success continued in 2023 when he claimed a Duhallow U21AFC title.

Walsh first appeared on the inter-county scene for Cork as a dual player at minor level in 2020. He later progressed to the under-20 team as a Gaelic footballer and won a Munster U20FC medal in 2021. Walsh earned a call-up to the senior team in 2022.

== Honours ==
Coláiste Treasa

- Munster Colleges Senior C Hurling Championship: 2020

Kanturk

- Cork Senior A Hurling Championship: 2021
- Cork Premier Intermediate Football Championship: 2022
- Duhallow Under-21 A Football Championship: 2023

Cork

- McGrath Cup: 2023, 2024
- Munster Under-20 Football Championship: 2021
