= Darren Browne =

Irish hurler (born 1996)

Personal information
- Native name: Darrin de Brún (Irish)
- Born: 24 October 1996 (age 30) Kanturk, County Cork, Ireland
- Height: 6 ft 0 in (183 cm)

Sport
- Sport: Hurling
- Position: Left wing-back
Clubs*
Years	Club	Apps (scores)
2014-present 2015-2017	Kanturk; Duhallow	4 (0-00); 10 (0-00)
Club titles
- Cork titles: 0
College
- Years: College
- Mary Immaculate College
College titles
- Fitzgibbon titles: 0
Inter-county**
Years	County	Apps (scores)
2018-present	Cork	1 (0-00)
Inter-county titles
- Munster titles: 2
- All-Irelands: 0
- NHL: 0
- All Stars: 0 Dangleberries 4
- * club appearances and scores correct as of 15:44, 6 July 2019. **Inter County team apps and scores correct as of 11:19, 15 July 2019.

Darren Browne (born 10 October 1996) is an Irish hurler who plays for Cork Senior Championship club Kanturk and at inter-county level with the Cork senior hurling team. He usually lines out as a left wing-back.

== Playing career ==
=== Kanturk ===
Browne joined the Kanturk club at a young age and played in all grades of hurling and Gaelic football at juvenile and underage levels before joining the club's top adult teams as a dual player.

On 7 October 2017, Browne was at centre-back when Kanturk defeated Mallow by 0–17 to 1–12 to win the Premier Intermediate Championship title. Kanturk completed the double on 29 October, with Browne lining out at full-back in the 0–14 to 0–13 defeat of Mitchelstown to win the Intermediate Football Championship. He scored a point from left corner-back when Kanturk defeated Kilmaley by 1–23 to 0–25 to win the Munster Championship. Browne won an All-Ireland Championship medal from centre-back on 4 February 2018, after Kanturk's 1–18 to 1–17 defeat of St Patrick's Ballyragget in the final at Croke Park.

=== Cork ===
==== Minor and under-21 ====
Browne first played for Cork as a member of the minor team on 9 April 2014. He was at left wing-back for Cork's 5–26 to 0–09 defeat of Kerry in the Munster Championship.

On 17 June 2015, Browne made his first appearance for the Cork under-21 team in a 1–21 to 1–11 defeat by Waterford in the Munster Championship.

Browne was appointed captain of the Cork under-21 hurling team for the 2017 Munster Championship. On 26 July, he captained the team to a 0–16 to 0-11 Munster Championship final defeat by Clare. Browne was later nominated for a position on the Team of the Year.

==== Senior ====
Browne made his first appearance for the Cork senior hurling team on 10 January 2016 when he came on as a substitute in Cork's 1–20 to 0–18 defeat of Kerry in the Munster League. He was later cut from the panel before the National Hurling League.

== Career statistics ==
=== Club ===
As of match played 19 April 2019.

Team	Year	Cork PIHC		Munster		All-Ireland		Total	
Team	Year	Apps	Score	Apps	Score	Apps	Score	Apps	Score
Kanturk	2014	4	0-00	—		—		4	0-00
Kanturk	2015	5	0-00	—		—		5	0-00
Kanturk	2016	3	0-00	—		—		3	0-00
Kanturk	2017	5	0-02	3	0-01	3	0-00	11	0-02
Kanturk	Total	17	0-02	3	0-01	3	0-00	23	0-02
Kanturk	Year	Cork SHC		Munster		All-Ireland		Total	
Kanturk	Year	Apps	Score	Apps	Score	Apps	Score	Apps	Score
Kanturk	2018	3	0-00	—		—		3	0-00
Kanturk	2019	1	0-00	—		—		1	0-00
Kanturk	Total	4	0-00	—		—		4	0-00
Career total		21	0-02	3	0-01	3	0-00	27	0-02

=== Division ===
Team	Year	Cork SHC	
Team	Year	Apps	Score
Duhallow	2015	3	0-00
Duhallow	2016	3	0-00
Duhallow	2017	4	0-00
Career total		10	0-00

=== Inter-county ===
As of match played 14 July 2019.

Team	Year	National League			Munster		All-Ireland		Total	
Team	Year	Division	Apps	Score	Apps	Score	Apps	Score	Apps	Score
Cork	2018	Division 1A	4	0-01	0	0-00	—		4	0-01
Cork	2019	Division 1A	3	0-00	0	0-00	1	0-00	4	0-00
Career total			7	0-01	0	0-00	1	0-00	8	0-01

== Honours ==
Kanturk

- Cork Senior A Hurling Championship (1): 2021 (c)
- All-Ireland Intermediate Club Hurling Championship (1): 2018
- Munster Intermediate Club Hurling Championship (1): 2018
- Cork Premier Intermediate Hurling Championship (1): 2017
- Cork Intermediate Football Championship (1): 2017

Sporting positions
Preceded by Patrick Collins	Cork Under-21 Hurling Captain; 2017	Succeeded by Shane Kingston
