= Paul Walsh (Gaelic footballer) =

Irish Gaelic footballer

Personal information
- Native name: Pól Breathnach (Irish)
- Born: 1997 (age 28–29) Kanturk, County Cork, Ireland

Sport
- Sport: Gaelic Football
- Position: Mid field
Club
- Years: Club
- Kanturk
Club titles
- Cork titles: 0
- All-Ireland Titles: 1
Inter-county
- Years: County
- 2019-present: Cork
Inter-county titles
- Munster titles: 0
- All-Irelands: 0
- NFL: 0
- All Stars: 0

Paul Walsh (born 1997) is an Irish Gaelic footballer who plays for Senior Championship club Kanturk and at inter-county level with the Cork senior football team. He usually lines out in wing forward.

== Honours ==
Kanturk

- Cork Senior A Hurling Championship (1): 2021
- All-Ireland Intermediate Club Hurling Championship (1): 2018
- Munster Intermediate Club Hurling Championship (1): 2017
- Cork Premier Intermediate Hurling Championship (1): 2017
- Cork Intermediate Football Championship (1) 2017

Cork

- National Football League Division 3 (1): 2020
