= Brian O'Sullivan (Cork hurler) =

Irish hurler

Personal information
- Native name: Brian Ó Súilleabháin (Irish)
- Born: 12 January 2002 (age 24) Kanturk, County Cork, Ireland
- Occupation: Student

Sport
- Sport: Hurling
- Position: Midfield
Club
Years	Club	Apps (scores)
2020-present	Kanturk	24 (1-133)
Club titles
- Cork titles: 0
College
- Years: College
- University of Limerick
College titles
- Fitzgibbon titles: 2
Inter-county*
Years	County	Apps (scores)
2023-	Cork	0 (0-00)
Inter-county titles
- Munster titles: 0
- All-Irelands: 0
- NHL: 0
- All Stars: 0
- *Inter County team apps and scores correct as of 17:45, 8 February 2022.

Brian O'Sullivan (born 2002) is an Irish hurler. At the club level he plays with Kanturk, while he is also a member of the Cork senior hurling team.

== Career ==
O'Sullivan first played hurling and Gaelic football at juvenile and underage levels with the Kanturk club, before progressing to adult level as a dual player. He was part of the Kanturk senior hurling team that won the Cork SAHC title after a defeat of Fr. O'Neill's in the 2021 final. He was also part of the Kanturk intermediate football team that won the Cork PIFC title after a defeat of Bantry Blues in 2022. O'Sullivan has also lined out with the University of Limerick and won a Fitzgibbon Cup title in 2022.

O'Sullivan first appeared on the inter-county scene as captain of the Cork minor hurling team in 2018. He later progressed to the under-20 team and won consecutive All-Ireland U20HC titles in 2020 and 2021.

O'Sullivan made his senior team debut during the 2023 National League.

== Career statistics ==
=== Club ===
As of 4 October 2026.

Team	Year	Cork SAHC	
Team	Year	Apps	Score
Kanturk	2020	5	0-13
Kanturk	2021	5	0-34
Kanturk	Total	10	0-47
Kanturk	Year	Cork PSHC	
Kanturk	Year	Apps	Score
Kanturk	2022	3	0-23
Kanturk	2023	4	0-17
Kanturk	2024	4	0-30
Kanturk	2025	3	1-16
Kanturk	2026	5	2-53
Kanturk	Total	19	3-139
Career total		29	3-186

=== Inter-county ===
As of 4 February 2023.

Team	Year	National League			Munster		All-Ireland		Total	
Team	Year	Division	Apps	Score	Apps	Score	Apps	Score	Apps	Score
Cork	2023	Division 1A	1	0-00	0	0-00	0	0-00	1	0-00
Career total			1	0-00	0	0-00	0	0-00	1	0-00

== Honours ==
University of Limerick

- Fitzgibbon Cup: 2022 2023 2025

Kanturk

- Cork Senior A Hurling Championship: 2021
- Cork Premier Intermediate Football Championship: 2022

Cork

- Munster Senior Hurling League: 2023
- All-Ireland Under-20 Hurling Championship: 2020, 2021
- Munster Under-20 Hurling Championship: 2020, 2021

Sporting positions
Preceded by Daniel Hogan	Cork minor hurling team captain 2018	Succeeded by Darragh Flynn
