= Colin Walsh (hurler) =

Irish hurler (born 2003)

Personal information
- Native name: Cóilín Breathnach (Irish)
- Born: 2003 (age 22–23) Kanturk, County Cork, Ireland

Sport
- Sport: Hurling
- Position: Left wing-forward
Club*
Years	Club	Apps (scores)
2021-present	Kanturk	3 (1-03)
Club titles
	Football	Hurling
Cork titles	0	0
Inter-county**
Years	County	Apps (scores)
2023-	Cork	0 (0-00)
Inter-county titles
- Munster titles: 0
- All-Irelands: 0
- NHL: 0
- All Stars: 0
- * club appearances and scores correct as of 21:25, 10 February 2022. **Inter County team apps and scores correct as of 21:25, 10 February 2022.

Colin Walsh (born 2003) is an Irish hurler. At the club level he plays with Kanturk, while he is also a member of the Cork senior hurling team.

== Career ==
Walsh first played hurling and Gaelic football at juvenile and underage levels with the Kanturk club, before progressing to adult level as a dual player. He was part of the Kanturk senior hurling team that won the Cork SAHC title after a defeat of Fr. O'Neill's in the 2021 final. He was also part of the Kanturk intermediate football team that won the Cork PIFC title after a defeat of Bantry Blues in 2022.

Walsh first appeared on the inter-county scene as a member of the Cork minor hurling team in 2019. He later progressed to under-20 level as a dual player, and won a Munster U20FC title in 2021.

Walsh joined the Cork senior hurling team during the pre-season Munster Senior Hurling League.

== Career statistics ==
As of 4 February 2023.

Team	Year	National League			Munster		All-Ireland		Total	
Team	Year	Division	Apps	Score	Apps	Score	Apps	Score	Apps	Score
Cork	2023	Division 1A	0	0-00	0	0-00	0	0-00	0	0-00
Career total			0	0-00	0	0-00	0	0-00	0	0-00

== Honours ==
Kanturk

- Cork Senior A Hurling Championship: 2021
- Cork Premier Intermediate Football Championship: 2022

Cork

- Munster Senior Hurling League: 2023
- Munster Under-20 Football Championship: 2021
