= 1910 Cork Intermediate Football Championship =

Gaelic football competition

- Champions: Kanturk (1st title); P. Carver (captain)
- Runners-up: CYMS

The 1910 Cork Intermediate Football Championship was the second staging of the Cork Intermediate Football Championship since its establishment by the Cork County Board in 1909.

The final was played on 4 September 1910 at the Athletic Grounds in Fermoy, between Kanturk and CYMS, in what was their first ever meeting in the final. Kanturk won the match by 3–04 to 0–01 to claim their first ever championship title.

== Results ==
=== Final ===
4 September 1910 Final	Kanturk	3-04 - 0-01	CYMS	Fermoy Athletic Grounds
