= Aidan Walsh =

Irish hurler & Gaelic footballer (born 1990)

Personal information
- Native name: Aodán Breathnach (Irish)
- Born: 23 January 1990 (age 36) Kanturk, County Cork, Ireland
- Occupation: Hurley maker
- Height: 1.91 m (6 ft 3 in)

Sport
- Football Position: Midfield
- Hurling Position: Full-forward
Clubs
- Years: Club
- 2007–2024 2025–present: Kanturk; An Ghaeltacht
Club titles
	Football	Hurling
Cork titles	2	2
College
- Years: College
- 2008-2015: Cork Institute of Technology
College titles
- Sigerson titles: 0
- Fitzgibbon titles: 0
Inter-county*
Years	County	Apps (scores)
2009–2018 2014-2020	Cork (F); Cork (H)	28 (2-17); 18 (0-08)
Inter-county titles
	Football	Hurling
Munster Titles	2	1
All-Ireland Titles	1	0
League titles	3	0
All-Stars	2	0
- *Inter County team apps and scores correct as of 11:19, 15 July 2019.

Aidan Walsh (born 23 January 1990) is an Irish hurler and Gaelic footballer who played for Cork Championship club Kanturk and at inter-county level with the Cork senior hurling team. He usually lines out as a full-forward. As of 2025 Aidan now plays for An Ghaeltacht in Kerry.

== Playing career ==
=== Cork Institute of Technology ===
In 2011, he helped the Cork Institute of Technology hurling team to their first county final where they played Carrigtwohill. Despite being favourites for the game Carrigtwohill ran out 0–15 to 1–11 winners. Then the GAA barred Walsh, as well as goalkeeper Michael Boyle, from playing for DCU in controversial circumstances.

=== Kanturk ===
Walsh joined the Kanturk club at a young age and played in all grades at juvenile and underage levels as a dual player. His early successes included winning Duhallow Championship titles in 2009 and 2011 after defeats of Rockchapel.

On 11 November 2011, Walsh was at midfield for the Kanturk junior football team that faced Mitchelstown in the final of Cork Junior Championship. He was held scoreless in the game but collected a winners' medal after the 1–20 to 0–04 victory. He ended the game as man of the match.

On 3 November 2013, Walsh was at right wing-forward when the Kanturk intermediate hurling team faced Éire Óg in the final of the Cork Intermediate Championship. He scored 1-01 from play in the 2–22 to 1–12 victory.

The 2017–18 season proved to be a hugely successful one for Walsh and the Kanturk club. After claiming a Cork Premier Intermediate Championship medal with the hurling team following a two-point defeat of Mallow in the final, he later won a Cork Intermediate Championship medal as a footballer following a 0–14 to 0–13 defeat of Mitchelstown in the final. On 19 November 2017, Walsh won a Munster Championship medal with the hurlers after a 1–23 to 0-25 extra-time defeat of Kilmaley in the final. On 4 February 2018, he won an All-Ireland medal after scoring two points in a 1–18 to 1–17 defeat of St Patrick's Ballyragget in the final.

=== An Ghaeltacht ===
As of 2025, with travel having taken its toll and him living in West Kerry, he transferred to the local club, An Ghaeltacht.

=== Cork ===
==== Minor and under-21 ====
Walsh first played for Cork as a member of the minor football team. He made his first appearance on 11 April 2007 and scored six points from right wing-forward in a 0–20 to 0–03 defeat of Waterford. On 1 July, Walsh won a Munster Championship medal after scoring three points in a 1–16 to 2–08 defeat of Kerry in the final.

Walsh became a dual player at minor level in 2008. He made his first appearance for the Cork minor hurling team when he lined out at midfield in a 2–17 to 2–16 defeat by Clare on 30 April 2008. In spite of this defeat, Cork still reached the provincial decider via the play-off route. Walsh was switched to right wing-back and collected a Munster Championship medal after a 0–19 to 0–18 defeat of Tipperary.

On 14 March 2009, Walsh made his first appearance for the Cork under-21 football team. He lined out at centre-back in a 1–17 to 0–09 defeat of Kerry. On 28 March, he won a Munster Championship medal after a 1–09 to 2–05 defeat of Tipperary in the final. Walsh was again at centre-back when Cork faced Down in the All-Ireland final on 4 May. He collected a winners' medal after a 1–13 to 2–09 victory. On 3 June, Walsh made his first appearance for the Cork under-21 team in a 2–22 to 0–25 defeat by Tipperary in the Munster Championship.

On 6 April 2011, Walsh was at midfield for the under-21 footballers when Cork faced Kerry in the Munster Championship final. He collected a second winners' medal after the 2–24 to 0–08 victory. On 3 August, Walsh was at left wing-forward for the Cork under-21 hurling team that faced Limerick in the Munster Championship final. He scored eight points from play in the 4–20 to 1–27 defeat.

==== Senior ====
Walsh made his first appearance for the Cork senior football team on 5 July 2009. He was introduced as a 59th-minute substitute for Ger Spillane in Cork's 2–06 to 0–11 defeat of Limerick in the Munster Championship final. It was his only appearance during the championship, however, he was an unused substitute for Cork's 0–16 to 1–09 defeat by Kerry in the All-Ireland final on 20 September.

On 25 April 2010, Walsh was at midfield for Cork's National League final against Mayo. He scored a point in the 1–17 to 0–12 victory. Walsh was also named at midfield for Cork's All-Ireland final meeting with Down on 19 September. He ended the game with a winners' medal after a 0–16 to 0–15 victory for Cork. Walsh ended the season by winning an All-Star award as well as being named Young Footballer of the Year.

After playing in the early rounds of the National League, Walsh won a second successive winners' medal on 24 April 2011 in spite of missing Cork's 0–21 to 2–14 defeat of Dublin in the final.

Walsh won his third National Football League medal on 29 April 2012. Lining out at full-forward he scored a vital goal when Cork defeated Mayo by 2–10 to 0–11 to win the title. On 8 July, Walsh top scored with 1-01 when Cork defeated Clare by 3–16 to 0–13 to win the Munster Championship. He ended the season by winning a second All-Star award.

In November 2013, Walsh announced that he would line out for both the Cork senior hurling and football teams during the 2014 season. He made his first appearance for the Cork senior hurling team on 15 February 2014 when he lined out at left wing-forward in Cork's 0-17 apiece draw with Limerick in the National League. On 3 July, Walsh won a Munster Championship medal after scoring two points from midfield in Cork's 2–24 to 0–24 defeat of Limerick in the last final to be played at the old Páirc Uí Chaoimh.

On 30 October 2014, Walsh ended his status as a dual player and committed to playing only inter-county hurling during the 2015 season. On 3 May, he was at midfield for Cork's 1–24 to 0–17 defeat by Waterford in the National League final.

Walsh remained with the Cork senior hurling team for the 2016 season as well, however, he rejoined the Cork senior football team in July 2016. At the end of the season he left the Cork senior hurling team and committed to the Cork senior football team for the 2017 season.

After leaving the Cork senior football team at the end of the 2018 season, Walsh announced his intention to make himself available to the Cork senior hurling team for 2019.

== Career statistics ==
Team	Year	National Hurling League			Munster		All-Ireland		Total		National Football League			Munster		All-Ireland		Total	
Team	Year	Division	Apps	Score	Apps	Score	Apps	Score	Apps	Score	Division	Apps	Score	Apps	Score	Apps	Score	Apps	Score
Cork	2009	Division 1	—		—		—		—		Division 2	—		1	0-00	0	0-00	1	0-00
Cork	2010	Division 1	—		—		—		—		Division 1	4	0-03	2	0-00	5	0-03	11	0-06
Cork	2011	Division 1	—		—		—		—		Division 1	4	0-04	3	0-02	2	0-01	9	0-07
Cork	2012	Division 1A	—		—		—		—		Division 1	7	2-09	1	1-01	0	0-00	8	3-10
Cork	2013	Division 1A	—		—		—		—		Division 1	7	1-14	2	0-01	2	1-01	11	2-16
Cork	2014	Division 1B	2	0-03	4	0-05	1	0-01	7	0-09	Division 1	4	0-06	2	0-04	2	0-03	8	0-13
Cork	2015	Division 1A	4	0-03	1	0-00	3	0-02	8	0-05	Division 1	—		—		—		—	
Cork	2016	Division 1A	2	0-01	1	0-00	2	0-00	5	0-01	Division 1	—		—		1	0-01	1	0-01
Cork	2017	Division 1A	—		—		—		—		Division 2	6	0-02	2	0-00	1	0-00	9	0-02
Cork	2018	Division 1A	—		—		—		—		Division 2	—		2	0-00	0	0-00	2	0-00
Cork	2019	Division 1A	6	1-06	4	0-00	0	0-00	10	1-06	Division 2	—		—		—		—	
Cork	2020	Division 1A	5	1-02	0	0-00	2	0-00	7	1-02	Division 2	—		—		—		—	
Career total			19	2-15	10	0-05	8	0-03	37	2-23		32	3-38	15	1-08	13	1-09	60	5-55

== Honours ==
=== Team ===
An Ghaeltacht

- All-Ireland Intermediate Club Football Championship (1) 2026
- Munster Intermediate Club Football Championship (1) 2025
- Kerry Intermediate Football Championship (1) 2025
- West Kerry Senior Football Championship (1) 2025

Kanturk

- Cork Senior A Hurling Championship (1): 2021
- All-Ireland Intermediate Club Hurling Championship (1): 2018
- Munster Intermediate Club Hurling Championship (1): 2017
- Cork Premier Intermediate Hurling Championship (1): 2017
- Cork Intermediate Football Championship (1): 2017
- Cork Intermediate Hurling Championship (1): 2013
- Cork Junior Football Championship (1): 2011

Cork

- All-Ireland Senior Football Championship (1): 2010
- Munster Senior Football Championship (2): 2009, 2012
- Munster Senior Hurling Championship (1): 2014
- National Football League (2): 2010, 2011, 2012
- McGrath Cup (1): 2014
- All-Ireland Under-21 Football Championship (1): 2009
- Munster Under-21 Football Championship (2): 2009, 2011
- Munster Minor Football Championship (1): 2007
- Munster Minor Hurling Championship (1): 2008

Ireland

- International Rules (2): 2011, 2013 (vc)

=== Individual ===
Awards

- All Stars Young Footballer of the Year (1): 2010
- All-Star (2): 2010, 2012
- 96fm/C103 Cork Sports Person of Year (1): 2009

Sporting positions
Preceded by Ciarán McKeever	Ireland International Rules Vice-Captain; 2013-2014	Succeeded by Lee Keegan
Awards
Preceded by Michael Murphy	All Stars Young Footballer of the Year; 2010	Succeeded by Cillian O'Connor
