= 2015 Cork Premier Intermediate Hurling Championship =

- Dates: 16 May 2015 – 11 October 2015
- Teams: 16
- Champions: Newcestown (1st title); John Crowley (captain); Eugene Desmond (manager)
- Runners-up: Valley Rovers; David Lynch (captain); Joe Crowley (manager)

Tournament statistics
- Matches played: 29
- Goals scored: 73 (2.52 per match)
- Points scored: 827 (28.52 per match)
- Top scorer(s): Seán Hayes (4-36)

The 2015 Cork Premier Intermediate Hurling Championship was the 12th staging of the Cork Premier Intermediate Hurling Championship since its establishment by the Cork County Board in 2004. The draw for the opening round of the championship took place at the County Convention on 14 December 2014. The championship began on 16 May 2015 and ended on 11 October 2015.

On 11 October 2015, Newcestown won the championship following a 1-23 to 0-8 defeat of Valley Rovers in the final. This remains their only championship title in the grade.

Mallow's Seán Hayes was the championship's top scorer with 4-36.

== Team changes ==
=== To Championship ===
Promoted from the Cork Intermediate Hurling Championship

- Fermoy

=== From Championship ===
Promoted to the Cork Senior Hurling Championship

- Ballyhea

== Results ==
=== Round 1 ===
| 16 May 2015 Round 1 | Mallow | 2-26 – 1-22 (aet) | Inniscarra | Mourne Abbey |
| | S Hayes 2-13, A Sheehan 0-4, D Relihan 0-3, C Murphy 0-3, Pa Herlihy 0-2, G Hayes 0-1. | | A O'Mahony 0-10, D O'Keeffe 1-0, C Casey 0-4, K Rice 0-2, T O'Connor 0-2, S O'Donoghue 0-2, F Olden 0-1, C Buckley 0-1. | Referee: C Lane (Banteer) |

| 16 May 2015 Round 1 | Courcey Rovers | 1-16 – 0-17 | Bandon | Brinny |
| | D Lordan 0-7, S Nyhan 1-1, T Collins 0-3, G Minihane 0-3, G Moloney 0-2. | | D Crowley 0-8, J Hickey 0-3, R Crowley 0-3, J Harrington 0-1, E O'Donovan 0-1, M McNamara 0-1. | Referee: B Murphy (Carrigtwohill) |

| 17 May 2015 Round 1 | Tracton | 1-13 – 1-16 (aet) | Newcestown | Charlie Hurley Park, Bandon |
| | M O'Sullivan 1-2, R Walsh 0-4, T McGuinness 0-2, J Kingston 0-2, D O'Callaghan 0-2, F Lynch 0-1. | | E Kelly 0-8, L Meade 1-2, J Meade 0-2, D Twomey 0-2, C Keane 0-1, C O'Neill 0-1. | Referee: M Maher (St. Finbarr's) |

| 17 May 2015 Round 1 | Castlelyons | 1-16 – 1-13 | Kanturk | Castletownroche |
| | C Spillane 0-5, A Fenton 1-1, A Spillane 0-3, A O'Sullivan 0-2, R Feeney 0-1, S Moroney 0-1, N O'Leary 0-1, K O'Leary 0-1, T Carroll 0-1. | | A Walsh 0-4, L O'Keeffe 1-0, D Kenneally 0-3, D Dwane 0-1, L McLoughlin 0-1, J Fitzpatrick 0-1, A Nash 0-1, L O'Neill 0-1, M Riordan 0-1. | Referee: T O'Donovan (Douglas) |

| 22 May 2015 Round 1 | Carrigaline | 2-12 – 4-16 | Ballinhassig | Minane Bridge |
| | R O'Shea 1-7, T Murphy 1-3, W O'Brien 0-1, M O'Sullivan 0-1. | D Kirwan (Éire Óg) | R Lombard 2-3, C Reynolds 1-1, F O'Leary 1-1, P Collins 0-4, S McCarthy 0-2, D O'Donovan 0-2, D O'Callaghan 0-1, M Coleman 0-1, D O'Sullivan 0-1. |

| 23 May 2015 Round 1 | Cloyne | 2-11 – 1-16 | Watergrasshill | Caherlag |
| | P O'Sullivan 0-7, C Smith 1-1, B Minihane 1-0, C O'Sullivan 0-1, Diarmuid O'Sullivan 0-1, C Mullins 0-1. | | S O'Regan 0-9, P Cahill 0-4, S O'Leary 1-0, B Halbert 0-1, K O'Neill 0-1, A Cronin 0-1. | Referee: J Larkin (Douglas) |

| 24 May 2015 Round 1 | Fermoy | 2-15 – 1-09 | Valley Rovers | Páirc Uí Rinn, Cork |
| | L Coleman 1-11, J Hutchings 1-1, D Geary 0-3. | | K Canty 1-1, R Butler 0-3, D Crowley 0-2, C O'Leary 0-1, D Looney 0-1, J Cottrell 0-1. | Referee: D Daly (Brian Dillons) |

| 24 May 2015 Round 1 | Blarney | 2-13 – 0-15 | Kilworth | Páirc Uí Rinn, Cork |
| | B O'Connell 1-5, M O'Leary 1-0, M Coleman 0-3, D Dunlea 0-2, J Jordan 0-1, S Mulcahy 0-1, C Murphy 0-1. | | N McNamara 0-7, W Condon 0-3, J Saich 0-2, P Lynch 0-1, P Moakley 0-1, B Tobin 0-1. | Referee: J Bermingham (Bride Rovers) |

=== Round 2 ===
| 12 June 2015 Round 2 | Kanturk | 4-11 – 1-15 | Bandon | Cloughduv |
| | L O'Keeffe 2-5 (2f), A Walsh 1-1, A O'Keeffe 1-0, A Nash 0-2f, D Dwane 0-1, L O'Neill 0-1, C Clernon 0-1. | Report | D Crowley 0-7 (5f), R Crowley 0-5 (3f), J Hickey 1-0, M Sugrue 0-1, J Harrington 0-1, P Crowley 0-1. | Referee: D Daly (Brian Dillons) |

| 13 June 2015 Round 2 | Tracton | 0-18 – 1-10 | Kilworth | Páirc Uí Rinn, Cork |
| | R Walsh (0-9, 8 frees), S Brick (0-4), J Kingston (0-3), M O’Sullivan and J Good (0-1 each). | Report | N McNamara (1-7, 5 frees, 2 65s), P Lynch (0-3). | Referee: J Larkin (Douglas) |

| 14 June 2015 Round 2 | Carrigaline | 3-13 – 1-12 | Valley Rovers | Páirc Uí Ríogáin, Ballinspittle |
| | T Murphy 2-1, D Drake 1-3, R O'Shea 0-6, S O'Brien 0-1, W O'Brien 0-1, P Mullane 0-1. | | R Butler 0-7, D Looney 1-0, J Walsh 0-2, J Cottrell 0-1, G Farrell 0-1, K Canty 0-1. | Referee: B Murphy (Carrigtwohill) |

| 21 June 2015 Round 2 | Inniscarra | 0-15 – 1-15 | Cloyne | Páirc Uí Rinn, Cork |
| | A O'Mahony (f) and C Casey 0-4 each, K Rice 0-3 each, F Olden, K Burke, D O'Connell and J Casey 0-1 each. | Report | Diarmuid O'Sullivan 0-7 (f), C Smith 1-0, A Walsh 0-3, P O'Sullivan 0-3 (2f), D Cahill and C O'Sullivan 0-1 each. | Referee: D Daly (Brian Dillons) |

=== Round 3 ===
| 27 June 2015 Round 3 | Bandon | 1-13 – 0-11 | Kilworth | Páirc Uí Rinn, Cork |
| | R Crowley (0-6, 3 frees), M Sugrue (0-5); J Hickey (1-1); A Murphy (0-1). | Report | N McNamara (0-6, 2 65s, 2 frees); W Condon (0-3); J Saich, P Lynch (0-1 each). | Referee: C Egan (Glen Rovers) |

| 9 July 2015 Round 3 | Inniscarra | 0-05 – 3-20 | Valley Rovers | Cloughduv |
| | A O’Mahony (0-3 frees), T O’Connor and C Casey (0-1 each). | Report | E O’Reilly (0-10, seven frees), C O’Leary (2-3), R Butler (1-0), K Canty (0-3), D Crowley (0-2), W Burke (free) and J Walsh (0-1 each). | Referee: M Maher (St. Finbarr's) |

=== Relegation play-off ===
| 2 October 2015 Play-off | Inniscarra | 2-16 – 1-13 | Kilworth | Mallow GAA Complex, Mallow |
| | D O'Connell 2-3, A O'Mahony 0-8 (5f, 2'65), T O'Connor 0-2, J Casey, C Casey and S O'Callaghan 0-1 each | Report | P Lynch 1-8, (6f, 1 sideline), N McNamara 0-4 (2f), W Condon 0-1. | Referee: B Murphy (Carrigtwohill) |

=== Round 4 ===
| 19 July 2015 Round 4 | Blarney | 1-13 – 1-17 | Newcestown | Páirc Uí Rinn, Cork |
| | M Coleman (0-7, six frees), K Costello 1-0, C Murphy 0-2, M Cronin, D Dunlea, B O’Connell, C Forde 0-1 each. | Report | E Kelly 1-5 (two frees), D Twomey 0-5 (two frees, one 65), L Meade 0-4, G Murphy, T Twomey (free), J Meade 0-1 each. | Referee: N Wall (Carrigaline) |

| 19 July 2015 Round 4 | Tracton | 1-17 – 1-11 | Courcey Rovers | Páirc Uí Rinn, Cork |
| | R Walsh (0-10, 5 frees, 4 65’s); S Brick (1-3, 0-1 sideline); M O’Sullivan and J Kingston (0-2 each). | Report | D Lordan (0-6, 5 frees, 1 65); S Nyhan (1-3); J O’Neill and S Moloney (0-1 each). | Referee: J Larkin (Douglas) |

| 1 August 2015 Round 4 | Valley Rovers | 1-19 – 0-13 | Bandon | Jack Barrett Park, Kinsale |
| | C O’Leary (0-7, two frees, one 65); K Canty (1-4); E O’Reilly (0-5, three frees); D Looney, D Crowley, D Murphy (0-1 each). | Report | D Crowley (0-8, seven frees); A Murphy (0-2), J O’Donovan, M Sugrue, R Crowley (0-1 each). | Referee: D Daly (Brian Dillons) |

| 1 August 2015 Round 4 | Fermoy | 1-14 – 2-12 | Kanturk | Fr. Con Buckley Park, Buttevant |
| | L Coleman 1-7 (0-7f), D Geary 0-2 (0-1 sideline), K Morrisson 0-2, B O'Sullivan 0-2, M Brennan 0-1. | Report | L O'Keeffe 2-2 (0-2f), I Walsh 0-4, A Nash 0-2f, D Kenneally 0-2, D Duane 0-1, M Riordan 0-1. | Referee: T O'Donovan (Douglas) |

| 2 August 2015 Round 4 | Carrigaline | 0-12 – 4-11 | Cloyne | Páirc Uí Rinn, Cork |
| | R O’Shea 0-7 (0-6 fs); W O’Brien 0-3; K Kavanagh, D Drake, 0-1 each. | Report | K Dennehy 2-1; D O’Sullivan 0-5 (0-4 fs, 0-1 65), P O’Sullivan 1-2; I Cahill 1-1; D Cahill, A Walsh 0-1 each. | Referee: M Maher (St. Finbarr's) |

| 15 August 2015 Round 4 | Mallow | 4-16 – 1-12 | Watergrasshill | Killavullen |
| | S Hayes 2-7 (1-0 pen, 0-6f), P Herlihy 1-2, D Relihan 1-2, C Murphy 0-2; P Healy 0-1, P Lyons 0-1, G Hayes 0-1. | Report | A Cronin 1-2; J McCarthy 0-3; S O'Regan 0-3f, S O'Callaghan 0-1, K O'Neill 0-1, N O'Riordan 0-1, D O'Farrell 0-1. | Referee: D Daly (Brian Dillons) |

=== Quarter-finals ===
| 15 August 2015 Quarter-final | Ballinhassig | 4-17 – 1-12 | Castlelyons | Páirc Uí Rinn, Cork |
| | P Collins (1-4, 1 free); C Reynolds (1-3); B Lombard and R Lombard (1-1 each); F O’Leary (0-4); D Donovan (0-2, 1 free); M Collins and D O’Callaghan (0-1 each). | Report | A Spillane (0-7, 4 frees); C Spillane (1-1); A O’Sullivan, M Spillane, A Fenton and J O’Leary (0-1 each). | Referee: M Maher (St. Finbarr's) |

| 30 August 2015 Quarter-final | Tracton | 0-12 – 1-13 | Newcestown | Páirc Uí Rinn, Cork |
| | R Walsh (0-4, 0-4 frees); S Brick (0-3); J Kingston (0-2); M O’Sullivan, J Good, G Kingston (0-1 each). | Report | E Kelly (1-4, 0-3 frees); C Keane (0-3); T Twomey (0-2); J Meade, L Meade, D Twomey, C Dineen (0-1 each). | Referee: T O'Donovan (Douglas) |

| 29 August 2015 Quarter-final | Kanturk | 2-10 – 1-13 | Valley Rovers | Páirc Uí Rinn, Cork |
| | L O’Keeffe 1-2 (two frees), I Walsh 0-3, M Riordan 1-0, A Nash 0-2 (frees), A Walsh, D Kenneally, A O’Keeffe 0-1 each. | Report | C O’Leary 1-3 (two frees, one 65), E O’Reilly (frees), R Butler 0-3 each, B Crowley 0-2, D Murphy, D Looney 0-1 each. | Referee: M Maher (St. Finbarr's) |

| 30 August 2015 Quarter-final | Mallow | 0-18 – 2-09 | Cloyne | Páirc Uí Rinn, Cork |
| | S Hayes (0-6 2 frees, 1 ’65), P Herlihy, K Sheehan (0-3 each), P Lyons (0-2), P Healy, A Sheehan, G Hayes, C Murphy (0-1 each). | Report | A Walsh, K Dennehy (1-0 each), D O’Sullivan (0-5, 4 frees), D Cahill (0-2), G Cahill, C Smith (0-1 each). | Referee: A Cummins (Ballymartle) |

| 4 September 2015 Quarter-final replay | Kanturk | 1-12 – 0-17 | Valley Rovers | Páirc Uí Rinn, Cork |
| | L O'Keeffe 0-5, (2f, 1'65), D Kenneally 1-0, I Walsh and D Duane 0-2 each, A Walsh (sideline), J Fitzpatrick and L McLoughlin 0-1 each | Report | C O'Leary 0-9 (6f), K Canty 0-4, R Butler 0-2, J Cottrell and E O'Reilly (f) 0-1 each | Referee: D Daly (Brian Dillons) |

=== Semi-finals ===
| 12 September 2015 Semi-final | Mallow | 1-16 – 1-18 | Newcestown | Páirc Uí Rinn, Cork |
| | C Murphy (1-3); S Hayes (0-10 frees); P Herlihy, P Lyons, K Sheehan (0-1 each). | Report | L Meade (1-4); D Twomey (0-4, 2 frees); F Keane, E Kelly (0-3 each); M Bradfield (0-2); C Keane, B O’Donovan (0-1 each). | Referee: B Murphy (Carrigtwohill) |

| 19 September 2015 Semi-final | Ballinhassig | 0-15 – 1-14 | Valley Rovers | Páirc Uí Rinn, Cork |
| | D O’Donovan (0-7, frees), S McCarthy, M Collins, F O’Leary, P Collins, P O’Sullivan, R Lombard, C Tyers and D O’Sullivan (0-1 each). | Report | C O’Leary (1-8, four frees), R Butler (0-2), G Farrell, D Looney, J Cottrell and J Walsh (0-1 each). | Referee: C Lyons (Nemo Rangers) |

=== Final ===
| 11 October 2015 Final | Newcestown | 1-23 – 0-08 | Valley Rovers | Páirc Uí Rinn, Cork |
| | D Twomey 1-5 (two frees, one 65), C Keane, S O’Donovan, L Meade, E Kelly (two frees), M Bradfield 0-3 each, J Meade 0-2, C Dineen 0-1. | Report | C O’Leary 0-4 (three frees), K Canty 0-2, J Walsh, D Crowley 0-1 each. | Referee: C McAllister (Aghada) |

== Championship statistics ==
=== Scoring events ===
- Widest winning margin: 24 points
  - Valley Rovers 3-20 – 0-05 Inniscarra (Round 3)
- Most goals in a match: 6
  - Ballinhassig 4-16 – 2-12 Carrigaline (Round 1)
- Most points in a match: 48
  - Mallow 2-26 – 1-22 Inniscarra (Round 1)
- Most goals by one team in a match: 4
  - Ballinhassig 4-16 – 2-12 Carrigaline (Round 1)
  - Kanturk 4-11 – 1-15 Bandon (Round 2)
  - Cloyne 4-11 – 0-12 Carrigaline (Round 4)
  - Mallow 4-16 – 1-12 Watergrasshill (Round 4)
  - Ballinhassig 4-17 – 1-12 Castlelyons (Quarter-final)
- Most goals scored by a losing team: 2
  - Carrigaline 2-12 – 4-16 Ballinhassig (Round 1)
  - Cloyne 2-11 – 1-16 Watergrasshill (Round 1)
  - Cloyne 2-09 – 0-18 Mallow (Quarter-final)
- Most points scored by a losing team: 22
  - Inniscarra 1-22 – 2-26 Mallow (Round 1)

=== Top scorers ===
Top scorer overall

| Rank | Player | Club | Tally | Total | Matches | Average |
|---|---|---|---|---|---|---|
| 1 | Seán Hayes | Mallow | 4-36 | 48 | 4 | 12.00 |
| 2 | Chris O'Leary | Valley Rovers | 4-35 | 47 | 7 | 6.71 |
| 3 | Liam O'Keeffe | Kanturk | 6-14 | 32 | 5 | 6.40 |
| 4 | Eoin Kelly | Newcestown | 2-23 | 29 | 5 | 5.80 |
| 5 | Noel McNamara | Kilworth | 1-24 | 27 | 4 | 6.75 |
| 5 | Ronan Walsh | Tracton | 0-27 | 27 | 4 | 6.75 |
| 6 | Aidan O'Mahony | Inniscarra | 0-25 | 25 | 4 | 6.25 |
| 7 | Liam Coleman | Fermoy | 2-18 | 24 | 2 | 12.00 |
| 8 | Rob O'Shea | Carrigaline | 1-20 | 23 | 3 | 7.66 |
| 8 | Darren Crowley | Bandon | 0-23 | 23 | 3 | 7.66 |

Top scorers in a single game

| Rank | Player | Club | Tally | Total | Opposition |
|---|---|---|---|---|---|
| 1 | Seán Hayes | Mallow | 2-13 | 19 | Inniscarra |
| 2 | Liam Coleman | Fermoy | 1-11 | 14 | Valley Rovers |
| 3 | Seán Hayes | Mallow | 2-07 | 13 | Watergrasshill |
| 4 | Liam O'Keeffe | Kanturk | 2-05 | 11 | Bandon |
| 4 | Paudie Lynch | Kilworth | 1-08 | 11 | Inniscarra |
| 4 | Chris O'Leary | Valley Rovers | 1-08 | 11 | Ballinhassig |
| 5 | Noel McNamara | Kilworth | 1-07 | 10 | Kanturk |
| 5 | Liam Coleman | Fermoy | 1-07 | 10 | Kanturk |
| 5 | Aidan O'Mahony | Inniscarra | 0-10 | 10 | Mallow |
| 5 | Eoin O'Reilly | Valley Rovers | 0-10 | 10 | Inniscarra |
| 5 | Ronan Walsh | Tracton | 0-10 | 10 | Courcey Rovers |
| 5 | Seán Hayes | Mallow | 0-10 | 10 | Newcestown |

=== Miscellaneous ===
- On 16 May 2015, Seán Hayes from Mallow scored 2-13 against Iniscarra. It remains a record individual score for a player.
- After winning the championship title and gaining promotion, Newcestown become the first club from the Carbery Division to have teams in both the senior hurling championship and senior football championship.
