= Sean P. Keating =

Irish-born American politician

Regional Director of United States Post Office
- In office 1961–1966
- Appointed by: John F. Kennedy

Deputy Mayor of New York City
- In office c. 1958 – c. 1961
- Mayor: Robert F. Wagner Jr.

Vice-President of the Board of Standards and Appeals
- In office c. 1950s
- Mayor: Vincent R. Impellitteri

Personal details
- Born: 14 July 1903 Kanturk, County Cork, Ireland
- Died: 2 July 1976 (aged 72) Kanturk, County Cork, Ireland
- Political party: Democratic Party

Military service
- Branch/service: Irish Volunteers (c. 1916–1919); Irish Republican Army (1919–1922); Anti-Treaty IRA (1922–1927)
- Unit: 4th Cork Brigade
- Battles/wars: Irish War of Independence; Irish Civil War

Sean P. Keating (14 July 1903 – 2 July 1976) was an Irish-born American politician who opposed the Anglo-Irish Treaty and later became Deputy Mayor of New York City and Regional Director of the United States Post Office.

Keating was born and raised in Kanturk, County Cork, Ireland. He was a volunteer in the Irish Republican Army (IRA) during the Irish War of Independence. According to an interview he conducted with Columbia University, Keating left school at the age of 13 to join the Irish Volunteers, which later became the IRA, serving in the 4th Cork Brigade. He was arrested by British forces in November 1920 and badly beaten, though Keating later expressed gratitude to a British military doctor who treated his wounds. Keating spent a month in Cork jail and was then interned for a year in Ballykinlar internment camp until December 1921. While interned he participated in several hunger strikes and made several escape attempts.

Following his release, he opposed the Anglo-Irish Treaty and served in the Fianna Cork 4th Brigade on the anti-Treaty IRA side under Sean Moylan during the Irish Civil War against the Irish Free State. Keating subsequently moved to the United States, where he advocated for Irish nationalist causes and the end of Northern Ireland's status as part of the United Kingdom. He was involved in Democratic Party politics and a close associate of Irish-American political activist Paul O'Dwyer and his brother, New York City Mayor William O'Dwyer. Keating was involved in the campaigns of President John F. Kennedy and Senator Robert F. Kennedy.

Keating emigrated to New York City in 1927 and became involved in Irish cultural organizations and Democratic party politics. He was a founder of American Friends of Irish Neutrality, which opposed Irish involvement in World War II, ostensibly fearing it would result in the British reoccupying the Republic of Ireland.

Following World War II, he was chairman of the executive council of the 1947 Irish Race Convention and president of the American League for an Undivided Ireland, lobbying in support of the Fogarty Amendment, which unsuccessfully attempted to tie the release of Marshall Plan funds to the end of Northern Ireland's status as part of the UK.

Between the 1940s and 1960s, he served as president of the County Corkmen Association, president of the United Irish Counties Association, and president of the Irish Institute. In 1956, he served as Grand Marshal of the New York City St. Patrick's Day Parade.

Keating served in various positions under New York City mayors William O'Dwyer, Vincent Impellitteri, and Robert F. Wagner, Jr., rising to the position of Deputy Mayor, under Wagner. He was reportedly the first to publicly introduce future President Kennedy as "the next President of the United States" at an Irish Institute event in 1957. He was appointed Regional Director of the U.S. Post Office by President Kennedy and served in that position from 1961 until his retirement in 1966.

Following President Kennedy's assassination, he served as National Chairman of the President Kennedy Memorial Committee, which secured the lands and raised the funds for the John F. Kennedy Arboretum in New Ross, County Wexford, Ireland.

In retirement, he returned to Kanturk and continued to advocate for the reunification of Ireland. Keating died at his retirement home in Kanturk in 1976 and is buried there with military honors.
