= Chris O'Leary (hurler) =

Irish hurler (born 1997)

Christopher O'Leary
Personal information
- Native name: Criostóir Ó Laoire (Irish)
- Born: 1 May 1997 (age 29) Innishannon, County Cork, Ireland
- Occupation: An Garda Síochana member
- Height: 6 ft 6 in (198 cm)

Sport
- Sport: Hurling
- Position: Centre-back
Club
- Years: Club
- 2015-present: Valley Rovers Lucan Sarsfields
College
- Years: College
- 2015-2019: University College Cork
College titles
- Fitzgibbon titles: 1
Inter-county*
Years	County	Apps (scores)
	Dublin	0 (0-00)
Inter-county titles
- All-Irelands: 0
- NHL: 0
- All Stars: 0
- *Inter County team apps and scores correct as of 22:23, 20 June 2017.

Christopher O'Leary (born 1 May 1997) is an Irish hurler who currently plays as a centre-back for the Dublin senior team.

Born in Innishannon, County Cork, O'Leary first played competitive hurling at Hamilton High School. Here he captained the senior hurling team in the Harty Cup. O'Leary later lined out with University College Cork.

O'Leary first appeared for the Valley Rovers club at juvenile and underage levels as a dual player, winning a county under-21 championship medal as a Gaelic footballer in 2015. He later joined the club's senior team while he also plays for divisional team Carrigdhoun.

O'Leary was seventeen when he was selected for the Cork minor team. He played for one championship season with the minor team. O'Leary subsequently joined the Cork under-21 team. By this stage he had also joined the Cork senior team after making his debut during the 2017 Munster League.

== Career statistics ==
=== Club ===
As of match played 15 September 2018.

Team	Year	Cork PIHC	
Team	Year	Apps	Score
Valley Rovers	2014	4	0-09
Valley Rovers	2015	7	4-35
Valley Rovers	2016	3	1-23
Valley Rovers	2017	4	3-32
Valley Rovers	2018	4	1-23
Valley Rovers	2019	4	0-31
Career total		26	9-153

=== Inter-county ===
As of match played 18 June 2017.

Team	Year	Munster League		National League		Munster		All-Ireland		Total	
Team	Year	Apps	Score	Apps	Score	Apps	Score	Apps	Score	Apps	Score
Cork	2017	3	0-00	2	0-00	0	0-00	0	0-00	5	0-00
Total		3	0-00	2	0-00	0	0-00	0	0-00	5	0-00

== Honours ==
University College Cork

- Fitzgibbon Cup (1): 2019

Cork

- Munster senior hurling championship (2): 2017, 2018
- All-Ireland Intermediate Hurling Championship (1): 2018
- Munster Under-21 Hurling Championship (1): 2018
