= 2022 Cork Premier Intermediate Football Championship =

17th staging of the Cork Premier Intermediate Football Championship

- Dates: 22 July - 23 October 2022
- Teams: 12
- Sponsor: Bon Secours Hospital
- Champions: Kanturk (1st title); Aidan Walsh (captain); Pádraig Kearns (manager)
- Runners-up: Bantry Blues; Ruairí Deane (captain); David O'Donovan (manager)
- Relegated: St. Vincent's

Tournament statistics
- Matches played: 24
- Goals scored: 67 (2.79 per match)
- Points scored: 528 (22 per match)
- Top scorer(s): Mícheál Ó Deasúna (5-21)

The 2022 Cork Premier Intermediate Football Championship was the 17th staging of the Cork Premier Intermediate Football Championship since its establishment by the Cork County Board in 2006. The draw for the group stage placings took place on 8 February 2022. The championship ran from 22 July to 23 October 2022.

The final was played on 23 October 2022 at Páirc Uí Chaoimh in Cork, between Kanturk and Bantry Blues, in what was their first ever meeting in the final. Kanturk won the match by 3-11 to 1-10 to claim their first ever championship title.

Cill na Martra's Mícheál Ó Deasúna was the championship's top scorer with 5-21.

== Team changes ==
=== To Championship ===
Promoted from the Cork Intermediate A Football Championship

- Iveleary

Relegated from the Cork Senior A Football Championship

- Bantry Blues

=== From Championship ===
Promoted to the Cork Senior A Football Championship

- Newmarket

Relegated to the Cork Intermediate A Football Championship

- St. Nicholas'

== Group A ==
=== Group A table ===
Advanced to knockout stage Advanced to relegation play-off

Team	Matches				Score			Pts
Team	Pld	W	D	L	For	Against	Diff	Pts
Iveleary	3	2	0	1	61	36	25	4
Cill na Martra	3	2	0	1	56	40	16	4
Nemo Rangers	3	2	0	1	45	48	-3	4
St. Vincent's	3	0	0	3	26	64	-38	0

=== Group A results ===
24 July 2022 Round 1	Cill na Martra	1-12 - 2-10	Nemo Rangers	Cloughduv Grounds
	M Desmond 0-4 G Golden 1-0, M Dineen 0-3, M Desmond 0-2, D Dineen 0-2, C Furey 0-1.	Report	J O’Donovan 0-4 C O’Donovan 1-0, E Diloughery 1-0, R Dalton 0-3 f, C Dalton, R Corkery, C Kiely 0-1 each.	Referee: S Scanlon (Newcestown)

24 July 2022 Round 1	St. Vincent's	0-08 - 4-10	Iveleary	Brinny Sportsfield
	B Murphy 0-3 (0-1 f), A Harte 0-2, K Sorensen, A Sorensen, G Kelleher 0-1 each.	Report	C O’Leary 3-0, C Vaughan 0-6 (0-3 f), I Jones 1-0, J Creedon (45), D O’Riordan, B Cronin, L O’Sullivan 0-1 each.	Referee: J Forbes (Dohenys)

12 August 2022 Round 2	Cill na Martra	2-17 - 0-16	Iveleary	Castle Grounds
	M Ó Deasúna 1-6 (1-0 p, 0-2 f), M Ó Duinnín 1-0, D Ó Duinnín 0-3, C Mac Lochlainn 0-2, S Ó Duinnín, F Ó hEaluithe, C Ó Meachair, C Ó Duinnín, A Ó Cuana, D Ó hUrdail 0-1 each.	Report	C Vaughan 0-8 (0-4 f), B Cronin 0-4, S O’Riordan 0-2, I Jones, B O’Leary 0-1 each.	Referee: P O'Driscoll

14 August 2022 Round 2	St. Vincent's	0-10 - 3-15	Nemo Rangers	Whitechurch Grounds
	B Murphy 0-4 (2f), M O’Leary 0-2, A Harte, P O’Sullivan, K O’Connor, E Fleming 0-1 each.	Report	C O’Donovan 1-3 (1f), E Mangan 1-2, C Dalton 1-1, R Corkery 0-4 (1f), G Sayers 0-2, E Dilloughery, A McGowan, J O’Donovan 0-2 each.	Referee: E Coleman

4 September 2022 Round 3	Nemo Rangers	0-05 - 4-11	Iveleary	Charlie Hurley Park
	R Corkery 0-3 f, E Mangan, C O’Donovan 0-1 each.	Report	C Óg Jones 3-2 (0-1 f), C Vaughan 0-6 (0-3 f), I Jones 1-1, T Roberts, B O’Leary 0-1 each.	Referee: M Collins

4 September 2022 Round 3	Cill na Martra	2-12 - 1-05	St. Vincent's	Coachford Sportsfield
	M Desmond 2-5 (1-0 pen, 0-2 f), M Dineen 0-3, D Dineen 0-2, C McLoughlin, D Harrington (f) 0-1 each.	Report	B Murphy 0-4 (0-1 f), B Hornibrook 1-0, G McCarthy 0-1.	Referee: A O'Connor (Ballygarvan)

== Group B ==
=== Group B table ===
Advanced to knockout stage

Team	Matches				Score			Pts
Team	Pld	W	D	L	For	Against	Diff	Pts
Bantry Blues	3	3	0	0	53	44	9	6
Aghada	3	2	0	1	49	33	16	4
Castletownbere	3	1	0	2	40	36	4	2
Na Piarsaigh	3	0	0	3	22	51	-29	0

=== Group B results ===
23 July 2022 Round 1	Bantry Blues	2-11 - 1-09	Aghada	Éire Óg Grounds
	R Deane 1-3 (0-1 f), A Coakley 0-4 (0-3 f), K Coakley 1-0, S Keevers, S O’Leary, D Murray, K Harrington 0-1 each.	Report	F Cody 0-4 (0-1 45), A Berry 1-0, D Byrne 0-2, D Creedon 0-2, C Terry 0-1.	Referee: B Coniry (Crosshaven)

23 July 2022 Round 1	Na Piarsaigh	0-04 - 0-10	Castletownbere	Aughaville Grounds
	A Hogan 0-2, K Buckley, C O’Mahony 0-1 each.	Report	G Murphy 0-4 (0-1 f), J Harrington, J Rosales 0-2 each, A O’Sullivan, T Murphy 0-1 each.	Referee: M O'Leary (Diarmuid Ó Mathúna's)

13 August 2022 Round 2	Bantry Blues	3-11 - 0-19	Castletownbere	Adrigole Grounds
	A Coakley 1-4 (0-1 f), R Deane 1-1, P Cronin 1-0, D Murray 0-3, K Coakley 0-2, S O’Leary 0-1 f.	Report	G Murphy 0-8 (0-3 f), F Fenner 0-5 (0-4 f), J Harrington 0-2, T Murphy, J Walsh, A O’Sullivan, D Hanley 0-1 each.	Referee: J Ryan (Macroom)

14 August 2022 Round 2	Aghada	4-13 - 0-05	Na Piarsaigh	Páirc Séamus de Barra
	F Cody 2-3 (2f), C Fleming 1-1, A Berry 1-0, D Creedon 0-5 (5f), T Hartnett, J O’Hanlon, D Byrne, K O’Shea 0-1 each.	Report	C O’Mahony 0-2 (1f), P Guest, K Forde, P Rourke 0-1 each.	Referee: A O'Connor (Ballygarvan)

4 September 2022 Round 3	Aghada	0-12 - 1-08	Castletownbere	St. Mary's Park
	D Creedon (0-5, 0-4 f), F Cody (0-3, 0-2 f), T Hartnett, S Bennett, A Berry and P O’Neill (0-1 each).	Report	F Fenner (1-4, 0-1 f), G Murphy (0-3 f), J Harrington (0-1).

4 September 2022 Round 3	Bantry Blues	2-10 - 0-13	Na Piarsaigh	Sam Maguire Park
	P Cronin 1-4, A Coakley 0-3, D Murray 1-0, S Coughlan, S Thornton, S Keevers 0-1 each.	Report	A Keating 0-7 (0-2 f), S Forde, P Lynch 0-2 each, A Hogan, K Buckley 0-1 each.

== Group C ==
=== Group C table ===
Advanced to knockout stage Advanced to relegation play-off

Team	Matches				Score			Pts
Team	Pld	W	D	L	For	Against	Diff	Pts
Kanturk	3	3	0	0	66	44	22	6
Rockchapel	3	2	0	1	50	47	3	4
Macroom	2	1	0	2	50	39	-11	2
Naomh Abán	3	0	0	3	25	61	-36	0

=== Group C results ===
22 July 2022 Round 1	Macroom	1-11 - 1-12	Rockchapel	Mallow GAA Complex
	F Goold 1-3, D Horgan 0-2 (0-1 f), A Quinn, P Lucey, D Creedon, C Donovan, S Kiely, M Corrigan 0-1 each.	Report	S Hickey 1-1, J Curtin 0-3 (0-1 f), C Curtin (f), W Murphy 0-2 each, S Curtin, J O’Callaghan, N Lenihan, J McAuliffe 0-1 each.	Referee: J Murphy (Castletownroche)

23 July 2022 Round 1	Kanturk	4-13 - 0-09	Naomh Abán	Millstreet Grounds
	Alan Walsh 2-0, R Walsh 1-2, I Walsh 0-5 (0-1 f), C Walsh 0-4 (0-1 f), Aidan Walsh 1-0, T Walsh, P Walsh 0-1 each.	Report	Dónal Ó Ceallaigh 0-3, M Ó Duinnín 0-3 f, Dermot Ó Ceallaigh 0-2, E Ó Criodáin 0-1.	Referee: A Hyland (Kilworth)

13 August 2022 Round 2	Naomh Abán	0-09 - 4-10	Macroom	Cill na Martra Grounds
	M Ó Duinnin 0-4 f, Donal Ó Ceallaigh 0-3 (0-2 f), C Ó Críodáin, N Ó Ceallaigh 0-1 each.	Report	D Horgan 2-3 (0-2 f), C Donovan 1-1, S Kiely 1-0, F Goold 0-3 (0-1 f), P Lucey, A Quinn, E O’Leary 0-1 each.	Referee: L O'Shea

13 August 2022 Round 2	Kanturk	3-17 - 4-09	Rockchapel	Newmarket Grounds
	I Walsh 0-6 (0-5 f), C Walsh 0-4, Aidan Walsh, Alan Walsh 1-1 each, G Bucinskas 1-0, L McLoughlin 0-2, T Walsh, R Walsh, C Clernon 0-1 each.	Report	M McAuliffe 4-0, J Curtin 0-5 (0-4 f), S Hickey, J O’Callaghan, J McAuliffe, J Forrest 0-1 each.	Referee: D Daly (Brian Dillons)

4 September 2022 Round 3	Kanturk	1-12 - 1-11	Macroom	O'Connell Park
	R Walsh 1-1, C Walsh 0-4, I Walsh 0-4 (0-3 f), L McLoughlin, Alan Walsh, L O’Keeffe 0-1 each.	Report	S Kiely 0-4, M Hunt 1-0, A Quinn 0-2, F Goold, D Horgan 0-2 f each, E O’Leary 0-1.

4 September 2022 Round 3	Naomh Abán	0-07 - 1-11	Rockchapel	Dromtarriffe Grounds
	D Ó Ceallaigh 0-3 f, A Ó Luasa 0-2 f, N Ó Ceallaigh, D Ó hAllamháin 0-1 each.	Report	M McAuliffe 1-3, N Linehan 0-2 (0-1 f), D O’Callaghan 0-2, J McAuliffe, P Curtin, J Curtin, C Curtin 0-1 each.

== Knockout stage ==
=== Bracket ===
Quarter-Finals
Cill na Martra (Muskerry)	3-14
Aghada (Imokilly)	1-07
Iveleary (Muskerry)	1-16
Rockchapel (Duhallow)	0-12

Semi-Finals
Kanturk (Duhallow)	1-14
Cill na Martra (Muskerry)	1-13
Bantry Blues (Carbery)	3-13
Iveleary (Muskerry)	1-16

Final
Kanturk (Duhallow)	3-11
Bantry Blues (Carbery)	1-10

=== Relegation playoff ===
17 September 2022 Playoff	St. Vincent's	0-07 - 0-08	Naomh Abán	Cloughduv Grounds
	B Murphy 0-5 (0-4 f), B Long, P O’Sullivan 0-1 each.	Report	A Lucey 0-4 (0-1 f), D Kelly 0-2, N Kelly, M Lyons 0-1 each.	Referee: A O'Connor (Ballygarvan)

=== Quarter-finals ===
17 September 2022 Quarter-final	Cill na Martra	3-14 - 1-07	Aghada	Ballincollig Grounds
	M Ó Deasúna 2-4 (0-1 f), D Ó hUrdail 1-3, D Ó Duinnín 0-3, D Ó Conaill 0-2, S Ó Duinnín, A Ó Loingsigh (mark) 0-1 each.	Report	D Creedon 0-3 (0-1 mark, 0-2 f), J O’Hanlon 1-0, T Hartrnett 0-2, F Cody, C Terry (mark) 0-1 each.	Referee: C Walsh (Nemo Rangers)

18 September 2022 Quarter-final	Iveleary	1-16 - 0-12	Rockchapel	Banteer Sportsfield
	C Óg Jones 0-4 (0-1 f); C Vaughan 0-4 (0-3 f); I Jones 1-0; B Cronin, B O’Leary 0-2 each, S O’Leary, J Creedon (f), C O’Leary, L Kearney 0-1 each.	Report	C Curtin 0-5 (0-4 f), J Curtin, W Murphy, M McAulliffe, J Forrest, K Collins, N Linehan (f), J McAulliffe 0-1 each.	Referee: J Murphy (Castletownroche)

=== Semi-finals ===
1 October 2022 Semi-final	Bantry Blues	3-13 - 1-16	Iveleary	Sam Maguire Park
	A Coakley 2-3 (2f), R Deane 0-5, D McCarthy 1-1, P Cronin 0-3 (1f), S O’Leary 0-1.	Report	C Og Jones 0-4 (1f), S O’Riordan 1-0, C O’Leary 0-3 (1f), L Kearney, B O’Leary 0-2 each, B Cronin 0-1 f, S O’Leary 0–1 mark, C Galvin 0-1, T Roberts, D O’Donovan 0-1 each.	Referee: A O'Connor (Ballygarvan)

1 October 2022 Semi-final	Kanturk	1-14 - 1-13	Cill na Martra	Mallow GAA Complex
	G Bucinskas 1-2; C Walsh 0-4 (0-1f); P Walsh, R Walsh 0-2 each; L McLoughlin, R Cashman (0-1f), I Walsh, C Clemon 0-1 each.	Report	C Ó Duinnín 1-2; M Ó Deasúna (0-1mark), D Ó Duinnín (0-1f), C Ó Fóirréidh 0-2 each; A Ó Cuana, M Ó Duinnín, J Mac Cárthaigh (0-1 45), F Ó hÉalaithe, C Mac Lochlainn 0-1 each.	Referee: J Bermingham (Bride Rovers)

=== Final ===
23 October 2022 Final	Bantry Blues	1-10 - 3-11	Kanturk	Páirc Uí Chaoimh
	P Cronin 1-2, A Coakley 0-5 (0-2 f), S Thornton, S O’Leary 0-1 each, R Deane 0-1 f.	Report	I Walsh 0-5 (0-1 f), Aidan Walsh 1-1, R Walsh, L McLoughlin 1-0 each, P Walsh, C Walsh 0-2 each, G Bucinskas 0-1.	Referee: A O'Connor (Ballygarvan)

== Championship statistics ==
=== Top scorers ===
Overall

Rank	Player	Club	Tally	Total	Matches	Average
1	Mícheál Ó Deasúna	Cill na Martra	5-21	36	5	7.20
2	Arthur Coakley	Bantry Blues	3-19	28	5	5.60
3	Cathal Vaughan	Iveleary	0-24	24	4	6.00
4	Ian Walsh	Kanturk	0-21	21	5	4.20
5	Mickey McAuliffe	Rockchapel	5-04	19	4	4.75
5	Chris Óg Jones	Iveleary	3-10	19	3	6.33
7	Paddy Cronin	Bantry Blues	3-09	18	5	3.60
7	Colin Walsh	Kanturk	0-18	18	5	3.60
9	Fintan Cody	Aghada	2-11	17	4	4.25
10	Ruairí Deane	Bantry Blues	2-10	16	5	3.20
10	Blake Murphy	St. Vincent's	0-16	16	4	4.00

In a single game

Rank	Player	Club	Tally	Total	Opposition
1	Mickey McAuliffe	Rockchapel	4-00	12	Kanturk
2	Chris Óg Jones	Iveleary	3-02	11	Nemo Rangers
2	Mícheál Ó Deasúna	Cill na Martra	2-05	11	St. Vincent's
4	Mícheál Ó Deasúna	Cill na Martra	2-04	10	Aghada
5	Conor O'Leary	Iveleary	3-00	9	St. Vincent's
5	Arthur Coakley	Bantry Blues	2-03	9	Iveleary
5	David Horgan	Macroom	2-03	9	Naomh Abán
5	Fintan Cody	Aghada	2-03	9	Na Piarsaigh
5	Mícheál Ó Deasúna	Cill na Martra	1-06	9	Iveleary
10	Gary Murphy	Castletownbere	0-08	8	Bantry Blues
10	Cathal Vaughan	Iveleary	0-08	8	Cill na Martra
