= 2017 Cork Premier Intermediate Hurling Championship =

- Dates: 30 April 2017 – 8 October 2017
- Teams: 16
- Sponsor: Evening Echo
- Champions: Kanturk (1st title); Lorcan O'Neill (captain); Donagh Duane (manager)
- Runners-up: Mallow; Fionn O'Neill (captain); Joe Buckley (manager)

Tournament statistics
- Matches played: 29
- Goals scored: 77 (2.66 per match)
- Points scored: 874 (30.14 per match)
- Top scorer(s): Chris O'Leary (3-32)

The 2017 Cork Premier Intermediate Hurling Championship was the 14th staging of the Cork Premier Intermediate Hurling Championship since its establishment by the Cork County Board in 2004. The draw for the opening round took place on 11 December 2016. The championship began on 30 April 2017 and ended on 8 October 2017.

On 8 October 2017, Kanturk won the championship following a 0-17 to 1-12 defeat of Mallow in the final. This was their first championship title in the grade.

Chris O'Leary from the Valley Rovers club was the championship's top scorer with 3-32.

== Teams ==
A total of 16 teams contested the Premier Intermediate Championship, including 15 teams from the 2016 premier intermediate championship and one promoted from the 2016 intermediate championship.

== Team changes ==
=== To Championship ===
Promoted from the Cork Intermediate Hurling Championship

- Fr. O'Neill's

=== From Championship ===
Promoted to the Cork Senior Hurling Championship

- Bandon

== Results ==
=== Round 1 ===
30 April 2017 Round 1	Blarney	1-11 - 0-09	Watergrasshill	Páirc Uí Rinn, Cork
	D Cremin 1-2, S Mulcahy 0-3, R Murphy 0-2, M Cremin 0-2, B Hurley 0-1, P Philpott 0-1.	Report	S O'Regan 0-6, D McCarthy 0-1, A Foley 0-1, E Barry 0-1.	Referee: T O'Donovan (Douglas)

30 April 2017 Round 1	Charleville	1-16 - 2-12	Fr. O'Neill's	Páirc Uí Rinn, Cork
	M Kavanagh 1-4, D Fitzgibbon 0-6, D Flynn 0-3, G Kelleher 0-1, S Gleeson 0-1, A Cagney 0-1.		D Dalton 1-3, K O'Sullivan 0-4, C Broderick 1-0, B Dunne 0-2, E Conway 0-2, M O'Keeffe 0-1.	Referee: C Lyons (Nemo Rangers)

30 April 2017 Round 1	Fermoy	1-14 - 3-15	Kilworth	Ballyhooly
	L Coleman 0-7 (0-6f), J Hutchings 1-0, T Clancy 0-2, K Morrisson 0-2, B O'Sullivan 0-1, P de Roiste 0-1, M Brennan 0-1.	Report	N McNamara 3-3, W Condon 0-4, D Twomey 0-3f, J Saich 0-2 (0-1 sideline), E McGrath 0-1, B Sheehan 0-1, J McCarthy 0-1.

30 April 2017 Round 1	Castlelyons	1-13 - 3-12	Kanturk	Castletownroche
	A Spillane 0-8, A O'Sullivan 1-0, N O'Leary 0-2, C Spillane 0-1, E Maye 0-1, C McGann 0-1.		L O'Keeffe 1-3, A O'Keeffe 1-1, D Kenneally 1-0, L McLoughlin 0-2, A Nash 0-2, I Walsh 0-2, R Walsh 0-1, L O'Neill 0-1.	Referee: J Murphy (Castletownroche)

5 May 2017 Round 1	Carrigaline	2-15 - 1-17	Valley Rovers	Minane Bridge
	S O'Brien 1-2, R O'Shea 0-5, D Drake 0-5, B Kelleher 1-1, W O'Brien 0-1, C Maguire 0-1.		C O'Leary 1-10, J Walsh 0-3, J Cottrell 0-3, E O'Reilly 0-1.	Referee: S Stokes (Tullylease)

6 May 2017 Round 1	Courcey Rovers	1-09 - 1-12	Mallow	Ovens
	F Lordan 1-7f, T O'Sullivan 0-1; J O'Neill 0-1.	Report	S Hayes 0-8 (7f), C Murphy 1-1, P Herlihy 0-2; A Sheehan 0-1	Referee: D Kirwan (Éire Óg)

13 May 2017 Round 1	Cloyne	4-07 - 0-17 (aet)	Tracton	Páirc Uí Rinn, Cork
	C O'Sullivan 2-0, K Dennehy 1-1, C Smith 1-0, P O'Sullivan 0-3, A Walsh 0-1, D Cahill 0-1, C Mullins 0-1.		R Walsh 0-9, J Kingston 0-4, S O'Sullivan 0-3, J Good 0-1.	Referee: J Larkin (Douglas)

28 May 2017 Round 1	Ballinhassig	2-15 - 1-14	Inniscarra	Ovens
	S Coleman 1-4, M Collins 1-1, S McCarthy 0-2, C Tyers 0-2, F O'Leary 0-2, C O'Mahony 0-2, R Lombard 0-1, C Reynolds 0-1.	Report	A O'Mahony 0-6, S O'Donoghue 1-2, T O'Connor 0-2, D O'Connell 0-2, C Buckley 0-1, S Dornan 0-1.	Referee: D Daly (Brian Dillons)

=== Round 2A ===
9 June 2017 Round 2A	Cloyne	2-14 - 0-12	Kilworth	Ballynoe
	D Cahill 1-2, K Dennehy 1-1, P O'Sullivan 0-3, B Walsh 0-3, I Cahill 0-2, C O'Sullivan 0-2, D O'Sullivan 0-1.		N McNamara 0-4, D Twomey 0-3, L Whelan 0-2, W Condon 0-1, P Moakley 0-1, J Saich 0-1.	Referee: M Maher (St. Finbarr's)

23 June 2017 Round 2A	Ballinhassig	0-18 - 0-13	Carrigaline	Brinny Sportsfield, Brinny
	F O'Leary 0-5, S Coleman 0-5, C Tyers 0-2, M Collins 0-2, S Sheehan 0-1, P Coomey 0-1, C Desmond 0-1, D O'Sullivan 0-1.		B Kelleher 0-6, R O'Shea 0-2, D Drake 0-2, W O'Brien 0-1, S O'Brien 0-1, P Ronayne 0-1.	Referee: P O'Driscoll (Bride Rovers)

25 June 2017 Round 2A	Blarney	1-21 - 5-18	Mallow	Mourneabbey
	M Coleman 1-8 (1-6f, 1.s/l); C Murphy 0-5, P Philpott 0-2, S Mulcahy 0-2, S Lohan 0-2; D Whyte 0-1, M O'Leary 0-1	Report	S Hayes 1-6 (5f), C Murphy 1-3; P Herlihy 1-2, G Hayes 1-1, D Buckley 1-0, P Lyons 0-3; D Moynihan 0-1, D Relihan 0-1, A Sheehan 0-1.	Referee: J Larkin (Ballinora)

20 August 2017 Round 2A	Charleville	0-21 - 1-22	Kanturk	Fr. Kelleher Park, Kilbrin
	M Kavanagh 0-9 (7 frees, I ’65), D Fitzgibbon 0-7 (2 frees), C Collins (free), J Doyle, J Barry, J Kennedy and A Cagney 0-1 each.	Report	Kanturk: L O’Keeffe 0-7 (frees), L McLoughlin 1-3 (0-2 frees), D Kenneally 0-4, J Browne 0-3, I Walsh 0-2, D Browne, L O’Neil and A Nash (free) 0-1 each.	Referee: D Kirwan (Éire Óg)

=== Round 2B ===
17 June 2017 Round 2B	Fermoy	4-22 - 0-07	Tracton	Riverstown
	J Hutchings 2-2, L Coleman 0-8, M Flynn 1-0, P Clancy 1-0, S Aherne 0-3, J Condon 0-2, M Brennan 0-2, K Morrison 0-2, P de Róiste 0-2, T Clancy 0-1.	Report	R Walsh 0-4, D Byrne 0-1, K Lynch 0-1, A Kiely 0-1.	Referee: C McAllister (Aghada)

23 June 2017 Round 2B	Fr. O'Neill's	5-17 - 3-20	Castlelyons	Killeagh
	E Conway 3-3, B Dunne 1-3, D Dalton 0-4, M Motherway 1-0, J Millerick 0-3, K O'Sullivan 0-2, L O'Driscoll 0-1, S O'Connor 0-1.	Report	C McGann 2-0, M Spillane 0-6, A Fenton 1-1, A Spillane 0-4, C Spillane 0-3, A O'Sullivan 0-3, N O'Leary 0-1, E Maye 0-1, J Barry 0-1.	Referee: G Scully (Killeagh)

24 June 2017 Round 2B	Inniscarra	0-12 - 1-21	Valley Rovers	Cloughduv
	A O’Mahony (0-3 frees), T O’Connor and C Casey (0-1 each).	Report	E O’Reilly (0-10, seven frees), C O’Leary (2-3), R Butler (1-0), K Canty (0-3), D Crowley (0-2), W Burke (free) and J Walsh (0-1 each).	Referee: S Stokes (Tullylease)

24 June 2017 Round 2B	Watergrasshill	3-12 - 2-17	Courcey Rovers	Páirc Liam Mhic Cárthaigh, Ballygarvan
	S O'Regan 0-8, K O'Neill 2-1, D McCarthy 1-0, P O'Regan 0-2, S O'Callaghan 0-1.		F Lordan 0-7, T O'Sullivan 1-1, T Collins 1-1, R Nyhan 0-2, B Collins 0-2, M Collins 0-2, D Lordan 0-1, K Moloney 0-1.	Referee: D Farrell (Mitchelstown)

=== Round 3 ===
16 July 2017 Round 3	Fr. O'Neill's	3-14 - 0-08	Kilworth	Lisgoold
	K O'Sullivan 0-6 (2f, 2 '65'), D Dalton 1-2 (0-1 sideline), E Conway 1-1, E Motherway 1-1, J Millerick 0-1, M Motherway 0-1, C Broderick 0-1, T Millerick 0-1.	Report	D Twomey 0-3f, N McNamara 0-2f, J McCarthy 0-2, W Condon 0-1.	Referee: N Wall (Carrigaline)

19 July 2017 Round 3	Blarney	1-08 - 1-21	Valley Rovers	Páirc Uí Chaoimh, Cork
	M Cremin (0-3, 2 frees, 1 sideline), D Cremen (1-0), M Coleman (0-2 frees), C Power, A McEvoy, S Mulcahy (0-1 each).	Report	C O’Leary (0-12, 7 frees), J Walsh (1-3), J Cottrell (0-3), E O’Reilly (0-2), K Canty (0-1).	Attendance: 10,749

5 August 2017 Round 3	Carrigaline	0-15 - 2-13	Fermoy	Páirc Uí Rinn, Cork
	R O'Shea 0-10, D Drake 0-2, K Kavanagh 0-1, W O'Brien 0-1, B Kelleher 0-1.	Report	L Colemna 0-6, S Aherne 1-0, P Shanahan 1-0, J Hutchings 0-2, R O'Callaghan 0-1, B O'Sullivan 0-1, M Brennan 0-1, P de Róiste 0-1, M Flynn 0-1.	Referee: M Maher (St. Finbarr's)

26 August 2017 Round 3	Charleville	0-19 - 1-11	Courcey Rovers	Coachford
	M Kavanagh 0-6, D Fitzgibbon 0-4, J Barry 0-4, B Dennehy 0-2, J Callaghan 0-1, C Collins 0-1, J Doyle 0-1.	Report	S Moloney 1-1, T O'Sullivan 0-4, J O'Neill 0-2, F Lordan 0-1, R Nyhan 0-1, G Moloney 0-1, T Collins 0-1.	Referee: F Scully (Killeagh)

=== Relegation play-offs ===
26 September 2017 Play-off	Castlelyons	2-18 - 1-15	Tracton	Ovens
	A O'Sullivan 2-3, M Spillane (0-4, 0-3 frees), C McGann (0-3), B Murphy (0-2), J Barry (0-2), A Spillane (0-1), D Lawlor (0-1).	Report	R Walsh 0-6, A Kiely 1-0, J Kingston 0-3, J Good 0-2, C McGuinness 0-2, D O'Flaherty 0-1, E Kingston 0-1.	Referee: S Stokes (Tullylease)

8 October 2017 Play-off	Inniscarra	0-18 - 1-19	Watergrasshill	Mourne Abbey
	S O'Donoghue 0-6, A O'Mahony 0-4, T O'Connor 0-3, Conor Buckley 0-2, D O'Connell 0-2, C Casey 0-1.		S O'Regan 0-7, D O'Farrell 1-2, A Foley 0-3, B Halbert 0-2, D McCarthy 0-1, W Connolly 0-1, K O'Neill 0-1, D O'Riordan 0-1, A Cronin 0-1.

=== Quarter-finals ===
19 August 2017 Quarter-final	Ballinhassig	2-17 - 1-16	Fr. O'Neill's	Clonmult Memorial Park, Midleton
	S Coleman (0-6, 2f, 1 ’65); M Collins (1-2); S Sheehan (1-1); F O’Leary (0-3); P Collins (0-2 frees); P Coomey, D O’Sullivan and C Desmond 0-1 each.	Report	D Dalton (1-5, 1-3 frees); K O’Sullivan (0-5, 2f); E Conway (0-2); S O’Connor, C Broderick, G O’Leary and L O’Driscoll (0-1 each).	Referee: S Stokes (Tullylease)

26 August 2017 Quarter-final	Cloyne	2-19 - 2-12	Fermoy	Páirc Uí Rinn, Cork
	P O'Sullivan 0-8 (7f), C O'Sullivan 1-3, B Walsh 1-1, K Dennehy 0-3; A Walsh 0-1; D Cahill 0-1, I Cahill 0-1, C Smith 0-1.	Report	L Coleman 1-6 (1-0pen, 0-4f, 0-1.65); J Hutchings 1-1, D Geary 0-3, R O'Sullivan 0-1, R O'Sullivan 0-1.	Referee: M Maher (St. Finbarr's)

26 August 2017 Quarter-final	Mallow	0-21 - 0-17	Valley Rovers	Páirc Uí Rinn, Cork
	S Hayes 0-5 (3f), P Herlihy 0-4, D Relihan 0-4; C Murphy 0-3 (1 sl), P Lyons 0-2, K O'Connor 0-1, A Sheehan 0-1, K Sheehan 0-1.	Report	C O'Leary 0-7 (0-5f), E O'Reilly 0-3; A Lyons 0-1, J Cottrell 0-1, J Walsh 0-1, C Desmond 0-1, D Looney 0-1.	Referee: C McAllister (Aghada)

19 September 2017 Quarter-final	Charleville	0-14 - 1-19	Kanturk	Milford Pitch, Milford
	M Kavanagh 0-9 (0-8f. 0-1'65) D Fitzgibbon 0-7 (0-2f) A Cagney 0-1, J Barry 0-1, J Doyle 0-1, J Kennedy 0-1, C Collins 0-1f.	Report	L O'Keeffe 0-9f, L McLoughlan 1-2 (0-1f) D Kenneally 0-4, J Browne 0-3, I Walsh 0-1, L O'Neill 0-1, D Browne 0-1, A Nash 0-1f	Referee: D Kirwan (Éire Óg)

=== Semi-finals ===
16 September 2017 Semi-final	Cloyne	1-12 - 1-16	Mallow	Páirc Uí Rinn, Cork
	P O'Sullivan 0-7, C O'Sullivan 1-2, K Dennehy 0-1, B Walsh 0-1, D O'Sullivan 0-1.	Report	A Sheehan 1-5, S Hayes 0-5, C Murphy 0-4, P Herlihy 0-1, K Sheehan 0-1.	Referee: S Stokes (Tullylease)

16 September 2017 Semi-final	Ballinhassig	1-14 - 2-14	Kanturk	Páirc Uí Rinn, Cork
	S Coleman 0-6 (5f), R Lombard 1-1, F O'Leary 0-3, S McCarthy 0-2; M Collins 0-1, C Desmond 0-1.	Report	L McLoughlin 1-3 (0-2f), R Walsh 0-4; D Kenneally 1-0, L O'Keeffe 0-3 (2f), A Sheehy 0-1, I Walsh 0-1, A Nash 0-1 (f); M Healy 0-1.	Referee: M Maher (St. Finbarr's)

=== Final ===
8 October 2017 Final	Kanturk	0-17 - 1-12	Mallow	Páirc Uí Rinn, Cork
	L McLoughlin (0-8, 0-4 frees), A Walsh (0-3), I Walsh (0-2), R Walsh, L O’Keeffe (free), D Kenneally and A Sheehy (0-1 each).		G Hayes (1-1), D Relihan (0-4), S Hayes (0-3 frees), K O’Connor (free), P Lyons, C Murphy and K Sheehan (0-1 each).	Referee: C McAllister (Aghada)

== Championship statistics ==
=== Scoring events ===
- Widest winning margin: 27 points
  - Fermoy 4-22 - 0-07 Tracton (Round 2B)
- Most goals in a match: 8
  - Fr. O'Neill's 5-17 - 3-20 Castlelyons (Round 2B)
- Most points in a match: 43
  - Kanturk 1-22 - 0-21 Charleville (Round 2A)
- Most goals by one team in a match: 5
  - Fr. O'Neill's 5-17 - 3-20 Castlelyons (Round 2B)
  - Mallow 5-18 - 1-21 Blarney (Round 2A)
- Most goals scored by a losing team: 3
  - Castlelyons 3-2- - 5-17 Fr. O'Neill's (Round 2B)
- Most points scored by a losing team: 21
  - Blarney 1-21 - 5-18 Mallow (Round 2A)
  - Charleville 0-21 - 1-22 Kanturk (Round 2A)

=== Top scorers ===
Top scorer overall

Rank	Player	Club	Tally	Total	Matches	Average
1	Chris O'Leary	Valley Rovers	3-32	41	4	10.25
2	Mark Kavanagh	Charleville	1-28	31	4	7.75
3	Seán Hayes	Mallow	1-27	30	5	6.00
3	Liam Coleman	Fermoy	1-27	30	4	7.50
4	Lorcán McLoughlin	Kanturk	3-18	27	5	5.40
5	Liam O'Keeffe	Kanturk	1-23	26	5	5.20
6	Seán Coleman	Ballinhassig	1-21	24	4	6.00
6	Shane O'Regan	Watergrasshill	0-24	24	3	8.00
6	Darragh Fitzgibbon	Charleville	0-24	24	4	6.00
7	Declan Dalton	Fr. O'Neill's	3-14	23	4	5.75

Top scorers in a single game

Rank	Player	Club	Tally	Total	Opposition
1	Chris O'Leary	Valley Rovers	1-10	13	Carrigaline
2	Noel McNamara	Kilworth	3-03	12	Fermoy
2	Eoin Conway	Fr. O'Neill's	3-03	12	Castlelyons
2	Chris O'Leary	Valley Rovers	1-10	13	Blarney
3	Mark Coleman	Blarney	1-08	11	Mallow
4	Fergus Lordan	Courcey Rovers	1-07	10	Mallow
4	Shane O'Regan	Watergrasshill	0-10	10	Inniscarra
4	Eoin O'Reilly	Valley Rovers	0-10	10	Inniscarra
4	Rob O'Shea	Carrigaline	0-10	10	Fermoy
5	Chris O'Leary	Valley Rovers	2-03	9	Inniscarra
5	Aidan O'Sullivan	Castlelyons	2-03	9	Tracton
5	Seán Hayes	Mallow	1-06	9	Blarney
5	Liam Coleman	Fermoy	1-06	9	Cloyne
5	Mark Kavanagh	Charleville	0-09	9	Kanturk
5	Ronan Walsh	Tracton	0-09	9	Cloyne
5	Mark Kavanagh	Charleville	0-09	9	Kanturk
5	Liam O'Keeffe	Kanturk	0-09	9	Charleville

=== Miscellaneous ===
- On 19 July 2017, Valley Rovers and Blarney contest the first competitive club game at the newly-refurbished Páirc Uí Chaoimh.
- Kanturk become the first team from the Duhallow Division to gain promotion to the Cork Senior Hurling Championship.
