= 2017–18 All-Ireland Intermediate Club Hurling Championship =

Championship Details
- Dates: 1 October 2017 – 4 February 2018
- Teams: 23

All Ireland Champions
- Winners: Kanturk (1st win)
- Captain: Lorcan O'Neill
- Manager: Donagh Duane

All Ireland Runners-up
- Runners-up: St. Patrick's Ballyragget
- Captain: Stephen Staunton
- Manager: Jim Lyng

Provincial Champions
- Munster: Kanturk
- Leinster: St. Patrick's Ballyragget
- Ulster: Middletown Na Fianna
- Connacht: Tooreen

Championship Statistics
- Matches Played: 22
- Total Goals: 58 (2.6 per game)
- Total Points: 682 (31.o per game)

The 2017–18 All-Ireland Intermediate Club Hurling Championship was the 14th staging of the All-Ireland Intermediate Club Hurling Championship, the Gaelic Athletic Association's intermediate inter-county club hurling tournament. The championship began on 1 October 2017 and ended on 4 February 2018.

On 4 February 2018, Kanturk won the championship following a 1–18 to 1–17 defeat of St. Patrick's Ballyragget in the All-Ireland final. This was their first All-Ireland title in the grade.

== Connacht Intermediate Club Hurling Championship ==
=== Connacht semi-final ===
| 30 October 2017 Semi-final | Pádraig Pearses | 1–11 – 1–21 | Tooreen | Athleague Sportsfield |
| | D Glynn 0-8, D Staunton 1-1, K Feehilly 0-1, T Cogavin 0-1. | | S Boland 0-8, K Feeney 0-5, F Boland 0-4, D Harrison 1-0, B Morley 0-3, S Regan 0-1. | Referee: J Keane (Galway) |

=== Connacht final ===
| 5 November 2017 Final | Tooreen | 1–15 – 1–11 | Ballinderreen | Athleague Sportsfield |
| | S Boland 0-7, K Feeney 0-4, C Freeman 1-0, F Boland 0-3, C Charlton 0-1. | | S Larkin 1-1, O Burke 0-3, K Lane 0-3, R Lane 0-2, R Lane 0-1, D O'Connor 0-1. | Referee: P O'Dwyer (Carlow) |

== Leinster Intermediate Club Hurling Championship ==
=== Leinster quarter-finals ===
| 4 November 2017 Quarter-final | Kiltale | 1–22 – 1–15 | The Harps | Páirc Tailteann |
| | J Regan (1-9, 0-6fs, 2 65s), C O’Sullivan (0-3), M O’Sullivan (0-3); P Durnin (0-2), C McCabe (0-2), P Kelly (0-2); A Forde (0-1). | Report | P Delaney (0-7, 6fs), B Clancy (1-0), C Dunne (0-2 fs), C Comerford (0-2), R Saunders (0-1); J Brophy (0-1), R Young (0-1). | Referee: Chris Mooney (Dublin) |

| 4 November 2017 Quarter-final | Ardclough | 1–08 – 0–24 | St. Patrick's Ballyragget | St Conleth's Park |
| | M Fitzgerald 1-5 (0-5f), C Buggy 0-2, P Ryan 0-1. | Report | K Kelly 0-11 (9f), M Brennan 0-5, BB Phelan 0-2, S Kenny 0-2, J Brennan 0-1, B Staunton 0-1, S Mooney 0-1, G Morrissey 0-1. |

| 4 November 2017 Quarter-final | Thomas Davis | 2–10 – 2–12 | Glenealy | Parnell Park |
| | K Ward 0-04 (2f), D Kerr 1-01, C Murphy 1-00, L Sinnott 0-02, E O'Toole 0-01, C Molloy 0-01, T O'Dwyer 0-01. | Report | J O'Neill Snr 0-06 (6f), A Driver 1-00, J O'Neill Jnr 1-00, D Staunton 0-03, J Manley 0-01, J Byrne 0-01, P O'Brien 0-01. |

=== Leinster Semi-finals ===
| 18 November 2017 Semi-final | Kiltale | 2–10 – 2–20 | St. Patrick's Ballyragget | Páirc Tailteann |
| | J Regan (0-9, 8fs, 1 65), F McCabe (1-0), J Kelly (1-0), A Forde (0-1), S Ryan (0-1). | Report | K Kelly (0-12, 7fs, 2 65s), C Delaney (1-1), S Kenny (1-0), J Brennan (0-3), M Brennan (0-2), P Brennan (0-1), R Healy (0-1). | Referee: Richie Fitzsimons (Offaly) |

| 18 November 2017 Semi-final | Glenealy | 1–14 – 2–08 | St. Anne's Rathangan | Aughrim County Ground |
| | J O'Neill Snr. (0-10, 9 frees), J O'Neill Jnr. (1-1), L Glynn (0-2), J Byrne (0-1). | Report | D O'Keeffe (1-5, 0-2 frees), L Rochford (1-1), M Furlong (0-2 frees). | Referee: Michael O'Sullivan (Kilkenny) |

=== Leinster final ===
| 2 December 2017 Final | St. Patrick's Ballyragget | 0–19 – 1–15 | Glenealy | Nowlan Park |
| | K Kelly (0–11); S Kenny, M Brennan, B Phelan (0–2 each); J Brennan, P Brennan (0–1 each). | Report | J O’Neill (0–8); W O’Gorman (1–0); R Byrne (0–2); J Manley, J Byrne, E Glynn, L Glynn, G Weir (0–1 each). | Referee: Sean Stack (Dublin) |

== Munster Intermediate Club Hurling Championship ==
=== Munster quarter-finals ===
| 22 October 2017 Quarter-final | Kanturk | 2–17 – 0–11 | St. Mary's | Mallow GAA Complex |
| | D Kenneally 1–3; L O'Keeffe 0–5 (0-3f), I Walsh 0–5, M Healy 1–1, L McLoughlin 0-1f, R Walsh 0–1; D O'Connor 0–1. | Report | Seamus Kennedy 0–3 (0-2f); J Lonergan 0–3, Sean Kennedy 0-2f, M Barlow 0–1, G Ryan 0–1, E Walsh 0–1. | Referee: T Walsh (Waterford) |

| 22 October 2017 Quarter-final | Kilmaley | 1–20 – 0–22 (aet) | Murroe-Boher | Cusack Park |
| | D Keane 1-4, C Moloney 0-6, M O'Malley 0-3, S O'Loughlin 0-2, M O'Neill 0-2, K Kennedy 0-1, A McGuane 0-1, S Kennedy 0-1. | Report | S Tobin 0-12, D Sheehan 0-3, J Casey 0-2, P Tobin 0-1, C Byrnes 0-1, D O'Connor 0-1, D Byrnes 0-1, K Cusack 0-1. | Referee: J McCormack (Tipperary) |

=== Munster semi-finals ===
| 5 November 2017 Semi-final | Ballyduff | 2–12 – 1–20 | Kanturk | Austin Stack Park |
| | P Boyle (1–5, 5 frees), P O’Carroll ( 1–0), D Goulding and M Boyle ( 0–2 each), A O’Carroll, A Boyle and J Goulding ( 0–1 each) | Report | I Walsh (1–4), L O’Keeffe (0–5, 3 frees) L O’Neill and A O’Keeffe (0–3 each), A Walsh (0–2), L McLoughlin (0–2, 1free, 1 ’65), J Fitzpatrick (0–1) | Referee: R McGann (Clare) |

| 5 November 2017 Semi-final | Kilmaley | 0–24 – 1–08 | An Rinn | Cusack Park |
| | C Moloney 0-5, E Bracken 0-4, M O'Neill 0-4, D Keane 0-3, M O'Malley 0-3, S O'Loughlin 0-3, P McNamara 0-2. | Report | F Ó Currín 1-0, D Ó Breathnach 0-3, N Ó Murchadha 0-1, F Ó hAodha 0-1, T Ó hUallacháin 0-1, L Ó Lonáin 0-1, C Breathnach 0-1. | Referee: N Wall (Cork) |

=== Munster final ===
| 19 November 2017 Final | Kanturk | 1–23 – 0–25 (aet) | Kilmaley | Gaelic Grounds |
| | L O’Keeffe 1–7 (0-4f, 1’65); L McLoughlin 0–4; I Walsh 0–3; R Walsh 0–2; M Healy, A O’Keeffe, A Sheehy, A Walsh, D Browne, J Fitzpatrick, P Walsh 0–1 each | Report | C Moloney 0–7 (0-5f); M O’Malley (0-1f, 0–1’65), D Keane 0–5 each; É Bracken, K Kennedy, M O’Neill 0–2 each; S O’Loughlin, B Cahill 0–1 each. | Referee: T Walsh (Waterford) |

== Ulster Intermediate Club Hurling Championship ==
=== Ulster quarter-finals ===
| 1 October 2017 Quarter-final | Castleblayney Hurling Club | 0–11 – 1–27 | Patrick Sarsfields | St. Mary's Park |
| | F Rafter 0-6, B McGuigan 0-2, H Byrne 0-1, M Treanor 0-1. | | K McKernan 0-11, N McKenna 0-8, D McKernan 1-3, T Doherty 0-2, D McGuinness 0-1, N McAlea 0-1, J McKernan 0-1, G Lennon 0-1. |

| 1 October 2017 Quarter-final | Lavey | 4–25 – 0–10 | Liatroim Fontenoys | Celtic Park |

=== Ulster semi-finals ===
| 8 October 2017 Semi-final | Lavey | 3–16 – 2–17 | Patrick Sarsfields | Davitt Park |
| | P Henry 0-10 (9f), C O'Boyle 2-2, S Dodds 1-1, L Murphy 0-1, B Dodds 0-1, C Dillon 0-1. | Report | K McKernan 0-13 (8f), J McKernan 1-1, T Doherty 1-0, D McKernan 0-3. |

| 8 October 2017 Semi-final | Middletown Na Fianna | 2–20 – 2–13 (aet) | Eire Óg Carrickmore | Corrigan Park |

=== Ulster final ===
| 22 October 2017 Final | Lavey | 2–13 – 2–16 | Middletown Na Fianna | Corrigan Park |
| | P Henry 1-11, M Murphy 1-0, C Murphy 0-1, N Toner 0-1. | | R Gaffney 0-9, C Carvill 1-2, M Maguire 1-2, P McBride 0-2, K McKernan 0-1. | Referee: J Connors (Cavan) |

== All-Ireland Intermediate Club Hurling Championship ==
=== All-Ireland quarter-final ===
| 2 December 2017 Quarter-final | Kilburn Gaels | 2–08 – 2–17 | Kanturk | McGovern Park |
| | S Lambert (1–6, 1–6 frees); J Troy (1–1); K Kennedy (0–1). | Report | L O’Keeffe (1–5, 0–4 frees, 0–1 ‘65); I Walsh (0–4); L McLoughlin (1–0); A Walsh (0–1 sc), L O’Neill (0–2 each); R Walsh, D Kennelly, A O’Keeffe, D O’Donoghue (0–1 each). |

=== All-Ireland semi-finals ===
| 20 January 2018 Semi-final | Tooreen | 1–09 – 3–14 | St. Patrick's Ballyragget | Cusack Park |
| | S Boland 0–4 (4 frees), C Charlton 1–0, K Feeney 0–3 (3 frees), C Freeman 0–2. | Report | J Brennan 2–2, M Brennan 0–7 (5 frees, 2 ’65), E Bergin 1–1, B Staunton 0–2, B Phelan and S Kenny 0–1 each. | Referee: R McGann (Clare) |

| 27 January 2018 Semi-final | Kanturk | 3–13 – 0–12 | Middletown Na Fianna | St. Conleth's Park |
| | L McLoughlin 0–7 (four frees); A Nash 1–1 (1–0 Pen, 0–1 free); A O’Keeffe, J Fitzpatrick 1–0 each; A Walsh 0–2; I Walsh, J Browne, L O’Neill 0–1 each. | Report | R Gaffney 0–6 frees; K McKernan 0–2; N Curry (one free), M Maguire, C Carvill, D Carvill 0–1 each. | Referee: G McGrath (Wexford) |

=== All-Ireland final ===
| 4 February 2018 Final | St. Patrick's Ballyragget | 1–17 – 1–18 | Kanturk | Croke Park |
| | K Kelly (0–8, 0–7 frees); S Kenny (0–5); J Brennan (0–3); M Brennan (1–0). | Report | L McLoughlin (0–7, 0–5 frees); R Walsh (1–2); I Walsh (0–3); A Nash (0–2 frees), A Walsh (0–2 each); D Kenneally, A O’Keeffe (0–1 each). | Referee: J Murphy (Limerick) |

== Championship statistics ==
=== Miscellaneous ===
- Glenealy became the first club from Wicklow to qualify for a Leinster final in any grade of hurling.
- The All-Ireland semi-final between Kanturk and Middletown Na Fianna, originally scheduled for 21 January, was postponed due to adverse weather conditions.
