= 2021 Cork Senior A Hurling Championship =

Annual hurling competition season

- Dates: 11 September - 21 November 2021
- Teams: 12
- Sponsor: Co-Op Superstores
- Champions: Kanturk (1st title); Darren Browne (captain); Tom Walsh (manager)
- Runners-up: Fr. O'Neill's; Tomás Millerick (captain); Robbie Dalton (manager)
- Relegated: Bandon

Tournament statistics
- Matches played: 23
- Goals scored: 54 (2.35 per match)
- Points scored: 779 (33.87 per match)
- Top scorer(s): Mark Coleman (1-38)

The 2021 Cork Senior A Hurling Championship was the second staging of the Cork Senior A Hurling Championship since its establishment by the Cork County Board in 2020. The draw for the group stage placings took place on 29 April 2021. The championship began on 11 September 2021 and ended on 21 November 2021.

The final was played on 21 November 2021 at Páirc Uí Chaoimh in Cork, between Kanturk and Fr. O'Neill's, in what was their first meeting in a final. Kanturk won the match by 3–17 to 2–13 to claim their first championship title.

Blarney's Mark Coleman was the championship's top scorer with 1-38.

== Team changes ==
=== To Championship ===
Relegated from the Cork Premier Senior Hurling Championship

- Ballyhea

Promoted from the Cork Premier Intermediate Hurling Championship

- Blarney

=== From Championship ===
Promoted to the Cork Premier Senior Hurling Championship

- Charleville

Relegated to the Cork Premier Intermediate Hurling Championship

- Kilworth

== Participating teams ==
The seedings were based on final group stage positions from the 2020 championship.

Top seeds Second seeds Third seeds Fourth seeds

Team	Location	Colours	Seeding
Ballyhea	Ballyhea	Black and white	1
Fr. O'Neill's	Ballymacoda	Green and red	2
Kanturk	Kanturk	Green and yellow	3
Newcestown	Newcestown	Red and yellow	4
Bride Rovers	Rathcormac	Green, white and yellow	5
Bandon	Bandon	Yellow and white	6
Fermoy	Fermoy	Black and yellow	7
Cloyne	Cloyne	Red and black	8
Ballymartle	Riverstick	Green and yellow	9
Mallow	Mallow	Red and yellow	10
Killeagh	Killeagh	Green and white	11
Blarney	Blarney	Red and white	12

== Group A ==
=== Table ===
Advance to knockout stage

Team	Matches				Score			Pts
Team	Pld	W	D	L	For	Against	Diff	Pts
Kanturk	3	2	1	0	3-57	0-43	23	5
Blarney	3	2	1	0	1-58	2-38	17	5
Fermoy	3	1	0	2	2-47	1-62	-12	2
Bandon	3	0	0	3	0-41	3-60	-28	0

=== Results ===
11 September 2021 Round 1	Fermoy	1-14 - 0-22	Blarney	Riverstown Sportsfield
	L Coleman 0-8 (0-7 f), T Clancy 1-0, A Creed 0-2, S Ahern, K Morrisson, J Carr, R O’Hagan 0-1 each.	Report	M Coleman 0-10 (0-6 f, 0-1 65), P Power (0-1 f), D McSweeney 0-3 each, S Barrett, D Hanlon 0-2 each, A McEvoy, E Kirby 0-1 each.	Referee: B Sweeney (Erin's Own)

11 September 2021 Round 1	Kanturk	1-21 - 0-13	Bandon	Coachford Sportsfield
	B O’Sullivan 0-9 (0-7 f), Aidan Walsh 0-6 (0-1 sideline), Alan Walsh 1-0, L O’Keeffe, I Walsh 0-2 each, J Browne, L O’Neill 0-1 each.	Report	A O’Mahony 0-6 f, M Cahalane 0-2 (0-1 f), C Calnan, A Murphy 0-2 each, E McSweeney 0-1.	Referee: D Daly (Brian Dillons)

17 September 2021 Round 2	Blarney	0-15 - 1-12	Kanturk	Mallow GAA Complex
	M Coleman 0-8 (0-5 f, 0-1 sl); P Power 0-3 (0-1f); S Barrett, M O’Leary, K Costello, D Hannon 0-1 each.	Report	B O’Sullivan 0-7 (0-5 f); C Walsh 1-1; Aidan Walsh 0-2; I Walsh, J Browne 0-1 each.	Referee: C McAllister (Aghada)

18 September 2021 Round 2	Bandon	0-16 - 1-18	Fermoy	Blarney GAA Grounds
	A O’Mahony 0-11 (0-9 f), M Cahalane, D Crowley 0-2 each, A Murphy 0-1.	Report	J Carr 0-10 (0-6 f), A Creed 1-1, M Brennan, B O’Sullivan 0-2 each, P Murphy, K Morrison, S Aherne 0-1 each.	Referee: A Hyland (Kilworth)

10 October 2021 Round 3	Bandon	0-12 - 1-21	Blarney	Inniscarra GAA Grounds
	A O’Mahony 0-10 (0-7 f, 0-1 65), R Desmond, A Murphy 0-1 each.	Report	M Coleman 0-9 (0-6 f, 0-1 sl), K Costello 1-0, P Power (0-1 f), P Crowley 0-3 each, S Barrett 0-2, A McEvoy, D Hannon, E Kirby, C Power 0-1 each.	Referee: B Murphy (Carrigtwohill)

10 October 2021 Round 3	Kanturk	1-24 - 0-15	Fermoy	Fr. Con Buckley Park
	B O’Sullivan 0-10 (0-3 65, 0-4 f), Alan Walsh 1-1, L McLoughlin, I Walsh, Aidan Walsh 0-3 each, R Walsh 0-2, L O’Neill and D Browne 0-1 each.	Report	J Carr 0-5 (0-4 f), M Brennan, S Aherne, P De Roiste 0-2 each, K Morison, T Clancy, R O’Hagan, J Molloy 0-1 each.

== Group B ==
=== Table ===
Advance to knockout stage Advance to relegation play-off

Team	Matches				Score			Pts
Team	Pld	W	D	L	For	Against	Diff	Pts
Bride Rovers	3	2	0	1	2-50	3-32	15	4
Mallow	3	2	0	1	4-44	6-43	-5	4
Ballymartle	3	1	1	1	7-45	2-50	10	3
Ballyhea	3	0	1	2	1-47	3-61	-20	1

=== Results ===
12 September 2021 Round 1	Ballyhea	0-12 - 1-25	Bride Rovers	Castletownroche
	John Morrissey 0-8 (0-7 f, 0-1 65), K Hanley, M O’Sullivan, L Crowley, E O’Leary 0-1 each.	Report	C Barry 0-11 (0-8 f, 0-1 65), C O’Connor 1-1, M Collins, B Roche 0-3 each, P O’Flynn and D Dooley 0-2 each, E Roche, K Kearney, Jason Mannix 0-1 each.	Referee: S Stokes

12 September 2021 Round 1	Ballymartle	5-16 - 1-17	Mallow	Blarney
	D McCarthy (2-5, 0-3 frees), L O’Callaghan (1-2), S O’Mahony (0-4, 1 free), S Cummins (1-1), B Corry (1-0), J Dwyer (0-2), A Gould and E O’Leary (0-1 each).	Report	G Sweeney (0-12, 9 frees, 1 ’65), D Hayes (1-0), R Sheehan and P Lyons (0-2 each), S O’Callaghan (0-1).	Referee: B Murphy (Carrigtwohill)

18 September 2021 Round 2	Mallow	0-18 - 1-11	Ballyhea	Fr. Con Buckley Park
	A Sheehan 0-9 f, S Hayes, P Lyons 0-3 each, R Sheehan 0-2, J O’Hanlon 0-1.	Report	P O’Callaghan 0-8 (0-3 f, 0-1 65), E O’Leary 1-2, J Morrissey 0-1.	Referee: J Murphy (Castletownroche)

18 September 2021 Round 2	Bride Rovers	1-09 - 0-11	Ballymartle	Riverstown Sportsfield
	B Roche 1-2, C Barry 0-4 f, D Dooley, P O'Flynn, S O'Connor 0-1 each.	Report	D McCarthy 0-6 (0-5 f), B Corry 0-3, S Dorney and S Cummins 0-1 each.	Referee: M Maher (St. Finbarr's)

10 October 2021 Round 3	Bride Rovers	0-16 - 3-09	Mallow	Kildorrery GAA Grounds
	B Roche 0-5, W Finnegan 0-4 f, C Barry 0-3 f, C O'Connor 0-2 (0-1 f), S O'Connor 0-1, E Roche 0-1 each.	Report	S Hayes 3-1 (1-0 pen), A Sheehan 0-6 (0-5 f), P Lyons, M Tobin 0-1 each.

10 October 2021 Round 3	Ballyhea	0-24 - 2-18	Ballymartle	Banteer Sportsfield
	P O’Callaghan 0-15 (0-7 f), John Morrissey 0-5, E O’Leary 0-2, Jack Morrissey, C Cox 0-1 each.	Report	D McCarthy 1-9 (1-6 f), K Fitzpatrick 1-1, K McCarthy 0-2, B Corry, L O’Callaghan, J Dwyer, S O’Mahony (f) 0-1 each.

== Group C ==
=== Table ===
Advance to knockout stage Advance to relegation play-off

Team	Matches				Score			Pts
Team	Pld	W	D	L	For	Against	Diff	Pts
Fr. O'Neill's	3	2	1	0	5-62	6-42	17	5
Newcestown	3	1	2	0	6-55	5-40	18	4
Killeagh	3	1	1	1	5-48	3-53	1	3
Cloyne	3	0	0	3	4-33	6-63	-36	0

=== Results ===
11 September 2021 Round 1	Cloyne	1-14 - 2-16	Killeagh	Castlemartyr
	B O'Shea 0-10 (0-9 f), P O'Sullivan 1-1, K Dennehy, B Walsh, M Cahill 0-1 each.	Report	E Keniry 0-9 (0-6 f), S Long 1-1, G Leahy 1-0, R McCarthy 0-3, A Walsh 0-2, S Smiddy 0-1.	Referee: P O'Driscoll (Bride Rovers)

12 September 2021 Round 1	Fr. O'Neill's	2-17 - 3-14	Newcestown	Páirc Uí Rinn
	D Dalton 0-9 (0-6 f), M O’Keeffe 1-2, J Millerick 1-0, K O’Sullivan, D Harrington 0-2 each, P McMahon, B Dunne 0-1 each.	Report	D Buckley 2-1, C Dinneen 0-5, J Meade 1-2, R O’Sullivan 0-3 (0-2f), S O’Donovan 0-2, E Kelly 0-1.	Referee: C O'Regan (Ballyhea)

19 September 2021 Round 2	Newcestown	2-24 - 1-09	Cloyne	Ballyanley Sportsfield
	R O’Sullivan (0-8 f) 0-10, L Meade 1-3, C Keane 1-1, C Dineen 0-3, C O’Donovan, S O’Donovan, J Meade 0-2 each, D Buckley 0-1.	Report	B O’Shea (1-0 pen, 0-1 f) 1-2, P O’Sullivan 0-3, D Cronin 0-2, K Dennehy, C Cahill 0-1 each.	Referee: C Lyons (Nemo Rangers)

19 September 2021 Round 2	Killeagh	1-18 - 1-22	Fr. O'Neill's	Youghal GAA Grounds
	E Keniry 1-11 (0-7f, 0-1 65), R McCarthy 0-3 (0-1 f), J Fogarty 0-2, S Smiddy, A Leahy 0-1 each.	Report	D Dalton 1-14 (0-10 f, 0-1 65, 0-1 sl), T Millerick, C Broderick 0-2 each, M O’Keeffe, John Millerick, P McMahon, K O’Sullivan 0-1 each.	Referee: C O'Regan (Ballyhea)

10 October 2021 Round 3	Fr. O'Neill's	2-23 - 2-10	Cloyne	Páirc Shéamuis de Barra
	D Dalton 2-7 (0-4 f), B Dunne 0-5, P McMahon K O’Sullivan 0-4 each, J Hankard, T Mellerick, John Millerick 0-1 each.	Report	B O’Shea 1-2, P O’Sullivan 0-5 f, B Minihane 1-0, M Cahill, C Mullins, K Dennehy 0-1 each.

10 October 2021 Round 3	Newcestown	1-17 - 2-14	Killeagh	Coachford Sportsfield
	R O’Sullivan 0-6 (0-5 f), J Meade 1-3 (0-1 f), T Twomey, C Dineen, L Meade, E Kenneally 0-2 each.	Report	E Keniry 0-8 (0-4 f, 0-1 65), G Leahy 1-2, R McCarthy 1-1, A Walsh, S Long, D Kelleher 0-1 each.

== Knockout stage ==
=== Relegation playoff ===
30 October 2021 Playoff	Bandon	0-14 - 3-15	Cloyne	Ballymah GAA Field
	A O’Mahony 0-7 (0-3 f), C Calnan 0-3, E McSweeney 0-2; R Desmond, D O’Donovan 0-1 each.	Report	M Cahill 3-0, B O’Shea 0-9 (0-8 f, 0-1 65), B Walsh, K Dennehy 0-2 each; C Mullins, C Cahill 0-1 each.

=== Quarter-finals ===
30 October 2021 Quarter-final	Newcestown	0-28 - 2-15	Mallow	Páirc Uí Chaoimh
	R O’Sullivan 0-9 (0-5 f, 0-1 65); D Buckley, S O’Donovan 0-4 each; J Meade, J Kelleher 0-3 each; M Kenneally 0-2 (0-1f); T Horgan, C O’Donovan, C Dineen 0-1 each.	Report	S Hayes 0-7 (0-4, 0-3 65); K Sheehan 1-1 (1-0 65) S O’Callaghan 1-0; R Sheehan 0-2, P Herlihy, T Doyle, D Sheehan, M Maher, D Hayes 0-1 each.

30 October 2021 Quarter-final	Blarney	2-16 - 2-21	Bride Rovers	Páirc Uí Chaoimh
	M Coleman 1-11 (0-8 f), S Crowley 1-0, S Barrett 0-2, M O’Leary, P Crowley, P Philpott 0-1 each.	Report	W Finnegan 0-11 (0-7 f, 0-2 65), B Roche 0-5, M Collins, P O’Flynn 1-1 each, C O’Connor, D Dooley, S O’Connor 0-1 each.

=== Semi-finals ===
6 November 2021 Semi-final	Kanturk	4-23 - 0-26 (aet)	Newcestown	Páirc Uí Chaoimh
	L O’Keeffe 2-1, B O’Sullivan 0-5 (0-3f), R Walsh 1-1, Aidan Walsh, C Clernon 0-3 each, Alan Walsh 1-0, I Walsh, D Browne, C Walsh 0-2 each, P Walsh, J Browne, L McLoughlin, A Sheehy 0-1 each.	Report	D Buckley 0-6, R O’Sullivan 0-5f, L Meade 0-3, S O’Donovan, T Horgan, C Dinneen, E Kenneally 0-2 each, F Keane, C O’Donovan, T Twomey, J Meade 0-1 each.	Referee: J Larkin (Ballinora)

13 November 2021 Semi-final	Fr. O'Neill's	1-19 - 1-15	Bride Rovers	Páirc Uí Chaoimh
	K O’Sullivan 0-13 (0-10 f, 0-2-65), J Hankard 1-1, P McMahon 0-2, C Broderick, B Dunne, Joe Millerick 0-1 each.	Report	W Finnegan 0-9 f, C O’Connor 1-1, M Collins 0-2, S O’Connor, K Kearney, D Dooley 0-1 each.	Referee: C O'Regan (Ballyhea)

=== Final ===
21 November 2021 Final	Kanturk	3-17 - 2-13	Fr. O'Neill's	Páirc Uí Chaoimh
	C Walsh 3-1, A Walsh 0-5, L O'Keeffe 0-4 (0-1 f), B O'Sullivan 0-3 (0-1 f, 0-1 65), I Walsh, L McLoughlin, D O'Connell, C Clernon 0-1 each.	Report	K O'Sullivan 0-7 (0-5 f, 0-1 65), C Broderick 1-1, R Cullinane 1-0, B Dunne 0-2, T Millerick, M O'Keeffe, D Harrington 0-1 each.	Referee: N Wall (Ballincollig)

== Championship statistics ==
=== Top scorers ===
Overall

Rank	Player	Club	Tally	Total	Matches	Average
1	Mark Coleman	Blarney	1-38	41	4	10.25
2	Declan Dalton	Fr. O'Neill's	3-30	39	3	13.00
3	Aidan O'Mahony	Bandon	0-34	34	4	8.50
3	Brian O'Sullivan	Kanturk	0-34	34	5	6.80
5	Richard O'Sullivan	Newcestown	0-33	33	5	6.60
6	Eoghan Keniry	Killeagh	1-28	31	3	10.33
7	Darren McCarthy	Ballymartle	3-20	29	3	9.66
7	Brian O'Shea	Cloyne	2-23	29	4	7.25
9	Kevin O'Sullivan	Fr. O'Neill's	0-27	27	5	5.40
10	William Finnegan	Bride Rovers	0-24	24	5	4.80

In a single game

Rank	Player	Club	Tally	Total	Opposition
1	Declan Dalton	Fr. O'Neill's	1-14	17	Killeagh
2	Pa O'Callaghan	Ballyhea	0-15	15	Ballymartle
3	Eoghan Keniry	Killeagh	1-11	14	Fr. O'Neill's
3	Mark Coleman	Blarney	1-11	14	Bride Rovers
5	Declan Dalton	Fr. O'Neill's	2-07	13	Cloyne
5	Kevin O'Sullivan	Fr. O'Neill's	0-13	13	Bride Rovers
7	Darren McCarthy	Ballymartle	1-09	12	Ballyhea
7	Gary Sweeney	Mallow	0-12	12	Ballymartle
9	Darren McCarthy	Ballymartle	2-05	11	Mallow
9	Aidan O'Mahony	Bandon	0-11	11	Fermoy
9	Conor Barry	Bride Rovers	0-11	11	Ballyhea
9	William Finnegan	Bride Rovers	0-11	11	Blarney
