= Kanturk GAA =

Gaelic sports club in County Cork, Ireland

- Ceanntuirc
- Founded: 1882
- County: Cork
- Colours: Green and White
- Grounds: Kanturk
- Coordinates: 52°10′54.76″N 8°53′57.37″W

Playing kits
Standard colours

Founded in 1882 Kanturk GAA is a dual Senior Gaelic Athletic Association club with Gaelic football and hurling teams, based in the town of Kanturk, County Cork, Ireland which forms part of the parish of Kanturk and Lismire. It is affiliated with Cork GAA and plays in Duhallow division competitions.

The club's hurling team currently competes in the Cork Premier Senior Hurling Championship having won the Cork Senior A Hurling Championship in 2021. In 2017, the club won the Cork Intermediate Championship, the Munster Intermediate Hurling Championship and the All Ireland Intermediate Hurling Championship. Kanturk hurlers also compete in Division 1 of the Cork Club Hurling League.

The club's Gaelic football team competes in the Cork Senior A Football Championship having won the Cork Premier Intermediate Football Championship in 2022.

== History ==
The club has been in existence since 1882, prior to the formation of the Gaelic Athletic Association. It was in football that Kanturk were a force is the early years when in 1897 the Cork Senior Football Championship final was reached before losing to famed Dohenys of Dunmanway by 5pts to 4pts after a replay. Both games were played in Cork Park in October 1897. Kanturk reached their second senior county football final in 1902. The game was played at Mallow on 16 November 1903 as the various county championships ran very late. Once again Kanturk had to contend with defeat when they lost by 0–10 to 1–1 to Lees. In 1909 the championships were re-organised to have Senior, Intermediate and Junior grades. Kanturk were senior that year but re-graded to Intermediate in 1910. This was to prove to be a master stroke as Kanturk won the Cork Intermediate Football Championship final of that year when they defeated C.Y.M.S. in the final played at Fermoy on 5 September by 3–4 to 0–1. Of the Kanturk team, P Carver (capt), R Moynihan, P Dennehy and D Singleton represented the club on the Cork Junior Football team. After the advent of the Duhallow GAA Board in 1933, Kanturk's first win was in the Examiner Cup, Junior football league in 1942. The Duhallow Junior A Hurling Championship was won two years later with a return to divisional hurling championship honours in 1949 and saw the club progress to a first ever Cork Junior Hurling Championship final in October only to lose to Bandon by 7–3 t0 1–2. At the Cork Athletic Grounds. Novice football victory in 1952 was followed by Examiner Cup, Junior Football league victory in 1953, before the club's first Duhallow Junior A Football Championship was won in 1954 with victory over Dromtarriffe at Banteer. 1957 was a special year with Kanturk winning the Junior football League and Championship double along with Junior Hurling league and Minor football championships, the only cup missing being the Minor & Junior hurling championship. Kanturk's third Duhallow Junior football championship came in 1962 when both the Novice and Junior Championships were won at Millstreet. The Junior decider was a replay and Knocknagree were defeated by 3–5 to 1–6. As the footballers played in the Intermediate grade from 1965 to 1970 inclusive, it was the hurling team that stepped up to the mark, winning a record 5 Duhallow Junior A Hurling Championships in a row from 1965 to 1969 culminating in Cork Junior Hurling Championship honours with victory over Mayfield at Castletownroche on a 3–7 to 1–10 score line. The link between both county junior hurling final appearances was that 1969 winning captain, Denis Kenneally is Brother of 1949 team captain, Tom Kenneally. Examiner Cup, Junior football league success in 1973 along with Novice football championship success the same year brought a hope for championship breakthrough. Sadly championship final defeats were their lot in 1986 to Ballydesmond, 1987(Rockchapel), 1993(Newmarket), 1997 & 2000 (Kiskeam). Success at Juvenile, Minor and U21 grades continued over the years to help provide a supply line of talent in both codes. Defeat was also tasted in the Junior Hurling finals of 1977 to Meelin and 1987 to Lismire. Junior hurling league wins in 1987 and 1988 gave hope but the long wait for a championship breakthrough came in 2002 when out of the ashes of a poor league campaign, the 33-year famine was ended with a victory in the glorious sunshine at Banteer with victory over Meelin. Despite County championship defeat to Diarmuid O Mathuna's, Kanturk recovered to gain back to back Duhallow Junior Hurling championship victories in 2003 with a replay win over Freemount at Kilbrin. A narrow county semi-final defeat to Dromina at Buttevant followed before an invitation to up grade to Intermediate level was taken in 2004. Steady progress has been made since then with Championship semi-final being reached in 2007 and 2008 losing to Bandon and Carrigaline respectively. In 2009 Kanturk won the Duhallow Junior A Football Championship for the first time in 47 years, defeating Rockchapel in the final in Boherbue. Kanturk were knocked in the county Championship by Ballygarvan after a replay. In 2010, Kanturk again got to the Duhallow final before losing out to Lyre. A third Duhallow final appearance in a row in 2011 saw Kanturk renew rivalry with Rockchapel at Rathcoole. It was a rematch of the 2009 decider and the 1987 decider which was the last occasion Dromtarriffe hosted the Duhallow showpiece. Rockchapel won on that occasion (1987) by one point and went on to win county honours. In the 2011 Duhallow Final, a goal from Aidan Walsh midway through the 2nd half set Kanturk on their way to a 1–11 to 1–06 victory. Subsequently, the club went on to win the Cork Junior Football Championship.

== Honours ==
- All-Ireland Intermediate Club Hurling Championship: 2018
- Munster Intermediate Club Hurling Championship Winners (1) 2017
- Cork Senior A Hurling Championship Winners (1) 2021
- Cork Senior Football Championship Runners-up 1896, 1897
- Cork Premier Intermediate Hurling Championship Winners (1) 2017
- Cork Intermediate Football Championship Winners (2) 1910, 2017
- Cork Premier Intermediate Football Championship: Winners (1) 2022 | Runners-Up 2020, 2021
- Cork Intermediate Hurling Championship Winners (1) 2013 Runners-up 2012
- Cork Junior Hurling Championship Winners (1) 1969 | Runners-up 1949
- Cork Junior Football Championship Winners (1) 2011
- Cork Minor Hurling Championship Runners-up 1957, 1958
- Cork Minor Football Championship Runners-up 1958
- Cork Minor A Football Championship Winner (1) 2011 | Runners-up 1992
- Duhallow Junior A Hurling Championship Winners (9) 1937, 1949, 1965, 1966, 1967, 1968, 1969, 2002, 2003 | Runners-up 1950, 1954, 1958, 1959, 1961, 1977, 1987
- Duhallow Junior A Football Championship Winners (5) 1954, 1967, 1962, 2009, 2011 | Runners-up 1943, 1950, 1961, 1986, 1987, 1993, 1997, 2000, 2022

== Notable players ==
- Lorcán McLoughlin
- Anthony Nash- GAA/GPA All-Stars Hurling winner 2012 and 2013
- Brian O'Sullivan
- Mick O'Loughlin
- John O'Mahony
- Aidan Walsh- 2010 All-Ireland Senior Football Championship winner. 2010 All-Stars Young Footballer of the Year and All-Stars Football 2010 and 2012
- Ryan Walsh
- Paul Walsh
- Colin Walsh
- Darren Browne- Club Senior Hurling winner captain
