= Kanturk =

Town in County Cork, Ireland

Kanturk Irish: Ceann Toirc
- Town
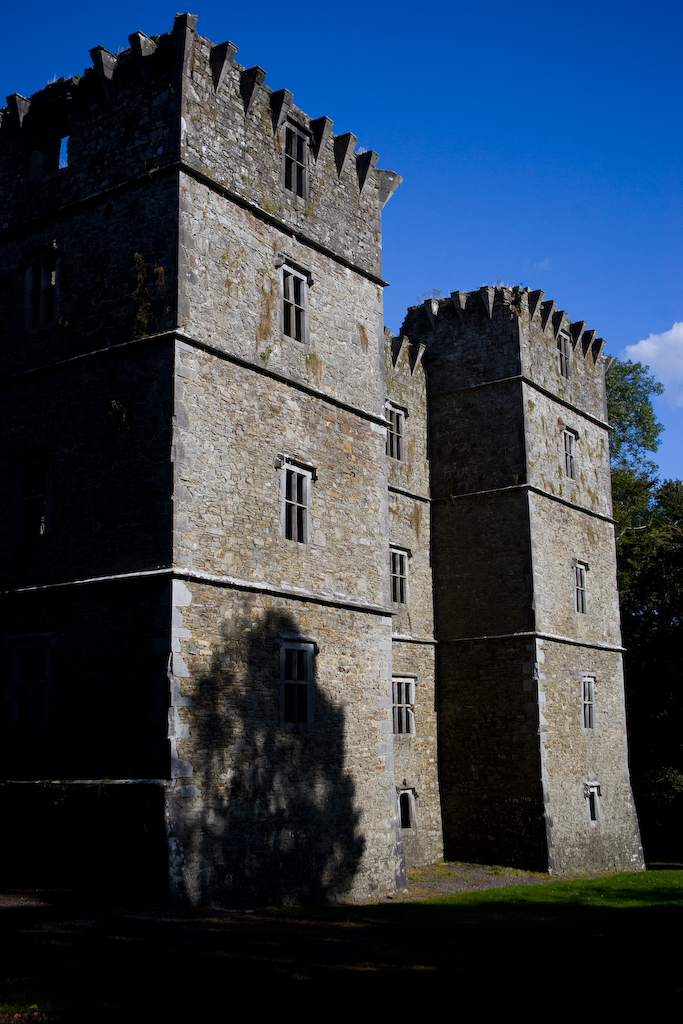
- Kanturk Castle

- Location in Ireland
- Coordinates: 52°10′30″N 8°54′0″W
- Country: Ireland
- Province: Munster
- County: County Cork

Population (2022)
  - Total: 2,803
- Time zone: UTC+0 (WET)
  - Summer (DST): UTC-1 (IST (WEST))

Kanturk (Irish: Ceann Toirc, meaning 'boar's head') is a town in the north west of County Cork, Ireland. It is situated at the confluence of the Allua (Allow) and Dallow (Dalua) rivers, which stream further on as tributaries to the River Blackwater. It is about 50 kilometres (31 miles) from Cork and Limerick, and lies just north of the main N72 road, 15 km (9 miles) from Mallow and about 40 km (25 miles) from Killarney. Kanturk is within the Cork North-West Dáil constituency.

== History ==
Located at a crossing point at the confluence of the River Allow and River Dalua, evidence of ancient settlement near Kanturk includes a number of ringfort, holy well and fulacht fiadh sites in the surrounding townlands of Coolacoosane, Curragh, Greenane and Gurteenard. The town's English name, Kanturk, derives from the Irish Ceann Toirc or Ceann Tuirc, meaning head (or headland) of the boar.

To the south of the town, in Paal East townland, is Kanturk Castle. Known locally as the Old Court, this fortified house was built c. 1601 for MacDonogh McCarthy as a defence against English settlers during the Plantation of Ireland. The building was a limestone rubble Tudor mansion four storeys high, 28 metres in length and 11 metres wide, with four towers of five storeys high and a height of 29 metres. The castle was never fully completed. Work stopped c. 1618, reputedly because local English settlers were concerned that the structure was too large and fortified, and could be used as a base to attack them. Accordingly, the Privy Council in England ordered that building works be stopped. After changing hands several times in the intervening centuries, Kanturk Castle is now owned by An Taisce (the National Trust for Ireland), and is a designated National Monument.

As of 2015, there were 32 buildings or structures listed on the Record of Protected Structures for County Cork. These include a number of the town's bridges, which date to the late 18th and early 19th centuries. The larger religious and administrative buildings in Kanturk date to the early to mid-19th century, including the former market house (1810), court house (1825), Church of Ireland church (1858), and Roman Catholic church (1867).

== Economy and amenities ==
The local creamery, North Cork Creameries, was founded in 1928 and produces casein powder and other milk products.

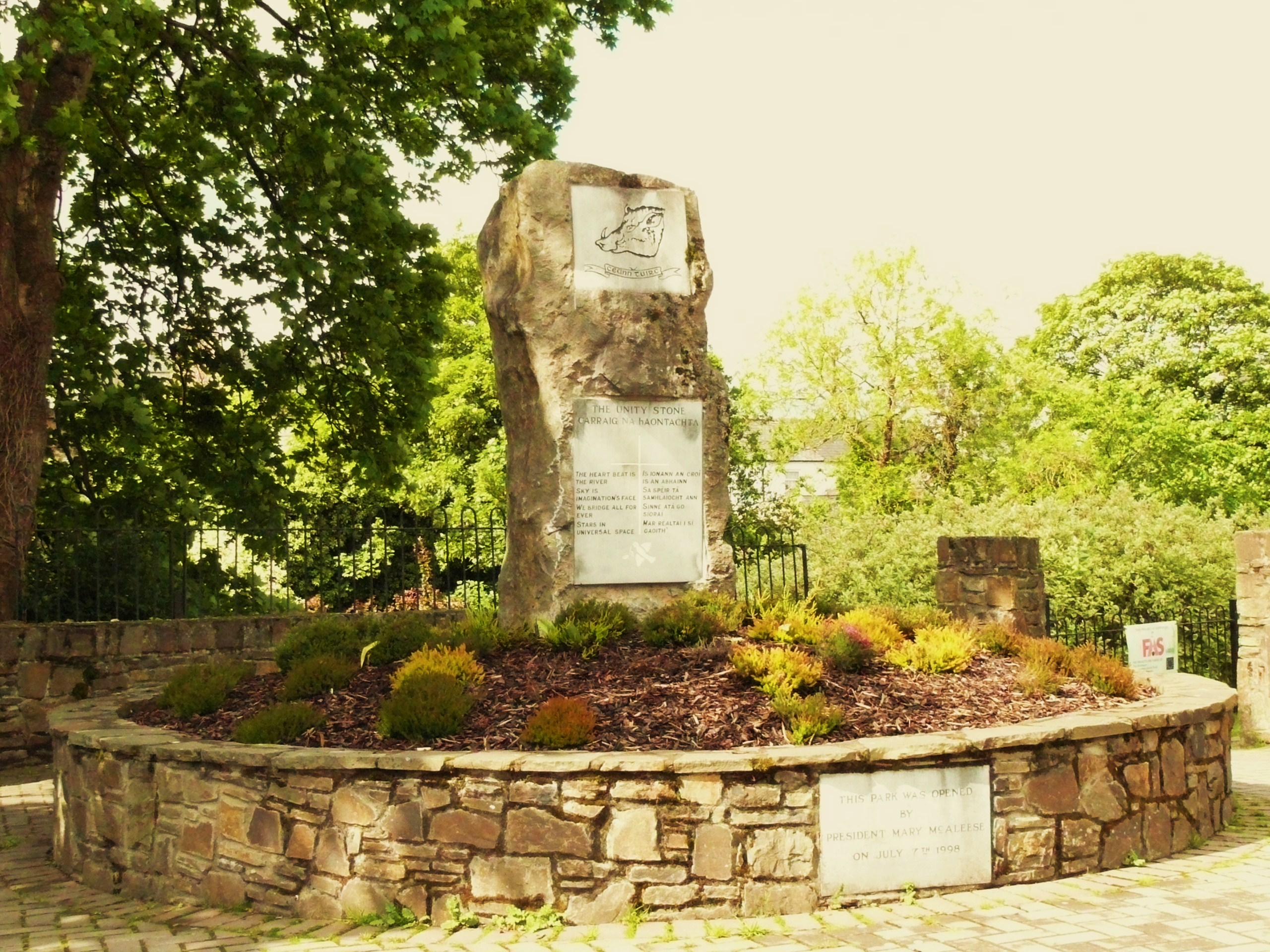
The "Unity Stone", in Kanturk Unity Park has an inscription and a notice indicating that the park was opened by then President Mary McAleese on 7 July 1998

Kanturk's library offers lending facilities, newspapers, reference books, internet access and also organises cultural events.

Kanturk Town Park is a short distance from the town shopping centre. The "Unity Stone" monument is located near the park's entrance. The park has oak, beech, chestnut and ash trees, a children's playground, some cultural exhibits, and a walkway by the banks of the Dalua.

The town's schools include a number of national (primary) schools and two co-educational secondary schools. The secondary schools, Coláiste Treasa and Scoil Mhuire, have enrollments of over 500 and 270 students respectively.

== Sport ==
Kanturk GAA club has a hurling team and a football team, both men's and women's from underage to Intermediate level. The local pitch is located in Kilroe, just outside the town. Kanturk RFC is a rugby union club which is also located just outside the town, at Knocknacolan. Founded in 1927, the club played in the All-Ireland League for five years and now plays in the Munster Junior League. An eighteen-hole golf course is located on Mill Road, where milling used to take place. The local association football soccer pitch has facilities to accommodate a number of teams. Kanturk also has a cycling club with its own outdoor 250m velodrome, one of only three on the island of Ireland.

Kanturk has a trout fishing club which maintains the rivers that flow through the town. From Newmarket, the Dalua river flows into the Allow (Freemount River) in the centre of the town. A further 2 km (1 mile) south of the town the river Brogeen flows into the Allow. The Allow joins the River Blackwater; known for its salmon fishing, a further 3 km (2 mi) downstream at Leaders Bridge on the N72 Mallow to Killarney road. The Kanturk Trout Anglers Association has been represented on the international stage on several occasions, with past members participating at the World Fly Fishing Championships.

== Transport ==
Historical population
Year	Pop.	±%
1831	1,349	—
1841	4,388	+225.3%
1851	3,131	−28.6%
1861	2,285	−27.0%
1871	1,964	−14.0%
1881	1,859	−5.3%
1891	1,689	−9.1%
1901	1,583	−6.3%
1911	1,518	−4.1%
1926	1,630	+7.4%
1936	1,555	−4.6%
1946	1,577	+1.4%
1951	1,632	+3.5%
1956	2,005	+22.9%
1961	1,985	−1.0%
1966	1,938	−2.4%
1971	2,063	+6.4%
1981	1,976	−4.2%
1986	1,870	−5.4%
1991	1,777	−5.0%
1996	1,666	−6.2%
2002	1,651	−0.9%
2006	1,915	+16.0%
2011	2,263	+18.2%
2016	2,350	+3.8%
2022	2,803	+19.3%

By rail, Kanturk is served by the nearby Banteer railway station, which is 6 km (4 mi) from Kanturk. The town's one-time railway station opened on 1 April 1889, closed for passenger traffic on 27 January 1947 and finally closed altogether on 4 February 1963.

Kanturk is served by Bus Éireann route 243 which runs from Newmarket to Cork via Kanturk and Mallow.

Kanturk is 51 km (32 mi) from Kerry Airport and a little over 60 km (37 mi) from Cork Airport.

== People ==
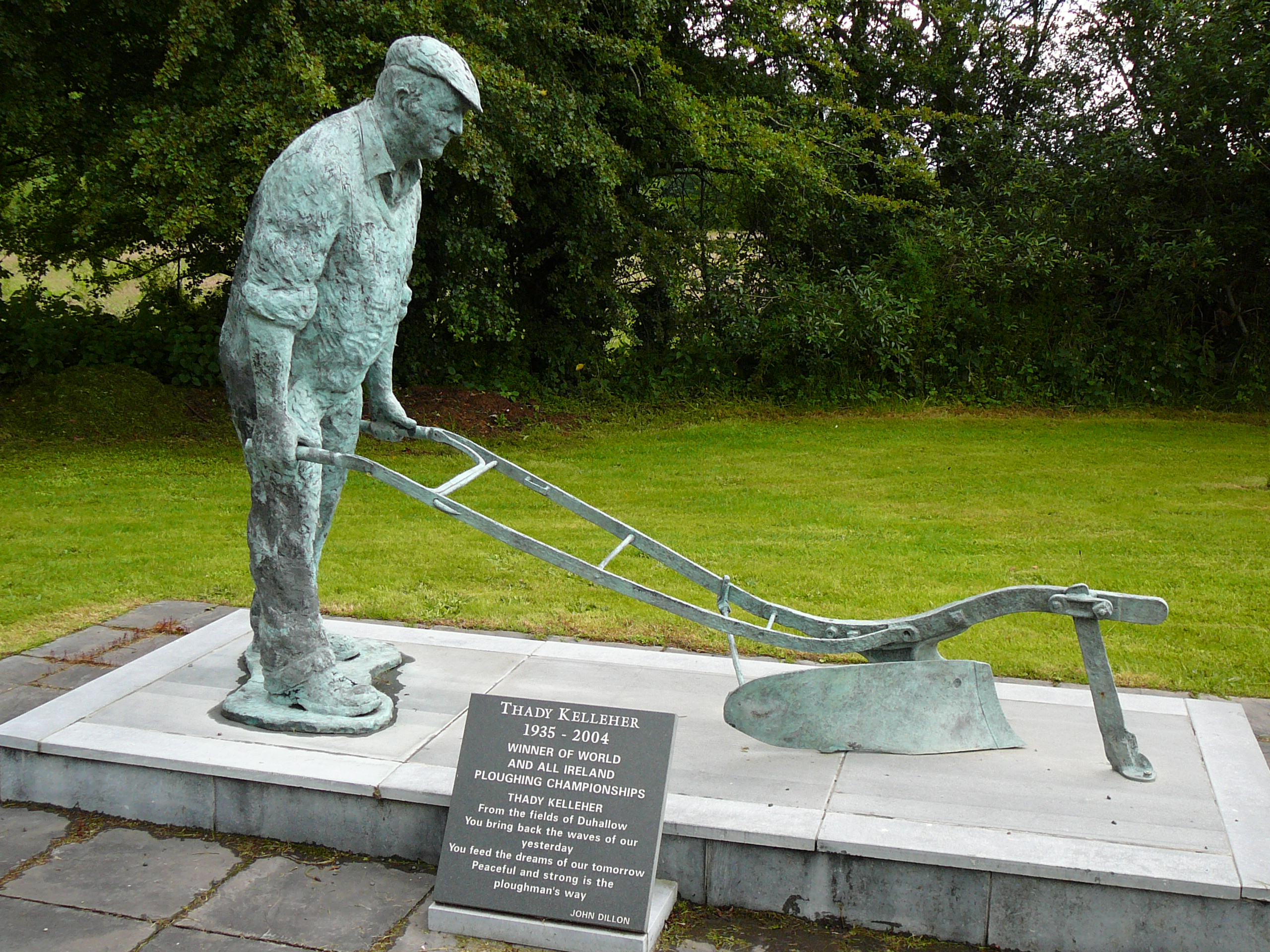
Thady Kelleher, International Champion Ploughman from Duhallow, displayed on the approach roadside to Kanturk

People of note from the area include:

- Jackie Daly (born 1945), Irish musician
- Patrick Guiney (1862–1913), agrarian agitator and nationalist MP from 1910 to 1913
- Philip Francis Johnson (1835–1926), politician, labour activist and local hotel proprietor
- Sean P. Keating (1903–1976), IRA member who became Deputy Mayor of New York City
- Pat O'Callaghan, (1905–1991), twice Olympic gold medal winner and medical doctor
- Michael O'Leary (born 1961), CEO of Ryanair
- Pádraig A. Ó Síocháin (1905–1995), author and Irish language activist
- Thady Quill (1860–1932), historical rake
- Edel Quinn (1907–1944), missionary worker declared Venerable in 1994
- D. D. Sheehan (1874–1948), labour activist and parliamentarian MP from 1901 to 1918
- Hanna Sheehy-Skeffington (1877–1946), suffragette and author

== See also ==
- List of towns and villages in Ireland
- Market Houses in Ireland
