= Michael O'Halloran (Cork hurler) =

Irish hurler (born 1997)

Personal information
- Native name: Mícheál Ó hAllúráin (Irish)
- Born: 1997 (age 28–29) Blackrock, Cork, Ireland
- Occupation: Student
- Height: 6 ft 1 in (185 cm)

Sport
- Sport: Hurling
- Position: Left corner-forward
Club*
| Years | Club | Apps (scores) |
| 2015-present | Blackrock | 21 (6-65) |
Club titles
- Cork titles: 1
College
- Years: College
- University College Cork
College titles
- Fitzgibbon titles: 2
Inter-county**
| Years | County | Apps (scores) |
| 2016-present | Cork | 2 (0-00) |
Inter-county titles
- Munster titles: 0
- All-Irelands: 0
- NHL: 0
- All Stars: 0
- * club appearances and scores correct as of 14:16, 2 December 2018. **Inter County team apps and scores correct as of 13:41, 2 December 2018.

Michael O'Halloran (born 1997) is an Irish hurler who plays as a left corner-forward for club side Blackrock and at inter-county level with the Cork senior hurling team.

== Playing career ==
=== University College Cork ===
On 23 February 2019, O'Halloran lined out as a substitute for University College Cork when they faced Mary Immaculate College in the Fitzgibbon Cup final. He remained on the bench for the entire game but collected a winners' medal following the 2–21 to 0–13 victory.

O'Halloran was again named amongst the substitutes for a second successive Fitzgibbon Cup final on 12 February 2020. He was introduced as a 36th-minute substitute for Mark Kehoe and claimed a second successive winners' medal in the 0–18 to 2–11 defeat of the Institute of Technology, Carlow.

=== Blackrock ===
==== Minor and under-21 ====
O'Halloran joined the Blackrock club at a young age and played in all grades at juvenile and underage levels. On 1 October 2012, he was a non-playing substitute when Blackrock defeated Mallow by 4–18 to 0–15 to win the Premier 1 MHC title.

After being called up to the club's under-21 team, O'Halloran was again a non-playing substitute when Blackrock defeated Carrigaline by 5–13 to 4–10 to win the Cork Premier Under-21 Championship title on 18 October 2014.

On 13 November 2015, O'Halloran was at right corner-forward when Blackrock qualified for a second successive Cork Premier Under-21 Championship final. He scored six points in the 1–21 to 0–08 defeat of divisional side Duhallow to retain the title.

==== Senior ====
On 21 June 2015, O'Halloran made his first appearance for the Blackrock senior team. He was introduced as a 49th-minute substitute for Ger Regan at right wing-forward in a 2–11 to 0–15 defeat of St. Finbarr's.

On 22 October 2017, O'Halloran lined out at right corner-forward when Blackrock faced Imokilly in the Cork Championship final. He top scored for Blackrock with eight points, including six from frees, in the 3–13 to 0–18 defeat.

=== Cork ===
==== Minor and under-21 ====
O'Halloran was selected for the Cork minor team for the first time during the 2014 Munster Championship. He was an unused substitute throughout the championship which ended with 0–23 to 2–15 defeat by Limerick at the semi-final stage.

On 8 April 2015, O'Halloran made his first appearance for the Cork minor team. He scored two points from left corner-forward in Cork's 2–20 to 1–13 defeat by Limerick. On 2 July, O'Halloran played his last game in the minor grade when he lined out at centre-forward in a 1–14 to 0–14 defeat by Limerick.

O'Halloran joined the Cork under-21 team for the 2016 Munster Championship. He made his first appearance for the team on 28 June when he came on as a 45th-minute substitute for Tim O'Mahony at full-forward in a 3–19 to 2–15 defeat by Limerick.

On 26 July 2017, O'Halloran lined out in his first Munster final as a member of the starting fifteen. He scored two points from right wing-forward in the 0–16 to 1–11 defeat by Limerick.

O'Halloran was again eligible for the under-21 grade in 2018. After lining out at left wing-forward in Cork's 0–23 to 1-17 semi-final defeat of Waterford, he was dropped from the starting fifteen for the final on 4 July. O'Halloran was introduced as a 57th-minute substitute for Liam Healy and collected a Munster Championship medal following the 2–23 to 1–13 defeat of Tipperary. On 26 August, he was a non-playing substitute when Cork suffered a 3–13 to 1–16 defeat by Tipperary in the All-Ireland final.

==== Senior ====
O'Halloran was added to the Cork senior team prior to the start of the 2016 Munster Championship. He was an unused substitute throughout the championship before being released from the panel at the end of the year.

In November 2018, O'Halloran was recalled to the Cork senior panel. He made his first appearance for the team on 27 January 2019 when he was introduced as a 62nd-minute substitute for Luke Meade in a 2–18 to 0–17 defeat by Kilkenny in the National League.

== Career statistics ==
=== Club ===
As of match played 15 August 2025.

| Team | Year | Cork PSHC | |
| Team | Year | Apps | Score |
|---|---|---|---|
| Blackrock | 2015 | 2 | 0-03 |
| Blackrock | 2016 | 3 | 2-04 |
| Blackrock | 2017 | 5 | 1-23 |
| Blackrock | 2018 | 3 | 2-19 |
| Blackrock | 2019 | 2 | 0-07 |
| Blackrock | 2020 | 6 | 1-09 |
| Blackrock | 2021 | 5 | 1-09 |
| Blackrock | 2022 | 6 | 1-15 |
| Blackrock | 2023 | 4 | 0-07 |
| Blackrock | 2024 | 0 | 0-00 |
| Blackrock | 2025 | 2 | 3-03 |
| Career total | | 38 | 11-99 |

=== Inter-county ===
As of match played 1 March 2020.

| Team | Year | National League | | | Munster | | All-Ireland | | Total | |
| Team | Year | Division | Apps | Score | Apps | Score | Apps | Score | Apps | Score |
|---|---|---|---|---|---|---|---|---|---|---|
| Cork | 2016 | Division 1A | — | | 0 | 0-00 | 0 | 0-00 | 0 | 0-00 |
| Cork | 2017 | Division 1A | — | | — | | — | | — | |
| Cork | 2018 | Division 1A | — | | — | | — | | — | |
| Cork | 2019 | Division 1A | 2 | 0-00 | 0 | 0-00 | 0 | 0-00 | 2 | 0-00 |
| Cork | 2020 | Division 1A | 0 | 0-00 | 0 | 0-00 | 0 | 0-00 | 0 | 0-00 |
| Career total | | | 2 | 0-00 | 0 | 0-00 | 0 | 0-00 | 2 | 0-00 |

== Honours ==
University College Cork

- Fitzgibbon Cup (2): 2019, 2020

Blackrock

- Cork Premier Senior Hurling Championship (1): 2020 (jc)
- Cork Premier Under-21 A Hurling Championship (2): 2014, 2015
- Cork Premier 1 Minor Hurling Championship (1): 2013

Cork

- Munster Under-21 Hurling Championship (1): 2018
