= List of Cork Premier Senior Football Championship runners-up =

This is a list of all teams and players who have been runners-up in the Cork Premier Senior Football Championship, and its preceding competition, since its inception in 1887.

== By team ==
#	Team	Losses	Losing Years
1	Clonakilty	14	1932, 1933, 1934, 1935, 1936, 1938, 1945, 1954, 1961, 1968, 1983, 1985, 2003, 2021
2	Fermoy	12	1901, 1904, 1908, 1912, 1913, 1915, 1916, 1918, 1942, 1943, 1944, 1946
3	St. Finbarr's	11	1965, 1966, 1984, 1986, 1989, 1990, 1991, 1993, 2009, 2010, 2017
4	Macroom	8	1889, 1907, 1925, 1927, 1929, 1949, 1955, 1959
4	UCC	8	1924, 1926, 1953, 1967, 1971, 1972, 1980, 1996
4	Duhallow	8	1928, 1937, 1982, 1988, 1998, 2012, 2018, 2019
7	St. Nicholas'	5	1947, 1950, 1951, 1963, 1969
7	Carbery	5	1931, 1964, 1973, 1974, 2000
7	Castlehaven	5	1979, 1997, 2011, 2015, 2020
10	Nils	4	1891, 1895, 1899, 1911
10	Dohenys	4	1898, 1903, 1975, 2006
10	Nemo Rangers	4	1970, 1992, 1999, 2013
13	Kanturk	3	1896, 1897, 1902
13	Youghal	3	1914, 1919, 1923
13	Millstreet	3	1940, 1941, 1956
13	St. Michael's	3	1976, 1977, 1978
13	Bantry Blues	3	1909, 1981, 2001
13	Muskerry	3	1962, 1995, 2005
13	Carbery Rangers	3	1905, 1906, 2014
20	Dromtarriffe	2	1888, 1890
20	Cobh	2	1910, 1920
20	Lees	2	1917, 1957
20	Avondhu	2	1958, 1960
20	Bishopstown	2	2002, 2004
25	Lisgoold	1	1887
25	Kilmurry	1	1892
25	Castlemartyr	1	1893
25	Kinsale Black & Whites	1	1894
25	Kinsale	1	1900
25	Na Deasúnaigh	1	1930
25	Beara	1	1939
25	St. Vincent's	1	1948
25	Collins	1	1952
25	Imokilly	1	1987
25	O'Donovan Rossa	1	1994
25	Ilen Rovers	1	2007
25	Ballincollig	1	2016

== By year ==
List of Cork Premier Senior Football Championship runners-up
Year	Team	Players	Ref
2021	Clonakilty	M White; M Shanley, T Clancy, D Peet; D Lowney, E Deasy, S White; B Ridgeway, J Grimes; G Barry, D Ó Sé, S McEvoy; R Mannix, J O'Mahony, O Bancroft. Sub: C Daly.	
