= Robert Downey (hurler) =

Irish hurler (born 1999)

Personal information
- Native name: Riobeard Ó Dúnaigh (Irish)
- Nickname: Rob
- Born: 21 September 1999 (age 27) Ballyvolane, Cork, Ireland
- Occupation: Administration assistant
- Height: 6 ft 7 in (201 cm)

Sport
- Sport: Hurling
- Position: Centre-back
Club*
Years	Club	Apps (scores)
2016-present	Glen Rovers	38 (2-09)
Club titles
- Cork titles: 1
College
- Years: College
- 2018-2021: University College Cork
College titles
- Fitzgibbon titles: 1
Inter-county**
Years	County	Apps (scores)
2018-present	Cork	39 (2-09)
Inter-county titles
- Munster titles: 1
- All-Irelands: 0
- NHL: 1
- All Stars: 1
- * club appearances and scores correct as of 17:47, 25 September 2025. **Inter County team apps and scores correct as of 22:41, 21 June 2026.

Robert Downey (born 21 September 1999) is an Irish hurler. At club level, he plays with Glen Rovers and at inter-county level with the Cork senior hurling team. He usually lines out as a centre-back.

== Early life ==
Born and raised in Cork, Downey first played hurling to a high standard as a student at Christian Brothers College, Cork. He progressed through the various age grades before beginning a three-year tenure with the school's senior team in 2015. Downey later studied at University College Cork and was added to their Fitzgibbon Cup panel in 2020, having earlier lined out with the freshers' team. He won a Fitzgibbon Cup winners' medal that year after lining out at full-back in UCC's 0–18 to 2–11 defeat of the Institute of Technology, Carlow in the final.

== Club career ==
Downey began his club career at juvenile and underage levels with the Glen Rovers club on the northside of Cork city. He had success in the minor grade in 2017 when the Glen won the Cork Premier 1 MHC title after beating Midleton in the final.

Downey was still eligible for the minor grade when he joined the Glen's senior team. He was an unused substitute when Glen Rovers won the Cork SHC title after beating Erin's Own by 0–19 to 2–10 in the 2016 final. Downey subsequently became a regular member of the team and moved between the half-back line and full-back line for the Glen's defeats by Imokilly, Blackrock and Midleton in the respective 2019, 2020 and 2021 finals.

== Inter-county career ==
Downey first appeared on the inter-county scene with Cork as a member of the minor team in 2017. He won a Munster MHC that year after scoring 1–02 in Cork's 4–21 to 0–16 defeat of Clare in the final. He later lined out at full-forward for Cork's 2017 All-Ireland minor final defeat by Galway. Downey made his first appearance for Cork's inaugural under-20 team two years later. He ended the season without success, as Cork were beaten by Tipperary in the Munster and All-Ireland finals.

Downey made his first appearance for the senior team in a pre-season Munster SHL game against Clare in December 2018. Debuts in the National Hurling League and Munster SHC followed later that season. Downey was at full-back when Cork suffered a 3–32 to 1–22 defeat by Limerick in the 2021 All-Ireland final. He was at left wing-back when Cork lost the 2022 National League final to Waterford.

Downey was selected at centre-back when Cork faced Clare in the 2024 All-Ireland final. He scored an individual solo-run goal, described as one of the greatest ever scored in Croke Park, but ended on the losing side after a 3–29 to 1–34 extra-time win for Clare. He and his brother Eoin Downey were both presented with All-Star awards at the end of the 2024 season.

Downey was appointed team captain in November 2024. He captained Cork to the National League title in April 2025 following a 3–24 to 0–23 win over Tipperary in the final. Downey's season after this was impacted by a series of injuries, however, he returned to captain Cork to the Munster SHC title following Cork's penalty shootout defeat of Limerick in the 2025 Munster final.

== Personal life ==
Downey's younger brother Eoin is also a hurler.

== Career statistics ==
=== Club ===
As of 19 September 2025.

Team	Year	Cork PSHC		Munster		Total	
Team	Year	Apps	Score	Apps	Score	Apps	Score
Glen Rovers	2016	0	0-00	—		0	0-00
Glen Rovers	2017	2	0-00	—		2	0-00
Glen Rovers	2018	2	0-01	—		2	0-01
Glen Rovers	2019	5	0-01	1	0-00	6	0-00
Glen Rovers	2020	5	1-02	—		5	1-02
Glen Rovers	2021	6	0-00	—		6	0-00
Glen Rovers	2022	4	0-00	—		4	0-00
Glen Rovers	2023	4	0-01	—		4	0-01
Glen Rovers	Total	28	1-05	1	0-00	29	1-05
Glen Rovers	Year	Cork SAHC		Munster		Total	
Glen Rovers	Year	Apps	Score	Apps	Score	Apps	Score
Glen Rovers	2024	5	1-02	—		5	1-02
Glen Rovers	Total	5	1-02	—		5	1-02
Glen Rovers	Year	Cork PSHC		Munster		Total	
Glen Rovers	Year	Apps	Score	Apps	Score	Apps	Score
Glen Rovers	2025	4	0-02	—		4	0-02
Glen Rovers	Total	4	0-02	—		4	0-02
Career total		37	2-09	1	0-00	38	2-09

=== Inter-county ===
As of 21 June 2025.

Team	Year	National League			Munster		All-Ireland		Total	
Team	Year	Division	Apps	Score	Apps	Score	Apps	Score	Apps	Score
Cork	2019	Division 1A	2	0-00	3	0-00	0	0-00	5	0-00
Cork	2020	Division 1A	4	0-00	1	0-00	2	0-00	7	0-00
Cork	2021	Division 1A	4	0-01	0	0-00	4	0-00	8	0-01
Cork	2022	Division 1A	5	0-03	4	0-00	2	0-00	11	0-03
Cork	2023	Division 1A	3	0-01	4	0-03	—		7	0-04
Cork	2024	Division 1A	4	0-05	4	1-02	4	1-01	12	2-08
Cork	2025	Division 1A	5	0-00	4	0-01	2	0-00	11	0-01
Cork	2026	Division 1A	5	0-01	4	0-01	1	0-01	10	0-03
Career total			32	0-11	24	1-07	15	1-02	71	2-20

== Honours ==
University College Cork

- Fitzgibbon Cup: 2020

Glen Rovers

- Cork Senior Hurling Championship: 2016
- Cork Senior A Hurling Championship: 2024
- Cork Premier 1 Minor Hurling Championship: 2017

Cork

- Munster Senior Hurling Championship: 2025 (c)
- National Hurling League: 2025 (c)
- Munster Minor Hurling Championship: 2017

Awards

- The Sunday Game Team of the Year: 2024
- All Star: 2024

Sporting positions
Preceded by Seán O'Donoghue	Cork senior hurling team captain 2025	Succeeded by Darragh Fitzgibbon
