= Niall O'Leary =

Irish hurler (born 1998)

Personal information
- Native name: Niall Ó Laoire (Irish)
- Born: 1998 (age 27–28) Castlelyons, County Cork, Ireland
- Occupation: Secondary school teacher
- Height: 5 ft 11 in (180 cm)

Sport
- Sport: Hurling
- Position: Left corner-back
Clubs
- Years: Club
- 2015-present 2017-2018; 2020 2019; 2021-2023: Castlelyons → Imokilly → University College Cork
Club titles
- Cork titles: 2
College
- Years: College
- 2017-2023: University College Cork
College titles
- Fitzgibbon titles: 2
Inter-county*
Years	County	Apps (scores)
2019-present	Cork	41 (0-04)
Inter-county titles
- Munster titles: 1
- All-Irelands: 0
- NHL: 1
- All Stars: 1
- *Inter County team apps and scores correct as of 21:52, 22 June 2026.

Niall O'Leary (born 1998) is an Irish hurler who plays for club side Castlelyons, divisional side Imokilly and at inter-county level with the Cork senior hurling team. He is usually deployed as a corner-back, but can also be deployed as a full-back or as a centre-back.

== Playing career ==
=== St. Colman's College ===
O'Leary first came to prominence as a hurler with St. Colman's College in Fermoy. On 18 February 2017, he scored 1-01 from play for St. Colman's in a 2–22 to 1–06 defeat by Our Lady's Secondary School from Templemore in the Harty Cup final.

=== University College Cork ===
On 23 February 2019, O'Leary lined out at right corner-back for University College Cork when they faced Mary Immaculate College in the Fitzgibbon Cup final. He scored a point from play in the 2–21 to 0–13 victory.

O'Leary played in a second successive Fitzgibbon Cup final on 12 February 2020. Selected at left wing-back but mostly playing in a sweeper role, he ended the game with a second successive winners' medal after the 0–18 to 2–11 defeat of the Institute of Technology, Carlow.

=== Castlelyons ===
O'Leary joined the Castlelyons club at a young age and played in all grades at juvenile and underage levels. On 8 October 2016, he scored 1-1 from midfield in a 2–13 to 1-15 Cork Minor Championship final replay defeat by Ballygiblin.

=== Imokilly ===
In 2017, O'Leary was added to the Imokilly senior team. On 22 October, he was at centre-back when Imokilly defeated Blackrock by 3–13 to 0–18 to win the Cork Senior Championship.

On 14 October 2018, O'Leary won a second successive Cork Senior Championship medal from centre-back, following Imokilly's 4–19 to 1–18 defeat of Midleton in the final.

=== Cork ===
==== Minor and under-21 ====
O'Leary first played for Cork at minor level on 8 April 2015 in a 2–20 to 1-13 Munster Championship defeat of Limerick. An anomaly in the championship format saw Cork face the same opposition in the semi-final, with Limerick reversing the result. O'Leary was eligible for the minor grade again in 2016 and was appointed captain of the team. He played his last game in the minor grade on 30 June 2016 in a 0–23 to 1–12 defeat by Tipperary in the Munster semi-final.

On 20 June 2018, O'Leary made his first appearance for the Cork under-21 hurling team in a 0–23 to 1–17 defeat of Waterford. He later won a Munster Championship medal on 4 July following Cork's 2–23 to 1–13 defeat of Tipperary in the final. On 26 August, O'Leray was at left corner-back in Cork's 3–13 to 1-16 All-Ireland final defeat by Tipperary, in what was his last game in the grade.

==== Senior ====
On 2 January 2019, O'Leary made his first appearance for the Cork senior hurling team in a 1–24 to 1-18 pre-season Munster League defeat by Waterford. He was later included on the Cork panel for the National League but made no appearances throughout the six-game campaign. O'Leary made his first competitive appearance on 12 May when he lined out at left corner-back in a 2–28 to 1–24 defeat by Tipperary in the Munster Championship.

== Career statistics ==
=== Club ===
As of match played 20 April 2019.

Team	Year	Cork PIHC	
Team	Year	Apps	Score
Castlelyons	2015	2	0-01
Castlelyons	2016	1	0-00
Castlelyons	2017	3	0-03
Castlelyons	2018	3	0-00
Castlelyons	2019	1	0-02
Career total		10	0-06

=== Inter-county ===
As of 21 June 2026

Team	Year	National League			Munster		All-Ireland		Total	
Team	Year	Division	Apps	Score	Apps	Score	Apps	Score	Apps	Score
Cork	2019	Division 1A	0	0-00	4	0-00	2	0-00	6	0-00
Cork	2020	Division 1A	3	0-00	0	0-00	1	0-00	4	0-00
Cork	2021	Division 1A	3	0-00	1	0-00	4	0-01	8	0-01
Cork	2022	Division 1A	5	0-00	4	0-00	2	0-00	11	0-00
Cork	2023	Division 1A	5	0-00	4	0-00	—		9	0-00
Cork	2024	Division 1A	3	0-00	3	0-01	4	0-01	10	0-02
Cork	2025	Division 1A	7	0-00	4	0-00	2	0-01	13	0-01
Cork	2026	Division 1A	6	0-00	5	0-00	1	0-00	12	0-00
Career total			32	0-00	25	0-01	16	0-03	73	0-04

== Honours ==
University College Cork

- Fitzgibbon Cup: 2019, 2020

Castlelyons

- Munster Intermediate Club Hurling Championship: 2023
- Cork Premier Intermediate Hurling Championship: 2023

Imokilly

- Cork Senior Hurling Championship: 2017, 2018

Cork

- National Hurling League: 2025
- Munster Under-21 Hurling Championship: 2018

Awards

- GAA GPA All Stars Awards (1): 2026

Sporting positions
Preceded by Eoghan Murphy	Cork Minor Hurling Captain; 2016	Succeeded by Seán O'Leary-Hayes
