= Lowney =

Lowney may refer to:

- Lowney, West Virginia, an unincorporated community in the United States
- David Lowney (born 1997), Irish hurler
- Declan Lowney (born 1960), Irish television and film director
- Garrett Lowney (born 1979), American Greco-Roman wrestler
- Paul B. Lowney (1917–2007), American author and humorist
- The Walter M. Lowney Company of Canada, maker of Cherry Blossom (candy)
