= 2020 Fitzgibbon Cup =

Irish collegiate hurling tournament

- Dates: 12 January 2020 - 12 February 2020
- Teams: 14
- Sponsor: Electric Ireland
- Champions: University College Cork (40th title); Paddy O'Loughlin (captain); Eoghan Murphy (captain); Tom Kingston (manager)
- Runners-up: Institute of Technology, Carlow; Cathal Dunbar (captain); Enda Rowland (captain); D. J. Carey (manager)

Tournament statistics
- Matches played: 24
- Goals scored: 61 (2.54 per match)
- Points scored: 829 (34.54 per match)
- Top scorer(s): Cian Darcy (2-45)

The 2020 Fitzgibbon Cup was the 104th staging of the Fitzgibbon Cup since its establishment by the Gaelic Athletic Association in 1912. It is sponsored by Electric Ireland, and known as the Electric Ireland HE GAA Fitzgibbon Cup for sponsorship purposes. The draw for the group stage fixtures took place on 4 December 2019. The 2020 Fitzgibbon Cup started with the group stage on 12 January 2020 and ended on 12 February 2020.

University College Cork were the defending champions.

On 12 February 2020, University College Cork won the Fitzgibbon Cup after a 0–18 to 2–11 defeat of the Institute of Technology, Carlow in the final. This was their 40th cup title overall and their second title in succession.

University of Limerick's Cian Darcy was the Fitzgibbon Cup top scorer with 2-45.

== Group stage ==
=== Group A ===
==== Table ====
Team	Matches				Score			Pts
Team	Pld	W	D	L	For	Against	Diff	Pts
DCU Dóchas Éireann	3	3	0	0	5-66	2-41	+34	6
University of Limerick	3	2	0	1	3-60	1-47	+19	4
Maynooth University	3	1	0	2	2-41	1-56	-12	2
Trinty College	3	0	0	3	1-39	7-62	-41	0

==== Fixtures and results ====
12 January 2020 Round 1	DCU Dóchas Éireann	0-21 - 0-18	University of Limerick	DCU Sportsgrounds
	D Burke 0-13 (11f), B Ryan, F Whitely 0-2 each, D Reck, C Firman, J Donnelly, R O’Connor 0-1 each.	Report	C Darcy 0-15 (10f), K Hayes 0-2, R Hayes 0-1.	Referee: J Owens (Wexford)

12 January 2020 Round 1	Trinity College	0-15 - 0-16	Maynooth University	Santry Avenue
	T Aherne (0-10, 10 frees), C O’Sullivan, A Kavanagh (0-2 each), D Duggan (0-1).	Report	A Gaffney (0-11, 11 frees), C Stakelum (0-2), S Clerkin, C Browne, C Drennan (0-1 each).	Referee: D Hughes (Kilkenny)

19 January 2020 Round 2	Maynooth University	1-12 - 1-20	DCU Dóchas Éireann	Maynooth University
	C Drennan (1-8 (5f, 1 ’65); A Gaffney (f), E Molloy, E Aherne and C Stakelum 0-1 each.	Report	R O’Connor (0-7f); J Burke (0-4); D Burke (1-0); B Ryan (0-3); J Roberts (0-2); C Burke, F Whitely, C Hearne and J Ryan (0-1 each).	Referee: G McGrath (Wexford)

19 January 2020 Round 2	University of Limerick	3-21 - 0-13	Trinity College	UL Grounds
	C Darcy 2-6 (six frees), R Lynch 1-5, P O’Loughlin 0-3, J Morris 0-2, K McDonald, P Campion, J Shelly, K Hayes, M Carey 0-1 each	Report	C O’Sullivan 0-5 (three frees, one sideline), T Aherne 0-3 (three frees), D Ryan 0-3, E Mac Domhnaill, R Gorey 0-1 each.	Referee: F Horgan (Tipperary)

22 January 2020 Round 3	Trinity College	1-11 - 4-25	DCU Dóchas Éireann	Santry Avenue
				Referee: S Stack (Dublin)

23 January 2020 Round 3	University of Limerick	0-21 - 1-13	Maynooth University	UL Grounds
	C Darcy 0-9 (six frees), J Morris 0-6, S Golden and R Lynch 0-2 each, P O'Loughlin and M Keoghan 0-1 each		A Gaffney 0-6 (four frees, one '65), E Molloy 1-0, C Drennan 0-2 (one free), C Stakelum, C Browne, J Cullen, E Ahern and S Clerkin 0-1 each	Referee: C McAllister (Cork)

=== Group B ===
==== Table ====
Team	Matches				Score			Pts
Team	Pld	W	D	L	For	Against	Diff	Pts
Mary Immaculate College	3	3	0	0	7-54	2-43	+26	6
Waterford Institute of Technology	3	2	0	1	5-61	3-37	+30	4
Limerick Institute of Technology	3	1	0	2	2-32	5-47	-24	2
Technological University Dublin	3	0	0	3	1-22	5-42	-32	0

==== Fixtures and results ====
12 January 2020 Round 1	Technological University Dublin	1-10 - 1-19	Mary Immaculate College	Grangegorman

12 January 2020 Round 1	Limerick Institute of Technology	1-14 - 1-23	Waterford Institute of Technology	Limerick Institute of Technology
	B Seymour 1-11 (9f, 1 ’65), B McDonagh 0-2, K Howard 0-1.	Report	S Condon 0-12 (10f), A Gleeson 0-5 (1f), E Meany 1-0, J Prendergast and T Barron 0-2 each, C Lyons and R Flynn 0-1 each.	Referee: F Horgan (Tipperary)

19 January 2020 Round 2	Mary Immaculate College	4-24 - 1-18	Limerick Institute of Technology	Mary Immaculate College Grounds
	G Cooney 2-3, A Ormond 0-4, C O’Brien 0-4, C Bourke 0-4 (0-3f), T O’Mahony, P Wall 1-0 each, S Ryan, E McBride, D Ryan 0-2 each, J Gillane (0-1f), E Cahill, D Peters 0-1 each.	Report	B Seymour 0-6 (0-4f), R Byrnes 0-5 (0-2f), R Bonnar 1-1, M Moloney 0-3, E Fitzpatrick 0-2, B Fanning, D O’Connell 0-1 each.	Referee: C McAllister (Cork)

19 January 2020 Round 2	Waterford Institute of Technology	4-23 - 0-12	Technological University Dublin	Waterford IT Grounds
	S Condon (0-11, 9 frees, 1 65); C Kirwan (2-2); C Flood (1-3); E Meaney (1-1); T Barron (0-2); C Lyons, A Gleeson, M Whelan, J Prendergast (0-1 each).	Report	R Clarke (0-6, frees); D Jordan, D Keogh (0-2 each); C Dowling, N Potterton (0-1 each).	Referee: P Murphy (Carlow)

23 January 2020 Round 3	Mary Immaculate College	2-11 - 0-15	Waterford Institute of Technology	MICL Grounds
	C Bourke 0-7 (0-6f), T O’Mahony 0-3, G Cooney 1-0, S Ryan 1-0 each, D Ryan (0-01)	Report	S Condon 0-7 (0-5f, 0-1 ’65), C Flood 0-3, C Lyons, B Nolan (0-2f) 0-2 each, M Mahony 0-1.	Referee: P Carroll (Tipperary)

23 January 2020 Round 3	Limerick Institute of Technology	w/o - scr.	Technological University Dublin	TU Dublin City Campus

=== Group C ===
==== Table ====
Team	Matches				Score			Pts
Team	Pld	W	D	L	For	Against	Diff	Pts
University College Cork	2	2	0	0	0-41	0-32	+9	4
NUI Galway	2	1	0	1	1-32	0-30	-5	2
Cork Institute of Technology	2	0	0	2	0-26	1-37	-14	0

==== Fixtures and results ====
12 January 2020 Round 1	NUI Galway	0-17 - 0-19	University College Cork	Dangan Sports Facilities
	E Niland 0-12 (0-9 f, 0-1 65), I Fox 0-2, P Hoban, M Lynch and S Kennedy 0-1 each.	Report	S Conway 0-7 (0-4 f, 0-1 pen), M O’Halloran, P O’Loughlin (f) and D Griffin 0-2 each, B Hennessy, R O’Flynn, C Boylan, M Coleman, A Casey and M Kehoe 0-1 each.	Referee: J Murphy (Limerick)

19 January 2020 Round 2	University College Cork	0-22 - 0-15	Cork Institute of Technology	The Mardyke
	S Kingston 0-7, S Conway 0-5 (0-4 f), R O’Flynn and D Griffin 0-2 each, D Lowney, M Coleman, P O’Loughlin, C Boylan, M O’Halloran, M Kehoe 0-1 each	Report	L O’Shea 0-9 (0-6 f), M Ryan 0-2, S O’Leary-Hayes, D Lyons, R Walsh, B Everard 0-1 each.	Referee: T Walsh (Waterford)

23 January 2020 Round 3	Cork Institute of Technology	0-11 - 1-15	NUI Galway	Cork IT
	L O'Shea 0-5 (4 frees), D Lyons 0-3, J Doyle 0-2 and C O'Carroll 0-1		E Niland 0-9 (6 frees, 1 '65), S Loftus 1-2, S Burke 0-2, M Lynch and C Elwood 0-1 each	Referee: R McGann (Clare)

=== Group D ===
==== Table ====
Team	Matches				Score			Pts
Team	Pld	W	D	L	For	Against	Diff	Pts
Institute of Technology, Carlow	2	2	0	0	4-36	3-29	+10	4
University College Dublin	2	1	0	1	6-35	5-38	0	2
Galway-Mayo Institute of Technology	2	0	0	2	3-31	5-35	-10	0

==== Fixtures and results ====
12 January 2020 Round 1	University College Dublin	2-16 - 3-20	Institute of Technology, Carlow	Belfield
	R Hayes (0-11, 9 frees); C McGuckin (2-0); P Crummey (0-3); M Purcell, R Purcell (0-1 each).	Report	C Dunbar (1-4); C Nolan (1-3, 2 frees); L Blanchfield (1-2); E Rowland (0-5 frees); R Leahy (0-2); M Harney, L Scanlon, N Brassil, R Higgins (0-1 each).	Referee: J Keenan (Wicklow)

17 January 2020 Round 2	Institute of Technology, Carlow	1-16 - 1-13	Galway-Mayo Institute of Technology	Institute of Technology, Carlow
	C Dunbar 1-4, N Brassil, S Casey (all frees), E Rowland (all frees) 0-3 each, C Nolan 0-2, R Higgins 0-1.	Report	E Egan 1-2, 0-2 frees, J Forde 0-3 (all frees), E Duggan, R Murphy (0-1 free), S Bleahene 0-2 each, D Mannion, D McPeake 0-1 each.	Referee: T Gleeson (Dublin)

22 January 2020 Round 3	Galway-Mayo Institute of Technology	2-18 - 4-19	University College Dublin	Carnmore Hurling Club
	M Kennedy 0-7f, S Bleahane 1-2, N Coen 1-0, J Coyne 0-3 (0-1 sideline), D Mannion 0-2, D McPeake, R Murphy, C Fahy (f) & D Fahy 0-1 each.	Report	R Hayes 1-11 (1-0 pen, 0-9f, 0-1 ’65), P Crummey 1-2, R Purcell 1-1, K Desmond 1-0, E Foley, C McGuckin, E Egan, C Scallan & M Cody 0-1 each.	Referee: M Murtagh (Westmeath)

== Knockout stage ==
=== Quarter-finals ===
29 January 2020 Quarter-final	Mary Immaculate College	2-21 - 1-21 (aet)	University of Limerick	Mary Immaculate College Grounds
	C Bourke 0-10 (0-10f), A Ormond 1-2, T O'Mahony 0-4 (0-2 sideline), G Cooney 1-1, E Cahill 0-2 (0-1f), S Ryan and J Gillane (0-1f) 0-1 each		C Darcy 0-15 (0-11f), S Golden 1-0, J Morris 0-3 (0-1f), P Campion, B O'Mara and C O'Callaghan 0-1 each	Referee: M Murtagh (Westmeath)

29 January 2020 Quarter-final	University College Cork	1-20 - 2-12	University College Dublin	The Mardyke
	S Conway 0-10 (0-6f), S Kingston 1-1, M Kehoe, M Coleman (0-1f) 0-2 each, B Hennessey, D Fitzgibbon, D Griffin, R O'Flynn and M O'Halloran (0-1f) 0-1 each		R Hayes 1-8 (1-0 pen, 0-5f, 0-3 '65s), C McGuckin 1-0, R Purcell 0-3 and L McDwyer 0-1	Referee: F Horgan (Tipperary)

30 January 2020 Quarter-final	DCU Dóchas Éireann	1-23 - 2-14	Waterford Institute of Technology	DCU Sportsgrounds
	J Donnelly 0-6, R O’Connor 0-4 (0-3f, 0-1 65), J Ryan 1-3, J Burke 0-3, J Bergin, B Ryan and R McBride 0-2 each, D Reck 0-1.	Report	S Condon 0-10 (0-9f), B Nolan 1-1 (1-0 pen, 0-1f), A Gleeson 1-0 (1-0f), T Barron 0-2, C Lyons 0-1.	Referee: P O'Dwyer (Carlow)

30 January 2020 Quarter-final	Institute of Technology, Carlow	5-21 - 0-28 (aet)	NUI Galway	Institute of Technology, Carlow
		Report		Referee: J Owens (Wexford)

=== Semi-finals ===
8 February 2020 Semi-final	Mary Immaculate College	0-15 - 5-14	Institute of Technology, Carlow	DCU Sportsgrounds
	C Bourke 0-9 (0-8f, 0-1 '65), T O'Mahony 0-3 (0-2f), G Cooney 0-2 and S Ryan 0-1		C Dunbar 2-0, S Casey 0-6 (0-4f), C Nolan 1-1, S Bergin, L Blanchfield 1-0, E Rowland (0-2f), J Kelly, R Leahy 0-2 each and E Gaughan 0-1	Referee: J Keenan

8 February 2020 Semi-final	DCU Dóchas Éireann	0-17 - 0-18	University College Cork	DCU Sportsgrounds
	R O'Connor 0-11 (0-10), J Bergin 0-2, D Burke, A Mullen, D Mullen and J Burke 0-1 each		S Conway 0-8 (0-7), S Kingston 0-3, N Montgomery 0-2, D Fitzgibbon, R O'Flynn, M O'Halloran, M Kehoe and M Coleman (0-1sl) 0-1 each	Referee: F Horgan (Tipperary)

=== Final ===
12 February 2020 Final	Institute of Technology, Carlow	2-11 - 0-18	University College Cork	DCU Sportsgrounds
	S Casey 1-4 (0-4f), L Blanchfield 1-0, C Nolan 0-3, E Rowland 0-2 (0-2f), J Kelly and S Bergin 0-1 each		S Conway 0-9 (0-7f), S Kingston 0-4, D Fitzgibbon 0-2, M Kehoe, N Montgomery and P O'Loughlin (0-1f) 0-1 each	Referee: J Owens (Wexford)

== Statistics ==
=== Top scorers ===
Top scorers overall

Rank	Player	Club	Tally	Total	Matches	Average
1	Cian Darcy	University of Limerick	2-45	51	4	15.25
2	Stephen Condon	Waterford Institute of Technology	0-40	40	4	10.00
3	Evan Niland	National University of Ireland Galway	0-39	39	3	13.00
Shane Conway	University College Cork	0-39	39	5	7.80	
4	Ronan Hayes	University College Dublin	2-30	36	3	12.00

Top scorers in a single game

Rank	Player	Club	Tally	Total	Opposition
1	Evan Niland	National University of Ireland Galway	0-18	18	IT Carlow
2	Cian Darcy	University of Limerick	0-15	15	Mary Immaculate College
2	Cian Darcy	University of Limerick	0-15	15	DCU Dóchas Éireann
3	Billy Seymour	Limerick Institute of Technology	1-11	14	Waterford Institute of Technology
3	Ronan Hayes	University College Dublin	1-11	14	Galway-Mayo Institute of Technology
4	Donal Burke	DCU Dóchas Éireann	0-13	13	University of Limerick
5	Cian Darcy	University of Limerick	2-06	12	Trinity
5	Evan Niland	NUI Galway	0-12	12	University College Cork
5	Stephen Condon	Waterford Institute of Technology	0-12	12	Limerick Institute of Technology
6	Conor Drennan	Maynooth University	1-08	11	DCU Dóchas Éireann
6	Ronan Hayes	University College Dublin	1-08	11	University College Cork
6	Stephen Condon	Waterford Institute of Technology	0-11	11	Technological University Dublin
6	Ronan Hayes	University College Dublin	0-11	11	Institute of Technology, Carlow
6	Andrew Gaffney	Maynooth University	0-11	11	Trinity College
6	Rory O'Connor	DCU Dóchas Éireann	0-11	11	University College Cork

== Awards ==
Team of the Year

1. Oisín Foley
2. Shane Reck
3. Robert Downey
4. Éanna McBride
5. Paddy O'Loughlin
6. Conor Burke
7. Mark Coleman
8. Darragh Fitzgibbon
9. Richie Leahy
10. Rory O'Connor
11. Shane Conway
12. Cathal Dunbar
13. Chris Nolan
14. Shane Kingston^{HOTY}
15. Tim O'Mahony
