= Tim O'Mahony =

Irish hurler from Cork

Personal information
- Native name: Tadhg Ó Mathúna (Irish)
- Nickname: Pony
- Born: 13 January 1997 (age 29) Newtownshandrum, County Cork, Ireland
- Occupation: Teacher
- Height: 6 ft 3 in (191 cm)

Sport
- Sport: Hurling
- Position: Midfield
Club
Years	Club	Apps (scores)
2014-present	Newtownshandrum	41 (7-89)
Club titles
- Cork titles: 0
College
- Years: College
- 2015-2021: Mary Immaculate College
College titles
- Fitzgibbon titles: 1
Inter-county*
Years	County	Apps (scores)
2016-present	Cork	40 (5-20)
Inter-county titles
- Munster titles: 2
- All-Irelands: 0
- NHL: 1
- All Stars: 0
- *Inter County team apps and scores correct as of 23:04, 14 March 2026.

Timothy O'Mahony (born 13 January 1997) is an Irish hurler who plays as a centre-back for club side Newtownshandrum and at midfield at inter-county level with the Cork senior hurling team. He also teaches at C. B. S. Charleville

== Club career ==
Born and raised in Newtownshandrum, County Cork, O'Mahony first played hurling at juvenile and underage levels with the Newtownshandrum club. He received his secondary education at Charleville CBS and played hurling in all different age-groups with the school, including lining out in the Dr Harty Cup with future inter-county players Darragh Fitzgibbon, Paddy O'Loughlin and Micheál Houlihan.

After progressing through the various grades at club level with Newtownshandrum, O'Mahony made his senior team debut in June 2014 in a first round 1–18 to 1–13 win over Youghal.

O'Mahony later studied at Mary Immaculate College in Limerick and earned selection to the university's hurling team. He won a Fitzgibbon Cup medal as a non-playing substitute in 2019, after the 3–24 to 1–19 win over Institute of Technology, Carlow in the final. O'Mahony was named on the Fitzgibbon Cup Team of the Year in 2020.

== Inter-county career ==
O'Mahony first played for Cork as a member of the minor team during their unsuccessful Munster MHC campaign in 2015. He immediately made the step up the under-21 team, making his first appearance for the team in a seven-point defeat by Limerick in June 2016. After another unsuccessful campaign the following year, O'Mahony won a Munster U21HC medal in July 2018 following Cork's 2–23 to 1–13 defeat of Tipperary in the final. Cork were later beaten by Tipperary in the 2018 All-Ireland U21HC final, in what was his last game in the grade. O'Mahony was later nominated for the Team of the Year.

After being added to the pre-season training panel, O'Mahony made his senior team debut for Cork in January 2016 when he lined out at right corner-forward in a 1–20 to 0-18 Munster League defeat of Kerry. It was his only game during the campaign and he failed to be included on Cork's National League panel.

O'Mahony returned to the Cork team two years later when he played at centre-back in a 1–24 to 0–24 defeat of Kilkenny in January 2018. He lined out in all six of Cork's league games before making his Munster SHC debut in May 2018 when he came on as a substitute for Robbie O'Flynn in the 54th minute of their round 1 game against Clare. He missed the subsequent final defeat of Clare because of a virus, however, he claimed a winners' medal as a member of the extended panel. O'Mahony lined out at wing-back in Cork's 3–32 to 1–22 defeat by Limerick in the 2021 All-Ireland SHC final.

O'Mahony lined out as midfield partner to Darragh Fitzgibbon in Cork's 3–28 to 1-34 extra-time defeat by Clare in the 2024 All-Ireland SHC final. He ended the season by receiving an All-Star award nomination. O'Mahony claimed his first national silverware in April 2025 when Cork won the National Hurling League title following a 3–24 to 0–23 win over Tipperary in the final. Later that season, he won his second Munster SHC medal after a penalty shootout defeat of Limerick in the 2025 Munster SHC final. O'Mahony again partnered Darragh Fitzgibbon at midfield for the 3–27 to 1–18 defeat by Tipperary in the 2025 All-Ireland SHC final, in what was a second consecutive defeat in the final and a third defeat in five seasons. He ended the season, once again, by being nominated for an All-Star award.

== Personal life ==
O'Mahony's brother, Gerdy, won an All-Ireland MHC medal with Cork in 2001. He is also the cousin of Ben O'Connor.

== Career statistics ==
=== Club ===
As of 26 September 2025.

Team	Year	Cork PSHC	
Team	Year	Apps	Score
Newtownshandrum	2014	3	1-00
Newtownshandrum	2015	3	0-04
Newtownshandrum	2016	4	2-08
Newtownshandrum	2017	3	0-02
Newtownshandrum	2018	2	2-03
Newtownshandrum	2019	4	1-12
Newtownshandrum	2020	3	0-06
Newtownshandrum	2021	3	0-02
Newtownshandrum	2022	5	0-14
Newtownshandrum	2023	3	0-09
Newtownshandrum	2024	4	1-08
Newtownshandrum	2025	4	0-21
Career total		41	7-89

=== Inter-county ===
As of 7 June 2026

Team	Year	National League			Munster		All-Ireland		Total	
Team	Year	Division	Apps	Score	Apps	Score	Apps	Score	Apps	Score
Cork	2018	Division 1A	6	0-02	3	0-00	1	0-00	10	0-02
Cork	2019	Division 1A	6	0-04	2	0-03	2	0-01	10	0-08
Cork	2020	Division 1A	5	1-02	1	0-00	2	0-01	8	1-03
Cork	2021	Division 1A	4	1-05	1	0-01	4	1-01	9	2-07
Cork	2022	Division 1A	6	1-05	4	1-03	2	0-00	12	2-08
Cork	2023	Division 1A	1	0-01	3	0-02	—		4	0-03
Cork	2024	Division 1A	3	0-01	4	0-01	4	0-03	11	0-05
Cork	2025	Division 1A	7	1-06	5	1-03	2	2-01	14	4-10
Cork	2026	Division 1A	6	1-11	5	0-08	0	0-00	11	1-19
Career total			44	5-37	28	2-21	17	3-07	89	10-65

== Honours ==
Mary Immaculate College

- Fitzgibbon Cup (1): 2017

Cork

- Munster Senior Hurling Championship (2): 2018, 2025
- National Hurling League (1): 2025
- Munster Under-21 Hurling Championship (1): 2018
