= Paddy O'Loughlin =

Irish hurler (born 1997)

Personal information
- Native name: Pádraig Ó Lochlainn (Irish)
- Born: 6 August 1997 (age 29) Kilmallock, County Limerick, Ireland
- Occupation: Student
- Height: 6 ft 4 in (193 cm)

Sport
- Sport: Hurling
- Position: Left wing-back
Club
- Years: Club
- Kilmallock
Club titles
- Limerick titles: 1
- Munster titles: 1
- All-Ireland Titles: 0
College
- Years: College
- University College Cork
College titles
- Fitzgibbon titles: 2
Inter-county*
Years	County	Apps (scores)
2018–present	Limerick	6 (0–02)
Inter-county titles
- Munster titles: 2
- All-Irelands: 2
- NHL: 2
- All Stars: 0
- *Inter County team apps and scores correct as of 20:00, 13 December 2020.

Paddy O'Loughlin (born 6 August 1997) is an Irish hurler who plays as a centre-forward for club side Kilmallock and at inter-county level with the Limerick senior hurling team.

== Playing career ==
=== University College Cork ===
After lining out for the University College Cork freshers' team in his first year at university, O'Loughlin was added to the senior team in advance of the 2020 Fitzgibbon Cup. On 23 February 2019, he won a Fitzgibbon Cup medal after lining out in UCC's 2–21 to 0–13 defeat of Mary Immaculate College in the final.

O'Loughlin played in a second successive Fitzgibbon Cup final on 12 February 2020. Captaining the team from centre-back, he ended the game with a second successive winners' medal after the 0–18 to 2–11 defeat of the Institute of Technology, Carlow.

=== Kilmallock ===
O'Loughlin joined the Kilmallock club at a young age and played in all grades at juvenile and underage levels, before joining the club's senior team.

On 19 October 2014, O'Loughlin won a Limerick Championship from centre-back following a 1–15 to 0–14 defeat of reigning champions Na Piarsaigh. He later won a Munster Championship medal after a 1–32 to 3–18 extra-time defeat of Cratloe in the final. On 17 March 2015, O'Loughlin came on as a substitute for Kilmallock in their 1–18 to 1–06 defeat by Ballyhale Shamrocks in the All-Ireland final at Croke Park.

=== Limerick ===
==== Minor and under-21 ====
O'Loughlin first played for Limerick at minor level. On 22 July 2014, he was at full-back when Limerick won their second successive Munster Championship title after a 0–24 to 0–18 defeat of Waterford in the final. On 7 September 2014, O'Loughlin was again at full-back in Limerick's 2–17 to 0–19 defeat by Kilkenny in the All-Ireland final.

O'Loughlin's second and final season with the Limerick minor hurling team ended with an All-Ireland quarter-final defeat by Galway.

O'Loughlin joined the Limerick under-21 team in 2016 but was an unused substitute for Limerick's unsuccessful championship campaign. After being dropped from the panel the following year, O'Loughlin made his first appearance for the team on 7 May 2018 in a 3–18 to 0–13 Munster Championship defeat of Clare.

==== Senior ====
In November 2017, O'Loughlin was added to the Limerick senior hurling panel and made his first appearance for the team during the pre-season Munster League. He made his first appearance in the National Hurling League on 28 January 2018 in a 1–25 to 0–18 defeat of Laois. On 19 August 2018, O'Loughlin was a member of the extended panel when Limerick won their first All-Ireland title in 45 years after a 3–16 to 2–18 defeat of Galway in the final.

On 31 March 2019, O'Loughlin was named on the bench for Limerick's National League final meeting with Waterford at Croke Park. He collected a winners' medal as a non-playing substitute in the 1–24 to 0–19 victory. O'Loughlin made his Munster Championship debut on 2 June 2019 when he lined out at left wing-back in a 2–24 to 0–10 defeat of Waterford. On 30 June 2019, O'Loughlin won a Munster Championship medal as a non-playing substitute following Limerick's 2–26 to 2–14 defeat of Tipperary in the final.

After making a substitute appearance in the 2020 All-Ireland Senior Hurling Championship Final, O'Loughlin withdrew from the Limerick hurling panel "for personal reasons" ahead of the 2021 season.

== Career statistics ==
As of match played 13 December 2020.

Team	Year	National League			Munster		All-Ireland		Total	
Team	Year	Division	Apps	Score	Apps	Score	Apps	Score	Apps	Score
Limerick	2018	Division 1B	4	0-00	0	0-00	0	0-00	4	0-00
Limerick	2019	Division 1A	4	1–18	3	0-02	0	0-00	7	0-03
Limerick	2020	Division 1A	4	0-03	1	0-00	2	0-00	7	0-03
Total			12	0-04	4	0-02	2	0-00	18	0-03

== Honours ==
University College Cork

- Fitzgibbon Cup (2): 2019, 2020

Kilmallock

- Munster Senior Club Hurling Championship (1): 2014
- Limerick Senior Hurling Championship (1): 2014

Limerick

- All-Ireland Senior Hurling Championship (2): 2018, 2020
- Munster Senior Hurling Championship (2): 2019, 2020
- National Hurling League (2): 2019, 2020
- Munster Senior Hurling League (2): 2018, 2020
- Munster Minor Hurling Championship (1): 2014
