= Conor Browne =

Irish hurler

Personal information
- Native name: Conchur de Brún (Irish)
- Nickname: Worm
- Born: 18 May 1996 (age 30) Kilkenny, Ireland
- Occupation: Primary school teacher
- Height: 6 ft 0 in (183 cm)

Sport
- Sport: Hurling
- Position: Midfield
Club
- Years: Club
- 2014-present: James Stephens
Club titles
- Kilkenny titles: 0
College(s)
- Years: College
- 2015-2016 2016-present: Cork Institute of Technology; University College Cork
College titles
- Fitzgibbon titles: 1
Inter-county*
Years	County	Apps (scores)
2018-present	Kilkenny	9 (0-03)
Inter-county titles
- Leinster titles: 2
- All-Irelands: 0
- NHL: 1
- All Stars: 0
- *Inter County team apps and scores correct as of 22:53, 17 July 2021.

Conor Browne (born 18 May 1996) is an Irish hurler who plays for Kilkenny Senior Championship club James Stephens and at inter-county level with the Kilkenny senior hurling team. He usually lines out as a midfielder.

== Playing career ==
=== St. Kieran's College ===
Browne first came to prominence as a hurler with St. Kieran's College in Kilkenny. He played in every grade of hurling before eventually joining the college's senior hurling team. On 9 March 2014, he was an unused substitute when local rival Kilkenny CBS defeated St. Kieran's College by 2–13 to 0–13 to win the Leinster Championship. Browne was again listed as a substitute when the two sides faced each other again in the All-Ireland final on 5 April 2014. He was introduced as a substitute for Eoin Walsh at left wing-back and collected a winners' medal following the 2–16 to 0–13 defeat.

=== Cork Institute of Technology ===
Browne spent a year studying at the Cork Institute of Technology and was included on the freshers' hurling team during that time. On 3 March 2016, he captained the team from midfield when CIT defeated Dublin City University by 1–13 to 0–13 to win the All-Ireland title.

=== University College Cork ===
On 23 February 2019, Browne was joint-captain of the University College Cork that faced Mary Immaculate College in the Fitzgibbon Cup final. He scored 1-01 play in the 2–21 to 0–13 victory.

=== James Stephens ===
Browne joined the James Stephens club at a young age and played in all grades at juvenile and underage levels before joining the club's top adult team. He made his first appearance on 12 October 2014 in a 1–20 to 0–18 defeat by Clara.

=== Kilkenny ===
==== Minor and under-21 ====
Browne was selected for the Kilkenny minor team for the first time during the 2014 Leinster Championship. He made his first appearance for the team on 21 June 2014 and scored 0-02 from midfield in a 1–21 to 0–16 defeat of Laois in the semi-final. Browne was again at midfield for the Leinster final against Dublin on 6 July and collected a winners' medal following the 2–19 to 2–10 victory. On 7 September, he won an All-Ireland medal from midfield following Kilkenny's 2–17 to 0–19 defeat of Limerick in the final. It was his last game in the minor grade.

Browne was drafted onto the Kilkenny under-21 team for the 2016 Leinster Championship. He made his first appearance on 25 May 2016 when he lined out at midfield in a 1–11 to 0–12 defeat by Westmeath.

Browne failed to secure a place on the starting fifteen for the 2017 Leinster Championship but was retained as a member of the extended panel. On 5 July 2017, he won a Leinster Championship medal as a member of the extended panel following Kilkenny's 0–30 to 1–15 defeat of Wexford in the final. On 9 September, Browne failed to be included on the 24-man panel for the 0–17 to 0-11 All-Ireland final defeat by Limerick.

==== Senior ====
Browne joined the Kilkenny senior team prior to the start of the 2018 National League. He made his first appearance for the team on 25 February 2018 when he lined out at left wing-back in a 2–22 to 2–21 defeat of Tipperary. Walsh remained as a member of the extended panel for the Leinster Championship. Browne made his first Leinster Championship appearance on 20 May 2018 when he came on as a 52nd-minute substitute for Lester Ryan at midfield in a 2–19 to 1–13 defeat of Offaly.

On 30 June 2019, Browne was an unused substitute when Kilkenny suffered a 1–23 to 0–23 defeat by Wexford in the Leinster final. On 18 August 2019, he was selected at midfield when Kilkenny faced Tipperary in the All-Ireland final, however, Browne ended the game on the losing side after a 3–25 to 0–20 defeat.

== Personal life ==
Browne's grandfather, Shem Downey, was an All-Ireland medal-winner with Kilkenny in 1947. His mother, Angela Downey-Browne, and his aunt, Ann Downey, won 12 All-Ireland medals each with the Kilkenny senior camogie team between 1974 and 1994.

== Career statistics ==
As of match played 17 July 2021.

Team	Year	National League			Leinster		All-Ireland		Total	
Team	Year	Division	Apps	Score	Apps	Score	Apps	Score	Apps	Score
Kilkenny	2018	Division 1A	2	0-01	1	0-00	0	0-00	3	0-01
Kilkenny	2019	Division 1A	4	0-01	0	0-00	3	0-01	7	0-02
Kilkenny	2020	Division 1B	2	0-00	2	0-02	1	0-00	5	0-02
Kilkenny	2021	Division 1B	4	0-02	2	0-00	0	0-00	6	0-02
Total			12	0-04	5	0-02	4	0-01	21	0-07

== Honours ==
St. Kieran's College

- Dr. Croke Cup: 2014

Cork Institute of Technology

- All-Ireland Freshers' Hurling Championship: 2016 (c)

University College Cork

- Fitzgibbon Cup: 2019 (captain)

Kilkenny

- Leinster Senior Hurling Championship: 2020, 2021
- National Hurling League: 2018
- Leinster Under-21 Hurling Championship: 2017
- All-Ireland Minor Hurling Championship: 2014
- Leinster Minor Hurling Championship: 2014
