= Tom Clancy (Gaelic footballer) =

Irish Gaelic footballer

Thomas Clancy
Personal information
- Native name: Tomás Mac Lannchaidh (Irish)
- Born: 13 February 1992 (age 34) Bishopstown, Cork, Ireland
- Occupation: Teacher
- Height: 6 ft 1 in (185 cm)

Sport
- Sport: Gaelic football
- Position: Centre-back
Club
- Years: Club
- 2009–present: Clonakilty
Club titles
- Cork titles: 0
Inter-county*
Years	County	Apps (scores)
2013–present	Cork	8 (0-00)
Inter-county titles
- Munster titles: 0
- All-Irelands: 0
- NHL: 0
- All Stars: 0
- *Inter County team apps and scores correct as of 00:29, 31 July 2014.

Thomas Clancy (born 13 February 1992) is an Irish Gaelic footballer who plays as a centre-back for the Cork senior team.

Born in Clonakilty, County Cork, Clancy first played competitive Gaelic football during his schooling at Clonakilty Community College. He arrived on the inter-county scene at the age of eighteen when he first linked up with the Cork minor team, before later joining the under-21 side. He made his senior debut during the 2013 championship. Since then Clancy has become a regular member of the starting fifteen.

At club level Clancy has won several championship medals with Clonakilty.

== Simple assault guilty plea ==
On July 4, 2023, Clancy was ordered to pay a woman €1,000 after he admitted taking her hand without consent after following her into a laundry room while he was celebrating his cousin's wedding. Clancy pleaded guilty to the simple assault at a previous court hearing and Clonakilty District Court heard he had no memory of the incident, which occurred on June 3, 2022.

The woman, a minor at the time of the incident, had not initially wanted to make a complaint. The court heard the woman had, in the presence of her mother, declined the invitation to make a victim impact statement and had also declined the opportunity to attend court. While Clancy said he had no recollection of the event due to a high level of intoxication on his part, he did not dispute the woman's version of events. He had already written her a letter of apology by the time the judge ordered him to make payment. The judge said to convict would be “entirely disproportionate” and instead granted Clancy the benefit of the Probation Act, on a bond for three years and without Probation Service supervision.

== Honours ==
=== Team ===
Clonakilty Community College

- All-Ireland Vocational Schools Senior A Football Championship (1): 2010
- Munster Vocational Schools Senior Football Championship (1): 2010

Clonakilty

- Cork Senior Football Championship (1): 2009 (sub)
- West Cork Junior A Hurling Championship (1): 2012 2015

Cork

- Munster Under-21 Football Championship (3): 2011, 2012, 2013
- Munster Minor Football Championship (1): 2010
