= Joe Grimes =

Irish Gaelic footballer

Personal information
- Native name: Seosamh Ó Gréacháin (Irish)
- Born: 1996 (age 29–30) Listowel, County Cork, Ireland
- Occupation: Garda Síochána

Sport
- Sport: Gaelic Football
- Position: Midfield
Clubs
- Years: Club
- Listowel Emmets → Feale Rangers; Clonakilty
Club titles
- Cork titles: 0
Inter-county*
Years	County	Apps (scores)
2022	Cork	0 (0-00)
Inter-county titles
- Munster titles: 0
- All-Irelands: 0
- NFL: 0
- All Stars: 0
- *Inter County team apps and scores correct as of 16:45, 29 January 2022.

Joseph Grimes (born 1996) is an Irish Gaelic footballer. At club level he has played with Listowel Emmets, Clonakilty, divisional side Feale Rangers, and at inter-county level with the Cork senior football team.

== Career ==
Grimes first played competitive Gaelic football with the Listowel Emmets club, while also lining out for divisional side Feale Rangers. He transferred to the Clonakilty club in 2020, a move which saw him line out in the 2021 Cork PSFC final defeat by St. Finbarr's. Grimes first appeared on the inter-county scene when he was selected for the Cork senior football team for the pre-season McGrath Cup competition in 2022. He later earned inclusion on the team's National League panel.

== Career statistics ==
As of match played 29 January 2022.

Team	Year	National League			Munster		All-Ireland		Total	
Team	Year	Division	Apps	Score	Apps	Score	Apps	Score	Apps	Score
Cork	2022	Division 2	0	0-00	0	0-00	0	0-00	0	0-00
Total			0	0-00	0	0-00	0	0-00	20	0-00
