= Ronan Hayes =

Irish hurler

Personal information
- Native name: Rónán Ó hAodha (Irish)
- Born: 1998 (age 27–28) Stillorgan, Dublin, Ireland

Sport
- Sport: Hurling
- Position: Full-forward
Club
- Years: Club
- Kilmacud Crokes
Club titles
- Dublin titles: 1
College(s)
- Years: College
- 2017-2021 2021-2022: University College Dublin; Dublin City University
College titles
- Fitzgibbon titles: 0
Inter-county*
Years	County	Apps (scores)
2018-present	Dublin	10 (2-08)
Inter-county titles
- Leinster titles: 0
- All-Irelands: 0
- NHL: 0
- All Stars: 0
- *Inter County team apps and scores correct as of 21:45, 27 June 2021.

Ronan Hayes (born 1998) is an Irish hurler who plays for Dublin Senior Championship club Kilmacud Crokes and at inter-county level with the Dublin senior hurling team. He usually lines out as a full-forward.

== Career ==
A member of the Kilmacud Crokes club, Hayes first came to prominence on the inter-county scene with the Dublin minor team that won the 2016 Leinster Minor Championship. He subsequently spent one season with the Dublin under-21 team, while simultaneously lining out with University College Dublin in the Fitzgibbon Cup. Hayes made his senior debut during the 2018 National League.

== Career statistics ==
As of 26 June 2021

Team	Year	National League			Leinster		All-Ireland		Total	
Team	Year	Division	Apps	Score	Apps	Score	Apps	Score	Apps	Score
Dublin	2018	Division 1B	3	2-05	1	0-00	—		4	2-05
Dublin	2019	Division 1B	3	1-00	4	0-02	1	0-02	8	1-04
Dublin	2020	Division 1B	5	1-05	2	1-00	1	0-01	8	2-06
Dublin	2021	Division 1B	5	2-02	1	1-03	0	0-00	6	3-05
Career total			16	6-12	8	2-05	2	0-03	26	8-20

== Honours ==
Dublin

- Leinster Minor Hurling Championship: 2016
