= 2019 Fitzgibbon Cup =

Irish collegiate hurling tournament

- Dates: 20 January 2019 - 23 February 2019
- Teams: 14
- Sponsor: Electric Ireland
- Champions: UCC (39th title); Eoghan Murphy (captain); Conor Browne (captain)
- Runners-up: Mary Immaculate College

Tournament statistics
- Matches played: 24
- Top scorer(s): Evan Niland (0-54)

The 2019 Fitzgibbon Cup was the 103rd staging of the Fitzgibbon Cup since its establishment by the Gaelic Athletic Association in 1912. It was sponsored by Electric Ireland, and known as the Electric Ireland HE GAA Fitzgibbon Cup for sponsorship purposes. The draw for the group stage fixtures took place on 5 December 2018. It started with the group stage on 20 January 2019 and is scheduled to end on 23 February 2019.

The University of Limerick were the defending champions, however, they failed to make it out of the "group of death".

On 23 February 2019, University College Cork won the Fitzgibbon Cup after a 2–21 to 0–13 defeat of Mary Immaculate College in the final. This was their 39th cup title overall and their first title since 2013.

Evan Niland of NUI Galway was the Fitzgibbon Cup top scorer with 0-54.

== Group stage ==
=== Group A ===
==== Table ====
Team	Matches				Score			Pts
Team	Pld	W	D	L	For	Against	Diff	Pts
University College Cork	3	3	0	0	3-66	1-48	+24	6
NUI Galway	3	1	1	1	2-52	4-48	-2	3
University College Dublin	3	1	1	1	7-33	3-54	-9	3
University of Limerick	3	0	0	3	0-52	4-53	-13	0

==== Fixtures and results ====
20 January 2019 Round 1	University College Dublin	3-12 - 1-18	NUI Galway	Dave Billings Park
	R Hayes 0-8 (8f); P Crummey, E Callaghan, S Carey 1-1 each; J Malone 0-1.	Report	E Niland 0-12 (9f); C Sheedy 1-1; I Fox 0-2; D Burke (f), A Geaney, C Whelan 0-1 each.	Referee: P O'Dwyer (Carlow)

20 January 2019 Round 1	University of Limerick	0-20 - 0-26	University College Cork	UL Grounds
	B Murphy (0-4 frees), M Keoghan (0-4 each); J Morris (0-3); R Lynch (0-1 free, 0-1 ‘65), K O’Brien, S Golden (0-2 each); I Galvin, T Morrissey, J Henley (0-1 each).	Report	S Conway (0-9, 0-4 frees); C O’Leary (0-6, 0-3 frees, 0-3 ‘65s); S Kingston, R O’Flynn (0-3 each); M O’Halloran (0-2); M Coleman (0-1 sc), C Brown, D Griffin (0-1 each).	Referee: F Horgan (Tipperary)

23 January 2019 Round 2	University College Cork	2-21 - 1-13	University College Dublin	The Mardyke
	M Kehoe (1-4), S Kingston (0-5), S Conway (0-4, 0-3 frees), N Montgomery (1-0), M Coleman (0-3), C O’Leary (0-1 65m) and C Browne (0-2 each), D Griffin (0-1).	Report	R Hayes (0-6, 0-4 frees, 0-1 65m), B Hogan (1-1 frees), D Fitzgerald (0-2), M Purcell, S Flanagan, R Purcell and S Carey (0-1 each).

24 January 2019 Round 2	NUI Galway	1-19 - 0-17	University of Limerick	Dangan
	E Niland 0-11 (0-9f), M Lynch 1-2, C Whelan 0-2, S Loftus 0-1, D Burke 0-1, C Sheedy 0-1, B Corry 0-1.	Report	B Murphy 0-11 (0-10f), M Carey 0-1, J Shelly 0-1, J Morris 0-1, K O’Brien 0-1, J Goulding 0-1, T Morrissey 0-1.	Referee: F Horgan (Tipperary)

31 January 2019 Round 3	University College Cork	1-19 - 0-15	NUI Galway	The Mardyke
	S Conway 0-7 (0-5f), S Kingston 1-0, C O'Leary 0-3 (0-2f), M Kehoe 0-3, D Griffin 0-2, M Coleman 0-2, E Sheehan 0-1, C Roche 0-1		E Niland 0-9 (0-7f), M Lynch 0-2, C Sheedy 0-1, S Loftus 0-1, I Fox 0-1, D Burke 0-1 (0-1f)	Referee: J Murphy (Tipperary)

31 January 2019 Round 3	University College Dublin	3-08 - 0-15	University of Limerick	Belfield
	R Hayes 0-5 (4f), J Malone 1-1 (1-0 s/line), S Quirke, P Crummey 1-0 each, M Cody, S Carey 0-1 each.	Report	B Murphy 0-6 (5f), B Nash, I Galvin 0-3 each, R Lynch, C Cleary, JP Lucey 0-1 each.	Referee: J Keenan (Wicklow)

=== Group B ===
==== Table ====
Team	Matches				Score			Pts
Team	Pld	W	D	L	For	Against	Diff	Pts
Limerick Institute of Technology	3	3	0	0	8-59	1-33	+47	6
Institute of Technology, Carlow	3	2	0	1	4-53	3-29	+27	4
Trinity College	3	1	0	2	2-31	3-58	-30	2
Garda College	3	0	0	3	1-32	8-55	-44	0

==== Fixtures and results ====
20 January 2019 Round 1	Institute of Technology, Carlow	1-13 - 1-14	Limerick Institute of Technology	Carlow IT
	S Casey 1-7, 0-7f, C Dunbar 0-2, C Nolan (65), E Rowland (f), S Downey, R Leahy 0-1 each.	Report	P Duggan 0-6, 0-5f, B Fanning 1-0, D Dempsey, R Doody, 0-2 each, R Murphy, P Casey, O Kelly, D Byrne (f) 0-1 each.	Referee: J Keenan (Wicklow)

20 January 2019 Round 1	Garda College	0-13 - 1-15	Trinity College	Borrisoleigh
	K Slattery (0-5,4fs), R Barry(0-4,3fs), B O Connell(0-2), D Stapleton, D Sheehan(0-1 each).	Report	F O Riain Broin (0-10, 10fs); M Corry (1-0), C O Sullivan (0-4), J Walsh (0-1).	Referee: S Murphy (Limerick)

24 January 2019 Round 2	Limerick Institute of Technology	4-24 - 0-12	Garda College	Limerick IT
	P Duggan 1-11 (8f), P Casey and O O’Reilly 1-1, B Fanning 1-0, R Doody 0-3, O Kelly and R Byrnes 0-2 each, D Dempsey, D Reidy, R Murphy and J Conway 0-1 each.	Report	R Barry 0-3 (3f), M Heffernan, K Slattery (1f) and E Sheahan 0-2 each, C Russell, B Murphy and C O’Connor 0-1 each.	Referee: D Kirwan (Cork)

24 January 2019 Round 2	Trinity College	1-08 - 0-24	Institute of Technology, Carlow	Santry Avenue
	F Ó Riain Broin 0-4 (3f), C O'Sullivan 1-1, D Butler, M Corry, D Duggan 0-1 each.	Report	C Nolan 0-8 (3f), S Casey 0-4 (2f, 1 '65'), T Nolan 0-3, E Rowland (2f), R Leahy 0-2 each, S Downey, C Dunford, C Dunbar, K Murphy, G Kelly 0-1 each.	Referee: K Brady (Louth)

30 January 2019 Round 3	Limerick Institute of Technology	3-21 - 0-08	Trinity College	Limerick IT
	P Duggan 1-8 (0-4f, 0-1 65, 0-1 sideline); P Casey 1-1; O Kelly 1-0; R Doody, J Conway and J McCarthy 0-3 each; D Reidy 0-2; O O’Reilly 0-1.	Report	F O Riain Broin 0-5 (3f, 1 65); C O’Sullivan 0-3 (0-1 pen).	Referee: T Walsh (Waterford)

31 January 2019 Round 3	Garda College	1-06 - 3-15	Institute of Technology, Carlow	Heywood
	R Barry (1-1), D Sheahan (0-3), B O’Connell (0-1), K Slattery (0-1)	Report	C Nolan (0-5), C Dunford (2-1), S Casey (1-3), S Downey (0-2), T Nolan (0-2), R Leahy (0-1), M Harney (0-1)

=== Group C ===
==== Table ====
Team	Matches				Score			Pts
Team	Pld	W	D	L	For	Against	Diff	Pts
DCU Dóchas Éireann	2	2	0	0	0-39	0-26	+13	4
Cork Institute of Technology	2	1	0	1	0-27	0-32	-5	2
Waterford Institute of Technology	2	0	0	2	0-23	0-31	-8	0

==== Fixtures and results ====
20 January 2019	Waterford Institute of Technology	0-14 - 0-16	DCU Dóchas Éireann	WIT Sports Campus
	S Condon 0-7 (6f); S O'Gorman 0-2; M Whelan, J Prendergast, S Murphy, B Nolan (f) and R Smithers 0-1 each.	Report	J Bergin 0-6 (5f); S Morrissey 0-3; P Foley (1f, 1 65), C Crummey 0-2 each; B Ryan, R McBride and J Donnelly 0-1 each.	Referee: D Kirwan (Cork)

24 January 2019	DCU Dóchas Éireann	0-23 - 0-12	Cork Institute of Technology	DCU Sportsgrounds
	K Doyle 0-6 (2f), J Bergin (4f) and P Foley (4f) 0-4 each, R McBride, D Reck and S Morrissey 0-2 each, F Whitely, D Burke and C Crummey 0-1 each.	Report	J Beausang 0-5 (5f), S Cummins 0-2, P Collins (1f), E O’Shea, J Good, B Everard and A Coffey 0-1 each.	Referee: A Kelly (Galway)

31 January 2019	Cork Institute of Technology	0-15 - 0-09	Waterford Institute of Technology	Cork IT
	J Beausang 0-9 (8f, 1 65), A Coffey and S Cummins 0-2 each, D Noonan and C Prunty 0-1 each.	Report	S Condon 0-4 (3f), B Nolan 0-3 (3f), J Prendergast and S O’Gorman 0-1 each.	Referee: F Horgan (Tipperary)

=== Group D ===
==== Table ====
Team	Matches				Score			Pts
Team	Pld	W	D	L	For	Against	Diff	Pts
Mary Immaculate College	2	2	0	0	2-41	1-26	+18	4
Dublin Institute of Technology	2	1	0	1	5-26	2-28	+7	2
Maynooth University	2	0	0	2	1-21	5-34	-25	0

==== Fixtures and results ====
20 January 2019	Dublin Institute of Technology	1-14 - 1-19	Mary Immaculate College	Grangegorman
	E Dunne 1-7 (0-5fs), N Walsh, E Dillon 0-2 each, D Keogh, A Clarke, B Quinn 0-1 each.	Report	A Gillane 1-15 (0-13fs), T Grimes, L Meade, C English, M O'Loughlin 0-1 each.	Referee: J O'Brien (Laois)

29 January 2019	Mary Immaculate College	1-22 - 0-12	Maynooth University	Mary Immaculate College
	C Guilfoyle 1-3, A Gillane 0-6 (0-6f), C O’Brien 0-4 (0-3f, 0-1’65), M O’Loughlin 0-3, T Monaghan, E Cahill (0-2f) 0-2 each, G Cooney, L Meade 0-1 each.	Report	J Fallon 0-6 (0-3f), C Stakelum 0-3 (0-3f), D Connolly 0-2, R Smith 0-1.	Referee: J Ryan (Tipperary)

31 January 2019	Maynooth University	1-09 - 4-12	Dublin Institute of Technology	Maynooth University North Campus
	J Fallon 0-6fs; C Stakelum 1-0; J Cullen (1f), D Connolly and S Buggy 0-1 each.	Report	E Dunne 1-4 (4fs); D Keogh and L Blanchfield 1-1 each; N Walsh 1-0; C Ryan (‘65) and G Whelan 0-2 each; A Clarke and Q Sanders 0-1 each.	Referee: D Hughes (Carlow)

== Knockout stage ==
=== Quarter-finals ===
7 February 2019 Quarter-final	University College Cork	3-19 - 1-11	Institute of Technology, Carlow	The Mardyke
	M Kehoe 2-3, S Conway 0-6 (0-6f), S Kingston 1-2, C O'Leary 0-4 (0-4f), R O'Flynn 0-2, D Griffin 0-1, M Coleman 0-1	Report	S Casey 0-5 (0-5f), R Leahy 1-1, C Dunbar 0-2, M Redmond 0-1, E Rowland 0-1 (0-1f), R Mullaney 0-1	Referee: F Horgan (Tipperary)

7 February 2019 Quarter-final	Limerick Institute of Technology	2-10 - 1-15	NUI Galway	Moylish
	P Casey 1-3, R Byrnes 1-2, P Duggan 0-3 (0-1f, 0-2 65s), D Dempsey 0-1, J Conway 0-1	Report	E Niland 0-9 (0-7f), C Sheedy 1-1, B Concannon 0-3, C Whelan 0-1, S Loftus 0-1	Referee: J Ryan

7 February 2019 Quarter-final	DCU Dóchas Éireann	2-19 - 0-12	Dublin Institute of Technology	DCU Sports Complex
	J Bergin 0-8 (0-7f), S Morrissey 1-1, D Burke 1-0, K Doyle 0-2, R O'Connor 0-2, J Donnelly 0-2, R McBride 0-1, F Whitely 0-1, D Reck 0-1, F McGibb 0-1	Report	E Dunne 0-7 (0-7f), E Dillon 0-2, L Blanchfield 0-1, N Walsh 0-1, A Clarke 0-1	Referee: S Stack

7 February 2019 Quarter-final	Mary Immaculate College	2-20 - 0-12	Cork Institute of Technology	Mary Immaculate College
	A Gillane 0-8 (0-5f, 0-1 65, 0-1 sideline), T Monaghan 0-4, G Cooney 1-1, L Meade 1-1, P Hickey 0-2, C O'Brien 0-1, T Grimes 0-1, C Guilfoyle 0-1, M O'Loughlin 0-1	Report	J Beausang 0-6 (0-5f), S Cummins 0-2, B Everard 0-1, A Coffey 0-1, W Hurley 0-1, R Walsh 0-1	Referee: T Walsh

=== Semi-finals ===
12 February 2019 Semi-final	University College Cork	2-17 - 0-22 (aet)	DCU Dóchas Éireann	WIT Sports Complex
	S Kingston, C O’Leary (1-0 pen, 1f) 1-5 each, S Conway 0-6 (4fs), M Coleman 0-1.	Report	J Bergin 0-10 (8fs), R O’Connor 0-3, B Ryan, S Morrissey 0-2 each, R McBride, C Crummey, D Mullen, D Reck, D Burke 0-1 each.	Referee: T Walsh (Waterford)

14 February 2019 Semi-final	NUI Galway	0-18 - 1-18	Mary Immaculate College	Cusack Park
	E Niland 0-13 (0-10f), B Concannon 0-2, C Whelan, S Kennedy, L Forde 0-1 each.	Report	A Gillane 1-12 (0-7f, 1-0 pen, 0-1 sideline cut), C O’Brien 0-2, T Monaghan, L Meade, C Guilfoyle, G Cooney 0-1 each.	Referee: J Ryan (Tipperary)

=== Final ===
23 February 2019 Final	University College Cork	2-21 - 0-13	Mary Immaculate College	WIT Sports Campus
	M Kehoe (1-4), S Conway (0-6, 0-5 frees), C Browne (1-1), C Roche (0-3), C O’Leary (0-2 frees), D Griffin, N O’Leary, R O’Flynn, D Fitzgibbon and S Kingston (0-1 each).	Report	A Gillane (0-8 frees), T Monaghan, L Meade, M O’Loughlin, C O’Brien and C English (0-1 each).	Referee: James Owens (Wexford)

== Top scorers ==
Top scorers overall

Rank	Player	Club	Tally	Total	Matches	Average
1	Evan Niland	NUI Galway	0-54	54	5	10.80
2	Aaron Gillane	Mary Immaculate College	2-41	47	4	11.75
3	Peter Duggan	Limerick Institute of Technology	2-28	34	4	8.50
4	Shane Conway	University College Cork	0-32	32	5	6.40
5	James Bergin	DCU Dóchas Éireann	0-28	28	4	7.00
6	Séamus Casey	Institute of Technology, Carlow	2-19	25	4	6.25
7	Shane Kingston	University College Cork	3-15	24	5	4.80
7	Eoghan Dunne	Dublin Institute of Technology	2-18	24	3	8.00
8	Chris O'Leary	University College Cork	1-20	23	5	4.60
9	Barry Murphy	University of Limerick	0-21	21	3	7.00

Top scorers in a single game

Rank	Player	Club	Tally	Total	Opposition
1	Aaron Gillane	Mary Immaculate College	1-15	18	Dublin Institute of Technology
1	Aaron Gillane	Mary Immaculate College	1-12	15	NUI Galway
2	Peter Duggan	Limerick Institute of Technology	1-11	14	Garda College
3	Evan Niland	NUI Galway	0-13	13	Mary Immaculate College
3	Evan Niland	NUI Galway	0-12	12	University College Dublin
3	Barry Murphy	University of Limerick	0-11	11	NUI Galway
4	Séamus Casey	Institute of Technology, Carlow	1-07	10	Limerick Institute of Technology
4	Eoghan Dunne	Dublin Institute of Technology	1-07	10	Mary Immaculate College
4	Fionn Ó Riain Broin	Trinity College	0-10	10	Garda College
4	James Bergin	DCU Dóchas Éireann	0-10	10	University College Cork

== Awards ==
Team of the Year

1. Eoghan Cahill
2. Niall O'Leary
3. Eddie Gunning
4. Thomas Grimes
5. Chris O'Leary
6. Paddy O'Loughlin
7. Chris Crummey
8. Conor Browne
9. Jarlath Mannion
10. Shane Kingston
11. Aaron Gillane
12. James Bergin
13. Evan Niland
14. Shane Conway^{HOTY}
15. Mark Kehoe
