= Lowney, West Virginia =

Lowney
- Unincorporated community
- Location within the state of West Virginia Lowney (the United States)
- Coordinates: 37°56′13″N 82°16′31″W
- Country: United States
- State: West Virginia
- County: Mingo
- Elevation: 787 ft (240 m)
- Time zone: UTC-5 (Eastern (EST))
  - Summer (DST): UTC-4 (EDT)
- GNIS ID: 1549801

Lowney is an unincorporated community in Mingo County, West Virginia, United States.
