= Jarlath Mannion =

Irish hurler

Personal information
- Native name: Iarlaith Ó Mainnín (Irish)
- Born: 1996 (age 29–30) Cappataggle, County Galway, Ireland
- Occupation: Quantity surveyor

Sport
- Sport: Hurling
- Position: Left corner-forward
Club
- Years: Club
- Cappataggle
Club titles
- Galway titles: 0
College
- Years: College
- 2015-2019: Galway-Mayo Institute of Technology
College titles
- Fitzgibbon titles: 0
Inter-county*
Years	County	Apps (scores)
2019-present	Galway	0 (0-00)
Inter-county titles
- Leinster titles: 0
- All-Irelands: 0
- NHL: 0
- All Stars: 0
- *Inter County team apps and scores correct as of 14:45, 12 July 2021.

Jarlath Mannion (born 1996) is an Irish hurler who plays for Galway Senior Championship club Cappataggle and at inter-county level with the Galway senior hurling team. He usually lines out at as a forward.

== Career ==
A member of the Cappataggle club, Mannion first came to prominence as a member of the club's 2014 Connacht Club Championship-winning team. He later lined out with the Galway-Mayo Institute of Technology and was man of the match when they won the Ryan Cup in 2019. Mannion first appeared at inter-county level as a member of the Galway minor team during the 2014 All-Ireland Minor Championship. After being omitted from the Galway under-21 team, he made his senior debut as part of Galway's 2019 Walsh Cup-winning team.

== Career statistics ==
As of match played 3 July 2021.

Team	Year	National League			Leinster		All-Ireland		Total	
Team	Year	Division	Apps	Score	Apps	Score	Apps	Score	Apps	Score
Galway	2019	Division 1B	2	0-00	0	0-00	—		2	0-00
Galway	2020	Division 1A	1	0-00	0	0-00	0	0-00	1	0-00
Galway	2021	Division 1A	4	1-04	0	0-00	0	0-00	4	1-04
Total			7	1-04	0	0-00	0	0-00	7	1-04

== Honours ==
Galway-Mayo Institute of Technology

- Ryan Cup: 2019

Cappataggle

- Connacht Intermediate Club Hurling Championship: 2014
- Galway Intermediate Hurling Championship: 2014

Galway

- Walsh Cup: 2019
