= 2018 Cork Senior Hurling Championship =

Annual hurling competition season

- Dates: 22 March – 14 October 2018
- Teams: 26
- Sponsor: Evening Echo
- Champions: Imokilly (4th title); Séamus Harnedy (captain); Fergus Condon (manager)
- Runners-up: Midleton; Luke O'Farrell (captain); Paddy Fitzgerald (manager)

Tournament statistics
- Matches played: 37
- Goals scored: 110 (2.97 per match)
- Points scored: 1173 (31.7 per match)
- Top scorer(s): Conor Lehane (2-37)

The 2018 Cork Senior Hurling Championship was the 130th staging of the Cork Senior Hurling Championship since its establishment by the Cork County Board in 1887. The draw for the 2018 opening fixtures took place on 10 December 2017. The championship began on 22 March 2018 and ended on 14 October 2018.

Imokilly were the defending champions.

On 14 October 2018, Imokilly won the championship after a 4–19 to 1–18 defeat of Midleton in the final at Páirc Uí Chaoimh. It was their fourth championship title overall and their second title in succession.

Midleton's Conor Lehane was the championship's top scorer with 2-37.

== Team changes ==
=== To Championship ===
Promoted from the Cork Premier Intermediate Hurling Championship

- Kanturk

=== From Championship ===
Relegated to the Cork Premier Intermediate Hurling Championship

- Youghal

== Championship details ==
=== Overview ===
The 2018 championship saw a total of 26 teams compete for the title. These consisted of 18 club teams, 6 divisional teams and 2 college teams. Kanturk made their debut in the senior championship while they were also the first club from the Duhallow Division to play in the senior championship.

=== Format ===
A new format was used for the 2018 championship. For the first time since 2015, the divisions and colleges competed in their own mini championship before entering the championship proper.

==== Divisional and college section ====
Round 1: Eight teams contested this round. The four winning teams advanced to Round 2. The four losing teams were eliminated from the championship.

Round 2: Four teams contested this round. The two winning teams advanced to Round 3 of the championship proper. The two losing teams were eliminated from the championship.

==== Club section ====
Round 1: 18 teams contested this round. The nine losing teams advanced to Round 2. The nine winning teams advanced to Round 3.

Round 2: The 9 losing teams from Round 1 contested this round. The four winning teams advanced to Round 3. The four losing teams were eliminated from the championship. One team received a bye to Round 3.

Round 3: The 9 winning teams from Round 1, the 4 winning teams from Round 2, the bye team and the 2 divisional teams contested this round. The 8 winning teams advanced to the Quarter-finals. The 8 losing teams were eliminated from the championship.

Quarter-finals: 8 teams contested this round. The 4 winning teams advanced to the Semi-finals. The 4 losing teams were eliminated from the championship.

Semi-finals: 4 teams contested this round. The 2 winning teams advanced to the Semi-finals. The 2 losing teams were eliminated from the championship.

Final: The final was contested by the two semi-final winners.

== Results ==
=== Divisions/colleges section ===
22 March 2018 Round 1	University College Cork	1-21 - 0-10	Carrigdhoun	Páirc Uí Rinn, Cork
19:45	D Fitzgibbon 0-7, M Coleman 1-3, C Roche 0-3, T Devine 0-3, D Griffin 0-1, S O'Donoghue 0-1, N Montgomery 0-1, C Terry 0-1, D Holmes 0-1.		R O'Shea 0-2, S Coleman 0-2, C Tyers 0-2, D Looney 0-1, D Drake 0-1, L O'Callaghan 0-1, M Kennefick 0-1.	Referee: J Larkin (Ballinora)

22 March 2018 Round 1	Cork Institute of Technology	4-18 - 3-07	Carbery	Cloughduv
19:45	T O'Connor 0-6, E O'Shea 1-2, N Fives 1-0, P Collins 1-0, E Barry 1-0, E Heffernan 0-3, J Good 0-2, D Fanning 0-1, K Cashman 0-1, J Cooper 0-1.		P Wall 2-0, K Coffey 1-2, D Coakley 0-2, J O'Sullivan 0-1, K O'Donovan 0-1, T Harrington 0-1.	Referee: N Wall (Carrigaline)

22 March 2018 Round 1	Duhallow	1-10 - 1-18	Avondhu	O'Connell Park, Glantane
19:45	S Crowley 1-0, S Howard 0-3, B O'Connor 0-3, D Hannon 0-2, K Tarrant 0-1, G Linehan 0-1.		H O'Gorman 0-6, B Murphy 1-2, S Condon 0-3, K Morrison 0-3, E Dillon 0-1, N McNamara 0-1, B Buckley 0-1, W Condon 0-1.	Referee: M Maher (St. Finbarr's)

27 March 2018 Round 1	Imokilly	5-22 - 0-19	Muskerry	Páirc Uí Rinn, Cork
	B Mulcahy 2-3, D Mangan 1-3, S Hegarty 1-2, P O'Sullivan 1-2, S Harnedy 0-5, D Dalton 0-3, B Lawton 0-2, T Greaney 0-1, B Cooper 0-1.		K Hallissey 0-11, S Bourke 0-4, S Cronin 0-2, M O'Riordan 0-1, S Walsh 0-1.	Referee: S Stokes (Tullylease)

29 March 2018 Round 2	University College Cork	3-20 - 0-09	Avondhu	Páirc Uí Rinn, Cork
	D Fitzgibbon 1-2, S Conway 0-5, M O'Brien 0-5, T Devine 1-1, N Montgomery 0-4, D Holmes 1-0, E Clifford 0-1, S O'Donoghue 0-1, C Terry 0-1.		N McManus 0-3, H O'Gorman 0-2, D O'Flynn 0-1, W Condon 0-1, J Twomey 0-1, D Buckley 0-1.	Referee: C McAllister (Aghada)

2 April 2018 Round 2	Cork Institute of Technology	0-11 - 5-14	Imokilly	Páirc Uí Rinn, Cork
	M Kearney 0-4, J O'Neill 0-2, P Collins 0-1, D Hartnett 0-1, E O'Shea 0-1, E Barry 0-1, B Hyland 0-1.		B Mulcahy 2-1, P O'Sullivan 2-1, D Dalton 0-7, S Harnedy 1-2, J Cronin 0-2, B Lawton 0-1.	Referee: D Kirwan (Éire Óg)

=== Round 1 ===
22 April 2018 Round 1	Erin's Own	4-21 - 2-13	Bride Rovers	Páirc Uí Rinn, Cork
	E Murphy 0-12, M O'Carroll 3-1, M Collins 0-5, R O'Flynn 1-1, S Cronin 0-1, K Murphy 0-1.		B Johnson 1-4, W Finnegan 0-5, B Roche 1-1, C O'Connor 0-1, C Ryan 0-1, M Collins 0-1.	Referee: D Copps (Ballyhea)

27 April 2018 Round 1	Killeagh	1-09 - 3-19	Douglas	Páirc Uí Rinn, Cork
	B Delaney 1-0, E Keniry 0-3, B Collins 0-2, K Lane 0-2, G Leahy 0-1, D Walsh 0-1.		S Kingston 1-4, M O'Connor 1-4, C McCarthy 1-3, S Bourke 0-4, L McGrath 0-2, M Collins 0-1, D Murphy 0-1.

28 April 2018 Round 1	Ballymartle	1-09 - 4-20	Glen Rovers	Páirc Uí Rinn, Cork
	J Dwyer 1-2, B Corry 0-3, S O'Mahony 0-2, B Dwyer 0-2.		P Horgan 1-10, S Kennefick 1-3, D Noonan 1-1, D Brosnan 1-1, E Cronin 0-3, A O'Donovan 0-1, G Kennefick 0-1.	Referee: J Larkin (Ballinora)

28 April 2018 Round 1	Newtownshandrum	2-14 - 0-15	Kanturk	Mannix Park, Charleville
	J Coughlan 2-7, T O'Mahony 0-2, S Griffin 0-1, R Clifford 0-1, D Stack 0-1, M Ryan 0-1, M Thompson 0-1.		L O'Keeffe 0-8, I Walsh 0-3, A Walsh 0-2, L McLoughlin 0-1, J Fitzpatrick 0-1.	Referee: P O'Driscoll (Bride Rovers)

29 April 2018 Round 1	Midleton	0-19 - 0-12	Bishopstown	Páirc Uí Rinn, Cork
	C Lehane 0-6, C Walsh 0-4, P Nagle 0-3, P Haughney 0-1, S O'Meara 0-1, C Beausang 0-1, L O'Farrell 0-1, P O'Farrell 0-1, P White 0-1.		T Murray 0-4, C Walsh 0-2, K O'Halloran 0-1, C Hegarty 0-1, D Sexton 0-1, B Murray 0-1, M Power 0-1, P Cronin 0-1.	Referee: N Wall (Carrigaline)

29 April 2018 Round 1	Sarsfields	1-19 - 1-13	Ballyhea	Páirc Mac Gearailt
	A Myers 0-7, J O'Connor 1-2, D Kearney 0-4, T Óg Murphy 0-2, J Sweeney 0-1, L Hacket 0-1, D Roche 0-1, W Kearney 0-1.		P O'Callaghan 0-5, E O'Leary 1-1, M O'Sullivan 0-3, J Morrissey 0-3, G Morrissey 0-1.	Referee: J Larkin (Ballinora)

29 April 2018 Round 1	Carrigtwohill	1-12 - 1-19	Blackrock	Páirc Uí Rinn, Cork
	L Gosnell 0-11, S Devlin 1-0, T Hogan 0-1.		A O'Callaghan 0-7, D Meaney 1-2, K O'Keeffe 0-3, E Smith 0-1, D O'Farrell 0-1, S Murphy 0-1, G Regan 0-1, T Deasy 0-1, M O'Keeffe 0-1, J O'Sullivan 0-1.	Referee: S Stokes (Tullylease)

29 April 2018 Round 1	Na Piarsaigh	0-15 - 2-15	Bandon	Brinny Sportfield, Brinny
	P Guest 0-5, D Connery 0-4, E Sheehan 0-2, K Forde 0-2, S Forde 0-1, G Joyce 0-1.		M Sugrue 1-3, R Crowley 0-4, M Cahalane 1-0, D Crowley 0-3, E O'Donovan 0-2, P Barry 0-1, A Murphy 0-1, J Hickey 0-1.	Referee: C McAllister (Aghada)

29 April 2018 Round 1	Newcestown	1-13 - 0-14	St. Finbarr's	Páirc Liam Mhic Cárthaigh, Ballygarvan
	T Horgan 1-2, E Kelly 0-5, D Twomey 0-3, T Twomey 0-2, C Keane 0-1.		I Lordan 0-7, C Keane 0-2, F Finn 0-2, C Walsh 0-1, C Barrett 0-1, R O'Mahony 0-1.	Referee: D Kirwan (Éire Óg)

=== Round 2 ===
11 August 2018 Round 2	Bishopstown	1-19 - 1-12	Kanturk	Cloughduv
	P Cronin 0-5, M Power 1-1, T Murray 0-4, C Hegarty 0-3, C O'Driscoll 0-2, P Honohan 0-2, K O'Halloran 0-1, E McCarthy 0-1.		L O'Keeffe 1-3, L O'Neill 0-4, A O'Keeffe 0-2, R Walsh 0-1, I Walsh 0-1, D O'Connell 0-1.	Referee: C McAllister (Aghada)

12 August 2018 Round 2	Killeagh	2-13 - 2-15	St. Finbarr's	Clonmult Memorial Park, Midleton
	D Walsh 2-0, E Keniry 0-5, K Treacy 0-2, G Leahy 0-2, K Murphy 0-2, K Lane 0-1, A Walsh 0-1.		I Lordan 0-6, R O'Mahony 1-1, B Hennessy 1-0 C Barrett 0-2, D Cahalane 0-1, C Cahalane 0-1, G O'Connor 0-1, E Keane 0-1, C Keane 0-1, C Walsh 0-1.	Referee: S Stokes (Tullylease)

12 August 2018 Round 2	Ballyhea	0-20 - 5-13	Ballymartle	Mallow GAA Complex, Mallow
	P O'Callaghan 0-10, M O'Sullivan 0-6, C Cox 0-1, E O'Leary 0-1, J Copps 0-1, C Hanley 0-1.		B O'Dwyer 1-6, B Corry 1-5, Jamie O'Dwyer 1-1, Jack Dwyer 1-1, D McCarthy 1-0.	Referee: D Kirwan (Éire Óg)

12 August 2018 Round 2	Bride Rovers	2-24 - 0-17	Na Piarsaigh	Clonmult Memorial Park, Midleton
	D Dooley 0-7, B Johnson 0-6, E Ó hEochaidh 1-2, B Roche 0-5, S O'Connor 1-0, C O'Connor 0-3, M Collins 0-1.		E Sheehan 0-9, P Rourke 0-3, D Lee 0-2, C Joyce 0-1, G Joyce 0-1, K Forde 0-1.	Referee: N Wall (Carrigaline)

=== Round 3 ===
31 August 2018 Round 3	Sarsfields	2-17 - 0-08	Carrigtwohill	St. Catherine's Park, Ballynoe
	L Hackett 1-3, E O'Sullivan 0-4, D Kearney 0-4, J Sweeney 1-0, W Kearney 0-1, D Roche 0-1, J O'Connor 0-1, C Darcy 0-1, A Myers 0-1, T Óg Murphy 0-1.		L Gosnell 0-4, S Rohan 0-2, B Twomey 0-1, S Roche 0-1.	Referee: C McAllister (Aghada)

1 September 2018 Round 3	St. Finbarr's	1-18 - 0-20	Douglas	Páirc Uí Chaoimh, Cork
	R O'Mahony 1-3, I Lordan 0-4, C Cahalane 0-3, E Finn 0-3, C Walsh 0-1, C Dennehy 0-1, J Goggin 0-1, C Keane 0-1, B Hennessy 0-1.		A Cadogan 0-6, C McCarthy 0-5, S Kingston 0-4, B Turnbull 0-2, M Collins 0-1, D Murphy 0-1, E Cadogan 0-1.	Referee: N Wall (Carrigaline)

1 September 2018 Round 3	Midleton	1-18 - 0-20	Glen Rovers	Páirc Uí Chaoimh, Cork
	C Lehane 1-10, C Beausang 0-3, J Nagle 0-1, C Walsh 0-1, P Haughney 0-1, S O'Meara 0-1, S O'Leary-Hayes 0-1.		P Horgan 0-12, S Kennefick 0-2, M Dooley 0-2, D Noonan 0-1, D Cronin 0-1, R Downey 0-1, C Dorris 0-1.	Referee: D Kirwan (Éire Óg)

1 September 2018 Round 3	Bandon	2-08 - 4-13	Newcestown	Ahamilla Pitch, Clonakilty
	M Cahalane 1-4, E O'Donovan 1-0, A Murphy 0-2, M Sugrue 0-1.		D Twomey 2-2, T Horgan 1-1, S Ryan 1-0, E Kelly 0-3, C Dinneen 0-2, L Meade 0-1, C Keane 0-1.	Referee: J Larkin (Ballinora)

1 September 2018 Round 3	University College Cork	0-23 - 2-16	Erin's Own	Riverstown
	S Conway 0-10, C Terry 0-4, N Montgomery 0-3, A Casey 0-3, C Roche 0-3,		E Murphy 1-11, A Bowen 1-0, R O'Flynn 0-2, M O'Carroll 0-2, S Murphy 0-1.	Referee: C Dineen (Douglas)

1 September 2018 Round 3	Bride Rovers	0-20 - 3-18	Newtownshandrum	Castletownroche Sportsfield, C'roche
	C O'Connor 0-9, D Dooley 0-3, C Ryan 0-2, J Pratt 0-2, S O'Connor 0-1, B Johnston 0-1, M Collins 0-1, B Roche 0-1.		J Coughlan 0-10, T O'Mahony 2-1, R Clifford 1-1, M Ryan 0-3, K O'Sullivan 0-1, S Griffin 0-1, J Geary 0-1.	Referee: M Maher (St. Finbarr's)

2 September 2018 Round 3	Imokilly	1-21 - 1-10	Bishopstown	Riverstown
	W Leahy 0-8, D Mangan 1-1, B Cooper 0-3, M O'Keeffe 0-3, Barry Lawton 0-2, J Cronin 0-1, B Lawton 0-1, P O'Sullivan 0-1, B Mulcahy 0-1.		P Cronin 0-7, D Crowley 1-0, C Hegarty 0-2, T Murphy 0-1.	Referee: S Stokes (Tullylease)

9 September 2018 Round 3	Blackrock	0-22 - 1-14	Ballymartle	Páirc Uí Rinn, Cork
	M O'Halloran 0-8, T Deasy 0-5, D Meaney 0-3, S Murphy 0-2, D O'Farrell 0-1, A O'Callaghan 0-1, J O'Sullivan 0-1, N Cashman 0-1.		B Dwyer 0-5, P Dwyer 1-0, D McCarthy 0-2, J Dwyer 0-2, S Corry 0-2, S O'Mahony 0-2, B Corry 0-1.	Referee: C McAllister (Aghada)

=== Relegation play-offs ===
15 September 2018 Round 1	Killeagh	2-13 - 3-19	Ballyhea	Páirc Mac Gearailt, Fermoy
	E Keniry 0-10, A Walsh 1-1, D Walsh 1-1, K Treacy 0-1.		P O'Callaghan 0-11, M O'Sullivan 2-1, E O'Leary 1-2, D Copps 0-2, T Hanley 0-1, J Morrissey 0-1, L O'Connor 0-1.	Referee: C Dineen (Douglas)

22 September 2018 Round 2	Carrigtwohill	1-16 - 3-11	Na Piarsaigh	Páirc Uí Chonaill, Cobh
	L Gosnell 1-7, S Rohan 0-2, B Twomey 0-2, P Hogan 0-1, L O'Sullivan 0-1, S Roche 0-1, T Hogan 0-1, S Dempsey 0-1.		E Sheehan 0-6, S Forde 1-0, K Buckley 1-0, P Guest 1-0, C Joyce 0-2, P Rourke 0-1, D Connery 0-1, A Hogan 0-1.	Referee: N Wall (Carrigaline)

30 September 2018 Round 2	Killeagh	0-09 - 0-16	Kanturk	Páirc Mac Gearailt, Fermoy
	E Keniry 0-5, G Leary 0-2, K Treacy 0-1, M Murphy 0-1.		A Walsh 0-3, L O'Keeffe 0-3, R Walsh 0-2, D O'Connell 0-2, J Fitzpatrick 0-2, L McLoughlin 0-2, I Walsh 0-1, L O'Neill 0-1.	Referee: D Copps (Ballyhea)

=== Quarter-finals ===
15 September 2018 Quarter-final	Blackrock	1-20 - 1-11	St. Finbarr's	Páirc Uí Chaoimh, Cork
	M O'Halloran 0-7, T Deasy 1-1, K O'Keeffe 0-4, A O'Callaghan 0-3, G Regan 0-2, D O'Farrell 0-1, S Murphy 0-1, J O'Sullivan 0-1.		C Cahalane 1-0, E Finn 0-3, B Beckett 0-3, I Lordan 0-1, P Kelleher 0-1, C Dennehy 0-1, D Scannell 0-1, C Keane 0-1.	Referee: C McAllister (Aghada)

15 September 2018 Quarter-final	Newtownshandrum	2-15 - 1-19	Midleton	Páirc Uí Chaoimh, Cork
	J Coughlan 0-11, T O'Mahony 1-0, D Stack 1-0, S Griffin 0-2, M Ryan 0-1, R Clifford 0-1.		C Lehane 0-8, C Beausang 1-4, L O'Farrell 0-4, P Haughney 0-1, P White 0-1, T O'Connell 0-1.	Referee: N Wall (Carrigaline)

16 September 2018 Quarter-final	Imokilly	1-22 - 2-18	Newcestown	Páirc Uí Rinn[, Cork
	W Leahy 0-10, P O'Sullivan 1-2, S Harnedy 0-3, C O'Brien 0-2, D Mangan 0-2, D O'Callaghan 0-1, J Cronin 0-1, S Hegarty 0-1.		D Twomey 0-8, T Horgan 1-1, S O'Donovan 1-0, J Meade 0-3, L Meade 0-2, E Kelly 0-2, T Horgan 0-1, C Keane 0-1.	Referee: D Kirwan (Éire Óg)

16 September 2018 Quarter-final	Sarsfields	1-14 - 0-20	University College Cork	Páirc Uí Rinn[, Cork
	D Kearney 1-4, E O'Sullivan 0-6, J O'Connor 0-2, J Sweeney 0-2.		S Conway 0-10, D Fitzgibbon 0-3, A Casey 0-2, D Moynihan 0-1, M Coleman 0-1, C Roche 0-1, C Terry 0-1, T Devine 0-1.	Referee: M Maher (St. Finbarr's)

=== Semi-finals ===
30 September 2018 Semi-final	Imokilly	3-21 - 1-15	University College Cork	Páirc Uí Chaoimh, Cork
	W Leahy 0-7, P O'Sullivan 1-2, S Harnedy 1-2, M O'Keeffe 0-5, S Hegarty 1-1, Barry Lawton 0-3, Brian Lawton 0-1.		S Conway 1-4, M Breen 0-5, M Coleman 0-4, A Casey 0-2.	Referee: N Wall (Carrigaline)

30 September 2018 Semi-final	Blackrock	3-11 - 2-16	Midleton	Páirc Uí Chaoimh, Cork
	M O'Halloran 2-4, T Deasy 1-1, D O'Farrell 0-2, S Murphy 0-1, G Regan 0-1, K O'Keeffe 0-1, J O'Sullivan 0-1.		C Lehane 1-6, L O'Farrell 1-1, C Beausang 0-3, P Haughney 0-3, P White 0-1, S O'Meara 0-1, T O'Connell 0-1.	Referee: J Larkin (Ballinora)

=== Final ===
14 October 2018 Final	Imokilly	4-19 - 1-18	Midleton	Páirc Uí Chaoimh, Cork
	S Harnedy (1-6); P O’Sullivan (2-1); W Leahy (0-5, 0-2 frees, 0-1’ 65); B Cooper (0-4); S Hegarty (1-1); D Dalton, Barry Lawton (0-1 each).	Report	C Lehane (0-7, 0-6 frees); C Walsh (0-4); P White (1-1); L O’Farrell (0-3); C Beausang, P Haughney S O’Meara (0-1 each).	Attendance: 10,214; Referee: D Kirwan (Éire Óg)

== Championship statistics ==
=== Top scorers ===
Overall

Rank	Player	Club	Tally	Total	Matches	Average
1	Conor Lehane	Midleton	2-37	43	5	8.60
2	Jamie Coughlan	Newtownshandrum	2-28	34	3	11.33
3	Shane Conway	UCC	1-29	32	4	8.00
4	Paudie O'Sullivan	Imokilly	7-09	30	4	7.50
4	William Leahy	Imokilly	0-30	30	4	7.50
6	Séamus Harnedy	Imokilly	3-18	27	5	5.40
7	Eoghan Murphy	Erin's Own	1-23	26	2	13.00
7	Pa O'Callaghan	Ballyhea	0-26	26	3	8.66
9	Patrick Horgan	Glen Rovers	1-22	25	2	12.50
9	Liam Gosnell	Carrigtwohill	1-22	25	3	8.33

Top scorers in a single game

Rank	Player	Club	Tally	Total	Opposition
1	Eoghan Murphy	Erin's Own	1-11	14	UCC
2	Jamie Coughlan	Newtownshandrum	2-07	13	Kanturk
2	Patrick Horgan	Glen Rovers	1-10	13	Ballymartle
2	Conor Lehane	Midleton	1-10	13	Glen Rovers
5	Eoghan Murphy	Erin's Own	0-12	12	Bride Rovers
5	Patrick Horgan	Glen Rovers	0-12	12	Midleton
7	Jamie Coughlan	Newtownshandrum	0-11	11	Midleton
7	Kevin Hallissey	Muskerry	0-11	11	Imokilly
7	Pa O'Callaghan	Ballyhea	0-11	11	Killeagh
10	Maurice O'Carroll	Erin's Own	3-01	10	Bride Rovers
10	Michael O'Halloran	Blackrock	2-04	10	Midleton
10	Liam Gosnell	Carrigtwohill	1-07	10	Na Piarsaigh
10	Pa O'Callaghan	Ballyhea	0-10	10	Ballymartle
10	Jamie Coughlan	Newtownshandrum	0-10	10	Bride Rovers
10	Eoghan Keniry	Midleton	0-10	10	Ballyhea
10	William Leahy	Imokilly	0-10	10	Newcestown
10	Shane Conway	UCC	0-10	10	Sarsfields

=== Scoring ===
- Widest winning margin: 20 points
  - University College Cork 3-20 - 0-09 Avondhu (29 March 2018)
  - Glen Rovers 4-20 - 1-09 Ballymartle (28 April 2018)
- Most goals in a match: 7
  - Cork Institute of Technology 4-18 - 3-07 Carbery (22 March 2018)

=== Miscellaneous ===
- The divisions and colleges section game between Avondhu and Duhallow was the first senior championship match to be played at Kilshannig's home ground, O'Connell Park.
- On 29 April 2018, the double-header of round 1 games at Páirc Uí Rinn were broadcast as part of GAA Beo on TG4. It was the first time that games from the earlier rounds of the championship were broadcast live on national television.
- Kanturk become the first club from the Duhallow division to play in the senior championship.

== Team of the Year ==
The All-Star Team of the Year was announced on 5 December 2018.

Pos.	Player	Team
GK	Tommy Wallace	Midleton
RCB	Gary Norberg	Blackrock
FB	Colm Spillane	Imokilly
LCB	Séadnaidh Smyth	Midleton
RWB	Ciarán O'Brien	Imokilly
CB	Niall O'Leary	Imokilly
LWB	Mark Coleman	UCC
MD	Bill Cooper^{HOTY}	Imokilly
MD	Mark O'Keeffe	Imokilly
RWF	Luke O'Farrell	Midleton
CF	Séamus Harnedy	Imokilly
LWF	Daniel Kearney	Sarsfields
RCF	Will Leahy	Imokilly
FF	Conor Lehane	Midleton
LCF	Paudie O'Sullivan	Imokilly
