= Institute of Technology, Carlow =

Former higher educational institution

Coordinates: 52.8277°N 6.9358°W

- Institiúid Teicneolaíochta Cheatharlach
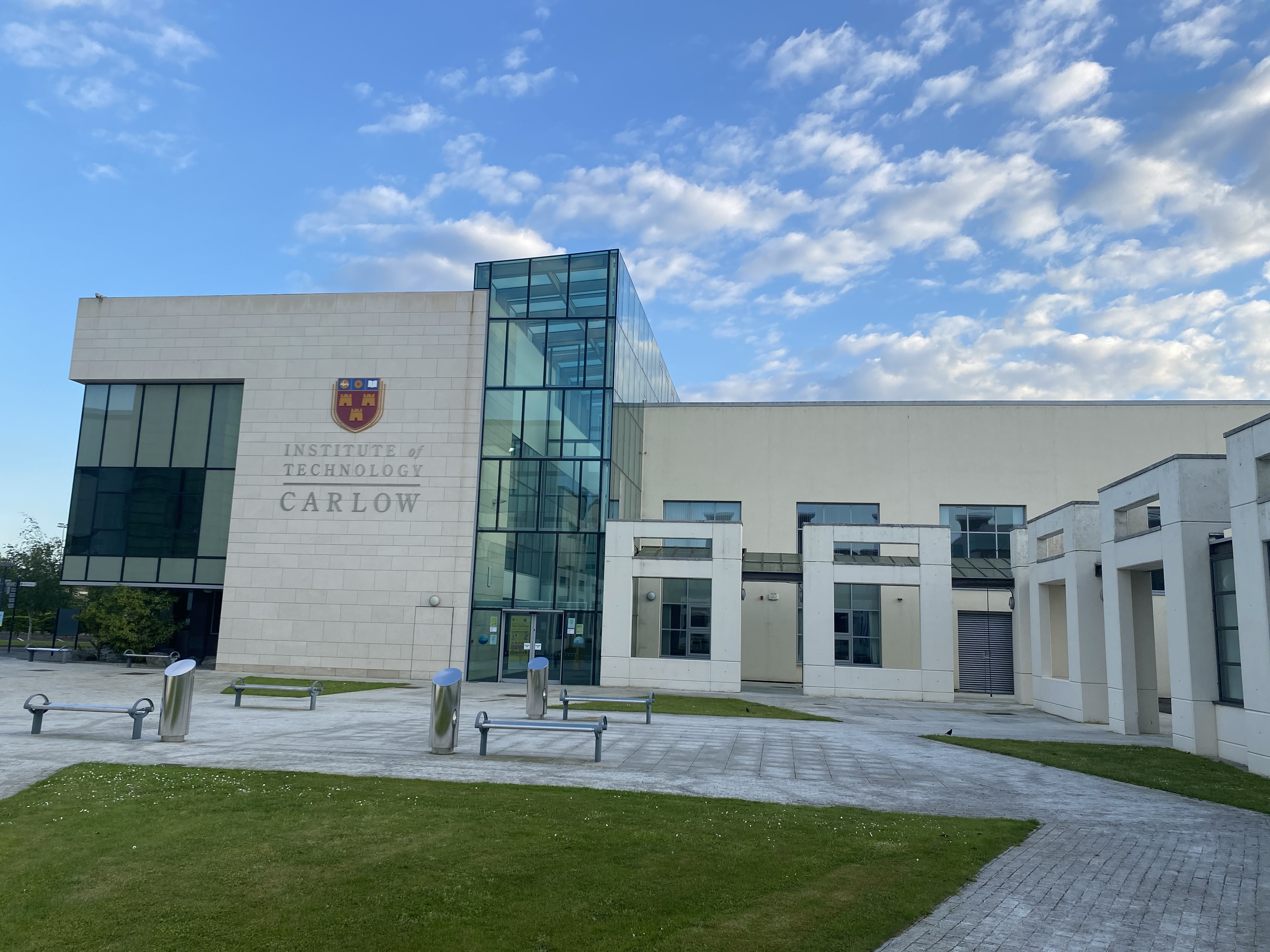
- Carlow campus in June 2021
- Type: Public
- Active: 1970–1 May 2022
- President: Dr Patricia Mulcahy
- Students: 10,650
- Location: Kilkenny Road, Carlow, Leinster, R93 V960, Ireland
- Website: www.itcarlow.ie

The Institute of Technology, Carlow (IT Carlow; Irish: Institiúid Teicneolaíochta Cheatharlach) was an institute of technology, located in Carlow, Ireland. The institute had campuses in Carlow, Wexford, and Wicklow, as well as a part-time provision elsewhere in Ireland. Along with the Waterford Institute of Technology, the institute was dissolved on 1 May 2022 and was succeeded by the South East Technological University.

== Administration ==
Dr Patricia Mulcahy was appointed president of the college in 2012, succeeding Dr Ruaidhrí Neavyn who became president of WIT. John Gallagher served as the first Principal of Carlow RTC and subsequently held the post of director of the IT Carlow.

== Recognition ==
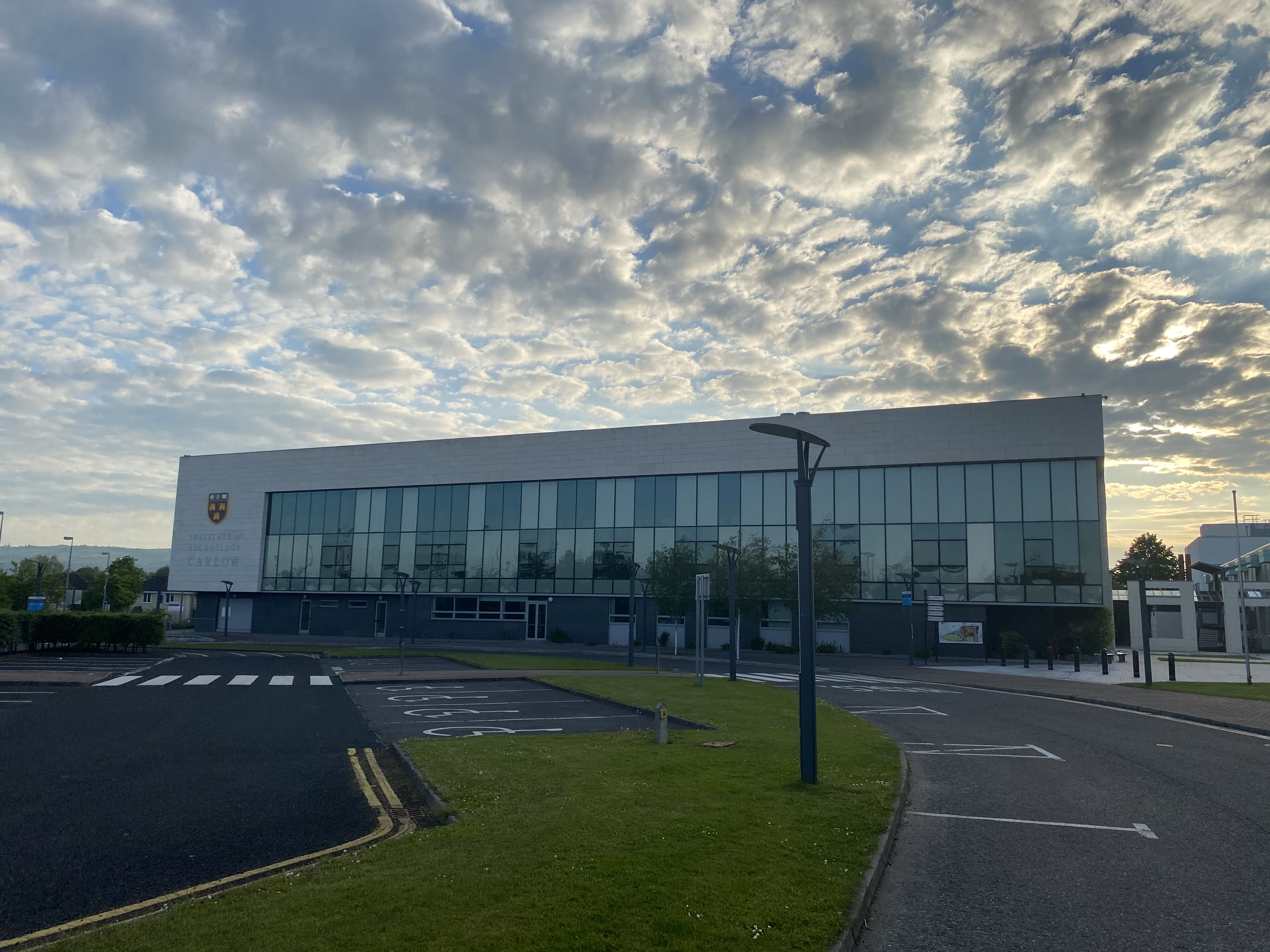
IT Carlow, Carlow campus

Institute of Technology Carlow had ranked as the second-largest of Ireland's 14 Institutes of Technology with more than 8,448 enrolments and 851 staff, and has generated over 55,000 graduates since its founding in 1970. Institute of Technology Carlow provides higher educational programmes, and research and enterprise development opportunities, through its centres in Carlow, Wexford, and Wicklow; the institute offers more than 80 taught programmes to Level 9 on the National Framework of Qualifications (NFQ). Institute of Technology Carlow has the highest percentage of full-time postgraduates in the technological sector, the highest undergraduate progression rate at Level 8 in the higher education sector and the highest percentage of Lifelong Learners in the sector.

The presence of the institute was a consideration in the decision of UNUM (strategic software services centre, 2008) and Merck Sharp & Dohme (human vaccines and biologics, 2007) to locate in Carlow.

In 2014, IT Carlow was named the Sunday Times Institute of Technology of the Year.

== Courses ==
IT Carlow provides higher educational full-time courses, along with research and enterprise development opportunities, through its centres in Carlow and Wexford. The institute also provides part-time courses in Carlow, Wexford, Wicklow and Dublin.

In addition, IT Carlow has educational and research partnerships and collaborations with national and international industries and higher educational institutions in Europe.

=== Third-level courses ===
IT Carlow has a portfolio of almost 100 Masters, Honours & Ordinary Degree and Higher Certificate courses delivered by 9 different departments and campuses.

In addition to its traditional degree courses, IT Carlow also provides niche courses. The institute was awarded the Aviation Academic Education Award at the Irish Aviation Industry Awards in 2015. In 2015, IT Carlow launched its €5.5million Centre for Aerospace Engineering, comprising an avionics workshop and fleet of aircraft inside its own hangar. It Carlow offers degree courses in aerospace engineering and pilot studies, while its BEng in Aircraft Systems is the only one of its kind in Ireland.

IT Carlow's degree courses in Sport & Exercise, delivered in partnership with the Football Association of Ireland (FAI), Irish Rugby Football Union (IRFU) and Leinster Rugby Club. Other sports degree and masters courses include Sports Rehabilitation and Athletic Therapy, Strength & Conditioning and Sports Management & Coaching.

=== Learner profile ===
With a student population of 7,000 (2015/16), IT Carlow has a portfolio of over 80 taught courses to Level 8 on the NFQ, seven taught courses to Level 9 on the NFQ, a research portfolio to Doctoral level (Level 10 NFQ) in the Sciences and Technology, and a research platform in the Arts, Humanities and Social Sciences.

Having trained almost 45,000 graduates to date, IT Carlow's current student population comprises leaving certificate entrants, a European and international student body, an increasing proportion of mature students and learners from disadvantaged backgrounds, as well as a number of part-time learners (approximately 33% of the total IT Carlow WTE).

=== Research, Development and Innovation (RDI) ===
Research, Development and Innovation (RDI) programmes at IT Carlow had been variously funded by the Department of Agriculture Ireland, the European INTERREG Programme, the Higher Education Authority (HEA) PRTLI, the HEA Strategic Innovation Fund (SIF), EU Framework Programmes, Industry, the Environmental Protection Agency (EPA), Irish Research Council for Science Engineering & Technology (IRCSET), the Technological Sector Research Programme (TSR, Department of Education and Science Ireland), Enterprise Ireland and Science Foundation Ireland. The institute has a strategic collaborative relationship with Teagasc Oak Park Research Centre Carlow.

The institute's RDI activities are supported by various campus-based specialist centres and campus companies, which include the Campus Innovation Centre and the Enterprise & Research Incubation Centre and, in particular, its research facility, the Dargan Centre. It is home to the following research areas:

- Bioenvironmental technologies (enviroCORE);
- Product design and innovation (designCORE);
- Interactive applications software and networks (gameCORE);
- Health sciences, including Europe's only dedicated Men's Health Research Centre.
- Humanities (socialCORE)

=== Partnerships and internationalisation ===
IT Carlow's work with other organisations had included:

- The joint delivery of programmes with the Defence Forces in Leadership, Management, Engineering and Computing up to and including Masters level.
- The BA in Sport and Exercise delivered by IT Carlow in co-operation with Leinster Rugby and Irish Rugby Football Union, the Football Association of Ireland and the Gaelic Athletic Association.
- IT Carlow and An Cosán collaboratively provide the BA in Leadership and Community Development in An Cosán facilities in Tallaght, Dublin.
- In February 2011 IT Carlow established the ICT Research centre in Burrell's Hall, St. Kierans College, Kilkenny, this is a partnership between Kilkenny County Council (Invest Kilkenny), and WIT(Telecommunications Software and Systems Group).

IT Carlow had educational and research partnerships with national and international industries and higher educational institutions in Europe. These have included:

- 76 European partner institutions (across 17 countries).
- The delivery of IT Carlow-accredited computing programmes in Henan University of Economics and Law, PR China.
- Other transnational collaborations which include dedicated feeder, progression or recognition arrangements, and exchange programmes with the following institutions: Guilin University of Electronic Technology, China; Louyang University of Finance & Economics, China; Dong-A University, South Korea; Chung-Ang University, South Korea; Inha University, South Korea; UTHM, Malaysia; Nilai University, Malaysia; UMP, Malaysia; Temasek Polytechnic, Singapore; St. Ambrose University, USA; Nova Scotia Community College, Canada; College of the North Atlantic, Newfoundland; University of Pristina, Kosovo; Université de La Rochelle, France; Makerere University, Uganda.

Non-national full-time students currently account for almost 10% of the institute's full-time student population, divided between EU and non-EU nationalities.

== Technological University for the South East ==
The institute has been planning a joint application with Waterford IT for the formation of a technological university for the south east region since the mid-2010s. A vision document, "Technological University for the South East" (TUSE) was published in 2015, and a memorandum of understanding was signed in 2017. At the launch of TU Dublin in July 2018, the Taoiseach expressed regret that this TUSE bid had not progressed sufficiently following the "Technological Universities Act 2018".

A formal application for TU status is expected in April 2021.

Approval was announced in November 2021, and the TU was formally established in May 2022.

== Alumni and staff ==
- Megan Campbell – Republic of Ireland women's football international player.
- John Meyler, lecturer involved in hurling
- Mark Wall, Labour Party TD
- Verona Murphy, Ceann Comhairle of Dáil Éireann

== See also ==
- Education in the Republic of Ireland
- Third-level education in the Republic of Ireland
- St. Patricks, Carlow College
