= List of Cork Premier Intermediate Hurling Championship winners =

This is a list of all teams and players who have won the Cork Premier Intermediate Hurling Championship since its inception in 2004.

== By team ==
#	Team	Wins	Winning Years
1	Ballinhassig	3	2005, 2012, 2025
2	Courcey Rovers	2	2011, 2021
2	Blarney	2	2008, 2020
4	St. Catherine's	1	2004
4	Bishopstown	1	2006
4	Carrigtwohill	1	2007
4	Douglas	1	2009
4	Ballymartle	1	2010
4	Youghal	1	2013
4	Ballyhea	1	2014
4	Newcestown	1	2015
4	Bandon	1	2016
4	Kanturk	1	2017
4	Charleville	1	2018
4	Fr O'Neills	1	2019
4	Inniscarra	1	2022
4	Castlelyons	1	2023
4	Watergrasshill	1	2024

== By year ==
List of Cork Premier Intermediate Hurling Championship winners
Year	Team	Players	Ref
2004	St Catherine's	I O’Connell; A Keane, M Fitzgerald (c), A Hogan; S Fitzgerald, M O’Keeffe, P Cotter; S Kearney, J Sheehan; C Casey, K Morrison, P O’Connell; R O’Connell, D Walsh, M Hegarty. Subs. D Farrell; P O’Neill; B Hogan.	
2005	Ballinhassig	M Coleman (c); S McCarthy, D Healy, B Coleman; J Ahern, M Ahern, B O’Sullivan; D O’Sullivan, B Lombard; S Dineen, D Dineen, F O’Leary; D Duggan, J Mullaney, D O’Callaghan. Subs: P O’Sullivan; T Coleman.	
2006	Bishopstown	K O'Halloran, J O'Sullivan, M Cogan, P O'Donoghue, S O'Neill, D Crowley, C O'Driscoll, B Cuthbert, P Cronin, J Murphy, K Coughlan, R Conway (c), T Murray, M Hayes, M Power. Subs: D O'Mahony, T O'Donoghue.	
2007	Carrigtwohill	M Fitzgerald, M Nolan, JP O'Riordan, S Flannery, R Power, Séamus O'Farrell, M O'Riordan, F Flannery, J Barrett (c), S Dineen, N McCarthy, B Lordan, M Barry, Seánie O'Farrell, R White. Subs: S Barry.	
2008	Blarney	R Byrne, D Cronin (c), D McSweeney, P O'Leary, J Jordan, J Hughes, S O'Donoghue, B Hurley, E Hallahan, B Deasy, M McCarthy, J Hurley, M Cremin, R McNamara, C Murphy. Subs: E McCarthy, J O'Sullivan, D McCarthy.	
2009	Douglas	B Boyle, D McSweeney, A Barry, F Tobin (c), C Dineen, E Cadogan, R Keating, C O'Mahony, B Fitzgerald, M Collins, O Mulrooney, S Moylan, R Murphy, M Harrington, J Moylan. Subs: T Cullinane.	
2010	Ballymartle	Declan McCarthy, D Coleman, M Tobin, D Dwyer, N Sheehan, P Dwyer (c), D Edmonds, Darren McCarthy, S Corry, B Dwyer, B Corry, R Dwyer, J Dwyer, P Coughlan, D Dwyer. Subs: B Coleman, S O'Mahony.	
2011	Courcey Rovers	S Nyhan, D Duggan, T Lordan, Dan Lordan, O Gateley, V Hurley, B Hayes, D Murphy, David Hayes, Daire Lordan, S Lordan, S Hayes (c), K Moloney, N Murphy, C Lordan. Subs: J Murphy, S Holland, G Minihane.	
2012	Ballinhassig	M Coleman; Stephen McCarthy, E Finn, M Desmond; M Sheehan, M Aherne, B Lombard; B Coleman, Shane McCarthy; D Dineen (c), P Coomey, S Dineen; P O’Sullivan, F O’Leary, M Collins. Subs: D O’Donovan.	
2013	Youghal	R Cunningham; B O’Sullivan, J Grace, K Walsh; B Cooper (c), C Spillane, Barry Ring; N Roche, D Ring; J O’Mahony, A Frahill-O’Connor, O Dempsey; Brendan Ring, B Moloney, L Desmond. Subs: C O’Mahony, A Curtin.	
2014	Ballyhea	M Browne; M Morrissey, O O’Sullivan, A O’Connor; J Hennessy, B Coleman, T Shanahan; M O’Sullivan, D Copps; K Morrissey, N Ronan, P O’Callaghan; J Morrissey, G Morrissey, E O’Leary. Subs: E Morrissey, E Rea.	
2015	Newcestown	D Heffernan; M McSweeney, G Murphy, J Crowley; C O’Neill, J Desmond, F Keane; T Twomey, J Meade; L Meade, C Keane, C Twomey; S O’Donovan, E Kelly, D Twomey. Subs: M Bradfield, S Ryan, T Horgan, C Dineen.	
2016	Bandon	P Prendergast; P Murphy, J Walsh, E Ryan; P Crowley, D Lucey, J O’Donovan; E O’Donovan, C Dullea; D Crowley (c), J Hickey, C O’Mahony; M Sugrue, M Cahalane, R Crowley. Subs: A Murphy, R Fogarty, R Payne.	
2017	Kanturk	A Nash; P Walsh, J McLoughlin, E O’Connor; L O’Neill (c), D Browne, A Sheehy; L McLoughlin, R Walsh; J Browne, I Walsh, D Kenneally; A O’Keeffe, A Walsh, L O’Keeffe. Subs: M Healy, J Fitzpatrick, M O’Riordan.	
2018	Charleville	C Collins; D Butler, J Meade, F Cagney; A Dennehy, J Buckley, C Carroll; J O’Callaghan, K O’Connor; D Fitzgibbon, J Doyle, M Kavanagh; A Cagney, D O’Flynn (c), T Hawe. Subs: D Casey.	
2019	Fr O'Neill's	C Sloane; M Millerick, Adrian Kenneally, G Millerick; J Barry, D Harrington, T Millerick; J Millerick, K O’Sullivan; M O’Keeffe, R Cullinane, P McMahon; E Conway, D Dalton, B Dunne. Subs: J Hankard, P Butler, Adam Keneally, L O’Driscoll, C Broderick.	
2020	Blarney	P Hallissey; S Crowley (jc), P O’Leary, D Walsh; A McEvoy, P Philpott (jc), J Jordan; M Coleman, R Murphy; P Crowley, M O’Leary, D Hanlon; S Barrett, P Power, K Costello. Subs: S Mulcahy, C O’Mahony, C Murphy, B Ahern, B O’Connell.	
2021	Courcey Rovers	S Nyhan; B Mulcahy, B Collins, C Daly; D Coughlan, F Lordan, S McCarthy; DJ Twomey, M Collins; J O’Neill, T O’Sullivan, R Sweetnam; L Collins, S Twomey, R Nyhan. Subs: Aidan O’Donovan, C Roche, O Crowley, K Collins, J McCarthy.	
2022	Inniscarra	J O’Keeffe; D Keane, B O’Mahony, J O’Sullivan; A McCarthy, L Ryan, S Sheehan; J Enright, J Harrington; C Casey, S O’Donoghue, F O’Leary; D O’Keeffe, P Holland, O McCarthy (c). Subs: J O’Callaghan, K Rice.	
2023	Castlelyons	J Barry; L Sexton, N O’Leary, C Barry; C Spillane (c), D Spillane, J O’Leary; A Fenton, J Kearney; P Roche, L Doocey, C McCarthy; D Morrison, A Spillane, O Hallihan. Subs: B Murphy, K O’Leary, S Moroney.	
2024	Watergrasshill	A Foley; S Field, D McCarthy, D Roche; K O’Neill, D O’Leary, M O’Driscoll; S O’Regan, A Spriggs; C O’Leary, S Desmond, L Foley; B Lehane, A Murphy, P O’Leary. Subs: A Cronin, I O’Callaghan, P Cronin.	
2025	Ballinhassig	P Collins; C Kirby, K Maguire, P O’Leary; J O’Callaghan, D O’Sullivan, C Desmond; C Grainger, E Lombard; J Grainger, S McCarthy, S O’Neill; M Collins, F O’Leary, G Collins (c). Subs: J Lyne, E Cullinane, D O’Donovan, S Lombard, A O’Sullivan.	

== Individual records ==
Players who have won the most Cork PIHC titles
#	Player	Team	Years won				
#	Player	Team	Years won	3	Fintan O'Leary	Ballinhassig	2005, 2012, 2025
