= Billy Cooper =

Billy Cooper may refer to:

- Billy Cooper (footballer) (1917–?), English footballer
- Billy Cooper (Canadian football) (born 1945), Canadian football player
- Billy Cooper (trumpeter), cricket supporter and trumpet player for the Barmy Army
- Billy Cooper (activist), member of Patriot Platform

== See also ==
- Bill Cooper
- William Cooper
