= Rob O'Shea =

Irish hurler

Personal information
- Native name: Roibeard Ó Sé (Irish)
- Born: 20 July 1993 (age 33) Carrigaline, County Cork, Ireland
- Height: 5 ft 11 in (180 cm)

Sport
- Sport: Hurling
- Position: Midfield
Clubs
Years	Club	Apps (scores)
2010-present	Carrigaline; Carrigdhoun	52 (17-180)
Club titles
- Cork titles: 0
College
- Years: College
- University College Cork
College titles
- Fitzgibbon titles: 0
Inter-county*
Years	County	Apps (scores)
2013-2018	Cork	5 (1-01)
Inter-county titles
- Munster titles: 2
- All-Irelands: 0
- NHL: 0
- All Stars: 0
- *Inter County team apps and scores correct as of 18:17, 28 March 2019.

Robert O'Shea (born 20 July 1993) is an Irish hurler who plays as a midfielder for the Cork senior team.

Born in Carrigaline, County Cork, O'Shea first played competitive hurling and Gaelic football whilst a pupil at Carrigaline Community School. He arrived on the inter-county scene at the age of sixteen when he first linked up with the Cork minor team, before later lining out with the under-21 and intermediate sides. He made his senior debut in the 2013 Waterford Crystal Cup. O'Shea was later included on Cork's championship team as a substitute.

At club level O'Shea plays with Carrigaline.

== Career statistics ==
=== Club ===
As of 10 November 2024.

Team	Year	Cork PIHC	
Team	Year	Apps	Score
Carrigaline	2010	2	0-04
Carrigaline	2011	4	0-26
Carrigaline	2012	3	0-15
Carrigaline	2013	4	10-14
Carrigaline	2014	2	1-12
Carrigaline	2015	3	1-20
Carrigaline	2016	3	0-26
Carrigaline	2017	3	0-17
Carrigaline	2018	2	0-09
Carrigaline	2019	4	2-09
Carrigaline	2020	4	2-04
Carrigaline	2021	4	0-04
Carrigaline	2022	4	0-05
Carrigaline	2023	4	0-05
Carrigaline	2024	6	1-09
Career total		52	17-180

=== Inter-county ===
Team	Year	National League			Munster		All-Ireland		Total	
Team	Year	Division	Apps	Score	Apps	Score	Apps	Score	Apps	Score
Cork	2013	Division 1A	0	0-00	0	0-00	0	0-00	0	0-00
Cork	2014	Division 1B	6	0-01	1	0-01	1	1-00	8	1-02
Cork	2015	Division 1A	7	0-08	1	0-00	2	0-00	10	0-08
Cork	2016	Division 1A	—		—		—		—	
Cork	2017	Division 1A	—		—		—		—	
Cork	2018	Division 1A	1	0-00	0	0-00	0	0-00	1	0-00
Career total			14	0-09	2	0-01	3	1-00	19	1-10

== Honours ==
Carrigaline Community School

- Munster Colleges' Senior "C" Hurling Championship (1): 2011
- Cork Colleges' Senior Hurling Championship (2): 2011, 2012

University College Cork

- All-Ireland Freshers' Hurling Championship (1): 2013
