= Bill Cooper (hurler) =

Irish hurler

Personal information
- Native name: Liam Cúipéir (Irish)
- Born: 16 December 1987 (age 38) Youghal, County Cork, Ireland
- Occupation: Quantity surveyor
- Height: 6 ft 1 in (185 cm)

Sport
- Sport: Hurling
- Position: Midfield
Clubs
| Years | Club | Apps (scores) |
| 2008-present 2010-2011 2013 2018-present | Youghal → Imokilly → Cork IT → Imokilly | 13 (2-15); 5 (2-06); 2 (0-04); 13 (0-16) |
Club titles
- Cork titles: 3
College
- Years: College
- Cork Institute of Technology
Inter-county*
| Years | County | Apps (scores) |
| 2011-2021 | Cork | 30 (2-29) |
Inter-county titles
- Munster titles: 3
- All-Irelands: 0
- NHL: 0
- All Stars: 0
- *Inter County team apps and scores correct as of 23:41, 6 November 2020.

Bill Cooper (born 16 December 1987) is an Irish hurler who plays as a midfielder for club side Youghal, divisional side Imokilly and at inter-county level with the Cork senior hurling team.

== Playing career ==
=== Youghal ===
Cooper joined the Youghal club at a young age and played in all grades at juvenile and underage levels, enjoying championship success in under-13 and under-14 grades. His performances at club level saw him added to the Imokilly team in the senior championship in 2010. On 13 October 2013, Cooper was captain of the Youghal team that defeated Castlelyons by 0–11 to 0–10 in the premier intermediate championship final. He later won a Munster medal after scoring two points in Youghal's 2–13 to 2–10 defeat of Ballina.

=== Cork ===
==== Intermediate ====
Cooper first played for Cork at intermediate level on 30 May 2010 when he came on as a substitute in a Munster Championship quarter-final defeat of Tipperary. By the end of the provincial championship, Cooper had established himself as the team's first-choice centre-forward, winning a Munster medal after a two-point defeat of Waterford. On 28 August 2010, Cooper scored three points from play in Cork's 2–17 to 1–13 defeat by Kilkenny in the All-Ireland final.

==== Senior ====
Cooper made his senior debut for Cork on 27 March 2011, replacing Cian McCarthy for the final 4 minutes of a National League game against Tipperary at Páirc Uí Chaoimh. He made his first championship appearance in an All-Ireland Qualifier on 18 June 2011 and scored 1-03 from play in a 10–20 to 1–13 defeat of Laois. Cooper missed the following two seasons due to a disc problem in his back but returned to the panel after a 14-month layoff. On 13 July 2014, he won his first Munster medal after a six-point defeat of Limerick in the final.

Over the following seasons, Cooper established himself as a key member of Cork's starting fifteen. On 9 July 2017, he won his second Munster medal following a 1–25 to 1–20 defeat of Clare in the final.

On 1 July 2018, Cooper won a third Munster medal following a 2–24 to 3–19 defeat of Clare in the final.

== Career statistics ==
=== Club ===
As of match played 28 August 2020.

| Team | Year | Cork PIHC | | Munster | | All-Ireland | | Total | |
| Team | Year | Apps | Score | Apps | Score | Apps | Score | Apps | Score |
|---|---|---|---|---|---|---|---|---|---|
| Youghal | 2008 | 3 | 0-04 | — | | — | | 3 | 0-04 |
| Youghal | 2009 | 3 | 0-05 | — | | — | | 3 | 0-05 |
| Youghal | 2010 | 5 | 3-10 | — | | — | | 5 | 3-10 |
| Youghal | 2011 | 7 | 2-12 | — | | — | | 7 | 2-12 |
| Youghal | 2012 | — | | — | | — | | — | |
| Youghal | 2013 | 7 | 1-05 | 4 | 0-07 | 2 | 0-05 | 13 | 1-17 |
| Youghal | Total | 25 | 6-36 | 4 | 0-07 | 2 | 0-05 | 31 | 6-48 |
| Youghal | Year | Cork SHC | | Munster | | All-Ireland | | Total | |
| Youghal | Year | Apps | Score | Apps | Score | Apps | Score | Apps | Score |
| Youghal | 2014 | 4 | 0-05 | — | | — | | 4 | 0-05 |
| Youghal | 2015 | 3 | 0-04 | — | | — | | 3 | 0-04 |
| Youghal | 2016 | 3 | 2-03 | — | | — | | 3 | 2-03 |
| Youghal | 2017 | 3 | 0-03 | — | | — | | 3 | 0-03 |
| Youghal | Total | 13 | 2-15 | — | | — | | 13 | 2-15 |
| Youghal | Year | Cork PIHC | | Munster | | All-Ireland | | Total | |
| Youghal | Year | Apps | Score | Apps | Score | Apps | Score | Apps | Score |
| Youghal | 2018 | 3 | 1-03 | — | | — | | 3 | 1-03 |
| Youghal | 2019 | 2 | 0-06 | — | | — | | 2 | 0-06 |
| Youghal | 2020 | 3 | 2-10 | — | | — | | 3 | 2-10 |
| Youghal | Total | 8 | 3-19 | — | | — | | 8 | 3-19 |
| Career total | | 46 | 11-70 | 4 | 0-07 | 2 | 0-05 | 52 | 11-82 |

=== Division ===
As of match played 20 October 2019.

| Team | Year | Cork PSHC | |
| Team | Year | Apps | Score |
|---|---|---|---|
| Imokilly | 2010 | 3 | 1-02 |
| Imokilly | 2011 | 2 | 1-04 |
| Imokilly | 2012 | — | |
| Imokilly | Total | 5 | 2-06 |
| Cork Institute of Technology | 2013 | 2 | 0-04 |
| Cork Institute of Technology | Total | 2 | 0-04 |
| N/A | 2014 | — | |
| N/A | 2015 | — | |
| N/A | 2016 | — | |
| N/A | 2017 | — | |
| Imokilly | 2018 | 6 | 0-08 |
| Imokilly | 2019 | 6 | 0-06 |
| Imokilly | 2020 | 1 | 0-02 |
| Imokilly | Total | 13 | 0-16 |
| Career total | | 20 | 2-26 |

=== Inter-county ===
As of match played 14 November 2020.

| Team | Year | National League | | | Munster | | All-Ireland | | Total | |
| Team | Year | Division | Apps | Score | Apps | Score | Apps | Score | Apps | Score |
|---|---|---|---|---|---|---|---|---|---|---|
| Cork | 2011 | Division 1 | 2 | 0-01 | 0 | 0-00 | 3 | 1-03 | 5 | 1-04 |
| Cork | 2012 | Division 1A | — | | — | | — | | — | |
| Cork | 2013 | Division 1A | — | | — | | — | | — | |
| Cork | 2014 | Division 1B | 0 | 0-00 | 4 | 1-06 | 1 | 0-00 | 5 | 1-06 |
| Cork | 2015 | Division 1A | 5 | 0-02 | 1 | 0-01 | 3 | 0-04 | 9 | 0-07 |
| Cork | 2016 | Division 1A | 6 | 1-05 | 1 | 0-00 | 2 | 0-02 | 9 | 1-07 |
| Cork | 2017 | Division 1A | 6 | 0-06 | 3 | 0-01 | 1 | 0-00 | 10 | 0-07 |
| Cork | 2018 | Division 1A | 5 | 0-06 | 5 | 0-08 | 1 | 0-00 | 11 | 0-14 |
| Cork | 2019 | Division 1A | 5 | 0-04 | 3 | 0-01 | 2 | 0-01 | 10 | 0-06 |
| Cork | 2020 | Division 1A | 5 | 1-02 | 1 | 0-02 | 2 | 0-01 | 8 | 1-05 |
| Career total | | | 34 | 2-26 | 18 | 1-19 | 15 | 1-11 | 67 | 4-56 |

== Honours ==
Youghal

- Munster Intermediate Club Hurling Championship (1): 2013 (c)
- Cork Premier Intermediate Hurling Championship (1): 2013 (c)

Imokilly

- Cork Senior Hurling Championship (2): 2018, 2019

Cork

- Munster Senior Hurling Championship (3): 2014, 2017, 2018
- Munster Intermediate Hurling Championship (1): 2010
