= Neil Ronan =

Irish hurler

Personal information
- Native name: Niall Ó Rónáin (Irish)
- Nickname: The weasel
- Born: 1 September 1979 (age 47) Ballyhea, County Cork, Ireland
- Occupation: Operations director
- Height: 5 ft 10 in (178 cm)

Sport
- Sport: Hurling
- Position: Left wing-forward
Club
Years	Club	Apps (scores)
1995–2015	Ballyhea	24 (13-145)
Club titles
- Cork titles: 0
College
- Years: College
- Waterford Institute of Technology
College titles
- Fitzgibbon titles: 1
Inter-county*
Years	County	Apps (scores)
1999–2009	Cork	28 (4–41)
Inter-county titles
- Munster titles: 4
- All-Irelands: 2
- NHL: 0
- All Stars: 0
- *Inter County team apps and scores correct as of 19:21, 22 October 2014.

Neil Ronan (born 1 September 1979) is an Irish retired hurler who played for North Cork club Ballyhea. He played for the Cork senior hurling team at various times over a ten-year period, during which time he usually lined out as a left wing-forward.

Ronan began his hurling career at club level with Ballyhea. He broke onto the club's senior team as a 15-year-old in 1995. He was an ever-present member of the team for the next 20 years and enjoyed his greatest success in 2014 when the club won the Cork Premier Intermediate Championship. Ronan's prowess also saw him selected for the Avondhu divisional team.

At inter-county level, Ronan was part of the successful Cork under-21 team that won the All-Ireland Championship in 1998. He joined the Cork senior team in 1999. From his debut, Ronan was a regular member of the starting fifteen and made a combined total of 71 National League and Championship appearances in a career that ended with his last game in 2009. During that time he was part of two All-Ireland Championship-winning teams – in 1999 and 2005. He also secured four Munster Championship medals. Ronan retired from inter-county hurling after the 2009 All-Ireland Championship.

== Playing career ==
=== St. Colman's College ===
Ronan played in all grades of hurling with St. Colman's College in Fermoy before progressing onto the college's senior team. On 16 March 1997, he scored ten points from full-forward when St. Colman's College defeated Nenagh CBS by 1-17 to 0-08 to win the Harty Cup. On 27 April, Ronan was again at full-forward and scored 1-07 when St. Colman's College defeated Good Counsel College from New Ross by 4-20 to 0-09 to win the All-Ireland Championship.

=== Waterford Institute of Technology ===
During his studies at the Waterford Institute of Technology, Ronan was selected for the institute's senior hurling team. On 28 February 1999, he scored 1-01 from right corner-forward when Waterford IT defeated University College Cork by 4-15 to 3-12 to win the Fitzgibbon Cup.

=== Ballyhea ===
Ronan joined the Ballyhea club at a young age and played in all grades at juvenile and underage levels. On 26 August 1995, he made his first championship appearance for the Ballyhea senior team in a 2-09 to 1-11 defeat of Imokilly. On 24 September, he was a member of the Ballyhea team that were defeated by Na Piarsaigh in the Cork Senior Championship final.

Ronan was the top scorer in the 2002 Cork Senior Championship. He scored 2-36 from four championship appearances.

Ronan played his club hurling with his local club in Ballyhea. He made his underage debut at the age of eight, and was quickly recognised as one of the club's brightest prospects.

On 12 October 2014, Ronan was at centre-forward when Ballyhea defeated Newcestown by 1-17 to 0-16 to win the Cork Premier Intermediate Championship. The game was not without incident as Ronan was red-carded towards the end of the game. He was subsequently suspended for Ballyhea's Munster Championship campaign.

After twenty years, Ronan played his last championship game for the club on 25 August 2015 in a 2-28 to 3-11 defeat by Imokilly in the 2015 Cork Senior Championship.

=== Cork ===
==== Minor and under-21 ====
After lining out for Cork in the under-14 and under-16 grades, Ronan was later called up to the minor panel, making his only appearance at left corner-forward on 26 June 1996 in a 0-16 to 1-09 defeat by Tipperary in the Munster Minor Hurling Championship.

Ronan subsequently progressed onto the Cork under-21 team and won a Munster Championship medal on 23 August 1998 after coming on as a substitute in Cork's 3-18 to 1-10 defeat of Tipperary in the final. He made the starting fifteen at right wing-forward for the subsequent 2-15 to 2-10 All-Ireland final defeat of Galway on 20 September.

==== Senior ====
Ronan was still a member of the under-21 team when he made his first appearance for the Cork senior team on 21 February 1999. He scored a point in Cork's 0-14 to 1-09 defeat of Kilkenny in the National Hurling League. Ronan made his first championship appearance when he was selected at full-forward on 8 June for Cork's 0-24 to 1-15 Munster Championship defeat of Waterford. On 4 July, he won his first Munster Championship medal after a 1-15 to 0-14 defeat of reigning champions Clare. On 11 September, Ronan was at left wing-forward for the All-Ireland final against Kilkenny which Cork won by 0-12 to 0-11.

Ronan started at left wing-forward for Cork's first two championship games in the 2000 Munster Championship, however, he was dropped from the starting fifteen for the final on 3 July. In spite of this he won a second Munster Championship medal as a non-playing substitute following Cork's 0-23 to 3-12 defeat of Tipperary.

On 14 July 2002, Ronan was at midfield for Cork's 0-21 to 1-09 defeat by Galway in the All-Ireland Qualifiers. On 29 November, Ronan and the other 29 members of the Cork senior hurling panel announced that they were withdrawing their services from the county in the hope of better treatment from the county board. The strike was ultimately resolved in the players’ favour on 13 December, however, Ronan decided to quit inter-county hurling and emigrate to Australia.

On 20 February 2005, Ronan returned to the Cork senior team and scored seven points in a 1-20 to 0-10 National League defeat of Limerick. He won his third Munster Championship medal on 26 June after coming on as a substitute in Cork's 1-21 to 1-16 defeat of Tipperary in the final. On 11 September 2005, Cork faced Galway in the All-Ireland final for the first time since 1990, however, Ronan started the game as a substitute. He came on in the 38th minute but was held scoreless in Cork's 1-21 to 1-16 victory.

Ronan earned a reputation as an impact-sub during the 2006 Munster Championship. On 25 June, he won his fourth Munster Championship medal after coming on as a substitute in Cork's 2-14 to 1-14 defeat of Tipperary for the second consecutive year. Cork subsequently qualified for a fourth successive All-Ireland final, with Kilkenny providing the opposition for the third time. Ronan started the game at left wing-forward but was later replaced by Kieran Murphy in the 1-16 to 1-13 defeat.

The Cork team went into decline over the next few years, however, Ronan was a regular impact sub throughout the 2007 and 2008 seasons. After playing in three of Cork's games during the 2009 National League he was an unused substitute during Cork's subsequent championship campaign. Ronan left the Cork panel following the conclusion of the 2009 All-Ireland Championship.

=== Munster ===
On 11 November 2001, Ronan was introduced as a substitute for David Forde when Munster defeated Connacht by 1-21 to 1-15 to win the Railway Cup.

== Career statistics ==
=== Club ===
Team	Year	Cork SHC	
Team	Year	Apps	Score
Ballyhea	1995	2	0-01
Ballyhea	1996	1	0-02
Ballyhea	1997	1	1-07
Ballyhea	1998	1	1-07
Ballyhea	1999	2	1-06
Ballyhea	2000	5	4-35
Ballyhea	2001	2	2-19
Ballyhea	2002	4	2-36
Ballyhea	2003	4	2-27
Ballyhea	Total	22	13-140
Ballyhea	Year	Cork PIHC	
Ballyhea	Year	Apps	Score
Ballyhea	2004	—	
Ballyhea	2005	3	2-11
Ballyhea	2006	3	3-17
Ballyhea	2007	2	0-12
Ballyhea	2008	3	1-22
Ballyhea	2009	3	0-08
Ballyhea	2010	3	1-19
Ballyhea	2011	—	
Ballyhea	2012	3	0-22
Ballyhea	2013	2	2-09
Ballyhea	2014	5	0-26
Ballyhea	Total	27	9-144
Ballyhea	Year	Cork SHC	
Ballyhea	Year	Apps	Score
Ballyhea	2015	2	0-05
Ballyhea	Total	2	0-05
Career total		51	22-289

=== Inter-county ===
Team	Year	National League			Munster		All-Ireland		Total	
Team	Year	Division	Apps	Score	Apps	Score	Apps	Score	Apps	Score
Cork	1999	Division 1B	1	0-01	2	0-01	2	0-00	5	0-02
Cork	2000	Division 1B	6	5-07	2	0-09	1	0-00	9	5-16
Cork	2001	Division 1B	5	0-07	1	0-00	—		6	0-07
Cork	2002	Division 1B	5	0-07	0	0-00	1	0-01	6	0-08
Cork	2003	Division 1B	4	0-02	—		—		4	0-02
Cork	2004	Division 1B	—		—		—		—	
Cork	2005	Division 1B	7	0-30	2	0-03	3	0-02	12	0-35
Cork	2006	Division 1A	3	1-13	2	0-01	3	0-06	8	1-20
Cork	2007	Division 1A	6	1-12	2	0-00	5	4-13	13	5-25
Cork	2008	Division 1A	2	2-14	0	0-00	3	0-05	5	2-19
Cork	2009	Division 1A	3	0-01	0	0-00	0	0-00	3	0-01
Career total			42	9-94	11	0-14	18	4-27	71	13-135

=== Inter-provincial ===
Team	Year	Railway Cup	
Team	Year	Apps	Score
Munster	2001	2	0-00
Career total		2	0-00

== Honours ==
=== Player ===
St. Colman's College

- Dr Croke Cup (1): 1997
- Dr Harty Cup (1): 1997

Waterford Institute of Technology

- Fitzgibbon Cup (1): 1999

Ballyhea

- Cork Premier Intermediate Hurling Championship (1): 2014
- Cork Junior B Inter-Divisional Hurling Championship (1): 2022

Cork

- All-Ireland Senior Hurling Championship (2): 1999, 2005
- Munster Senior Hurling Championship (4): 1999, 2000, 2005, 2006
- All-Ireland Under-21 Hurling Championship (1): 1998
- Munster Under-21 Hurling Championship (1): 1998

Munster

- Railway Cup (1): 2001
