= Stephen Moylan (hurler) =

Irish hurler (born 1987)

Personal information
- Native name: Stiofán Ó Maoileáin (Irish)
- Born: 18 October 1987 (age 39) Douglas, Cork, Ireland
- Occupation: Secondary school teacher
- Height: 6 ft 1 in (185 cm)

Sport
- Sport: Hurling
- Position: Right corner-forward
Club*
Years	Club	Apps (scores)
2005-present	Douglas	31 (5-100)
Club titles
- Cork titles: 0
College
- Years: College
- 2006-2012: University College Cork
College titles
- Fitzgibbon titles: 2
Inter-county**
Years	County	Apps (scores)
2012-2016	Cork	15 (1-06)
Inter-county titles
- Munster titles: 1
- All-Irelands: 0
- NHL: 0
- All Stars: 0
- * club appearances and scores correct as of 12:44, 1 September 2019. **Inter County team apps and scores correct as of 23:05, 24 February 2019.

Stephen Moylan (born 18 October 1987) is an Irish hurler who plays for Cork Senior Championship club Douglas. He played for the Cork senior hurling team for five seasons, during which time he usually lined out as a right corner-forward.

Moylan began his hurling career at club level with Douglas. He broke onto the club's top adult team as a 17-year-old in 2005 and enjoyed his greatest success in 2009 when the club won the Premier Intermediate Championship and promotion to the top flight of Cork hurling.

At inter-county level, Moylan was part of the successful Cork minor team that won back-to-back Munster Championships in 2004 and 2005 before later winning a Munster Championship with the under-21 team in 2007. Moylan was left corner-forward on the Cork intermediate team that won the All-Ireland Championship in 2009. He joined the Cork senior team in 2012. From his debut, Moylan was used as an impact sub and made many National League and Championship appearances in a career that ended with his last game in 2016. During that time he was part of the Cork Munster Championship-winning team in 2014. Moylan was released from the Cork senior panel in April 2016.

== Playing career ==
=== University College Cork ===
During his studies at University College Cork, Moylan established himself as a forward on the senior hurling team. On 7 March 2009, he scored four points from right corner-forward when UCC defeated the University of Limerick by 2-17 t0 0–14 to win the Fitzgibbon Cup.

On 3 March 2012, Moylan scored two points from right corner-forward when UCC defeated the Cork Institute of Technology by 2–15 to 2–14 to win the Fitzgibbon Cup.

=== Douglas ===
Moylan joined the Douglas club at a young age and played in all grades at juvenile and underage levels. On 18 December 2005, he scored two points from left corner-forward when Douglas suffered a 0–13 to 0–10 defeat by Erin's Own in the final of the Cork Under-21 Championship.

On 12 May 2007, Moylan made his first appearance for Douglas in the Cork Senior Championship. He scored two points in a 0–16 to 0–10 defeat by Cloyne.

On 11 October 2009, Moylan enjoyed his first success at adult level with Douglas. He won a Cork Premier Intermediate Championship medal following a 0–20 to 0–16 defeat of Ballymartle in the final. It remains their only championship title in this grade.

=== Cork ===
==== Minor and under-21 ====
Moylan first played for Cork as a member of the minor team. He made his first appearance for the team on 7 April 2004 when he was introduced as a substitute for Richard O'Connell in a 0–16 to 1–09 defeat of Waterford in the Munster Championship. On 27 June, Moylan won a Munster Championship medal as a non-playing substitute following Cork's 2–12 to 3–08 defeat of Tipperary in the final.

Moylan was eligible for the minor grade again the following year. On 26 June, he was a non-playing substitute in Cork's 2–18 to 1–12 defeat of Limerick in the Munster final.

On 6 June 2007, Moylan made his first appearance for the Cork under-21 team in a 1–14 to 2–10 defeat of Tipperary in the Munster Championship. On 1 August, he was a non-playing substitute in Cork's 1–20 to 0–10 defeat of Waterford in the Munster final.

Moylan played his last game for the under-21 team on 20 July 2008 when he lined out at right corner-forward in a 1–20 to 1–11 defeat by Clare.

==== Intermediate ====
Moylan was drafted onto the Cork intermediate team for the 2009 Munster Championship. He made his first appearance on 31 May when he lined out at right wing-forward in a 1–24 to 2–06 defeat of Tipperary. On 22 July, Moylan won a Munster Championship medal after scoring four points in Cork's 5–24 to 3–09 defeat of Waterford in the final. On 29 August, he scored three points left corner-forward in Cork's 2–23 to 0–16 defeat of Kilkenny in the All-Ireland final.

==== Senior ====
Moylan made his first appearance for the Cork senior team on 7 July 2012. He scored two points after being introduced as a 64th-minute substitute for Paudie O'Sullivan in a 1–26 to 2–16 defeat of Offaly in the All-Ireland Qualifiers.

On 14 July 2013, Moylan was a non-playing substitute when Cork suffered a 0–24 to 0–15 defeat by Limerick in the Munster final. On 8 September, he was again named as a substitute when Cork faced Clare in the All-Ireland final. He was introduced as a half-time substitute for Jamie Coughlan in the 3–16 to 0–25 draw. Moylan was again named as a substitute for the replay on 28 September. He was again introduced as a half-time substitute, this time for Luke O'Farrell, and scored 1–01 in the 5–16 to 3–16 defeat.

On 3 May 2015, Moylan was a non-playing substitute in Cork's 1–24 to 0–17 defeat by Waterford in the National League final.

Moylan made three appearances for Cork during the 2016 National League but was released from the panel before the start of the Munster Championship.

== Career statistics ==
=== Club ===
As of match played 31 August 2019.

Team	Year	Cork SHC		Munster		All-Ireland		Total	
Team	Year	Apps	Score	Apps	Score	Apps	Score	Apps	Score
Douglas	2005	3	0-11	—		—		3	0-11
Douglas	2006	3	1-11	—		—		3	1-11
Douglas	2007	4	1-14	—		—		4	1-14
Douglas	Total	10	2-36	—		—		10	2-36
Douglas	Year	Cork PIHC		Munster		All-Ireland		Total	
Douglas	Year	Apps	Score	Apps	Score	Apps	Score	Apps	Score
Douglas	2008	5	0-18	—		—		5	0-18
Douglas	2009	7	1-11	3	0-04	—		10	1-15
Douglas	Total	12	1-29	3	0-04	—		15	1-33
Douglas	Year	Cork SHC		Munster		All-Ireland		Total	
Douglas	Year	Apps	Score	Apps	Score	Apps	Score	Apps	Score
Douglas	2010	4	0-23	—		—		4	0-23
Douglas	2011	3	0-07	—		—		3	0-07
Douglas	2012	1	1-03	—		—		1	1-03
Douglas	2013	4	3-05	—		—		4	3-05
Douglas	2014	5	0-09	—		—		5	0-09
Douglas	2015	3	1-01	—		—		3	1-01
Douglas	2016	5	0-00	—		—		4	0-00
Douglas	2017	2	0-00	—		—		2	0-00
Douglas	2018	2	0-00	—		—		2	0-00
Douglas	2019	1	0-00	—		—		1	0-00
Douglas	Total	20	3-64	—		—		20	3-64
Career total		42	6-129	3	0-04	—		45	6-133

=== Inter-county ===
Team	Year	National League			Munster		All-Ireland		Total	
Team	Year	Division	Apps	Score	Apps	Score	Apps	Score	Apps	Score
Cork	2012	Division 1A	0	0-00	0	0-00	4	0-02	4	0-02
Cork	2013	Division 1A	6	1-07	1	0-00	4	1-03	11	2-10
Cork	2014	Division 1B	4	0-04	4	0-01	1	0-00	9	0-05
Cork	2015	Division 1A	5	0-00	0	0-00	1	0-00	6	0-00
Cork	2016	Division 1A	3	0-00	—		—		3	0-00
Career total			18	1-11	5	0-01	10	1-05	33	2-17

== Honours ==
University College Cork

- Fitzgibbon Cup (2): 2009, 2012

Douglas

- Cork Premier Intermediate Hurling Championship (1): 2009
- Douglas clubman of the year 2025

Cork

- Munster Senior Hurling Championship (1): 2014
- All-Ireland Intermediate Hurling Championship (1): 2009
- Munster Intermediate Hurling Championship (1): 2009
- Munster Under-21 Hurling Championship (1): 2007
- Munster Minor Hurling Championship (3): 2004, 2005
