= Bill Cooper =

Bill Cooper may refer to:

- Bill Cooper (baseball) (1915–1985), American Negro leagues baseball player
- Bill Cooper (sailor) (1928–2016), Royal Navy officer, sailor and author
- Bill Cooper (Georgia politician) (born 1933), American former politician and judge
- Bill Cooper (American football) (born 1939), professional football player for the San Francisco 49ers
- Bill Cooper (hurler) (born 1987), Irish hurler
- Milton William "Bill" Cooper (born 1943), American conspiracy theorist

== See also ==
- Billy Cooper
- William Cooper
