= William Cooper =

William Cooper may refer to:

== Business ==
- William Cooper (businessman) (1761–1840), Canadian businessman
- William Cooper (co-operator) (1822–1868), English co-operator
- William Cooper (accountant) (1826–1871), founder of Cooper Brothers
- William W. Cooper (1914–2012), management scientist
- William E. Cooper (civic leader) (1921–2008), businessman in Dallas, Texas

== Government ==
- William B. Cooper (Delaware politician) (1771–1849), American farmer and politician
- William B. Cooper (North Carolina politician) (1867–1959), lieutenant governor of North Carolina
- William C. Cooper (politician) (1832–1902), US congressman from Ohio
- William Cooper (New York politician) (1754–1809), father of James Fenimore Cooper and founder of Cooperstown, New York
- William Cooper (Prince Edward Island politician), speaker of the Legislative Assembly of Prince Edward Island
- Prentice Cooper (William Prentice Cooper, 1895–1969), Tennessee governor
- William R. Cooper (1793–1856), US congressman from New Jersey
- William Frierson Cooper (1820–1909), lawyer, politician and judge of the Tennessee Supreme Court
- Bill Cooper (Georgia politician) (born 1933), American former politician and judge
- William Cooper (Australian politician) (1868–1957), member of the Queensland Legislative Assembly
- William Prentice Cooper (1870–1961), speaker of the Tennessee House of Representatives
- Sir William Cooper, 1st Baronet (c.1689–1761), Irish lawyer and politician
- William S. Cooper (judge) (born 1941), American lawyer and justice of the Kentucky Supreme Court

== Literature and arts ==
- William Brown Cooper (1811–1900), American painter
- William Cooper Nell (1816–1874), African-American abolitionist
- Revd William Cooper (1824–1892), pseudonym of James Bertram, Scottish pornography producer
- William C. Cooper (actor) (1853–1918), stage and film actor
- William Sidney Cooper (1854–1927), English landscape artist
- William Heaton Cooper (1903–1995), British landscape artist
- William Cooper (novelist) (1910–2002), British novelist
- William T. Cooper (1934–2015), Australian natural history illustrator
- William Y. Cooper (1934–2016), African-American painter, writer and illustrator
- William J. Cooper Jr. (born 1940), American historian
- Milton William Cooper (1943–2001), known as Bill, American conspiracy theorist and author
- William Cooper, a CIA agent in the 2010 film Red

== Science ==
- William Cooper (conchologist) (1798–1864), American conchologist
- William Cooper (chemical manufacturer) (1813–1885), British sheep dip manufacturer
- William White Cooper (1816–1886), English surgeon-oculist
- William Skinner Cooper (1894–1978), American ecologist

== Sports ==
- William Cooper (cricketer) (1849–1939), Australian cricketer
- Willie Cooper (footballer, born 1886) (1886–?), English footballer for Barnsley and Rochdale
- William Osborne Cooper (1891–1930), Australian cricketer
- Willie Cooper (1909–1994), Scottish footballer (Aberdeen FC)
- William Cooper (sailor) (1910–1968), Olympic gold medalist of 1932
- Bill Cooper (baseball) (1915–1985), American Negro leagues baseball player
- Billy Cooper (footballer) (1917–?), English footballer
- Bill Cooper (sailor) (1928–2016), Royal Navy officer, sailor and author
- Bill Cooper (American football) (born 1939), professional football player for the San Francisco 49ers
- Billy Cooper (Canadian football) (born 1945), Canadian football player
- Bill Cooper (hurler) (born 1987), Irish hurler
- Billy Cooper (trumpeter), cricket supporter and trumpet player for the Barmy Army

== Other fields ==
- William Cooper (Puritan) (fl. 1653), chaplain to Elizabeth of Bohemia and ejected minister
- William Cooper (banker), governor of the Bank of England from 1769 to 1771
- William Durrant Cooper (1812–1875), English lawyer and antiquary
- William Cooper (priest) (1833/34–1909), Church of England priest
- William Cooper (Quaker) (1856–1952), director of Cadbury Ltd in Australia
- William Cooper (Aboriginal Australian) (c. 1860–1941), Aboriginal rights leader
- William John Cooper (1882–1935), American educator
- William Turakiuta Cooper (1886–1949), New Zealand interpreter and land officer
- William Cooper (police officer) (c.1888–1941), one of 4 New Zealand police officers shot in the 1941 Kowhitirangi shootings.
- William E. Cooper (general) (1929–2023), United States Army general
- William E. Cooper (university president), president of the University of Richmond (1998–2007)

== See also ==
- William Couper (disambiguation)
- William Cowper (disambiguation)
