= Daithí Cooney =

Irish hurler

Personal information
- Native name: Daithí Ó Cuana (Irish)
- Born: 1954 (age 71–72) Youghal, County Cork, Ireland

Sport
- Sport: Hurling
- Position: Goalkeeper
Club
- Years: Club
- Youghal
Club titles
- Cork titles: 0
Inter-county
Years	County	Apps (scores)
1982-1983	Cork	0 (0-00)
Inter-county titles
- Munster titles: 2
- All-Irelands: 0
- NHL: 0
- All Stars: 0

Daithí Cooney (born 1954) is an Irish retired hurler who played as a goalkeeper for the Cork senior team.

Cooney joined the team during the 1982 championship and was a regular member of the extended panel until his retirement after the 1983 championship. During that time, he won two Munster medals as a non-playing substitute. Cooney was an All-Ireland runner-up on two occasions.

At club level Cooney enjoyed a lengthy career with Youghal.

His brother, Christy Cooney, served as President of the Gaelic Athletic Association between 2009 and 2012.
