= William Couper =

William Couper may refer to:

- William Couper (bishop) (1568–1619), Scottish bishop and theologian
- William Couper (sculptor) (1853–1942), American sculptor
- William Couper (naturalist) (fl. 1850s–1886), American entomologist and naturalist

== See also ==
- William Cooper (disambiguation)
- William Cowper (disambiguation)
