= 2012 Cork Premier Intermediate Hurling Championship =

- Dates: 27 May 2012 – 7 October 2012
- Teams: 16
- Champions: Ballinhassig (2nd title); Darren Dineen (captain); Johnny Crowley (manager)
- Runners-up: Bandon; James O'Donovan (captain); Teddy McCarthy (manager)
- Relegated: Aghabullogue

Tournament statistics
- Matches played: 28
- Goals scored: 62 (2.21 per match)
- Points scored: 725 (25.89 per match)
- Top scorer(s): Ronan Crowley (4-33)

The 2012 Cork Premier Intermediate Hurling Championship was the ninth staging of the Cork Premier Intermediate Hurling Championship since its establishment by the Cork County Board in 2004. The championship began on 27 May 2012 and ended on 7 October 2012.

On 1 September 2012, Aghabullogue were relegated from the championship following a 1-21 to 0-12 defeat by Watergrasshill.

On 7 October 2012, Ballinhassig won the championship following a 1-19 to 1-12 defeat of Bandon in the final. This was their second championship title overall and their first in seven championship seasons.

Bandon's Ronan Crowley was the championship's top scorer with 4-33.

== Teams ==
A total of 16 teams contested the Premier Intermediate Championship, including 14 teams from the 2011 premier intermediate championship, one relegated from the 2011 senior championship and one promoted from the 2011 intermediate championship.

== Team changes ==
=== To Championship ===
Promoted from the Cork Intermediate Hurling Championship

- Charleville

Relegated from the Cork Senior Hurling Championship

- Ballinhassig

=== From Championship ===
Promoted to the Cork Senior Hurling Championship

- Courcey Rovers

Relegated to the Cork Intermediate Hurling Championship

- Argideen Rangers

== Results ==
=== Round 1 ===
27 May 2012 Round 1	Newcestown	0-12 - 0-13	Ballyhea	Mallow GAA Complex, Mallow
	E Kelly 0-4, 0-3 frees, M Bradfield 0-3, G O'Rourke 0-2, F Keane, T Horgan and C Keane 0-1 each.	Report	N Ronan 0-6, 0-5 frees, M O'Sullivan 0-3, M Morrissey, J O'Sullivan, T Shanahan and K Morrissey 0-1 each.	Referee: T O'Leary (Watergrasshill)

27 May 2012 Round 1	Ballinhassig	0-19 - 0-12	Mallow	Ballinaboy
	F O’Leary 0-4, B Coleman, D Dineen (3fs), P Coomey 0-3 each, S Dineen, D Brennan 0-2 each, M Sheehan, B Lombard 0-1 each.	Report	A Sheehan 0-4fs, D Hayes 0-3 (1f), P Herlihy, C Moloney 0-2 each, M Maher 0-1.	Referee: J Larkin (Douglas)

27 May 2012 Round 1	Carrigaline	1-16 - 0-10	Tracton	Páirc Uí Rinn, Cork
	R O’Shea 0-7 (0-6 frees), S Corcoran 1-2, S O’Brien 0-4, D Drake 0-3.	Report	R Walsh 0-5 (frees), Joe Kingston 0-2, K Lynch, G Kingston and M O’Sullivan 0-1 each.	Referee: C Lane (Banteer)

1 June 2012 Round 1	Blarney	1-15 - 0-12	Castlelyons	Riverstown
	M Cremin 0-6, J O'Sullivan 1-0, P O'Driscoll 0-2, B O'Connell 0-2, E McCarthy 0-2, S Mulcahy 0-2, J Hurley 0-1.		C Spillane 0-3, D Tobin 0-3, B Fitzgerald 0-2, R Feeney 0-2, A Spillane 0-1, A Fenton 0-1.	Referee: N Wall (Carrigaline)

2 June 2012 Round 1	Ballincollig	0-13 - 0-15 (aet)	Kilbrittain	Brinny
	A Donovan 0-4 (2fs), C O’Sullivan (2fs), B Glavin 0-3 each, K Hickey 0-2, F Hickey 0-1	Report	M Sexton 0-11 (6fs), R Cashman 0-3 (1 65), A Hayes 0-1.	Referee: C Lyons (Nemo Rangers)

2 June 2012 Round 1	Watergrasshill	0-06 - 0-08	Youghal	Killeagh
	P O’Regan 0-3 (frees), E O’Reilly, P Cahill 0-1 each.	Report	B Ring 0-3 (frees), D Ring 0-2 (frees), A Frahill- O’Connor, N Roche, A Curtin 0-1 each.	Referee: M Moynihan (Grenagh)

3 June 2012 Round 1	Valley Rovers	0-08 - 1-08	Inniscarra	Cloughduv
	J Hurley 0-4 (3f, 1 65), W Burke (1f), D Crowley (1f), R Fleming, J Lynch 0-1 each.	Report	C Casey 1-2, F Olden (2f), J Olden 0-2 each, J Casey, C Buckley 0-1 each.	Referee: M O'Mahony (Kilbrittain)

3 June 2012 Round 1	Bandon	4-16 - 0-11	Aghabullogue	Cloughduv
	R Crowley 0-10 (0-8f), M Sugrue, M Cahalane 2-2 each, J Harrington, D Crowley 0-1 each.	Report	F Foley 0-7 (0-5f, 0-1 65), J Corkery 0-2, P O’Rourke, N Buckley 0-1 each.	Referee: D O'Learey (Watergrasshill)

=== Round 2 ===
9 June 2012 Round 2	Ballincollig	0-12 - 0-07	Watergrasshill	Kilbrittain
	C O’Sullivan 0-5 (4fs), A Donovan, B Glavin, C Harris, J O’Brien, K Hickey, F Kelly (f), F Hickey 0-1 each.	Report	P O’Regan 0-4fs, A Cronin, W Connolly, K O’Neill 0-1 each.	Referee: K Murphy (Nemo Rangers)

17 June 2012 Round 2	Tracton	0-21 - 1-12	Aghabullogue	Cloughduv
	R Walsh 0-9 (0-7f, 0-1 65), Joe Kingston 0-4, M O’Sullivan 0-3, K Lynch 0-2, G Kingston, J Harrington, S O’Sullivan 0-1 each.	Report	F Foley 0-8 (0-7f, 0-1 65), D O’Leary 1-0, D Twomey 0-2, N Buckley, J Buckley 0-1 each.	Referee: D Daly (Brian Dillons)

17 June 2012 Round 2	Mallow	3-20 - 3-19 (aet)	Newcestown	Cloughduv
	A Sheehan 0-10 (0-6 frees), C Moloney 1-2, C Murphy 0-4, D Hayes and P Herlihy 1-0 each, C Leahy 0-3, K Sheehan 0-1.	Report	M Bradfield 1-7 (0-5 frees), D Twomey 1-4, T Horgan 1-2, G O’Rourke 0-2, F Keane, T Twomey, B Horgan and G O’Driscoll 0-1 each.	Referee: J Bermingham (Bride Rovers)

17 June 2012 Round 2	Castlelyons	0-15 - 3-08	Valley Rovers	Caherlag
	T McCarthy 0-4 (0-2 frees), A Fenton (frees) and A Spillane 0-3 each, P McMahon 0-2, D Tobin, C McGann (65m), C Barry 0-1 each.	Report	K Canty 2-2, T Burke 1-1, J Hurley (65m), F Coughlan, D Crowley, E Manning, J Crowley 0-1 each.	Referee: J Larkin (Douglas)

=== Round 3 ===
8 July 2012 Round 3	Watergrasshill	1-12 - 2-12	Castlelyons	Rathcormac
	P O’Regan 1-6 (1-4 frees, 0-1 65m), E Barry 0-2, A Cronin, E O’Reilly, J McCarthy and P Cahill 0-1 each.	Report	A Spillane 0-6 (0-4 frees), C Spillane 1-2, B Fitzgerald 1-0, P Mahon, T McCarthy, D Lawlor and D Tobin 0-1 each.	Referee: D Copps (Ballyhea)

9 July 2012 Round 3	Newcestown	3-19 - 1-11	Aghabullogue	Cloughduv
	E Kelly 2-3 (0-2 frees), M Bradfield 1-3, D Twomey 0-5 (0-3 frees), G O’Driscoll, T Twomey and C Keane 0-2 each, B Horgan and A Shorten 0-1 each.	Report	F Foley 0-5 (0-3 frees, 0-1 sl), G Murphy 1-0, D Twomey and J Corkery 0-3 each.	Referee: D Daly (Brian Dillons)

=== Relegation play-off ===
1 September 2012 Play-off	Watergrasshill	1-21 - 0-12	Aghabullogue	Cloughduv
	P O’Regan 0-10 (0-9 f, 0-1 65), E Barry, J Halbert 1-3 each, S O’Callaghan, P Cahill 0-2 each, S O’Regan 0-1.	Report	M O’Flynn 0-7 (0-6 f), John Corkery 0-3, J Buckley, D Twomey 0-1 each.	Referee: D Daly (Brian Dillons)

=== Round 4 ===
28 July 2012 Round 4	Bandon	1-08 - 0-10	Castlelyons	Caherlag
	M Sugrue 1-0, R Crowley 0-3 (2fs), M Cahalane 0-2, D Crowley, A Johnson and J McCarthy 0-1 each.	Report	D Tobin, R Feeney 0-3 (3f) each, A O’Sullivan 0-2 (1 sl), C McGann (1f), B Fitzgerald 0-1 each.	Referee: J Larkin (Douglas)

28 July 2012 Round 4	Tracton	0-11 - 5-16	Youghal	Caherlag
	R Walsh 0-8 (7fs, 1 65), S O’Sullivan 0-2, K Lynch 0-1.	Report	B Ring 0-10 (7fs, 1 65), AF O’Connor 2-3, J Ormonde 2-0, B Coleman 1-0, J O’Mahony 0-2, A Curtin 0-1.	Referee: J Sexton (Ballyhea)

28 July 2012 Round 4	Newcestown	2-09 - 1-13	Ballinhassig	Brinny
	E Kelly 1-5 (1-0pen, 4fs), F Keane 1-1, H Curran, M Bradfield, T Twomey 0-1 each.	Report	D Dineen 0-8 (7fs), M Coleman 1-0f, P Coomey, F O’Leary, S Dineen, M Collins, Shane McCarthy 0-1 each.	Referee: J Dorgan (Nemo Rangers)

28 July 2012 Round 4	Mallow	1-06 - 1-11	Blarney	Páirc Uí Rinn, Cork
	D Hayes 1-0, C Murphy, A Sheehan (2f) 0-2 each, C Moloney, D Kerrisk 0-1 each.	Report	P O'Driscoll 0-6 (5fs, 1 65), B Hurley 1-0, E McCarthy, J O'Sullivan (f), D Cronin, E O'Connor, J Hurley 0-1 each.	Referee: N Wall (Carrigaline)

28 July 2012 Round 4	Ballyhea	2-15 - 0-14	Kilbrittain	Coachford
	N Ronan 0-6 (3fs, 1 65), M O’Sullivan 1-2, J O’Sullivan 1-1, J Morrissey 0-3, P O’Callaghan 0-2, K Hanley 0-1.	Report	M Sexton 0-5 (0-4 frees), R Cashman 0-3 (0-2 frees), V O’Brien 0-2, C O’Leary, P O’Mahony, C Hickey, D Hickey.	Referee: D Kirwan (Éire Óg)

29 July 2012 Round 4	Carrigaline	2-16 - 1-11	Ballincollig	Balgooly GAA Grounds, Belgooly
	T Murphy 1-3 (0-1 free), R O’Shea 0-5 (0-4 frees), S O’Brien 1-1, N Coakley 0-3, D Drake 0-2, K Cavanagh and S Corcoran 0-1 each.	Report	C Sexton 1-2, C O’Sullivan 0-5 (0-4 frees, 0-1 65m), I Coughlan 0-2, D Bowen and J Miskella 0-1 each.	Referee: K Murphy (Nemo Rangers)

=== Quarter-finals ===
3 August 2012 Quarter-final	Inniscarra	1-12 - 1-10	Valley Rovers	Cloughduv
	A O’Mahony 0-10 (0-9f, 0-1 65), T Murphy 1-0, J Olden, C Buckley 0-1 each.	Report	E Collins 0-4 (0-3f), E Manning 1-0, D Coughlan, J Hurley (0-2 65) 0-2 each, J Burke, F Coughlan 0-1 each.	Referee: J Bermingham (Bride Rovers)

4 August 2012 Quarter-final	Youghal	3-17 - 1-09	Blarney	Páirc Uí Rinn, Cork
	B Ring 0-6 (2f); B Moloney 1-2; A Curtin 1-2; B Coleman 0-2; N Roche 0-2; D Ring (f), A Frehill-O’Connor, J Ormonde, 0-1 each.	Report	M Cremin 0-4 (1f); J Hurley 1-0; P O’Driscoll 0-2 (1f); B Hurley, O O’Connor, P O’Sullivan, 0-1 each.	Referee: D Copps (Ballyhea)

11 August 2012 Quarter-final	Ballinhassig	2-18 - 2-14	Ballyhea	Mallow GAA Complex, Mallow
	D Dineen 0-9 (5fs, 1 65), F O’Leary 1-3, M Coleman 1-0pen, M Aherne (1f), S McCarthy, P Coomey, S Dineen, D O’Donovan, B Coleman 0-1 each.	Report	N Ronan 0-10 (6fs, 1 65), J Morrissey 2-0, K Morrissey 0-3, P O’Callaghan 0-1_	Referee: J Larkin (Douglas)

18 August 2012 Quarter-final	Bandon	4-15 - 2-12	Carrigaline	Páirc Uí Ríogáin, Ballinspittle
	R Crowley 3-6 (3fs), M Sugrue 1-2, M Cahalane 0-4, D Crowley, N O’Rourke, R Payne 0-1 each.	Report	T Murphy 1-2 (2fs), S Corcoran 1-2, R O’Shea (3fs), S O’Brien (1 45) 0-3 each, K MacIntyre, D Drake 0-1 each.	Referee: K Murphy (Nemo Rangers)

=== Semi-finals ===
25 August 2012 Semi-final	Bandon	1-16 - 0-06	Youghal	Páirc Uí Rinn, Cork
	R Crowley 0-8 (6fs), R Payne 1-2, M Sugrue 0-4, M Cahalane 0-2.	Report	B Ring 0-5fs, J O’Mahony 0-1.	Referee: K Murphy (Nemo Rangers)

25 August 2012 Semi-final	Ballinhassig	2-18 - 0-09	Inniscarra	Páirc Uí Rinn, Cork
	P O’Sullivan 1-4, D Dineen 0-5fs, M Collins 1-1, F O’Leary 0-3, P Coomey, M Aherne (f), B Coleman, D Brennan, S Dineen 0-1 each.	Report	A O’Mahony 0-7 (5fs), C Buckley and A Sheehan 0-1 each.	Referee: C Lyons (Nemo Rangers)

=== Final ===
7 October 2012 Final	Ballinhassig	1-19 – 1-12	Bandon	Páirc Uí Chaoimh, Cork
	F O’Leary 1-2, P O’Sullivan, D Dineen (0-1 free) and S Dineen 0-3 each, B Coleman, M Sheehan and M Aherne (frees) 0-2 each, P Coomey and D O’Donovan 0-1 each.	Report	R Crowley 1-6 (0-5 frees), D Crowley 0-2, J Hickey 0-3, M Cahalane, K Hurley, J McCarthy and M Sugrue 0-1 each.	Referee: D Kirwan (Éire Óg)

== Championship statistics ==
=== Scoring events ===
- Widest winning margin: 17 points
  - Bandon 4-16 - 0-11 Aghabullogue (Round 1)
- Most goals in a match: 6
  - Mallow 3-20 - 3-19 Newcestown (Round 2)
  - Bandon 4-15 - 2-12 Carrigaline (Quarter-final)
- Most points in a match: 39
  - Mallow 3-20 - 3-19 Newcestown (Round 2)
- Most goals by one team in a match: 4
  - Bandon 4-16 - 0-11 Aghabullogue (Round 1)
  - Bandon 4-15 - 2-12 Carrigaline (Quarter-final)
- Most goals scored by a losing team: 3
  - Newcestown 3-19 - 3-20 Mallow (Round 2)
- Most points scored by a losing team: 19
  - Newcestown 3-19 - 3-20 Mallow (Round 2)

=== Top scorers ===
Top scorer overall

Rank	Player	Club	Tally	Total	Matches	Average
1	Ronan Crowley	Bandon	4-33	45	5	9.00
2	Darren Dineen	Ballinhassig	0-28	28	5	5.60
3	Paddy O'Regan	Watergrasshill	1-23	26	4	6.50
4	Brendan Ring	Youghal	0-24	24	4	6.00
5	Neil Ronan	Ballyhea	0-22	22	3	7.33
5	Ronan Walsh	Tracton	0-22	22	3	7.33
6	Eoin Kelly	Newcestown	3-12	21	3	7.00
6	Mark Sugrue	Bandon	4-09	21	5	4.20
7	Mikey Bradfield	Newcestown	2-14	20	4	5.00
7	Finbarr Foley	Aghabullogue	0-20	20	3	6.66

Top scorers in a single game

Rank	Player	Club	Tally	Total	Opposition
1	Ronan Crowley	Bandon	3-06	15	Carrigaline
2	Maurice Sexton	Kilbrittain	0-11	11	Ballincollig
3	Mikey Bradfield	Newcestown	1-07	10	Mallow
3	Ronan Crowley	Bandon	0-10	10	Aghabullogue
3	Aaron Sheehan	Mallow	0-10	10	Newcestown
3	Paddy O'Regan	Watergrasshill	0-10	10	Aghabullogue
3	Brendan Ring	Youghal	0-10	10	Tracton
3	Aidan O'Mahony	Inniscarra	0-10	10	Valley Rovers
3	Neil Ronan	Ballyhea	0-10	10	Ballinahssig
4	Eoin Kelly	Newcestown	2-03	9	Aghabullogue
4	Alan Frahill-O'Connor	Youghal	2-03	9	Tracton
4	Paddy O'Regan	Watergrasshill	1-06	9	Castlelyons
4	Ronan Crowley	Bandon	1-06	9	Ballinhassig
4	Ronan Walsh	Tracton	0-09	9	Aghabullogue
4	Darren Dineen	Ballinahssig	0-09	9	Ballyhea

=== Miscellaneous ===
- Ballinhassig become the first team to win the championship more than once.
