= Darragh O'Sullivan (Cork hurler) =

Irish hurler

Personal information
- Native name: Darragh Ó Súilleabháin (Irish)
- Born: 2004 (age 21–22) Ballinhassig, County Cork, Ireland
- Occupation: Student
- Height: 5 ft 11 in (180 cm)

Sport
- Sport: Hurling
- Position: Left corner-back
Club
- Years: Club
- 2022-present: Ballinhassig
Club titles
- Cork titles: 0
College
- Years: College
- 2023-present: MTU Cork
College titles
- Fitzgibbon titles: 0
Inter-county*
Years	County	Apps (scores)
2025-2026	Cork	0 (0-00)
Inter-county titles
- Munster titles: 1
- All-Irelands: 0
- NHL: 1
- All Stars: 0
- *Inter County team apps and scores correct as of 21:30, 6 April 2025.

Darragh O'Sullivan (born 2004) is an Irish hurler. At club level, he plays with Ballinhassig and at inter-county level with the Cork senior hurling team.

== Career ==
O'Sullivan played hurling at all grades as a student at Coláiste an Spioraid Naoimh in Bishopstown. He later lined out with MTU Cork in the Fitzgibbon Cup and was named on the Team of the Year in 2025. At club level, O'Sullivan played with Ballinhassig.

At inter-county level, O'Sullivan first appeared for Cork as a member of the minor team. He was corner-back when the team won the All-Ireland MHC title after a 1–23 to 0–12 defeat of Galway in the 2021 All-Ireland MHC final. O'Sullivan immediately progressed to the under-20 team and added an All-Ireland U20HC title to his collection after lining out at corner back in the 2–22 to 3–13 defeat of Offaly in the 2023 All-Ireland U20 final.

O'Sullivan was added to the senior team in 2025 and was part of the panel when Cork won the National Hurling League title that year.

== Honours ==
Ballinhassig

- Cork Premier Intermediate Hurling Championship: 2025

Cork

- Munster Senior Hurling Championship: 2025
- National Hurling League: 2025
- All-Ireland Under-20 Hurling Championship: 2023
- Munster Under-20 Hurling Championship: 2023
- All-Ireland Minor Hurling Championship: 2021
- Munster Minor Hurling Championship: 2021

Sporting positions
Preceded by Micheál Mullins	Cork under-20 hurling team captain 2024	Succeeded by Denis Cashman
