= John Halbert (hurler) =

Irish hurler

Personal information
- Born: 1987 (age 38–39) Watergrasshill, County Cork, Ireland

Sport
- Sport: Hurling
- Position: Midfield
Clubs
- Years: Club
- Watergrasshill; Imokilly
Club titles
- Cork titles: 0
College
- Years: College
- 2005-2008: University College Cork
College titles
- Fitzgibbon titles: 0
Inter-county*
Years	County	Apps (scores)
2007	Cork	0 (0-00)
Inter-county titles
- Munster titles: 0
- All-Irelands: 0
- NHL: 0
- All Stars: 0
- *Inter County team apps and scores correct as of 17:35, 24 July 2018.

John Halbert (born 1987) is an Irish hurler who plays for club side Watergrasshill and is a former player with divisional side Imokilly and at inter-county level with the Cork senior hurling team.

== Playing career ==
=== University ===
As a member of the University College Cork senior hurling team, Halbert was a regular player in the Fitzgibbon Cup campaigns in 2007 and 2008.

=== Club ===
Halbert joined the Watergrasshill club at a young age and played in all grades at juvenile and underage levels. On 24 October 2004, he scored two points from frees when Watergrasshill defeated Dromina by 2–13 to 2–08 to win the Cork Intermediate Championship.

Halbert also lined out with divisional side Imokilly on a number of occasions.

=== Inter-county ===
==== Minor, under-21 and intermediate ====
On 1 April 2005, Halbert made his first appearance for the Cork minor hurling team, scoring two points after coming on as a substitute in Cork's Munster Championship quarter-final defeat of Kerry. On 26 June 2005, he was at left corner-forward when Cork defeated Limerick by 2–18 to 1–12 to win the Munster title.

Halbert subsequently joined the Cork under-21 hurling team, making his debut at midfield on 6 June 2007 in a 1–14 to 2-10 Munster Championship quarter-final defeat of Tipperary. On 1 August 2007, Halbert won a Munster medal following a 1–20 to 0–10 defeat of Waterford in the final.

Halbert undertook a dual role as a member of Cork's senior and intermediate hurling teams during the 2007 season. After little success in 2007 and 2008, he played no part with the intermediate team in 2009, before winning a Munster medal following a 0–15 to 0–13 defeat of Waterford in the 2010 final. On 28 August 2010, Halbert was introduced as a late substitute in Cork's All-Ireland final defeat by Kilkenny.

==== Senior ====
On 7 January 2007, Halbert made his first appearance for the Cork senior hurling team as a substitute in a 1–21 to 2–10 defeat of University College Cork in a challenge match at the Mardyke Sports Ground. He played no part in Cork's subsequent National Hurling League campaign, however, his club form earned him a call up to the Cork team as a replacement for the injured Paudie O'Sullivan for the Munster Championship. Halbert remained as an unused substitute for the championship and was released from the panel at the end of the season.

== Honours ==
Watergrasshill

- Cork Intermediate Hurling Championship (1): 2004

Cork

- Munster Intermediate Hurling Championship (1): 2010
- Munster Under-21 Hurling Championship (1): 2007
- Munster Minor Hurling Championship (1): 2005
