= William Osborne Cooper =

Australian cricketer

Personal information
- Born: 13 February 1891; North Adelaide, South Australia
- Died: 28 June 1930 (aged 39); Glenelg, South Australia
- Source: Cricinfo, 6 June 2018

William Osborne Cooper (13 February 1891 – 28 June 1930) was a military veteran, South Australian cricketer, and clerk in the shipping industry.

He played one first-class match for South Australia against New South Wales in December 1914.

Cooper also served as an officer in the 10th Infantry Battalion on the Western Front during World War I. He was awarded a Military Cross for 'conspicuous gallantry and devotion to duty'.

Cooper died age 39 on 8 Jun 1930 at Glenelg, South Australia.

== See also ==
- List of South Australian representative cricketers
