= 2013 Cork Premier Intermediate Hurling Championship =

- Dates: 1 June 2013 – 13 October 2013
- Teams: 16
- Champions: Youghal (1st title); Bill Cooper (captain); Christy Cooney (manager)
- Runners-up: Castlelyons; Ciarán McGann (captain); Kieran McGann (manager)

Tournament statistics
- Matches played: 30
- Goals scored: 78 (2.6 per match)
- Points scored: 812 (27.07 per match)
- Top scorer(s): Ronan Walsh (2-46)

The 2013 Cork Premier Intermediate Hurling Championship was the tenth staging of the Cork Premier Intermediate Hurling Championship since its establishment by the Cork County Board in 2004. The championship began on 1 June 2013 and ended on 13 October 2013.

On 5 October 2013, Ballincollig were relegated from the championship following a 1-14 to 0-16 defeat by Carrigaline.

On 13 October 2013, Youghal won the championship following a 0-11 to 0-10 defeat of Castlelyons in the final. This remains their only championship title in the grade.

Tracton's Ronan Walsh was the championship's top scorer with Ronan Walsh 2-46.

== Team changes ==
=== To Championship ===
Promoted from the Cork Intermediate Hurling Championship

- Kilworth

Relegated from the Cork Senior Hurling Championship

- Cloyne

=== From Championship ===
Promoted to the Cork Senior Hurling Championship

- Ballinhassig

Relegated to the Cork Intermediate Hurling Championship

- Aghabullogue

== Results ==
=== Round 1 ===
1 June 2013 Round 1	Newcestown	0-14 - 0-08	Blarney	Ballincollig
	E Kelly 0-6, H Curran 0-4, S Rayn 0-2, T Horgan 0-1, L Meade 0-1.		M Cremin 0-2, P O'Driscoll 0-2, J O'Regan 0-2, C Murphy 0-1, R McNamara 0-1.	Referee: N Wall (Carrigaline)

1 June 2013 Round 1	Carrigaline	5-10 - 4-17	Ballyhea	Moore Park, Kilworth
	R O'Shea 4-2, D Drake 0-4, P Mullane 1-0, N Coakley 0-2, S Corcoran 0-1, M O'Sullivan 0-1.		N Ronan 2-4, J O'Sullivan 1-3, M O'Sullivan 0-5, E Morrissey 1-0, P O'Callaghan 0-3, T Shanahan 0-1, D Copps 0-1.	Referee: D Carroll (Kanturk)

2 June 2013 Round 1	Castlelyons	0-15 - 1-07	Ballincollig	Caherlag Sportsfield, Glounthaune
	C Spillane 0-4, R Brnasfield 0-3, A O'Sullivan 0-3, A Spillane 0-2, C McGann 0-1, E Maye 0-1, M Spillane 0-1.		I Coughlan 1-0, C O'Sullivan 0-2, C Dorgan 0-2, E Ryle 0-1, C Sexton 0-1, F Hickey 0-1.	Referee: D Carroll (Kanturk)

2 June 2013 Round 1	Mallow	4-12 - 1-13	Tracton	Páirc Uí Rinn, Cork
	D Hayes 2-2, S Hayes 0-5, P Herlihy 1-1, Y Browne 1-1, C Murphy 0-2, A Sheehan 0-1.		R Walsh 0-9, M O'Sullivan 1-2, S O'Sullivan 0-2.	Referee: B Murphy (Carrigwtohill)

2 June 2013 Round 1	Inniscarra	1-14 - 2-16	Bandon	Newcestown
	T O'Connor 0-5, J Olden 1-1, D O'Connell 0-3, C Casey 0-2, J O'Callaghan 0-1, J Casey 0-1, D O'Keeffe 0-1.		D Crowley 0-9, R Crowley 1-0, A Johnson 1-0, M Sugrue 0-3, J Hickey 0-2, P Crowley 0-1, M Cahalane 0-1.	Referee: K Murphy (Nemo Rangers)

2 June 2013 Round 1	Kilworth	0-14 - 3-18	Watergrasshill	Rathcormac
	A Mannix 0-6, B Tobin 0-3, M Wade 0-1, L Whelan 0-1, N Byrne 0-1, N McNamara 0-1, D McNamara 0-1.		S O'Regan 1-11, J Halbert 1-4, P Cahill 1-0, S O'Callaghan 0-2, K O'Neill 0-1.	Referee: T O'Donovan (Douglas)

2 June 2013 Round 1	Cloyne	1-12 - 0-17	Kilbrittain	Páirc Uí Rinn, Cork
	Diarmuid O'Sullivan 1-5, K Dennehy 0-3, Donal O'Sullivan 0-2, L Cahill 0-1, C Cusack 0-1.		J Wall 0-9, M Sexton 0-4, C O'Leary 0-1, V Hickey 0-1, P O'Mahony 0-1, R Cashman 0-1.	Referee: N Wall (Carrigaline)

2 June 2013 Round 1	Youghal	3-12 - 3-14	Valley Rovers	Carrigtwohill
	Brendan Ring 0-6, B Maloney 1-1, L Desmond 1-1, D Ring 1-1, B Cooper 0-1, O Dempsey 0-1, N Roche 0-1.		E Collins 1-6, K Canty 2-2, R Butler 0-2, D Crowley 0-2, C O'Donovan 0-2.	Referee: D Daly (Brian Dillons)

=== Round 2 ===
29 June 2013 Round 2	Blarney	2-19 - 5-09 (aet)	Cloyne	Páirc Uí Rinn, Cork
	D Cremin 2-2, M Cremin 0-4, C Murphy 0-3, R McNamara 0-3, E McCarthy 0-2, P O'Driscoll 0-1, B O'Connell 0-1, C Sykes 0-1, JD Good 0-1, D O'Brien 0-1.		Diarmuid O'Sullivan 1-3, Domhnall O'Sullivan 1-2, P O'Sullivan 1-1, L Cahill 1-0, B McCarthy 1-0, D Cahill 0-3.	Referee: J Larkin (Douglas)

30 June 2013 Round 2	Ballincollig	0-13 - 1-12	Youghal	Páirc Uí Rinn, Cork
	C Dorgan 0-6, C O'Sullivan 0-4, C Moore 0-1, D Bowen 0-1, J Miskella 0-1.		B Ring 0-6, B Maloney 1-1, B Cooper 0-3, O Demspey 0-1, C Spillane 0-1.	Referee: C Murphy (Nemo Rangers)

30 June 2013 Round 2	Carrigaline	2-17 - 1-22	Kilworth	Watergrasshill
	R O'Shea 2-3, M O'Sullivan 0-3, K McIntyre 0-2, C Hurley 0-2, C McSweeney 0-2, R Keohane 0-2, P Mullane 0-1, P Ronayne 0-1, J de Puis 0-1.		A Mannix 1-13, L Whelan 0-4, J McCarthy 0-2, N Byrne 0-1, B Tobin 0-1, N McNamara 0-1.	Referee: D O'Leary (Watergrasshill)

6 July 2013 Round 2	Inniscarra	2-09 - 2-16	Tracton	Páirc Uí Rinn, Cork
	T O'Connor 0-5, C Buckley 1-0, J O'Callaghan 1-0, C Casey 0-2, J Casey 0-2.		R Walsh 2-10, F Lynch 0-1, Joe Kingston 0-1, M O'Sullivan 0-1, G Kingston 0-1, C McGuinness 0-1, T McGuinness 0-1.	Referee: B Murphy (Carrigtwohill)

=== Round 3 ===
13 July 2013 Round 3	Ballincollig	0-05 - 1-18	Inniscarra	Páirc Uí Rinn, Cork
	C Dorgan 0-4, N Purcell 0-1.		C Casey 1-4, J Casey 0-4, D O'Keeffe 0-4, T O'Connor 0-3, P Farmer 0-1, A Sheehan 0-1, C Buckley 0-1.	Referee: J Dorgan and K Murphy (Nemo Rangers)

20 July 2013 Round 3	Carrigaline	3-11 - 3-15	Cloyne	Páirc Uí Rinn, Cork
	R O'Shea 3-5, N Coakley 0-2, R Keohane 0-2, K Kavanagh 0-1, P Ronayne 0-1.		Diarmuid O'Sullivan 1-9, D Cahill 1-2, L Cahill 1-0, B Fleming 0-1, E O'Sullivan 0-1, A Walsh 0-1, Domhnall O'Sullivan 0-1.	Referee: D Copps (Ballyhea)

=== Round 4 ===
4 August 2013 Round 4	Tracton	0-15 - 0-15	Bandon	Páirc Uí Ríogáin, Ballinspittle
	R Walsh 0-7, K Lynch 0-2, G Kingston 0-2, K Kingston 0-2, S O'Sullivan 0-1, J Good 0-1.		R Crowley 0-7, J Hickey 0-3, D Crowley 0-3, M Sugrue 0-1, M Cahalane 0-1.	Referee: M Maher (St. Finbarr's)

4 August 2013 Round 4	Inniscarra	0-17 - 2-09	Blarney	Páirc Uí Rinn, Cork
	D O'Connell 0-4, T O'Connor 0-4, D O'Connell 0-3, D O'Keeffe 0-2, S O'Donoghue 0-2, A Sheehan 0-1, C Buckley 0-1.		R McNamara 1-2, C Murphy 1-2, M Cremin 0-2, P O'Driscoll 0-1, D Cremin 0-1, G Sykes 0-1.	Referee: K Murphy (Nemo Rangers)

4 August 2013 Round 4	Kilbrittain	1-10 - 0-11	Valley Rovers	Jack Barrett Park, Kinsale
	J Wall 0-7, C O'Leary 1-0, R Cashman 0-1, M Sexton 0-1, P O'Mahony 0-1.		E Collins 0-5, K Canty 0-3, R Butler 0-1, D Crowley 0-1, R O'Donovan 0-1.	Referee: D Kirwan (Éire Óg)

4 August 2013 Round 4	Kilworth	0-16 - 0-11	Ballyhea	Kildorrery
	A Mannix 0-13.		N Ronan 0-5, P O'Callaghan 0-3, M O'Sullivan 0-1, G Morrissey 0-1, E Rea 0-1.	Referee: J Birmingham (Bride Rovers)

10 August 2013 Round 4	Cloyne	2-10 - 0-16	Youghal	Clonmult Memorial Park, Midleton
	Diarmuid O'Sullivan 2-8, A Walsh 0-1, D Cahill 0-1.		Brendan Ring 0-6, L Desmond 0-5, Barry Ring 0-1, B Maloney 0-1, C O'Mahony 0-1, C Spillane 0-1, D Ring 0-1.	Referee: J Sexton (Ballyhea)

17 August 2013 Round 4	Mallow	2-09 - 3-17	Watergrasshill	Páirc Mac Gearailt, Fermoy
	A Sheehan 1-5, D Hayes 1-2, P Herlihy 0-1, F McCormack 0-1.		S O'Regan 0-9, J Halbert 1-5, E Barry 1-1, E O'Reilly 1-0, K Coakley 0-1, J Foley 0-1.	Referee: J Larkin (Douglas)

18 August 2013 Round 4 replay	Bandon	2-13 - 1-18	Tracton	Páirc Uí Ríogáin, Ballinspittle
	M Sugrue 1-5, R Crowley 0-5, A Johnson 1-0, M Cahalane 0-2, K Hurley 0-1.		R Walsh 0-10, M O'Sullivan 1-0, G Kingston 0-2, G O'Sullivan 0-2, K Lynch 0-2, T McGuinness 0-1, F Lynch 0-1.	Referee: J Dorgan (Nemo Rangers)

25 August 2013 Round 4 replay	Cloyne	2-09 - 2-14	Youghal	Clonmult Memorial Park, Midleton
	Diarmuid O'Sullivan 1-5, K Dennehy 1-0, A Walsh 0-1, P O'Sullivan 0-1, D Cahill 0-1, L Cahill 0-1.		Brendan Ring 1-4, B Cooper 1-0, O Demspey 0-3, L Desmond 0-3, J O'Mahony 0-2, D Ring 0-1, A Frahill-O'Connor 0-1.	Referee: D Daly (Brian Dillons)

=== Relegation play-off ===
5 October 2013 Play-off	Ballincollig	0-16 – 1-14	Carrigaline	Brinny Sportsfield, Brinny
	C Dorgan 0-7, D Bowen 0-5, C o'Sullivan 0-2, N Allen 0-1, J Miskella 0-1.		R O'Shea 1-4, D Drake 0-5, K Kavanagh 0-2, M O'Sullivan 0-1, S O'Brien 0-1, W O'Brien 0-1.	Referee: J Larkin (Douglas)

=== Quarter-finals ===
31 August 2013 Quarter-final	Inniscarra	0-20 – 0-16	Kilworth	Páirc Uí Rinn, Cork
	D O'Connell 0-6, C Casey 0-4, T Murphy 0-3, J Olden 0-2, T O'Connor 0-2, C Buckley 0-1, S O'Callaghan 0-1, S O'Donoghue 0-1.		A Mannix 0-7, N McNamara 0-5, B Tobin 0-2, N O'Brien 0-2.	Referee: C McAllister (Kilworth)

31 August 2013 Quarter-final	Castlelyons	0-13 – 0-11	Newcestown	Páirc Uí Rinn, Cork
	C Spillane 0-6, C Barry 0-2, C McGann 0-1, B Fitzgerald 0-1, A Spillane 0-1, A Fenton 0-1, M Spillane 0-1.		E Kelly 0-6, H Curran 0-2, D Twomey 0-2, C Keane 0-1.	Referee: M Maher (St. Finbarr's)

7 September 2013 Quarter-final	Kilbrittain	0-12 – 1-14	Watergrasshill	Páirc Uí Rinn, Cork
	J Wall 0-6, M Sexton 0-3, R Cashman 0-1, D Desmond 0-1, A Hayes 0-1.		P Cahill 1-4, K O'Neill 0-3, S O'Callaghan 0-2, J Foley 0-2, S O'Regan 0-1, W O'Leary 0-1, J Halbert 0-1.	Referee: N Wall (Carrigaline)

14 September 2013 Quarter-final	Youghal	1-18 – 1-16	Tracton	Páirc Uí Rinn, Cork
	L Desmond 0-9, A Frahill-O'Connor 1-2, B Ring 0-3, D Ring 0-2, J O'Mahony 0-2.		R Walsh 0-10, F Lynch 1-1, M O'Sullivan 0-3, K Lynch 0-1, G Kingston 0-1.	Referee: D Daly (Brian Dillons)

=== Semi-finals ===
27 September 2013 Semi-final	Inniscarra	1-07 – 4-16	Youghal	Páirc Uí Rinn, Cork
	D O'Connell 0-4, C Casey 1-0, T O'Connor 0-2, J Olden 0-1.		L Desmond 1-8, B Moloney 1-2, A Ring 1-0, Brendan Ring 0-2, J O'Mahony 0-2, Barry Ring 0-1, O Demspey 0-1.	Referee: C Lyons (Nemo Rangers)

27 September 2013 Semi-final	Castlelyons	1-19 – 1-10	Watergrasshill	Páirc Uí Rinn, Cork
	A Spillane 1-3, C Spillane 0-4, C McGann 0-3, T McCarthy 0-3, B Fitzgerald 0-2, R Bransfield 0-1, P Mahon 0-1, C Barry 0-1, A O'Sullivan 0-1.		S O'Regan 0-5, D O'Farrell 1-0, J Foley 0-3, P Cahill 0-1, K O'Neill 0-1.	Referee: D Kirwan (Éire Óg)

=== Final ===
13 October 2013 Final	Youghal	0-11 – 0-10	Castlelyons	Páirc Uí Rinn, Cork
	L Desmond (0-3, frees), C O’Mahony and Brendan Ring (0-2 each), C Spillane (65), B Cooper, A Curtin and N Roche (0-1 each).	Report	C Spillane (0-7, six frees), T McCarthy, A O’Sullivan and P Mahon (0-1 each).	Referee: J Larkin (Douglas)

== Championship statistics ==
=== Scoring events ===
- Widest winning margin: 18 points
  - Inniscarra 1-07 – 4-16 Youghal (Semi-final)
- Most goals in a match: 9
  - Carrigaline 5-10 - 4-17 Ballyhea (Round 1)
- Most points in a match: 39
  - Carrigaline 2-17 - 1-22 Kilworth (Round 2)
- Most goals by one team in a match: 5
  - Carrigaline 5-10 - 4-17 Ballyhea (Round 1)
  - Cloyne 5-09 – 2-19 Blarney (Round 2)
- Most goals scored by a losing team: 5
  - Cloyne 5-09 – 2-19 Blarney (Round 2)
- Most points scored by a losing team: 17
  - Carrigaline 2-17 - 1-22 Kilworth (Round 2)

=== Top scorers ===
Top scorer overall

Rank	Player	Club	Tally	Total	Matches	Average
1	Ronan Walsh	Tracton	2-46	52	5	10.40
2	Diarmuid O'Sullivan	Cloyne	6-30	48	5	9.60
3	Rob O'Shea	Carrigaline	10-14	44	4	11.00
4	Adrian Mannix	Kilworth	1-39	42	4	10.50
5	Leigh Desmond	Youghal	2-29	35	6	5.83
6	Brendan Ring	Youghal	1-26	29	6	4.83
6	Shane O'Regan	Watergrasshill	1-26	29	4	7.25
7	Jamie Wall	Kilbrittain	0-22	22	3	7.33
8	Tomás O'Connor	Inniscarra	0-21	21	6	3.50
8	Colm Spillane	Castlelyons	0-21	21	4	5.25

Top scorers in a single game

Rank	Player	Club	Tally	Total	Opposition
1	Ronan Walsh	Tracton	2-10	16	Inniscarra
1	Adrian Mannix	Kilworth	1-13	16	Carrigaline
2	Rob O'Shea	Carrigaline	4-02	14	Ballyhea
2	Rob O'Shea	Carrigaline	3-05	14	Cloyne
2	Diarmuid O'Sullivan	Cloyne	2-08	14	Youghal
2	Shane O'Regan	Watergrasshill	1-11	14	Kilworth
3	Adrian Mannix	Kilworth	0-13	13	Ballyhea
4	Diarmuid O'Sullivan	Cloyne	1-09	12	Carrigaline
5	Leigh Desmond	Youghal	1-08	11	Inniscarra
6	Neil Ronan	Ballyhea	2-04	10	Carrigaline
6	Ronan Walsh	Tracton	0-10	10	Bandon
6	Ronan Walsh	Tracton	0-10	10	Youghal
