= 2011 Cork Premier Intermediate Hurling Championship =

- Dates: 27 May 2011 – 9 October 2011
- Teams: 16
- Champions: Courcey Rovers (1st title); Séamus Hayes (captain); Diarmuid Corcoran (manager)
- Runners-up: Youghal; Peter Queally (manager)
- Relegated: Argideen Rangers

Tournament statistics
- Matches played: 32
- Goals scored: 68 (2.13 per match)
- Points scored: 855 (26.72 per match)
- Top scorer(s): Éamonn Collins (6-33)

The 2011 Cork Premier Intermediate Hurling Championship was the eighth staging of the Cork Premier Intermediate Hurling Championship since its establishment by the Cork County Board in 2004.

On 28 August 2011, Argideen Rangers were relegated from the championship following a 1-17 to 1-12 defeat by Watergrasshill.

On 9 October 2011, Courcey Rovers won the championship following a 0-15 to 1-9 defeat of Youghal in the final. It remains their only championship title in this grade.

Éamonn Collins from the Valley Rovers club was the championship's top scorer with 6-33.

== Teams ==
A total of 16 teams contested the Premier Intermediate Championship, including 14 teams from the 2010 premier intermediate championship, one relegated from the 2010 senior championship and one promoted from the 2010 intermediate championship.

== Team changes ==
=== To Championship ===
Promoted from the Cork Intermediate Hurling Championship

- Meelin

Relegated from the Cork Senior Hurling Championship

- Blarney

=== From Championship ===
Promoted to the Cork Senior Hurling Championship

- Ballymartle

Relegated to the Cork Intermediate Hurling Championship

- Fr. O’Neill’s

== Results ==
=== Round 1 ===
27 May 2011 Round 1	Inniscarra	2-10 - 0-27	Courcey Rovers	Páirc Uí Rinn, Cork
	A O'Mahony 2-5, M Coleman 0-3, D O'Connell 0-2.		D Lordan 0-11, S Hayes 0-8, N Murphy 0-4, K Moloney 0-2, J Murphy 0-1, G Minihane 0-1.	Referee: C Lyons (Nemo Rangers)

27 May 2011 Round 1	Carrigaline	2-16 - 1-13	Mallow	Blarney
	T Murphy 1-3, R Keohane 1-3, R O'Shea 0-6, S O'Brien 0-3, D Drake 0-1.		A Sheehan 1-10, J Curtin 0-1, M Maher 0-1, T O'Riordan 0-1.	Referee: D Kirwan (Éire Óg)

28 May 2011 Round 1	Ballincollig	2-20 - 1-22 (aet)	Youghal	Riverstown
	R O'Doherty 1-10, C Sexton 0-4, R O'Driscoll 1-0, C Harris 0-1, L Jennings 0-1, C O'Sullivan 0-1, N Allen 0-1, D Bowen 0-1, E Ryle 0-1.		Brendan Ring 0-11, B Cooper 1-4, B Moloney 0-4, A Curtin 0-2, Barry Ring 0-1.	Referee: M O'Mahony (Kilbrittain)

3 June 2011 Round 1	Ballyhea	1-09 - 1-21	Newcestown	Ballincollig
	M O'Sullivan 0-6, D Copps 1-0, K Hanley 0-1, J O'Sullivan 0-1, G Morrissey 0-1.		E Kelly 0-10, C Keane 1-1, D Twomey 0-2, S Ryan 0-2, H Curran 0-2, K Long 0-1, B Horgan 0-1, G O'Driscoll 0-1, T Twomey 0-1.	Referee: P Downey (Inniscarra)

4 June 2011 Round 1	Aghabullogue	0-15 - 1-09	Kilbrittain	Newcestown
	P Finnegan 0-12, D Twomey 0-3.		R Cashman 1-2, M Sexton 0-5, J Wall 0-1, C Hickey 0-1.	Referee: B Coniry (Crosshaven)

4 June 2011 Round 1	Blarney	0-15 - 0-12	Valley Rovers	Liam MacCarthy Park, B'garvan
	M Cremin 0-6, R McNamara 0-3, B O'Connell 0-2, B Hurley 0-1, C Murphy 0-1, J O'Regan 0-1, J Hughes 0-1.		E Collins 0-7, M O'Brien 0-2, R Butler 0-1, D Crowley 0-1, J Hurley 0-1.	Referee: D O'Leary (Watergrasshill)

4 June 2011 Round 1	Argideen Rangers	1-11 - 2-15	Castlelyons	Páirc Uí Rinn, Cork
	M Walsh 1-3, JM O'Callaghan 0-6, M O'Callaghan 0-2.		M Spillane 0-7, T McCarthy 0-5, R Feeney 1-0, C McGann 1-0, P Murphy 0-2, B Fitzgerald 0-1.	Referee: J Dorgan (Nemo Rangers)

5 June 2011 Round 1	Watergrasshill	0-15 - 1-13	Tracton	Caherlag
	P O'Regan 0-5, J Halbert 0-4, P Cahill 0-2, K Coakley 0-2, J Foley 0-1, D McCarthy 0-1.		R Walsh 1-6, S O'Sullivan 0-3, M O'Sullivan 0-2, K Lynch 0-2.	Referee: C Lane (Banteer)

=== Round 2 ===
17 June 2011 Round 2	Valley Rovers	0-13 - 3-08	Ballyhea	Páirc Uí Rinn, Cork
	E Collins 0-7, J Hurley 0-1, D Murphy 0-1, R O'Donovan 0-1, B Lehane 0-1, T Burke 0-1, E Manning 0-1.		M O'Sullivan 0-5, G Morrissey 1-0, D Copps 1-0, E Morrissey 1-0, J O'Sullivan 0-2, K Hanley 0-1.	Referee: C Lyons (Nemo Rangers)

19 June 2011 Round 2	Mallow	2-14 - 2-09	Argideen Rangers	Páirc Uí Rinn, Cork
	A Sheehan 0-5, D hayes 1-2, J Hayes 1-1, T O'Riordan 0-3, P Herlihy 0-2, M Maher 0-1.		JM O'Callaghan 1-4, B Hennessy 1-1, N Coomey 0-1, M Walsh 0-1, F Butler 0-1, P Butler 0-1.	Referee: G O'Connell (Lisgoold)

26 June 2011 Round 2	Kilbrittain	1-21 - 0-22	Inniscarra	Cloughduv
	J Wall 1-4, R Cashman 0-5, M Sexton 0-5, A Hayes 0-3, N Quinlan 0-1, J Deasy 0-1, V O'Brien 0-1, David Desmond 0-1.		A O'Mahony 0-7, M Coleman 0-4, D O'Connell 0-3, C Casey 0-2, S O'Callaghan 0-2, T Murphy 0-1, A Sheehan 0-1, L O'Brien 0-1, J Casey 0-1.	Referee: D O'Leary (Watergrasshill)

30 June 2011 Round 2	Youghal	2-12 - 2-09	Watergrasshill	St. Catherine's Park, Ballynoe
	Brendan Ring 0-6, L Desmond 1-1, R Cunningham 1-0, B Cooper 0-3, B Moloney 0-1, A Curtin 0-1.		J Halbert 1-3, J Foley 1-0, P O'Regan 0-3, S O'Callaghan 0-2, E Barry 0-1.	Referee: D Kirwan (Éire Óg)

=== Round 3 ===
2 July 2011 Round 3	Argideen Rangers	2-08 - 1-12	Inniscarra	Newcestown
	B Hennessy 1-2, A O'Leary 1-0, JM O'Callaghan 0-3, J Sheehan 0-2, M Walsh 0-1.		A O'Mahony 0-7, S O'Callaghan 1-0, D O'Connell 0-3, J Casey 0-1, C Casey 0-1.	Referee: J Bermingham (Bride Rovers)

17 July 2011 Round 3	Watergrasshill	0-18 - 1-15	Valley Rovers	Páirc Uí Rinn, Cork
	J Halbert 0-5, P Cahill 0-3, P O'Regan 0-3, A Cronin 0-2, P Cronin 0-2, S O'Regan 0-1, N O'Riordan 0-1, J Foley 0-1.		E Collins 1-7, R O'Donovan 0-3, E Manning 0-2, T Burke 0-1, D Coughlan 0-1, B Lehane 0-1.	Referee: J Dorgan (Nemo Rangers)

24 July 2011 Round 3 replay	Watergrasshill	1-14 - 2-18	Valley Rovers	Páirc Uí Rinn, Cork
	S O'Callaghan 1-2, J Halbert 0-4, N O'Riordan 0-3, P O'Regan 0-2, K Coakley 0-2, P Cronin 0-1.		E Collins 1-6, J Hurley 0-4, S O'Sulliivan 1-0, R Butler 0-2, J Burke 0-2, B Lehane 0-2, E Manning 0-1, R O'Donovan 0-1.	Referee: P Downey (Inniscarra)

=== Relegation play-off ===
28 August 2011 Play-off	Argideen Rangers	1-12 - 1-17	Watergrasshill	Ballinhassig
	JM O'Callaghan 0-7, B Hennessy 1-3, M O'Callaghan 0-1, N Coomey 0-1.		J Halbert 1-7, P O'Regan 0-5, S O'Callaghan 0-2, E O'Reilly 0-2, K Coakley 0-1.	Referee: M Moynihan (Grenagh)

=== Round 4 ===
23 July 2011 Round 4	Castlleyons	1-04 - 0-08	Courcey Rovers	Páirc Uí Rinn, Cork
	R Feeney 1-0, D Tobin 0-2, T McCarthy 0-1, C McGann 0-1.		D Lordan 0-4, S Hayes 0-2, N Murphy 0-1, G Minihane 0-1.	Referee: D Kirwan (Éire Óg)

24 July 2011 Round 4	Youghal	0-16 - 0-09	Tracton	Riverstown
	B Ring 0-11, L Desmond 0-2, B Coleman 0-2, B Moloney 0-1.		R Walsh 0-4, J Kingston 0-1, C Loren 0-1, S O'Sullivan 0-1, M O'Sullivan 0-1, F Lynch 0-1.	Referee: M O'Mahony (Kilbrittain)

30 July 2011 Round 4	Mallow	1-08 - 1-10	Blarney	Páirc Eoin Mhic Charthaigh, Donoughmore
	A Sheehan 0-7, K McCarthy 1-0, J Hayes 0-1.		J Hurley 1-0, B O'Connell 0-3, R McNamara 0-3, E McCarthy 0-1, B Hurley 0-1, E O'Connor 0-1, M Cremin 0-1.	Referee: D O'Leary (Watergrasshill)

31 July 2011 Round 4	Ballincollig	0-10 - 0-11	Newcestown	Cloughduv
	E O'Hegarty 0-6, S O'Brien 0-2, E Ryle 0-1, R O'Driscoll 0-1.		E Kelly 0-9, B Horgan 0-1, G O'Rourke 0-1.	Referee: J Bermingham (Bride Rovers)

7 August 2011 Round 4	Carrigaline	3-20 - 1-13	Ballyhea	Blarney
	R O'Shea 0-9, B O'Keeffe 1-2, D Drake 0-5, R Keohane 1-1, P Murphy 1-0, K Kavanagh 0-2, C Hurley 0-1.		M O'Sullivan 1-8, J Morrissey 0-2, K Hanley 0-2, K Morrissey 0-1.	Referee: G O'Connell (Lisgoold)

13 August 2011 Round 4	Valley Rovers	2-14 - 1-13	Inniscarra	Ballincollig
	E Collins 1-5, E Manning 1-5, S O'Sullivan 0-2, M O'Brien 0-1, T Burke 0-1.		A O'Mahony 0-6, S O'Callaghan 1-0, C Casey 0-3, A Sheehan 0-1, M Coleman 0-1, L O'Brien 0-1, T O'Regan 0-1.	Referee: D O'Leary (Watergrasshill)

=== Quarter-finals ===
7 August 2011 Quarter-final	Kilbrittain	0-16 - 1-13	Aghabullogue	Páirc Uí Rinn, Cork
	M Sexton 0-10, R Cashman 0-3, D Desmond 0-1, D Hickey 0-1, A Hayes 0-1.		P Finnegan 1-7, J Buckley 0-2, J Kelleher 0-1, D Quinlan 0-1, P Twomey 0-1, D Twomey 0-1.	Referee: C McAllister (Aghada)

14 August 2011 Quarter-final	Courcey Rovers	1-17 - 2-14	Carrigaline	Páirc Uí Chaoimh, Cork
	N Murphy 1-4, D Lordan 0-7, S Hayes 0-1, S Holland 0-1, O Gately 0-1, S Hayes 0-1, D Murphy 0-1, G Minihane 0-1.		R O'Shea 0-8, R Keohane 1-1, D Drake 0-4, N Murphy 1-0, S O'Brien 0-1.	Referee: J Bermingham (Bride Rovers)

20 August 2011 Quarter-final replay	Aghabullogue	0-05 - 5-15	Kilbrittain	Páirc Uí Rinn, Cork
	P Finnegan 0-2, J Corkery 0-2, J Buckley 0-1.		A Hayes 4-0, M Sexton 0-6, David Desmond 0-4, O Sexton 1-0, J Wall 0-2, T Harrington 0-1, P Ryan 0-1, R Cashman 0-1.	Referee: J Bermingham (Bride Rovers)

21 August 2011 Quarter-final	Youghal	0-19 - 3-06	Valley Rovers	Páirc Uí Rinn, Cork
	Brendan Ring 0-7, L Desmond 0-5, B Cooper 0-3, J O'Mahony 0-1, A Curtin 0-1, C O'Mahony 0-1, D Ring 0-1.		E Collins 3-1, R Butler 0-2, E Manning 0-1, R O'Donovan 0-1, J Hurley 0-1.	Referee: P Downey (Inniscarra)

28 August 2011 Quarter-final	Blarney	1-14 - 1-15	Newcestown	Páirc Uí Chaoimh, Cork
	E O'Connor 1-1, B O'Connell 0-4, M Cremin 0-4, J Hughes 0-4, R McNamara 0-1.		E Kelly 0-10, T Twomey 1-0, B Horgan 0-1, D Twomey 0-1, G O'Rourke 0-1, S Ryan 0-1, C Keane 0-1.	Referee: J Dorgan (Nemo Rangers)

28 August 2011 Quarter-final replay	Courcey Rovers	0-17 - 0-12	Carrigaline	Páirc Uí Rinn, Cork
	D Lordan 0-11, S Lordan 0-3, N Murphy 0-2, S Holland 0-1.		R O'Shea 0-3, D Drake 0-2, B O'Keeffe 0-1, P Murphy 0-1, S O'Brien 0-1, R Keohane 0-1, J Moran 0-1, P Ronayne 0-1, K Kavanagh 0-1.	Referee: D Copps (Ballyhea)

=== Semi-finals ===
17 September 2011 Semi-final	Newcestown	2-09 - 1-12	Youghal	Páirc Uí Rinn, Cork
	E Kelly 2-3, F Keane 0-2, H Curran 0-2, C Keane 0-1, M Bradfield 0-1.		B Ring 0-5, L Desmond 1-0, A Curtin 0-3, D Ring 0-1, B Cooper 0-1, B Moloney 0-1, B Coleman 0-1.	Referee: C Lyons (Nemo Rangers)

17 September 2011 Semi-final	Courcey Rovers	0-14 - 0-12	Kilbrittain	Páirc Uí Rinn, Cork
	D Lordan 0-5, N Murphy 0-3, S Hayes 0-2, S Lordan 0-2, K Moloney 0-1, D Hayes 0-1.		M Sexton 0-5, A Hayes 0-3, R Cashman 0-2, D Hickey 0-1, O Sexton 0-1.	Referee: D Kirwan (Éire Óg)

1 October 2011 Semi-final replay	Youghal	2-12 - 2-07	Newcestown	Páirc Uí Rinn, Cork
	B Ring 0-7, L Desmond 1-2, B Cooper 1-0, B Coleman 0-1, B Moloney 0-1, J Ormonde 0-1.		E Kelly 0-5, F Keane 1-1, O Keane 1-0, H Curran 0-1.	Referee: D Copps (Ballyhea)

=== Final ===
9 October 2011 Final	Courcey Rovers	0-15 – 1-10	Youghal	Páirc Uí Rinn, Cork
	D Lordan 0-5, S Lordan 0-3, S Hayes 0-2, D Murphy 0-1, D Hayes 0-1, N Murphy 0-1, V Hurley 0-1, C Lordan 0-1.	Report	L Desmond 1-4, B Ring 0-2, J O'Mahony 0-1, A Curtin 0-1, B Coleman 0-1, B Cooper 0-1.	Attendance: 5,066; Referee: J Sexton (Ballyhea)

== Championship statistics ==
=== Scoring events ===
- Widest winning margin: 25 points
  - Kilbrittain 5-15 – 0-05 Aghabullogue (Quarter-final replay)
- Most goals in a match: 5
  - Kilbrittain 5-15 – 0-05 Aghabullogue (Quarter-final replay)
- Most points in a match: 48
  - Ballincollig 2-20 – 1-22 Youghal (Round 1)
- Most goals by one team in a match: 5
  - Kilbrittain 5-15 – 0-05 Aghabullogue (Quarter-final replay)
- Most goals scored by a losing team: 3
  - Valley Rovers 3-06 – 0-19 Youghal (Quarter-final)
- Most points scored by a losing team: 22
  - Youghal 1-22 – 2-20 Ballincollig (Round 1)
  - Inniscarra 0-22 – 1-21 Kilbrittain (Round 2)

=== Top scorers ===
Top scorer overall

Rank	Player	Club	Tally	Total	Matches	Average
1	Éamonn Collins	Valley Rovers	6-33	51	6	8.50
2	Brendan Ring	Youghal	0-49	49	7	7.00
3	Eoin Kelly	Newcestown	2-37	43	5	8.60
3	Daire Lordan	Mallow	0-43	43	6	7.16
4	Aidan O'Mahony	Inniscarra	2-25	31	4	7.75
4	Maurice Sexton	Kilbrittain	0-31	31	5	6.20
5	John Halbert	Watergrasshill	2-23	29	5	5.80
6	Leigh Desmond	Youghal	4-14	26	6	4.33
6	Rob O'Shea	Carrigaline	0-26	26	4	6.50
7	Pa Finnegan	Aghabullogue	1-21	24	3	8.00

Top scorers in a single game

Rank	Player	Club	Tally	Total	Opposition
1	Aaron Sheehan	Mallow	1-10	13	Carrigaline
1	Rory O'Doherty	Ballincollig	1-10	13	Youghal
2	Alan Hayes	Kilbrittain	4-00	12	Aghabullogue
2	Pa Finnegan	Aghabullogue	0-12	12	Kilbrittain
3	Aidan O'Mahony	Inniscarra	2-05	11	Courcey Rovers
3	Daire Lordan	Courcey Rovers	0-11	11	Inniscarra
3	Brendan Ring	Youghal	0-11	11	Ballincollig
3	Daire Lordan	Courcey Rovers	0-11	11	Carrigaline
3	Brendan Ring	Youghal	0-11	11	Tracton
4	Éamonn Collins	Valley Rovers	3-01	10	Youghal
4	Éamonn Collins	Valley Rovers	1-07	10	Watergrasshill
4	John Halbert	Watergrasshill	1-07	10	Argideen Rangers
4	Pa Finnegan	Aghabullogue	1-07	10	Kilbrittain
4	Eoin Kelly	Newcestown	0-10	10	Ballyhea
4	Maurice Sexton	Kilbrittain	0-10	10	Aghabullogue
4	Eoin Kelly	Newcestown	0-10	10	Blarney
