= 2010 Cork Premier Intermediate Hurling Championship =

- Dates: 4 June 2010 – 10 October 2010
- Teams: 16
- Champions: Ballymartle (1st title); Patrick Dwyer (captain); Anthony McCarthy (manager)
- Runners-up: Tracton; Seán O'Sullivan (captain); Kieran Kingston (manager)
- Relegated: Fr. O’Neill’s

Tournament statistics
- Matches played: 30
- Top scorer(s): Ronan Walsh (2-57)

The 2010 Cork Premier Intermediate Hurling Championship was the seventh staging of the Cork Premier Intermediate Hurling Championship since its establishment by the Cork County Board in 2004. The championship began on 4 June 2010 and ended on 10 October 2010.

On 30 July 2010, Fr. O’Neill’s were relegated from the championship following a 1-15 to 0-10 defeat by Aghabullogue.

On 10 October 2010, Ballymartle won the championship following a 2-14 to 0-13 defeat of Tracton in the final. It remains their only championship title in this grade.

Tracton's Ronan Walsh was the championship's top scorer with 2-57. It remains a record cumulative score for a player in a single championship.

== Teams ==
A total of 16 teams contested the Premier Intermediate Championship, including 14 teams from the 2009 premier intermediate championship, one relegated from the 2009 senior championship and one promoted from the 2009 intermediate championship.

== Team changes ==
=== To Championship ===
Promoted from the Cork Intermediate Hurling Championship

- Fermoy

Relegated from the Cork Senior Hurling Championship

- Castlelyons

=== From Championship ===
Promoted to the Cork Senior Hurling Championship

- Douglas

Relegated to the Cork Intermediate Hurling Championship

- St. Catherine’s

== Results ==
=== Round 1 ===
4 June 2010 Round 1	Valley Rovers	1-12 - 1-14	Inniscarra	Páirc Uí Rinn, Cork
	R O'Donovan 0-7, S O'Sullivan 1-0, T Burke 0-3, E Manning 0-1, J Crowley 0-1.		C Casey 1-2, D O'Connell 0-4, N O'Regan 0-3, S O'Mahony 0-2, M Coleman 0-2, D Lynch 0-1.	Referee: D O'Flynn (Fr. O'Neill's)

4 June 2010 Round 1	Castlelyons	0-09 - 1-19	Mallow	Ballyhooley
	P Murphy 0-3, M Spillane 0-3, L Sexton 0-1, D Tobin 0-1, B Fitzgerald 0-1.		C Murphy 0-10, C O'Riordan 1-1, J Hayes 0-3, P Dineen 0-2, D Coughlan 0-1, B Carey 0-1, K Sheehan 0-1.	Referee: W Sheehy (Newcestown)

5 June 2010 Round 1	Argideen Rangers	1-11 - 1-05	Courcey Rovers	Kilbrittain
	R O'Sullivan 1-2, M Walsh 0-3, JM O'Callaghan 0-2, S O'Mahony 0-2, M O'Callaghan 0-2.		J Murphy 1-0, N Murphy 0-2, K Moloney 0-1, S Hayes 0-1, G Moloney 0-1.	Referee: P Downey (Inniscarra)

5 June 2010 Round 1	Ballymartle	3-16 - 0-15	Tracton	Shanbally
	J Dwyer 1-2, D McCarthy 1-2, D Dwyer 1-2, R Dwyer 0-2, B Dwyer 0-2, B Corry 0-2, S Corry 0-2, S O'Mahony 0-2.		R Walsh 0-9, C Lordan 0-3, P Kingston 0-1, J Kingston 0-1, K Corrigan 0-1.	Referee: M O'Mahony (Kilbrittain)

5 June 2010 Round 1	Watergrasshill	0-06 - 3-11	Youghal	Killeagh
	P Cahill 0-2, K Coakley 0-2, W O'Leary 0-1, J Halbert 0-1.		B Cooper 2-1, Brendan Ring 1-2, D Ring 0-3, N Roche 0-2, Barry Ring 0-1, B Coleman 0-1, C Spillane 0-1.	Referee: K Murphy (Nemo Rangers)

5 June 2010 Round 1	Ballyhea	1-09 - 1-13	Newcestown	Mallow GAA Complex, Mallow
	N Ronan 1-5, M O'Sullivan 0-2, I Ronan 0-1, L O'Connor 0-1.		F Keane 1-5, E Kelly 0-6, T Twomey 0-1, N O'Sullivan 0-1.	Referee: C Lane (Banteer)

18 June 2010 Round 1	Carrigaline	1-16 - 0-16	Fr. O'Neill's	Páirc Séamus de Barra, Carrigtwohill
	S O'Brien 1-5, J Moran 0-4, S Corcoran 0-2, T Murphy 0-1, P Murphy 0-1, D Drake 0-1, W O'Brien 0-1, R Keoghan 0-1.		E Conway 0-8, E McCarthy 0-3, P Butler 0-1, K Wall 0-1, A Hayes 0-1, G Holland 0-1, E Holland 0-1.	Referee: P Downey (Inniscarra)

27 June 2010 Round 1	Ballincollig	0-21 - 2-12	Aghabullogue	Cloughduv
	J Dwyer 0-7, A O'Donovan 0-4, R O'Doherty 0-3, R Ryan 0-3, J O'Brien 0-2, F Hickey 0-1, J Miskella 0-1.		P Finnegan 1-4, J Kelleher 1-1, K Finnegan 0-3, N Buckley 0-2, M Twomey 0-1, J Buckley 0-1.	Referee: D O'Leary (Watergrasshill)

=== Round 2 ===
27 June 2010 Round 2	Ballyhea	0-18 - 1-11	Fr. O'Neill's	Mallow GAA Complex, Mallow
	N Ronan 0-6, M O'Sullivan 0-5, J O'Sullivan 0-4, K Morrissey 0-1, G Morrissey 0-1, A Crowley 0-1.		N O'Driscoll 1-0, A Hayes 0-3, E Conway 0-3, E McCarthy 0-2, B Murphy 0-1, E Holland 0-1, M Lawton 0-1.	Referee: K Murphy (Nemo Rangers)

27 June 2010 Round 2	Castlelyons	2-17 - 0-26 (aet)	Watergrasshill	Rathcormac
	M Spillane 1-3, T McCarthy 0-6, E Maye 1-0, B Fitzgerald 0-3, P Murphy 0-2, D Wallace 0-1, D Tobin 0-1, B Carroll 0-1.		P O'Regan 0-11, P Cahill 0-4, P O'Brien 0-4, E Enright 0-3, J Halbert 0-3, W O'Leary 0-1.	Referee: C Lane (Banteer)

3 July 2010 Round 2	Tracton	1-22 - 2-16 (aet)	Aghabullogue	Brinny
	R Walsh 0-13, M O'Sullivan 1-4, J Kingston 0-3, C Lordan 0-1, K Lynch 0-1.		P Finnegan 2-3, K Finnegan 0-7, J Corkery 0-3, N Buckley 0-1, J Kelleher 0-1, J Buckley 0-1.	Referee: G O'Connell (Lisgoold)

4 July 2010 Round 2	Valley Rovers	1-12 - 1-11	Courcey Rovers	Minane Bridge
	R O'Donovan 0-6, B Lehane 1-1, K Canty 0-3, K Hurley 0-2.		C Lordan 1-2, D Lordan 0-5, S Hayes 0-1, V Hurley 0-1, G Moloney 0-1, N Murphy 0-1.	Referee: D Kirwan (Éire Óg)

=== Round 3 ===
4 July 2010 Round 3	Fr. O'Neill's	0-14 - 0-15	Castlelyons	St. Catherine's Park, Ballynoe
	E Conway 0-8, G O'Leary 0-3, J Ryan 0-2, P Butler 0-1.		T McCarthy 0-6, B Fitzgerald 0-3, M Spillane 0-2, E Maye 0-2, D Tobin 0-1, L Sexton 0-1.	Referee: C Lane (Banteer)

12 July 2010 Round 3	Aghabullogue	1-13 - 4-19	Courcey Rovers	Brinny
	P Finnegan 1-8, J Corkery 0-3, N Buckley 0-1, K Finnegan 0-1.		S Hayes 1-2, G Moloney 1-2, D Lordan 0-5, N Murphy 0-5, J Murphy 1-1, S Lordan 0-2, D Hayes 0-1, B Hayes 0-1.	Referee: C Lyons (Nemo Rangers)

=== Relegation play-off ===
30 July 2010 Play-off	Aghabullogue	1-15 - 0-10	Fr. O'Neill's	Riverstown
	J Corkery 1-2, J Buckley 0-4, P Finnegan 0-3, K Finnegan 0-3, M Dennehy 0-2, K Wall 0-1.		G O'Leary 0-6, E Conway 0-2, J Ryan 0-1, B Murphy 0-1.	Referee: J Dorgan (Nemo Rangers)

=== Round 4 ===
23 July 2010 Round 4	Valley Rovers	3-08 - 1-13	Ballyhea	Mallow GAA Complex, Mallow
	R O'Donovan 1-4, B Lehane 1-1, T Burke 1-0, R Butler 0-2, K Canty 0-1.		N Ronan 0-8, E Rea 1-1, M O'Sullivan 0-3, I Ronan 0-1.	Referee: D O'Leary (Watergrasshill)

24 July 2010 Round 4	Castlelyons	1-14 - 1-14	Courcey Rovers	Páirc Uí Rinn, Cork
	M Spillane 0-6, C McGann 1-0, D Tobin 0-3, T McCarthy 0-3, B Fitzgerald 0-1, L Sexton 0-1.		S Hayes 1-4, D Lordan 0-4, N Murphy 0-2, G Moloney 0-2, J Murphy 0-1, V Hurley 0-1.	Referee: J Dorgan (Nemo Rangers)

24 July 2010 Round 4	Inniscarra	3-18 - 2-09	Mallow	Páirc Uí Rinn, Cork
	N O'Regan 0-10, D O'Connell 1-3, C Casey 1-1, F Olden 1-0, J Olden 0-2, C Buckley 0-1, W Ryan 0-1.		C Murphy 0-4, B Carey 1-0, D Kerrisk 1-0, C O'Riordan 0-3, C Moloney 0-2.	Referee: E Sheehy (Newcestown)

25 July 2010 Round 4	Carrigaline	0-13 - 0-17	Youghal	Riverstown
	R O'Shea 0-4, S O'Brien 0-3, W O'Brien 0-1, D Drake 0-1, T Murphy 0-1, C Neville 0-1, S Corcoran 0-1, E O'Keeffe 0-1.		Brendan Ring 0-6, B Coleman 0-3, A Curtin 0-2, Barry Ring 0-1, N Roche 0-1, C O'Mahony 0-1, B Cooper 0-1, D Ring 0-1, J O'Mahony 0-1.	Referee: D O'Leary (Cloighduv)

25 July 2010 Round 4	Tracton	0-18 - 0-09	Watergrasshill	Páirc Uí Rinn, Cork
	R Walsh 0-10, J Kingston 0-4, S O'Sullivan 0-1, P Kingston 0-1, M O'Sullivan 0-1, K Lynch 0-1.		P O'Regan 0-4, P Cahill 0-3, P O'Brien 0-1, J Halbert 0-1.	Referee: D Copps (Ballyhea)

1 August 2010 Round 4 replay	Castlelyons	0-11 - 2-14	Courcey Rovers	Páirc Uí Rinn, Cork
	M Spillane 0-8, R Feeney 0-2, T McCarthy 0-1.		S Hayes 1-3, D Lordan 0-4, J Murphy 1-0, N Murphy 0-3, G Moloney 0-2, V Hurley 0-2.	Referee: E Sheehy (Newcestown)

2 August 2010 Round 4	Argideen Rangers	3-08 - 0-11	Ballincollig	Ballinhassig
	M Walsh 2-0, JM O'Callaghan 0-5, A O'Leary 1-0, J Sheehan 0-2, B Harte 0-1.		A O'Donovan 0-4, J Dwyer 0-3, J O'Brien 0-2, R Doherty 0-1, R Ryan 0-1.	Referee: N Barrett (Carrigtwohill)

=== Quarter-finals ===
7 August 2010 Quarter-final	Inniscarra	2-09 - 2-18	Youghal	Páirc Uí Rinn, Cork
	D O'Connell 1-1, N O'Regan 0-4, J Olden 1-0, F Olden 0-1, T Murphy 0-1, M Coleman 0-1, S O'Mahony 0-1.		B Ring 0-6, J O'Mahony 1-2, C O'Mahony 1-2, B Cooper 0-3, SD Ring 0-2, B Coleman 0-1, N Roche 0-1, B Moloney 0-1.	Referee: M O'Mahony (Kilbrittain)

7 August 2010 Quarter-final	Argideen Rangers	1-12 - 2-12	Tracton	Jack Barrett Park, Kinsale
	M Walsh 1-2, S O'Mahony 0-4, J Murphy 0-2, J Sheehan 0-1, B Hennessy 0-1, N Coomey 0-1, R O'Sullivan 0-1.		R Walsh 1-6, M O'Sullivan 1-2, S O'Sullivan 0-2, J Kingston 0-1, F Lynch 0-1.	Referee: J Dorgan (Nemo Rangers)

14 August 2010 Quarter-final	Newcestown	0-15 - 0-17	Ballymartle	Páirc Uí Ríogáin, Ballinspittle
	D Twomey 0-5, O Kelly 0-5, G O'Rourke 0-2, F Keane 0-1, M Bradfield 0-1, B Moloney 0-1.		B Dwyer 0-9, B Corry 0-3, R Dwyer 0-2, D McCarthy 0-2, S Corry 0-1.	Referee: G O'Connell (Inniscarra)

15 August 2010 Quarter-final	Courcey Rovers	2-12 - 0-13	Valley Rovers	Jack Barrett Park, Kinsale
	S Hayes 2-2, N Murphy 0-5, D Lordan 0-2, G Moloney 0-1, V Hurley 0-1, C Lordan 0-1.		R O'Donovan 0-5, J Hurley 0-4, B Lehane 0-2, K Canty 0-1, R Butler 0-1.	Referee: D O'Leary (Watergrasshill)

=== Semi-finals ===
3 September 2010 Semi-final	Ballymartle	1-17 - 3-08	Courcey Rovers	Minane Bridge
	B Dwyer 0-7 (six frees); Darren McCarthy 1-2 (one free); B Corry, R Dwyer, Dan Dwyer 0-2 each; J Dwyer, S Corry 0-1 each.	Report	J Murphy (K), S Hayes 1-1 each; N Murphy 0-4 (three frees, one ‘65); C Lordan 1-0; G Moloney, Dara Lordan (one free) 0-1 each.	Referee: D Copps (Ballyhea)

12 September 2010 Semi-final	Tracton	1-12 - 1-12	Youghal	Páirc Uí Chaoimh, Cork
	R Walsh 1-5 (1-0 pen, four frees); J Kingston 0-3, M O’Sullivan, S O’Sullivan 0-2 each.	Report	Brendan Ring 0-7 (0-6 fs); B Cooper 1-2; D Ring, Barry Ring, C O’Mahony 0-1 each.	Referee: K Murphy (Nemo Rangers)

25 September 2010 Semi-final replay	Tracton	0-22 - 0-13 (aet)	Youghal	Páirc Uí Rinn, Cork
	R Walsh 0-7, Joe Kingston 0-4, T McGuinness 0-3, M O'Sullivan 0-2, S O'Sullivan 0-2, K Lynch 0-2, F Lynch 0-2.		B Ring 0-7, B Cooper 0-3, J O'Mahony 0-1, D Ring 0-1, L Desmon 0-1.	Referee: J Dorgan (Nemo Rangers)

=== Final ===
10 October 2010 Final	Ballymartle	2-14 – 0-13	Tracton	Páirc Uí Chaoimh, Cork
	B Dwyer 0-6 (0-4 fs), D Dwyer 2-0; J Dwyer 0-4; D McCarthy 0-3 (0-1 f, 0-1 65); R Dwyer 0-1.	Report	R Walsh 0-7 (0-6 fs, 0-1 65); S O’Sullivan 0-2; K Corrigan, J Kingston, F Lynch, M O’Sullivan 0-1 each.	Referee: D Kirwan (Éire Óg)

== Championship statistics ==
=== Top scorers ===
Top scorer overall

Rank	Player	Club	Tally	Total	Matches	Average
1	Ronan Walsh	Tracton	2-57	63	7	9.00
2	Séamus Hayes	Ballyhea	6-14	32	7	4.57
3	Brendan Ring	Youghal	1-28	31	5	6.20
4	Pa Finnegan	Aghabullogue	4-18	30	4	7.50
5	Ray O'Donovan	Valley Rovers	1-22	25	4	6.25
5	Michael Spillane	Castlelyons	1-22	25	5	5.00
6	Barry Dwyer	Ballymartle	0-23	23	4	5.75
7	Neil Ronan	Ballyhea	1-19	22	3	7.33
8	Eoin Conway	Fr. O'Neill's	0-21	21	4	5.25
8	Daire Lordan	Courcey Rovers	0-21	21	7	3.00

Top scorers in a single game

Rank	Player	Club	Tally	Total	Opposition
1	Ronan Walsh	Tracton	0-13	13	Aghabullogue
2	Pa Finnegan	Aghabullogue	1-08	11	Courcey Rovers
2	Paddy O'Regan	Watergrasshill	0-11	11	Castlelyons
3	Cormac Murphy	Mallow	0-10	10	Castlelyons
4	Ronan Walsh	Tracton	1-06	9	Argideen Rangers
4	Pa Finnegan	Aghabullogue	2-03	9	Tracton
4	Barry Dwyer	Ballymartle	0-09	9	Newcestown
4	Ronan Walsh	Tracton	0-09	9	Ballymartle
5	Séamus Hayes	Courcey Rovers	2-02	8	Valley Rovers
5	Neil Ronan	Ballyhea	1-05	8	Newcestown
5	Fionn Keane	Newcestown	1-05	8	Ballyhea
5	Simon O'Brien	Carrigaline	1-05	8	Fr. O'Neill's
5	Ronan Walsh	Tracton	1-05	8	Youghal
5	Eoin Conway	Fr. O'Neill's	0-08	8	Carrigaline
5	Neil Ronan	Ballyhea	0-08	8	Valley Rovers
5	Eoin Conway	Fr. O'Neill's	0-08	8	Castlelyons
5	Michael Spillane	Castlelyons	0-08	8	Courcey Rovers

=== Miscellaneous ===
- There was confusion at the end of the semi-final between Tracton and Youghal, with the scoreboards in Páirc Uí Chaoimh reading 1-12 a-piece though many had Tracton on 1-13 at the final whistle. The uncertainty centred on a second-half Sean O’Sullivan effort for Tracton – many credited the Tracton player with a point to put his side three ahead but it is understood the ball went wide, and late in the game the scoreboard display at both ends was changed out of sequence to ‘deduct’ a point from Tracton.
