= Billy Cooper (footballer) =

English footballer

Personal information
- Full name: William George Edward Cooper
- Date of birth: 2 November 1917
- Place of birth: York, England
- Date of death: 1978 (aged 60–61)
- Place of death: Halifax, England
- Position: Centre forward

Senior career*
Years	Team	Apps	(Gls)
–1939	Chesterfield		
1939–1946	Halifax Town	2	(0)
1946–1948	Bradford City	7	(4)
1948–19??	Rochdale	0	(0)
- * Club domestic league appearances and goals

William George Edward Cooper (2 November 1917 – 1978) was an English professional footballer who played as a centre forward.

== Career ==
Born in York, Cooper played for Chesterfield, Halifax Town, Bradford City and Rochdale. For Bradford City he made 7 appearances in the Football League, scoring 4 goals.

== Sources ==
- Frost, Terry (1988). Bradford City A Complete Record 1903-1988. Breedon Books Sport. ISBN 0-907969-38-0.
