= All-Ireland Senior Hurling Championship qualifiers =

Sporting competition

The All-Ireland Senior Hurling Championship qualifiers are a single-elimination series of qualifying games held concurrently with the Leinster and Munster championships to determine the last two remaining participants of the All-Ireland Senior Hurling Championship. Eleven teams, effectively every team that does not qualify for the respective provincial deciders, participate in the qualifiers.

The qualifiers can be traced to the introduction of the "back door system" which was first introduced in 1997, though in the early years, qualification was open only to the beaten provincial finalists in Leinster and Munster. The first true series of All-Ireland qualifiers began in 2002, when the defeated provincial quarter and semi-finalists as well as the defeated Ulster finalists were given a second opportunity of competing for the All-Ireland title. A round robin system was subsequently introduced for a brief period, however, the single-elimination series returned in 2008.

While the qualifiers were introduced as a way of helping the so-called "weaker" teams, the system has occasionally come in for criticism for giving the more successful teams a greater chance of winning the All-Ireland title.

== Format ==
In 2013 a record eleven teams participated in the qualifiers.

The seven teams eliminated prior to the provincial semi-finals entered the qualifiers at the preliminary and phase one stages. Six of the seven teams played in the preliminary round while the seventh team received a bye to phase one. An open draw was made to determine the pairings. The three winners of the preliminary round joined the seventh team in phase one. Once again another draw was made to determine the pairings. The two winners of these games advanced to phase three.

Phase two saw the defeated Leinster and Munster semi-finalists face each other. The two winners advanced to phase three.

The phase one and phase two winners played against each other in phase three. The two winners advanced to the All-Ireland quarter-finals.

== History ==
=== Early years ===
Since its inception in 1887 the championship had been played on a straight knock-out basis. If any team was defeated at any stage of the provincial or All-Ireland competitions it meant automatic elimination. This system was deemed the fairest as the All-Ireland champions would usually be the only undefeated team in that years Championship. There were some problems with this system. Over the years Galway had become the only credible hurling team in Connacht, thus giving them an automatic pass into the All-Ireland semi-finals every year. Similarly in Ulster there were many problems as hurling was much weaker and confined to a small few counties in the north-east of the province.

=== Back door system ===
In 1995 the Hurling Development Committee began investigating a way of improving hurling in general and revamping the championship. Their proposals involved allowing the defeated Munster and Leinster finalists to re-enter the All-Ireland championship. While the two provincial final winners would automatically qualify for the All-Ireland semi-finals, the two defeated provincial teams would join Galway and the Ulster champions in two play-off games or “quarter-finals”. The two winners from these two games would then qualify for the semi-finals where they would be drawn against the Leinster and Munster champions. Repeat games would be avoided in the All-Ireland semi-final stage.

At the start of 1996 these proposals looked unlikely of being introduced, however, a whistle-stop tour undertaken by the committee's secretary Frank Murphy and Pat Daly, the GAA's Games Development Officer, had changed the position. In April 1996 the committee's proposals were accepted at the GAA's annual congress. Most counties supported the new proposals and motion 15 (a) was passed with more than a two-thirds majority.

Tipperary and Kilkenny were the first two teams to benefit from the back door system as defeated provincial finalists in 1997. Tipperary went all the way to the All-Ireland final to set up an all Munster decider with Clare. Tradition prevailed on that occasion as Munster champions Clare triumphed by 0-20 to 2-13.

The following year the All-Ireland final was an all Leinster affair, with Kilkenny facing Offaly in a repeat of the provincial decider. It was an historic occasion as Offaly overturned their provincial defeat to secure a 2-16 to 1-13 victory.

=== Qualifiers: 2002-2004 ===
In 2002 the back-door system was expanded to involve teams beaten in the early stages of the provincial series of games.

The newly expanded system featured two rounds of games. Round one involved Galway, who entered the championship at this stage, the Ulster runners-up and the defeated teams from the quarter-finals and semi-finals of the Leinster and Munster campaigns. An open draw was made to determine the pairings, however, repeat games were not permitted. Four teams were eliminated at this stage while the four winners advanced to round two. Here they joined the defeated Leinster and Munster finalists. An open draw was made to determine the three pairings, however, once again repeat games were not permitted. Three teams were eliminated at this stage while the three winners advanced to the All-Ireland quarter-finals.

In the first season of the new format, Clare reached the All-Ireland final having been defeated by Tipperary in the Munster quarter-final.

In 2004 two teams, neither of which were their respective provincial champions, contested the All-Ireland final. Both Cork and Kilkenny had been beaten in their provincial campaigns, however, they used the qualifiers to good effect in reaching the All-Ireland decider.

=== Round robin: 2005-2007 ===
A round robin league system was introduced to the qualifiers in 2005. The Leinster and Munster champions and runners-up advanced directly to the All-Ireland quarter-finals. The three remaining teams in Leinster and Munster joined Galway and the Ulster champions in the eight-county All-Ireland qualifier series. The eight qualifier teams were divided into two groups of four teams each. Each team played three games with the top two teams in groups A and B advancing to the All-Ireland quarter-finals.

This round robin system created a series of championship anomalies. In the first year of the system both Limerick and Waterford were beaten in the Munster series of games as well as in the qualifiers. In spite of this both teams reached the All-Ireland quarter-finals and had the chance to claim the title after being beaten twice. This anomaly continued for the remainder of this system, with Galway and Cork also facing two defeats but remaining in the championship nonetheless.

== Participants ==
=== By year ===
Season	Participants	Teams progressing
2002	10	Clare, Galway, Tipperary
2003	13	Offaly, Tipperary, Wexford
2004	10	Clare, Cork, Kilkenny
2005	8	Clare, Galway, Limerick, Waterford
2006	8	Clare, Galway, Limerick, Waterford
2007	8	Clare, Cork, Galway, Tipperary
2008	8	
2009	8	
2010	9	
2011	10	
2012	10	
2013	11	
2014	8	
2015	8	
2016	8	
2017	9	
2020	6	
2021	7	

=== By county ===
County	No.	Years
Laois	17	2003, 2004, 2005, 2006, 2007, 2008, 2009, 2010, 2011, 2012, 2013, 2014, 2015, 2016, 2017, 2020, 2021
Offaly	16	2002, 2003, 2004, 2005, 2006, 2007, 2008, 2009, 2010, 2011, 2012, 2013, 2014, 2015, 2016, 2017
Clare	16	2002, 2003, 2004, 2005, 2006, 2007, 2009, 2010, 2011, 2012, 2013, 2014, 2015, 2016, 2020, 2021
Limerick	13	2002, 2003, 2004, 2005, 2006, 2008, 2009, 2010, 2011, 2012, 2015, 2016, 2017
Dublin	13	2002, 2003, 2004, 2005, 2006, 2007, 2008, 2010, 2012, 2015, 2016, 2017, 2020
Wexford	12	2002, 2003, 2009, 2010, 2011, 2012, 2013, 2014, 2015, 2016, 2020, 2021
Galway	11	2002, 2003, 2004, 2005, 2006, 2007, 2008, 2009, 2011, 2014, 2021
Cork	11	2002, 2004, 2007, 2008, 2009, 2011, 2012, 2015, 2016, 2020, 2021
Antrim	10	2005, 2007, 2008, 2009, 2010, 2011, 2012, 2013, 2014, 2021
Tipperary	9	2002, 2003, 2004, 2007, 2010, 2013, 2014, 2017, 2020
Westmeath	8	2003, 2006, 2011, 2012, 2013, 2015, 2016, 2017
Waterford	8	2003, 2005, 2006, 2008, 2013, 2014, 2017, 2021
Carlow	6	2003, 2010, 2011, 2012, 2013, 2017
Kilkenny	3	2004, 2013, 2017
Down	2	2002, 2004
Meath	1	2002
Derry	1	2003
Kerry	1	2003
London	1	2013

== Statistics ==
=== Debut of teams ===
Year	Debutants	Total
2002	Clare, Cork, Down, Dublin, Galway, Limerick, Meath, Offaly, Tipperary, Wexford	10
2003	Carlow, Derry, Kerry, Laois, Waterford, Westmeath	6
2004	Kilkenny	1
2005	Antrim	1
2006–2012	None	0
2013	London	1
2014–present	None	0
Total		19

== See also ==
- All-Ireland Senior Hurling Championship
