= 2009 Cork Premier Intermediate Hurling Championship =

- Dates: 30 April 2009 – 11 October 2009
- Teams: 16
- Champions: Douglas (1st title); Frank Tobin (captain); Finbarr Bermingham (manager)
- Runners-up: Ballymartle; Eddie Murphy (manager)
- Relegated: St. Catherine's

Tournament statistics
- Matches played: 28
- Goals scored: 67 (2.39 per match)
- Points scored: 727 (25.96 per match)
- Top scorer(s): Daniel Twomey (3-20)

The 2009 Cork Premier Intermediate Hurling Championship was the sixth staging of the Cork Premier Intermediate Hurling Championship since its establishment by the Cork County Board in 2004. The championship began on 30 April 2009 and ended on 11 October 2009.

On 17 July 2009, St. Catherine's were relegated from the championship following a 1-10 to 0-9 defeat by Mallow.

On 11 October 2009, Douglas won the championship following a 0-20 to 0-16 defeat of Ballymartle in the final. It remains their only championship title in this grade.

Newcestown's Daniel Twomey was the championship's top scorer with 3-20.

== Teams ==
A total of 16 teams contested the Premier Intermediate Championship, including 14 teams from the 2008 premier intermediate championship, one relegated from the 2008 senior championship and one promoted from the 2008 intermediate championship.

== Team changes ==
=== To Championship ===
Promoted from the Cork Intermediate Hurling Championship

- Dripsey

Relegated from the Cork Senior Hurling Championship

- St. Catherine's

=== From Championship ===
Promoted to the Cork Senior Hurling Championship

- Blarney

Relegated to the Cork Intermediate Hurling Championship

- Aghada

== Results ==
=== Round 1 ===
30 April 2009 Round 1	St. Catherine's	1-13 - 1-16	Carrigaline	Caherlag Sportsfield, Glounthaune
	M Hegarty 1-3, S Cotter 0-6, Shane Kearney 0-2, R O'Connell 0-1, C Aherne 0-1.		S O'Brien 0-7, C Neville 1-1, J Moran 0-2, T Murphy 0-2, D Drake 0-1, W O'Brien 0-1, P Murphy 0-1, R Keohane 0-1.	Referee: K Murphy (Nemo Rangers)

1 May 2009 Round 1	Courcey Rovers	1-11 - 0-19	Tracton	Carrigaline
	N Murphy 0-8, S Hayes 1-0, V Hurley 0-2, J O'Regan 0-1.		R Walsh 0-10, J Kinsgton 0-2, K Lynch 0-2, G Kingston 0-2, S O'Sullivan 0-1, C Lordan 0-1, K Corrigan 0-1.	Referee: C Lyons (Nemo Rangers)

2 May 2009 Round 1	Argideen Rangers	2-13 - 3-08	Watergrasshill	Páirc Uí Chaoimh, Cork
	R O'Sullivan 1-3, M Walsh 1-2, JM O'Callaghan 0-5, M O'Callaghan 0-2, B Hennessy 0-1.		P O'Regan 1-6, P O'Brien 1-1, P Cahill 1-0, S O'Callaghan 0-1.	Referee: C Lane (Banteer)

3 May 2009 Round 1	Aghabullogue	1-13 - 1-14	Fr. O'Neill's	Páirc Uí Rinn, Cork
	P Finnegan 0-5, D Twomey 1-1, N Buckley 0-2, K Finnegan 0-2, M O'Connor 0-2, B Kiely 0-1.		G O'Leary 1-10, B Murphy 0-4.	Referee: M O'Mahony (Kilbrittain)

3 May 2009 Round 1	Ballyhea	2-13 - 1-18	Ballymartle	Páirc Mac Gearailt, Fermoy
	D Ronan 2-1, M O'Sullivan 0-5, N Ronan 0-4, E O'Sullivan 0-1, R Hanley 0-1, I Ronan 0-1.		R O'Dwyer 0-7, D Dwyer 1-1, B Corry 0-4, J O'Dwyer 0-3, D McCarthy 0-2, P O'Dwyer 0-1.	Referee: D O'Leary (Watergrasshill)

3 May 2009 Round 1	Youghal	1-14 - 2-10	Mallow	St. Catherine's Park, Ballynoe
	L Desmond 0-7, K Walsh 1-0, N Roche 0-3, B Ring 0-2, B Cooper 0-2.		P Dineen 1-5, B Murphy 1-1, M Maher 0-2, C O'Riordan 0-1, K Sheehan 0-1.	Referee: P Downey (Inniscarra)

6 May 2009 Round 1	Douglas	1-14 - 2-11	Newcestown	Liam MacCarthy Park, Ballygarvan
	P Barry 1-0, J Moylan 0-3, T Cullinane 0-3, S Moylan 0-2, M Collins 0-1, W Coveney 0-1, C Dineen 0-1, R Murphy 0-1, C Lucey 0-1, E Cadogan 0-1.		D Twomey 1-6, C Keane 1-1, T Twomey 0-2, G O'Driscoll 0-1, M Bradfield 0-1.	Referee: A Cummins (Ballymartle)

9 May 2009 Round 1	Ballincollig	1-12 - 3-14	Inniscarra	Cloughduv
	J O'Neill 0-5, E O'Sullivan 1-0, J Dwyer 0-3, R Ryan 0-1, R Doherty 0-1, C O'Sullivan 0-1, J O'Brien 0-1.		C Casey 1-4, J Olden 1-1, D O'Connell 1-0, S O'Mahony 0-4, A O'Mahony 0-2, F Olden 0-1, K Dineen 0-1, J O'Mahony 0-1.	Referee: C Lane (Banteer)

15 May 2009 Round 1 replay	Douglas	0-16 - 1-06	Newcestown	Cloughduv
	R Murphy 0-4, S Moylan 0-4, E Cadogan 0-3, M Collins 0-2, B Fitzgerald 0-1, C Lucey 0-1, P Barry 0-1.		D Twomey 0-4, C O'Donovan 1-0, G O'Driscoll 0-1, M Bradfield 0-1.	Referee: D Copps (Ballyhea)

=== Round 2 ===
17 May 2009 Round 2	Courcey Rovers	1-11 - 3-12	Ballyhea	Páirc Uí Chaoimh, Cork
	S Hayes 1-2, N Murphy 0-3, J Murphy 0-2, D Hayes 0-1, D Lordan 0-1, V Hurley 0-1, J Murphy 0-1.		M O'Sullivan 2-5, N Ronan 0-4, R Hanley 1-0, L O'Connor 0-1, B Coleman 0-1, E O'Sullivan 0-1.	Referee: C McAllister (Aghada)

5 June 2009 Round 2	Mallow	1-13 - 2-14	Newcestown	Coachford
	P Dineen 0-9, C O'Riordan 1-1, K Sheehan 0-1, F McCormack 0-1, M O'Brien 0-1.		D Twomey 1-1, M Branfield 0-4, P Condon 1-0, G O'Driscoll 0-3, F Keane 0-2, C Keane 0-2, C O'Donovan 0-2.	Referee: J Bermingham (Bride Rovers)

6 June 2009 Round 2	Aghabullogue	1-10 - 0-15	Watergrasshill	Páirc Uí Rinn, Cork
	P Finnegan 1-8, N Buckley 0-2.		P O'Brien 0-6, P O'Regan 0-3, P Cahill 0-2, A Cronin 0-2, E Enright 0-1, S O'Callaghan 0-1.	Referee: M O'Mahony (Kilbrittain)

27 June 2009 Round 2	Ballincollig	0-17 - 2-08	St. Catherine's	Páirc Uí Rinn, Cork
	R Doherty 0-4, D Bowen 0-3, J Dwyer 0-3, J O'Neill 0-3, E Hegarty 0-2, A O'Donovan 0-1, C O'Sullivan 0-1.		B Mulcahy 2-0, M Hegarty 0-5, C Aherne 0-1, S Kearney 0-1, M O'Keeffe 0-1.	Referee: C Lyons (Nemo Rangers)

=== Relegation play-offs ===
21 June 2009 Semi-final	Courcey Rovers	2-11 - 1-08	Mallow	Blarney
	C Lordan 1-1, S Hayes 1-0, N Murphy 0-3, V Hurley 0-3, D Lordan 0-2, D Duggan 0-1, S Holland 0-1.		P Dineen 0-6, C O'Riordan 1-0, K Sheehan 0-1, F McCormack 0-1.	Referee: P Downey (Inniscarra)

6 July 2009 Semi-final	Aghabullogue	1-11 - 0-12	St. Catherine's	Páirc Uí Rinn, Cork
	P Finnegan 0-6, P Twomey 1-0, E Kennedy 0-2, E Twomey 0-1, P O'Rourke 0-1, K Finnegan 0-1.		M Hegarty 0-3, S Cotter 0-3, S Kearney 0-2, C Aherne 0-2, B Mulcahy 0-1, P Cotter 0-1.	Referee: J Dorgan (Nemo Rangers)

17 July 2009 Final	Mallow	1-10 - 0-09	St. Catherine's	Rathcormac
	C O'Riordan 1-3, P Dineen 0-5, M Linehan 0-1, J Hayes 0-1.		M Hegarty 0-5, S Cotter 0-2, Shane Kearney 0-1, C Aherne 0-1.	Referee: P Downey (Inniscarra)

=== Round 3 ===
13 June 2009 Round 3	Watergrasshill	2-16 - 1-18	Ballyhea	Moore Park, Kilworth
	P Cahill 0-5, P O'Regan 0-5, S O'Leary 1-1, W O'Leary 1-0, P O'Brien 0-3, A Cronin 0-1, M O'Riordan 0-1.		M O'Sullivan 0-12, L O'Connor 0-4, D Ronan 1-0, I Ronan 0-1, B Coleman 0-1.	Referee: C Lane (Banteer)

19 June 2009 Round 3	Douglas	2-08 - 2-08	Youghal	Lisgoold
	P Barry 1-0, J Moylan 1-0, R Murphy 0-2, O Mulrooney 0-1, S Moylan 0-1, B Fitzgerald 0-1, M Collins 0-1, C O'Mahony 0-1, E Cadogan 0-1.		L Desmond 0-5, K Walsh 1-0, D Ring 1-0, B Cooper 0-2, B Moloney 0-1.	Referee: D O'Farrell (Mitchelstown)

20 June 2009 Round 3	Carrigaline	1-09 - 0-14	Tracton	Rivertsick
	S Corcoran 0-4, S O'Brien 1-0, D Drake 0-1, J Cowhig 0-1, P Murphy 0-1, K O'Driscoll 0-1, P Ronayne 0-1.		R Walsh 0-10, G Kingston 0-2, K Lynch 0-1, M O'Sullivan 0-1.	Referee: D Kirwan (Éire Óg)

7 July 2009 Round 3 replay	Douglas	4-12 - 1-13	Youghal	Lisgoold
	S Moylan 1-2, B Fitzgerald 0-5, E Cadogan 1-1, J Moylan 1-1, M Collins 1-0, R Murphy 0-3.		L Desmond 0-7, D Ring 1-0, B Coleman 0-2, B Cooper 0-1, B Moloney 0-1, B Ring 0-1, E Coleman 0-1.	Referee: M Harrington (Carrigaline)

14 July 2009 Round 3	Ballincollig	1-19 - 0-13	Fr. O'Neill's	Páirc Uí Rinn, Cork
	R Ryan 0-6, J Dwyer 0-5, A Donovan 0-4, D Bowen 1-0, E O'Sullivan 0-2, R Doherty 0-1, K Kelleher 0-1.		E Conway 0-5, B Murphy 0-3, G O'Leary 0-2, E Holland 0-1, N O'Driscoll 0-1, Q Higgins 0-1.	Referee: A Cummins (Ballymartle)

=== Quarter-finals ===
19 July 2009 Quarter-final	Ballincollig	0-20 - 0-17	Tracton	Páirc Uí Rinn, Cork
	J O'Dwyer 0-9, R Doherty 0-3, R Ryan 0-3, A Donovan 0-2, R O'Driscoll 0-1, C O'Sullivan 0-1, J O'Brien 0-1.		R Walsh 0-9, K Corrigan 0-3, J Kingston 0-2, G Kinsgton 0-1, M O'Sullivan 0-1, P Kingston 0-1.	Referee: C McAllister (Aghada)

26 July 2009 Quarter-final	Ballymartle	3-13 - 0-12	Inniscarra	Páirc Uí Chaoimh, Cork
	R Dwyer 1-6, J Dwyer 1-2, B Corry 0-4, D Dwyer 1-0, Darren McCarthy 0-1.		S O'Mahony 0-4, M O'Shea 0-3, C Casey 0-2, J Olden 0-2, J O'Callaghan 0-1.	Referee: D O'Leary (Watergrasshill)

26 July 2009 Quarter-final	Argideen Rangers	2-10 - 0-18	Newcestown	Charlie Hurley Park, Bandon
	M Walsh 1-2, A O'Leary 1-1, R O'Sullivan 0-2, JM O'Callaghan 0-2, S O'Mahony 0-2, M O'Callaghan 0-1.		D Twomey 0-12, D Heffernan 0-1, G O'Driscoll 0-1, C Keane 0-1, E Kelly 0-1, M Bradfield 0-1, F Keane 0-1.	Referee: J Dorgan (Nemo Rangers)

6 August 2009 Quarter-final	Douglas	2-13 - 1-13	Watergrasshill	Clonmult Memorial Park, Midleton
	R Murphy 1-3, M Harrington 1-1, E Cadogan 0-3, J Moylan 0-2, S Moylan 0-2, M Collins 0-1, O Mulrooney 0-1.		P O'Brien 0-5, P O'Regan 1-1, P Cahill 0-4, S O'Callaghan 0-1, A Cronin 0-1, W O'Leary 0-1.	Referee: A Cummins (Ballymartle)

=== Semi-finals ===
16 August 2009 Semi-final	Ballymartle	2-16 - 1-09	Newcestown	Páirc Uí Chaoimh, Cork
	D Dwyer 2-1, R Dwyer 0-4, D McCarthy 0-2, M O'Mahony 0-2, P Coughlan 0-2, B Corry 0-2, S Corry 0-1, J Dwyer 0-1, C O'Donovan 0-1.		D Twomey 0-7, E Kelly 1-0, T Twomey 0-1, N O'Sullivan 0-1.	Referee: C McAllister (Aghada)

25 August 2009 Semi-final	Ballincollig	0-12 - 3-12	Douglas	Páirc Uí Rinn, Cork
	R Ryan 0-4, J Dwyer 0-4, R Doherty 0-2, R O'Driscoll 0-1, A DOnovan 0-1.		M Harrington 2-1, R Murphy 0-4, B Fitzgerald 1-0, J Moylan 0-2, M Collins 0-2, P Barry 0-1, C O'Mahony 0-1.	Referee: D Copps (Ballyhea)

=== Final ===
11 October 2009 Final	Douglas	0-20 – 0-16	Ballymartle	Páirc Uí Chaoimh, Cork
	R Murphy 0-7, O Mulrooney 0-4, J Moylan 0-3, M Harrington 0-3, E Cadogan 0-2, A Barry 0-1.		R Dwyer 0-10, P Coughlan 0-3, D McCarthy 0-1, J Dwyer 0-1, B Corry 0-1.	Referee: J O'Connell (Lisgoold)

== Championship statistics ==
=== Top scorers ===
Top scorer overall

Rank	Player	Club	Tally	Total	Matches	Average
1	Daniel Twomey	Newcestown	2-30	36	5	7.20
2	Rory O'Dwyer	Ballymartle	1-27	30	4	7.50
3	Ronan Walsh	Tracton	0-29	29	3	9.66
4	Maurice O'Sullivan	Ballyhea	2-22	28	4	7.00
4	Pa Dineen	Mallow	1-25	28	4	7.00
5	Richard Murphy	Douglas	1-24	27	7	3.85
6	John O'Dwyer	Ballincollig	0-24	24	5	4.80
7	Pa Finnegan	Aghabullogue	1-19	22	3	7.33
8	Paddy O'Regan	Watergrasshill	2-15	21	4	5.25
9	Michael Hegarty	St. Catherine's	1-16	19	4	4.75
9	Leigh Desmond	Youghal	0-19	19	3	6.33

Top scorers in a single game

Rank	Player	Club	Tally	Total	Opposition
1	Maurice O'Sullivan	Ballyhea	0-12	12	Watergrasshill
1	Daniel Twomey	Newcestown	0-12	12	Argideen Rangers
2	Maurice O'Sullivan	Ballyhea	2-05	11	Courcey Rovers
2	Pa Finnegan	Aghabullogue	1-08	11	Watergrasshill
3	Ronan Walsh	Tracton	0-10	10	Courcey Rovers
3	Rory O'Dwyer	Ballymartle	0-10	10	Douglas
3	Ronan Walsh	Tracton	0-10	10	Carrigaline
4	Paddy O'Regan	Watergrasshill	1-06	9	Argideen Rangers
4	Daniel Twomey	Newcestown	1-06	9	Douglas
4	Rory O'Dwyer	Ballymartle	1-06	9	Inniscarra
4	Pa Dineen	Mallow	0-09	9	Newcestown
4	Ronan Walsh	Tracton	0-09	9	Ballincollig
4	John O'Dwyer	Ballincollig	0-09	9	Tracton

=== Miscellaneous ===
- Douglas their first Premier Intermediate title.
