= Youghal GAA =

Gaelic games club in County Cork, Ireland

- Eochaill
- Founded: 1891
- County: Cork
- Nickname: The Seasiders
- Colours
- Grounds: Copperally & Magners Hill
- Coordinates: 51°57′08″N 7°51′34″W

Playing kits
Standard colours

Youghal GAA is a Gaelic Athletic Association club based in the town of Youghal, in County Cork, Ireland. The club fields both Hurling and Gaelic football teams and also has junior camogie and ladies football teams. The club is a member of Cork GAA and Imokilly divisional board.

== History ==
In 1891, the men of Youghal formed the Youghal GAA Football club (Cumann Luthcleas Gael Eochaill). Organised Gaelic football was played in Bill Farrell's field at Frogmore. The club then transferred to another field up towards the Asylum Cross in 1894, and to Copperalley in 1899. Gaelic handball was also played, but declined in the early 1900s, and was revived in the early 1920s, for a long period of time, when the Garda Barracks, at Catherine Street, had a ball alley.

Hurling began its growth in Youghal in the 1940s. The grounds at Copperalley were not owned by the club. Negotiations began in 1966 for the outright purchase of the grounds and negotiations were completed in the early 1970s. The club carried out substantial work and officially re-opened the field on 16 June 1974. The opening ceremony was performed by the then President of Ireland, Erskine Childers. On 11 December 1985, a contract was signed for the purchase of ground, from the Southern Health Board, at Magniers Hill, adjacent to St. Raphaels Hospital. This ground is used by the club's schools and under-age players. A further phase of development saw an investment of almost 1 million pounds in developing a third playing field, the fencing in of the property and the building of a community hall.

== Club colours ==
The original club jerseys were a maroon jumper, knitted, with a yellow stripe. The club could not initially afford to purchase jerseys, and so a fundraising "terrier coursing" event was held in Copperalley in 1924. The money raised enabled the club to purchase the first set of jerseys, which were green and gold. They remained the club colours until the 1960s, when the club reverted to the maroon and gold.

== Honours ==
- Cork Senior Hurling Championship (0): (Runners-Up 1972)
- Cork Senior Football Championship (0): (Runners-Up 1914, 1919, 1923)
- Munster Intermediate Club Hurling Championship (1): 2013
- Cork Intermediate Hurling Championship (4): 1955, 1969, 1988, 1993 (Runners-Up 1964, 1968, 1992)
- Cork Intermediate Football Championship (1): 2000 (Runners-Up 1970)
- Cork Premier Intermediate Hurling Championship (1): 2013 (Runners-Up 2011)
- Cork Junior Football Championship (3): 1905, 1906, 1999
- Cork Senior Hurling League (1): 1980
- Cork Minor Hurling Championship (1): 1944
- Cork Minor A Hurling Championship (1): 2022
- Cork Minor A Football Championship (1): 2000
- Cork Minor B Hurling Championship (1): 1991
- East Cork Junior A Hurling Championship (1): 1952
- East Cork Junior A Football Championship (7): 1940, 1941, 1945, 1952, 1959, 1984, 1999

== Notable club members ==
- Christy Cooney - Former president of the GAA
- Seánie O'Leary Four time All-Ireland Senior Hurling Championship winner. Three time All-Star winner.
- Daithí Cooney
- Bill Cooper
- Tony Coyne
- Brendan Coleman
- Leigh Desmond
- Noel Gallagher
- Pat Hegarty
- Willie Walsh
