= 2008 Cork Premier Intermediate Hurling Championship =

- Dates: 3 May 2008 – 19 October 2008
- Teams: 16
- Champions: Blarney (1st title); Danny Cronin (captain); Tadhg Hurley (manager)
- Runners-up: Courcey Rovers; K Moloney (captain); Seán O'Farrell (manager)
- Relegated: Aghada

Tournament statistics
- Matches played: 30
- Goals scored: 64 (2.13 per match)
- Points scored: 799 (26.63 per match)
- Top scorer(s): Ger O'Leary (2-38)

The 2008 Cork Premier Intermediate Hurling Championship was the fifth staging of the Cork Premier Intermediate Hurling Championship since its establishment by the Cork County Board in 2004. The championship began on 3 May 2008 and ended on 19 October 2008.

On 20 July 2008, Aghada were relegated from the championship following a 1-17 to 2-7 defeat by Argideen Rangers.

On 19 October 2008, Blarney won the championship following a 0-13 to 1-9 defeat of Courcey Rovers in the final. This was their first championship title in the grade.

Ger O'Leary from the Fr. O'Neill's club was the championship's top scorer with 2-38.

== Teams ==
A total of 16 teams contested the Premier Intermediate Championship, including 14 teams from the 2007 premier intermediate championship, one relegated from the 2007 senior championship and one promoted from the 2007 intermediate championship.

== Results ==
=== Round 1 ===
3 May 2008 Round 1	Douglas	0-18 - 1-10	Tracton	Páirc Uí Chaoimh, Cork
	M O'Callaghan 0-3, S Moylan 0-3, G Wade 0-3, E Cadogan 0-3, R Murphy 0-2, C Dineen 0-1, J Moylan 0-1, G McLoughlin 0-1, C O'Mahony 0-1.		K Corrigan 1-2, R Walsh 0-3, M O'Sullivan 0-2, K Lynch 0-1, F Walsh 0-1, F Lynch 0-1.	Referee: J Dorgan (Nemo Rangers)

4 May 2008 Round 1	Ballymartle	2-17 - 1-10	Ballyhea	Mallow GAA Complex, Mallow
	R Dwyer 0-10, B Coleman 1-1, G Cummins 1-0, J Dwyer 0-3, M O'Mahony 0-2, D McCarthy 0-1.		M O'Sullivan 1-1, J O'Sullivan 0-4, I Ronan 0-3, B Coleman 0-1, H O'Leary 0-1.	Referee: K Murphy (Nemo Rangers)

4 May 2008 Round 1	Courcey Rovers	3-12 - 1-10	Blarney	Cloughduv
	C Lordan 2-0, S Hayes 1-1, N Murphy 0-4, V Hurley 0-3, T Collins 0-2, D Murphy 0-1, J Murphy 0-1.		M Cremin 0-5, R McNamara 1-1, B Hurley 0-2, D McCarthy 0-1, S O'Donoghue 0-1.	Referee: C McAllister (Aghada)

4 May 2008 Round 1	Fr. O'Neill's	0-13 - 1-10	Newcestown	Páirc Uí Rinn, Cork
	J O'Leary 0-4, G Holland 0-2, J Flavin 0-2, P Butler 0-2, N Griffin 0-1, E McCarthy 0-1, A Brett 0-1.		E Kelly 0-6, P Condon 1-0, C Keane 0-2, T Twomey 0-1, D Twomey 0-1.	Referee: G Harrington (Carrigaline)

4 May 2008 Round 1	Inniscarra	2-06 - 1-09	Ballincollig
	C Casey 1-1, M Coleman 1-0, A O'Mahony 0-2, J Olden 0-1, D O'Connell 0-1, N O'Regan 0-1.		J Dwyer 0-6, E Hegarty 1-0, A Donovan 0-2, J Miskella 0-1.	Referee: C Lane (Banteer)

4 May 2008 Round 1	Youghal	2-15 - 0-12	Argideen Rangers	Páirc Uí Rinn, Cork
	L Desmond 1-9, R Cunningham 1-1, B Cooper 0-3, C Coleman 0-1, B Ring 0-1.		S O'Mahony 0-4, M O'Callaghan 0-3, M Walsh 0-2, D Crowley 0-1, J Sheehan 0-1, R O'Sullivan 0-1.	Referee: M Moynihan (Grenagh)

5 May 2008 Round 1	Watergrasshill	2-09 - 1-11	Aghada	Páirc Séamus de Barra, Carrigtwohill
	J Halbert 2-1, P O'Regan 0-3, S O'Leary 0-2, P O'Brien 0-2, P Cahill 0-1.		V Morrissey 1-2, T O'Keeffe 0-5, M Galvin 0-1, G Melvin 0-1, R Dwane 0-1, E Healy 0-1.	Referee: C Lyons (Nemo Rangers)

7 May 2008 Round 1	Aghabullogue	2-12 - 0-10	Mallow	Páirc Eoin Mhic Charthaigh, Donoughmore
	P Finnegan 0-10, D Twomey 1-1, O Healy 1-0, P Kelleher 0-1.		P Dineen 0-7, C O'Riordan 0-2, F McCormack 0-1.	Referee: D O'Flynn (Fr. O'Neill's)

9 May 2008 Round 1 replay	Newcestown	2-19 - 1-16 (aet)	Fr. O'Neill's	Páirc Uí Rinn, Cork
	E Kelly 1-6, C Keane 0-4, P Condon 1-0, A O'Sullivan 0-3, M Bradfield 0-3, D Twomey 0-3.		G O'Leary 0-9, MP Bailey 1-0, A Brett 0-2, E McCarthy 0-1, N Griffin 0-1, P Butler 0-1, J Flavin 0-1, M lawton 0-1.	Referee: P Downey (Inniscarra)

10 May 2008 Round 1 replay	Inniscarra	0-16 - 0-13	Aghabullogue	Cloughduv
	M Coleman 0-5, A O'Mahony 0-5, C Casey 0-3, D O'Connell 0-2, J Olden 0-1.		R Ryan 0-3, J Dwyer 0-3, J Miskella 0-2, E Hegarty 0-2, D Beale 0-2, R O'Driscoll 0-1.	Referee: J Bermingham (Bride Rovers)

=== Round 2 ===
18 May 2008 Round 2	Ballincollig	0-21 - 0-09	Tracton	Brinny
	R O'Doherty 0-5, D Beale 0-5, E Hegarty 0-4, J Miskella 0-3, R Ryan 0-2, R O'Driscoll 0-1, C O'Sullivan 0-1.		R Walsh 0-4, S O'Sullivan 0-2, F Walsh 0-1, K Corrigan 0-1, M O'Sullivan 0-1.	Referee: E Sheehy (Newcestown)

18 May 2008 Round 2	Ballyhea	0-15 - 1-12	Fr. O'Neill's	Páirc Uí Chaoimh, Cork
	N Ronan 0-5, M O'Sullivan 0-4, T Shanahan 0-2, I Ronan 0-1, D Ronan 0-1, A Crowley 0-1, C Hanley 0-1.		J O'Leary 0-7, J Flavin 1-0, J Holland 0-2, E McCarthy 0-1, A Brett 0-1, E Holland 0-1.	Referee: J Kearney (Na Piarsaigh)

18 May 2008 Round 2	Mallow	2-15 - 0-18	Argideen Rangers	Cloughduv
	P Dineen 1-6, B Murphy 1-1, M Maher 0-3, C O'Riordan 0-3, F McCormack 0-1, M Buckley 0-1.		S O'Mahony 0-13, R O'Sullivan 0-2, M O'Callaghan 0-1, M Walsh 0-1, J Sheehan 0-1.	Referee: D O'Leary (Watergrasshill)

23 May 2008 Round 2 replay	Fr. O'Neill's	5-16 - 4-18 (aet)	Ballyhea	Ballyhooly
	G O'Leary 2-9, B Murphy 1-1, E Holland 1-1, E McCarthy 1-0, J Flavin 0-3, P Butler 0-1, G Holland 0-1.		N Ronan 1-9, M O'Sullivan 2-2, D Ronan 1-0, G Morrissey 0-2, I Curtin 0-2, B Coleman 0-1, I Ronan 0-1, C Hanley 0-1.	Referee: C Lyons (Nemo Rangers)

31 May 2008 Round 2	Blarney	0-10 - 0-07	Aghada	Páirc Uí Rinn, Cork
	M Cremin 0-4, S O'Donoghue 0-3, J Hurley 0-1, C Murphy 0-1, M McCarthy 0-1.		T O'Keeffe 0-4, G Melvin 0-2, J Connolly 0-1.

=== Relegation play-offs ===
14 June 2008 Semi-final	Ballyhea	1-20 - 1-11	Argideen Rangers	Coachford
	N Ronan 0-8, M O'Sullivan 0-5, A Crowley 1-1, T Shanahan 0-3, E Rea 0-1, D Ronan 0-1, I Curtin 0-1.		S O'Mahony 0-5, B Hennessy 1-1, J Sheehan 0-3, M O'Callaghan 0-2.	Referee: J Bermingham (Bride Rovers)

12 July 2008 Semi-final	Tracton	1-15 - 0-15	Aghada	Riverstown
	R Walsh 0-8, F Lynch 0-4, F Walsh 1-0, J Kingston 0-2, S O'Sullivan 0-1.		T O'Keeffe 0-8, G Melvin 0-4, P Wall 0-2, P O'Neill 0-1.	Referee: P Downey (Inniscarra)

20 July 2008 Final	Argideen Rangers	1-17 - 2-07	Aghada	Minane Bridge
	N Harte 1-1, S O'Mahony 0-4, J Sheehan 0-4, M O'Callaghan 0-3, B Hennessy 0-2, M Walsh 0-1, R O'Sullivan 0-1, N Coomey 0-1.		P O'Neill 1-3, E Healy 1-0, G Melvin 0-2, T O'Keeffe 0-1, V Morrissey 0-1.	Referee: K Healy (Ballymartle)

=== Round 3 ===
13 June 2008 Round 3	Ballymartle	1-23 - 0-17	Newcestown	Páirc Uí Ríogáin, Ballinspittle
	B Dwyer 0-10, B Coleman 1-5, J Dwyer 0-4, D McCarthy 0-2, B Corry 0-1, M O'Mahony 0-1.		E Kelly 0-5, M Bradfield 0-3, C Keane 0-3, D Twomey 0-2, A O'Sullivan 0-2, H Curran 0-1, P Conlon 0-1.	Referee: G O'Connell (Lisgoold)

22 June 2008 Round 3	Blarney	1-14 - 0-09	Watergrasshill	Páirc Uí Chaoimh, Cork
	M Cremin 0-5, B Deasy 1-0, E Hallahan 0-2, J Hurley 0-2, R McNamara 0-1, S O'Donoghue 0-1, R Byrne 0-1, C Murphy 0-1, J Jordan 0-1.		J Halbert 0-3, S O'Leary 0-2, P Cahill 0-2, P O'Regan 0-1, K Coakley 0-1.

28 June 2008 Round 3	Youghal	2-16 - 3-13	Douglas	Páirc Séamus de Barra, Carrigtwohill
	L Desmond 0-9, Brendan Ring 1-2, N Roche 1-1, Damien Ring 0-2, C Coleman 0-1, R Cunningham 0-1.		M Harrington 2-5, M O'Callaghan 1-0, S Moylan 0-3, J Moylan 0-2, C Dineen 0-1, E Cadogan 0-1, W Coveney 0-1.	Referee: D Kirwan (Éire Óg)

8 July 2008 Round 3	Ballincollig	3-18 - 1-08	Aghabullogue	Cloughduv
	A Donovan 2-3, N Allen 1-1, E Hegarty 0-4, J Dwyer 0-4, R Ryan 0-3, R Doherty 0-2, K Kelleher 0-1.		B Kiely 1-1, P Finnegan 0-4, K Finnegan 0-2, T O'Leary 0-1.	Referee: G O'Connell (Lisgoold)

18 August 2008 Round 3 replay	Douglas	1-17 - 0-17	Youghal	Páirc Séamus de Barra, Carrigtwohill
	S Moylan 0-5, E Cadogan 0-4, C Dineen 1-1, W Coveney 0-3, J Moylan 0-2, R Harris 0-1, M Collins 0-1.		L Desmond 0-12, C O'Mahony 0-2, B Cooper 0-1, C Coleman 0-1, B Coleman 0-1.	Referee: P Downey (Inniscarra)

=== Quarter-finals ===
29 June 2008 Quarter-final	Mallow	1-15 – 1-11	Inniscarra	Páirc Uí Rinn, Cork
	P Dineen 0-8, C O'Riordan 1-2, J Hayes 0-3, M Maher 0-1, C Kerrisk 0-1.		A O'Mahony 0-4, W O'Donnell 1-0 (og), N O'Regan 0-3, D Lynch 0-1, S Olden 0-1, J Olden 0-1, C Casey 0-1.	Referee: G O'Connell (Lisgoold)

11 July 2008 Quarter-final	Courcey Rovers	1-18 – 1-11	Fr. O’Neill’s	Páirc Uí Rinn, Cork
	C Lordan 0-6, N Murphy 0-5, S Hayes 1-1, V Hurley 0-3, K Moloney 0-1, T Collins 0-1, J O'Regan 0-1.		G O'Leary 0-9, K Wall 1-0, A Brett 0-1, P Butler 0-1.	Referee: C Lyons (Nemo Rangers)

18 July 2008 Quarter-final	Blarney	1-11 – 0-13	Ballincollig	Páirc Uí Rinn, Cork
	J O'Sullivan 1-0, C Murphy 0-3, M Cremin 0-3, B Deasy 0-2, M McCarthy 0-1, E Hallahan 0-1, J Hurley 0-1.		R Ryan 0-4, J Dwyer 0-3, C O'Sullivan 0-1, C Kelleher 0-1, E O'Sullivan 0-1, E Hegarty 0-1, R Doherty 0-1, J O'Brien 0-1.	Referee: C McAllister (Aghada)

20 September 2008 Quarter-final	Douglas	2-20 – 1-13	Ballymartle	Páirc Uí Rinn, Cork
	M Harrington 1-5, S Moylan 0-6, C Dineen 1-0, S Cadogan 0-2, B Fitzgerald 0-2, J Moylan 0-2, C O'Mahony 0-1, M Collins 0-1, W Coveney 0-1.		B Dwyer 0-6, J Dwyer 1-0, B Corry 0-2, R Dwyer 0-2, B Coleman 0-1, M O'Mahony 0-1, P Dwyer 0-1.	Referee: D Copps (Ballyhea)

=== Semi-finals ===
17 August 2008 Semi-final	Courcey Rovers	2-15 – 0-10	Mallow	Páirc Uí Chaoimh, Cork
	S Hayes 1-5; C Lordan 1-1; V Hurley (0-1 free), J Murphy 0-3 each; N Murphy 0-2 (frees); T Collins 0-1.	Report	P Dineen 0-6 (0-4 frees); F McCormack 1-1; B Murphy, BJ Ryan, D McInerney 0-1 each.	Referee: C Lyons (Nemo Rangers)

12 October 2008 Semi-final	Blarney	1-09 – 0-05	Douglas	Páirc Uí Chaoimh, Cork
	M Crmein 0-5, J Hurley 1-1, E Hallahan 0-1, C Murphy 0-1, D McCarthy 0-1.		W Coveney 0-1, S Moylan 0-1, M Harrington 0-1, B Fitzgerald 0-1, M Collins 0-1.	Referee: G O'Connell (Lisgoold)

=== Final ===
19 October 2008 Final	Blarney	0-13 - 1-09	Courcey Rovers	Páirc Uí Chaoimh, Cork
	M Cremin 0-5, R McNamara 0-3, C Murphy 0-3, E Hallahan 0-2.		C Lordan 1-3, N Murphy 0-4, V Hurley 0-1, T Collins 0-1.	Referee: C McAllister (Aghada)

== Championship statistics ==
=== Top scorers ===
Top scorer overall

Rank	Player	Club	Tally	Total	Matches	Average
1	Ger O'Leary	Fr. O'Neill's	2-38	44	5	8.80
2	Leigh Desmond	Youghal	1-30	33	3	11.00
3	Pa Dineen	Mallow	1-27	30	4	7.50
4	Mark Cremin	Blarney	0-27	27	6	4.50
5	Shane O'Mahony	Argideen Rangers	0-26	26	4	6.50
6	Neil Ronan	Ballyhea	1-22	25	3	8.33
7	Cian Lordan	Courcey Rovers	4-10	22	4	5.50
8	Maurice O'Sullivan	Ballyhea	3-12	21	4	5.25
9	Mark Harrington	Douglas	3-11	20	4	5.00
9	Eoin Kelly	Newcestown	1-17	20	3	6.66

Top scorers in a single game

Rank	Player	Club	Tally	Total	Opposition
1	Ger O'Leary	Fr. O'Neill's	2-09	15	Ballyhea
2	Shane O'Mahony	Argideen Rangers	0-13	13	Mallow
3	Leigh Desmond	Youghal	1-09	12	Argideen Rangers
3	Neil Ronan	Ballyhea	1-09	12	Fr. O'Neill's
3	Leigh Desmond	Youghal	0-12	12	Douglas
4	Mark Harrington	Douglas	2-05	11	Youghal
5	Rory Dwyer	Ballymartle	0-10	10	Ballyhea
5	Pa Finnegan	Aghabullogue	0-10	10	Mallow
5	Barry Dwyer	Ballymartle	0-10	10	Newcestown
5	Alan Donovan	Ballincollig	2-03	9	Aghabullogue
5	Eoin Kelly	Newcestown	1-06	9	Fr. O'Neill's
5	Pa Dineen	Mallow	1-06	9	Argideen Rangers
5	Ger O'Leary	Fr. O'Neill's	1-06	9	Newcestown
5	Leigh Desmond	Youghal	0-09	9	Douglas
5	Ger O'Leary	Fr. O'Neill's	0-09	9	Courcey Rovers

=== Miscellaneous ===
- By gaining promotion, Blarney return to the Cork Senior Hurling Championship after a hiatus of nearly 70 years.
- Blarney their first Premier Intermediate title.
