= 2023 Cork Premier Intermediate Hurling Championship =

- Dates: 5 August - 15 October 2023
- Teams: 12
- Sponsor: Co-Op Superstores
- Champions: Castlelyons (1st title); Colm Spillane (captain); Noel Furlong (manager)
- Runners-up: Kilworth; Brian Sheehan (captain); Austin O'Hara (captain); Pat O'Brien (manager)
- Relegated: Bandon

Tournament statistics
- Matches played: 24
- Goals scored: 58 (2.42 per match)
- Points scored: 768 (32 per match)
- Top scorer(s): Alan Fenton (0-49)

The 2023 Cork Premier Intermediate Hurling Championship was the 20th staging of the Cork Premier Intermediate Hurling Championship since its establishment by the Cork County Board in 2004. The draw for the group stage placings took place on 11 December 2022. The championship ran from 5 August to 15 October 2023.

The final was played on 15 October 2023 at Páirc Uí Chaoimh in Cork, between Castlelyons and Kilworth, in what was their first ever meeting in the final. Castlelyons won the match by 0-19 to 0-17 to claim their first ever championship title.

Alan Fenton was the championship's top scorer with 0-49.

== Team changes ==
=== To Championship ===
Relegated from the Cork Senior A Hurling Championship

- Ballymartle

Promoted from the Cork Intermediate A Hurling Championship

- Dungourney

=== From Championship ===
Promoted to the Cork Senior A Hurling Championship

- Inniscarra

Relegated to the Cork Intermediate A Hurling Championship

- Youghal

== Group A ==
=== Group A table ===
Knockout stage Relegation playoff

Team	Matches				Score			Pts
Team	Pld	W	D	L	For	Against	Diff	Pts
Ballincollig	3	2	0	1	71	48	23	4
Castlelyons	3	2	0	1	70	48	22	4
Dungourney	3	2	0	1	46	55	-9	4
Bandon	3	0	0	3	42	78	-36	0

=== Group A results ===
5 August 2023 Round 1	Ballincollig	2-10 - 1-14	Dungourney	Páirc Uí Chonaill
	J Dywer 1-2, C O’Driscoll 1-0, B Keating, D O’Sullivan 0-2 (0-1 f) each, S O'Neill 0-2, C Dorgan (f), S Wills 0-1 each.	Report	J Leahy 0-11 f, John Ahern 1-0, C Griffin 0-2, R Denny 0-1.	Referee: A Hyland (Kilworth)

6 August 2023 Round 1	Castlelyons	4-15 - 1-12	Bandon	Ballyanley Grounds
	A Fenton 0-8 (0-6 f), D Morrison 2-0, A Spillane, C McCarthy 1-1 each, L Doocey 0-2, O Hallihan, B Murphy, J Barry 0-1 each.	Report	C Long 0-8 (0-7 f), E McSweeney 1-0, D Crowley 0-2, C Lynch, M Sugrue 0-1 each.	Referee: K O'Sullivan (Valley Rovers)

12 August 2023 Round 2	Bandon	0-08 - 3-20	Ballincollig	Cloughduv Grounds
	C Long 0-2, M Sugrue (f), D Crowley, C Lynch, A O’Mahony, E McSweeney, S Ahern 0-1 each.	Report	C Dorgan 0-7 (0-5 f), S Wills 0-5, B Keating, C O’Driscoll 1-2 each, J Dwyer 1-0, D O’Sullivan 0-2 (0-1 65, 0-1 f), C O'Leary, P Kelly 0-1 each.	Referee: E Coleman (Youghal)

13 August 2023 Round 2	Dungourney	0-07 - 1-17	Castlelyons	Bride Rovers Park
	J Leahy 0-4 f, B Forbes, R Denny (f), S Hegarty 0-1 each.	Report	A Fenton 0-10 (0-6 f, 0-1 65), A Spillane 1-2, C McCarthy 0-2, J Kearney, L Doocey, D Morrison 0-1 each.	Referee: P O'Driscoll (Bride Rovers)

3 September 2023 Round 3	Castlelyons	3-14 - 1-23	Ballincollig	Mallow GAA Complex
	A Spillane (1-5); D Morrison (2-0); A Fenton (0-5, 5f); C McCarthy (0-2); O Hallihan, B Murphy (0-1 each).	Report	C Dorgan (0-9, 7f); S Willis, B Keating, T O’Connell (0-3 each); C O’Driscoll (1-0); D O’Sullivan (0-2); C Sexton, J Dwyer, S O’Neill (0-1 each).	Referee: S Scanlon (Newcestown)

3 September 2023 Round 3	Bandon	1-16 - 0-22	Dungourney	Cloughduv Grounds
	C Long 0-8 f, C Lynch 1-1, D Crowley 0-3, D Collins 0-2, M Cahalane, E McSweeney 0-1 each.	Report	J Leahy (0-5 f) 0-10, S Hegarty, C Griffin 0-3 each, J Ahern, M Leahy 0-2 each, D Healy, B Forbes 0-1 each.	Referee: C Dineen (Douglas)

== Group B ==
=== Group B table ===
Knockout stage Relegation playoff

Team	Matches				Score			Pts
Team	Pld	W	D	L	For	Against	Diff	Pts
Valley Rovers	3	2	0	1	77	70	7	4
Ballymartle	3	2	0	1	58	52	6	4
Éire Óg	3	2	0	1	71	69	2	4
Carrigaline	3	0	0	3	58	73	-15	0

=== Group B results ===
5 August 2023 Round 1	Ballymartle	0-19 - 0-13	Carrigaline	Ted Hanley Memorial Park
	D McCarthy 0-10 f, B Corry, L O’Callaghan 0-3 each, S Cummins 0-2, D Desmond 0-1.	Report	B Kelleher 0-8 f, D Drake 0-2, E Desmond, D Greene, K O’Reilly 0-1 each.	Referee: B Barry-Murphy (Aghabullogue)

5 August 2023 Round 1	Éire Óg	3-20 - 1-23	Valley Rovers	Ballymaw Grounds
	E O’Shea 0-12 (0-10 f), J Sheehan 1-2, D Kirwan 1-2, K Hallissey 1-0, J Cooper 0-2, D Desmond, O O’Shea 0-1 each.	Report	C Butler 0-12 (0-4 f), C Lyons 1-1, K Canty 0-3, J Walsh 0-2, C Kilduff 0-2, W Hurley, E Guinane, D Murphy 0-1 each.	Referee: W Wallis (Midleton)

12 August 2023 Round 2	Valley Rovers	0-22 - 0-19	Ballymartle	Carrigaline Grounds
	C Butler 0-10 (0-7 f, 0-3 65), C Lyons 0-6, A Kenneally, J Walsh 0-2 each, K Canty C Kilduff 0-1 each.	Report	D McCarthy 0-12 (0-11 f), L O’Callaghan 0-3, C Cummins, D Desmond, R Deasy, S O’Mahony (f) 0-1 each.	Referee: B Coniry (Crosshaven)

13 August 2023 Round 2	Carrigaline	3-14 - 2-19	Éire Óg	Brinny Sportsfield
	B Kelleher (3-8, 0-5 frees), E Desmond and D Greene (0-2 each), D Drake and F O’Connell (0-1 each).	Report	E O’Shea (0-9, 0-8 frees), J Cooper (1-4), C O’Callaghan (1-2), K Hallissey (0-2), D Kirwan and J Sheehan (0-1 each).	Referee: P O'Mahony (Kilbrittain)

3 September 2023 Round 3	Carrigaline	0-22 - 2-23	Valley Rovers	Páirc Liam Mhic Cárthaigh
	B Kelleher 0-8 (0-7 frees), D Drake (0-6), R O’Shea (0-5), D Griffin (0-2), K O’Reilly (0-1).	Report	C Butler 0-11 (0-9 frees), K Canty 1-3, C Lyons 1-2, D Murphy, A Kenneally, W Hurley 0-2 each, E Guinane 0-1.	Referee: B Sweeney (Erin's Own)

3 September 2023 Round 3	Ballymartle	2-14 - 0-17	Éire Óg	Ballyanley Grounds
	D McCarthy 1-7 (1-0 pen, 0-5 f), S Cummins 1-1, R Deasy 0-3, R Cahalane 0-2, B Corry 0-1.	Report	E O'Shea 0-7 (0-5 f), J Sheehan 0-4, D Kirwan 0-3, J Cooper 0-2, K Hallissey 0-1.	Referee: P Lyons (Bishopstown)

== Group C ==
=== Group C table ===
Knockout stage

Team	Matches				Score			Pts
Team	Pld	W	D	L	For	Against	Diff	Pts
Castlemartyr	3	2	0	1	68	5741	11	4
Kilworth	3	1	1	1	61	65	-4	3
Ballinhassig	3	1	1	1	62	62	0	3
Watergrasshill	3	0	2	1	53	60	-7	2

=== Group C results ===
6 August 2023 Round 1	Watergrasshill	1-16 - 2-13	Kilworth	Bride Rovers Park
	S O’Regan 0-7 (0-6 f), A Foley 1-2 (1-0 pen, 0-2 f), S Desmond 0-3, B Lehane 0-2, J Gowen, L Foley 0-1 each.	Report	L Coffey 1-2, N McNamara 0-4 f, W Condon 1-0, L Whelan 0-3, E Carey, J Sheehan 0-2 each.	Referee: C Dineen (Douglas)

6 August 2023 Round 1	Castlemartyr	1-17 - 1-20	Ballinhassig	Páirc Liam Mhic Cárthaigh
	M Kelly (0-9, 0-8 frees), Joe Stack (1-2), Barry Lawton (0-3), J McGann, E Martin and C Whyte (0-1 each).	Report	F O’Leary (1-3), B Lynch (0-6, 0-4 frees), D O’Donovan (0-3, all frees), C Desmond, G Collins, and A O’Sullivan (0-2 each), M Collins and C Tyers (0-1 each).	Referee: B Coniry (Crosshaven)

12 August 2023 Round 2	Ballinhassig	0-18 - 0-18	Watergrasshill	Riverstown Sportsfield
	B Lynch (0-8, 0-6 frees), D O’Donovan (0-3, frees), F O’Leary (0-2), D O’Sullivan, C Grainger, G Collins, C Desmond and R Lombard (0-1 each).	Report	S O’Regan (0-7, frees), D O’Leary, B Lehane and C Cronin (0-2 each), A Foley (free), M O’Driscoll, M Foley, J Gowen and S Desmond (0-1 each).	Referee: P Lyons (Bishopstown)

13 August 2023 Round 2	Kilworth	1-15 - 3-16	Castlemartyr	Páirc Lios gCúl
	M Sheehan 0-7 (0-6 f), E Carey 0-4, W Condon 1-1, N McNamara 0-2 (0-1 f), J Sheehan 0-1.	Report	J Stack 1-4, M Kelly 0-6 (0-1 f), J McGann, C Whyte 1-1 each, C Slice 0-2, Barry Lawton, A Kelly 0-1 each.	Referee: C Walsh (Nemo Rangers)

3 September 2023 Round 3	Ballinhassig	2-15 - 3-15	Kilworth	Bride Rovers Park
	A O’Sullivan (1-3); G Collins (1-2, 1-1 frees); C Grainger, B Lynch (2 frees), Diarmuid O’Sullivan (0-2 each); M Collins, Darragh O’Sullivan, R Lombard, C Desmond (0-1 each).	Report	M Sheehan (1-8, 0-5 frees, 0-1 65); J Saich, B Sheehan (1-0 each); L Whelan, J Sheehan, N McNamara (0-2 each); W Condon (0-1).	Referee: P O'Mahony (Kilbrittain)

3 September 2023 Round 3	Castlemartyr	2-17 - 0-16	Watergrasshill	Páirc Lios gCúl
	M Kelly 0-9 (0-6 f); Barry Lawton 0-5, A Kelly 1-1, J Stack 1-0, D Joyce, C Sice 0-1 each.	Report	S O’Regan 0-9 (0-7 f); S Desmond 0-4, L Foley 0-2, M O’Driscoll, D Farrell 0-1 each.	Referee: B Murphy (Carrigtwohill)

== Knockout stage ==
=== Bracket ===
Quarter-Finals
Castlelyons	0-16
Ballymartle	0-07
Kilworth	1-22
Valley Rovers	3-12

Semi-Finals
Castlemartyr	0-10
Castlelyons	2-10
Ballincollig	2-16
Kilworth	1-20

Final
Castlelyons	0-19
Kilworth	0-17

=== Relegation playoff ===
17 September 2023 Playoff	Bandon	2-09 - 1-21	Carrigaline	Páirc Uí Riagaín
	C Long (1-5, 4f, 1 65), E McSweeney (1-2), A O Mahony, J McSweeney (0-1 each)	Report	B Kelleher (0-11, 6f), R McCarthy (0-4), F O’Connell (1-0), D Griffin (0-2), D Drake, D Greene and K O’Reilly (0-1 each).	Referee: P Lyons

=== Quarter-finals ===
15 September 2023 Quarter-final	Ballymartle	0-07 - 0-16	Castlelyons	Páirc Uí Rinn
	D McCarthy (2f), S O’Mahony (2f) B Corry 0-2 each, L O’Callaghan 0-1.	Report	A Fenton 0-14 (0-10 f), J Kearney, D Morrison 0-1 each.	Referee: P O'Mahony (Kilbrittain)

17 September 2023 Quarter-final	Valley Rovers	3-12 - 1-22	Kilworth	Caherlag Grounds
	C Butler 1-6 (0-6 f), K Canty 1-2, A Kenneally 1-1, S O’Leary, E Guinnane, C Lyons 0-1 each.	Report	N McNamara 0-7, M Sheehan 0-6 (0-5 f), E Carey 0-5, C Donnellan 1-1, J Sheehan, W Condon, B Sheehan 0-1 each.	Referee: B Barry-Murphy (aghabullogue)

=== Semi-finals ===
30 September 2023 Semi-final	Castlemartyr	0-10 - 2-10	Castlelyons	Clonmult Memorial Park
	M Kelly (0-5, frees), Barry Lawton (0-2), E Martin, C Whyte and A Kelly (0-1 each).	Report	A Spillane (1-2), A Fenton (0-5, 0-3 frees), D Morrisson (1-1), J Kearney and L Doocey (0-1 each).	Referee: M Maher (St Finbarr's)

30 September 2023 Semi-final	Ballincollig	2-16 - 1-20	Kilworth	Riverstown Sportsfield
	C Dorgan 1-3 (0-2 f, 0-1 65), B Keating 1-2, S Wills 0-5 (0-2 f), D O’Sullivan (f) T O’Connell 0-2 each, B Coleman, A Wills 0-1 each.	Report	M Sheehan 0-6 (0-3 f), J Sheehan 0-5, C Donnellan 1-2, L Whelan 0-3, E Carey, N McNamara 0-2 each.	Referee: N O'Neill (Midleton)

=== Final ===
15 October 2023 Final	Kilworth	0-17 - 0-19	Castlelyons	Páirc Uí Chaoimh
	M Sheehan 0-7 (0-6 f), B Sheehan, J Sheehan, E Carey 0-2 each, L Whelan, J Saich, C Donnellan, L Coffey 0-1 each.	Report	A Fenton 0-7 (0-6 f, 0-1 65), L Doocey, A Spillane 0-4 each, K O’Leary 0-2, C Spillane, O Hallihan 0-1 each.	Referee: W King (Banteer)

== Championship statistics ==
=== Top scorers ===
Overall

Rank	Player	County	Tally	Total	Matches	Average
1	Alan Fenton	Castlelyons	0-49	49	6	8.16
2	Brian Kelleher	Carrigaline	3-35	44	4	11.00
3	Colm Butler	Valley Rovers	1-39	42	4	10.50
4	Michael Sheehan	Kilworth	1-34	37	5	7.40
5	Darren McCarthy	Ballymartle	1-31	34	4	8.50
6	Mike Kelly	Castlemartyr	0-29	29	4	7.25
7	Eoin O'Shea	Éire Óg	0-28	28	3	9.33
8	Anthony Spillane	Castlelyons	4-14	26	6	4.33
8	Charlie Long	Bandon	1-23	26	4	6.50
10	Jack Leahy	Dungourney	0-25	25	3	8.33

In a single game

Rank	Player	Club	Tally	Total	Opposition
1	Brian Kelleher	Carrigaline	3-08	17	Éire Óg
2	Alan Fenton	Castlelyons	0-14	14	Ballymartle
3	Darren McCarthy	Ballymartle	0-12	12	Valley Rovers
3	Eoin O'Shea	Éire Óg	0-12	12	Valley Rovers
3	Colm Butler	Valley Rovers	0-12	12	Éire Óg
6	Michael Sheehan	Kilworth	1-08	11	Ballinhassig
6	Brian Kelleher	Carrigaline	0-11	11	Bandon
6	Jack Leahy	Dungourney	0-11	11	Ballincollig
6	Colm Butler	Valley Rovers	0-11	11	Carrigaline
10	Darren McCarthy	Ballymartle	1-07	10	Éire Óg
10	Darren McCarthy	Ballymartle	0-10	10	Carrigaline
10	Colm Butler	Valley Rovers	0-10	10	Ballymartle
10	Alan Fenton	Castlelyons	0-10	10	Dungourney
10	Jack Leahy	Dungourney	0-10	10	Bandon
