= 2026 Cork Premier Intermediate Hurling Championship =

Annual hurling competition season

- Dates: 1 August – 18 October 2026
- Teams: 12
- Sponsor: Co-Op Superstores
- Champions: Ballincollig (1st title); James Dwyer (captain); Éamonn Keating (manager)
- Runners-up: Dungourney; Mike McGrath (captain); Martin Hennessy (manager)
- Relegated: Bishopstown

Tournament statistics
- Matches played: 24
- Goals scored: 74 (3.08 per match)
- Points scored: 894 (37.25 per match)
- Top scorer(s): Brian Kelleher (3–40); Stephen Wills (1–46)

The 2026 Cork Premier Intermediate Hurling Championship was the 23rd staging of the Cork Premier Intermediate Hurling Championship since its establishment by the Cork County Board in 2004. The draw for the group stage placings took place on 9 December 2025. The championship ran from 1 August to 18 October 2026.

The final was played on 18 October 2026 at SuperValu Páirc Uí Chaoimh in Cork, between Ballincollig and Dungourney, in what was their first ever meeting in the final. Ballincollig won the match by 1-19 to 0-16 to claim their first ever championship title.

Brian Kelleher (3–40) and Stephen Wills (1–46) were the championship's top scorers.

== Team changes ==
=== To Championship ===
Relegated from the Cork Senior A Hurling Championship

- Bishopstown

Promoted from the Cork Intermediate A Hurling Championship

- Aghabullogue

=== From Championship ===
Promoted to the Cork Senior A Hurling Championship

- Ballinhassig

Relegated to the Cork Intermediate A Hurling Championship

- Mallow

== Group 1 ==
=== Group 1 table ===
Semi-finalist Quarter-finalist Relegation playoff

Team	Matches				Score			Pts
Team	Pld	W	D	L	For	Against	Diff	Pts
Ballincollig	3	3	0	0	79	59	20	6
Aghabullogue	3	2	0	1	79	64	15	4
Éire Óg	3	1	0	2	58	69	-11	2
Bishopstown (R)	3	0	0	3	48	72	-24	0

=== Group 1 results ===
2 August 2026 Round 1	Bishopstown	2-13 - 1-24	Ballincollig	Páirc Dhónaill Uí Cheallacháin
	J Scally 0-7 (5f), C Murray 1-1 (1f), B Murray 1-1 each, D Quaid 0-2, C Caplice, N O’Shea 0-1 each.	Report	S Wills 0-12 ( 5f, 1 ’65), C O’Driscoll 1-1, T O’Connell 0-4, T Morgan 0-3, A Wills, S O’Neill, B Dore, D O’Leary 0-1 each.

2 August 2026 Round 1	Éire Óg	2-15 - 3-22	Aghabullogue	Cloughduv Grounds
	D Kirwan 0-4 (0-1 f), C O’Callaghan 1-1, S Hurley, E O’Shea Snr 0-3 each, D Foley 1-0, Jerome Kelleher 0-2, D Desmond (0-1 f), K Beechinor 0-1 each.	Report	S Tarrant 2-6, M Bradley 0-8 (0-3 f, 0-1 65), J Lane 1-1, J Corkery 0-3, TJ Buckley, D Dineen, Odhran O’Connell, J Foley 0-1 each.

23 August 2026 Round 2	Ballincollig	2-23 - 1-18	Éire Óg	Ballymartle Grounds
	S Wills 1-10 (1-8 f), J Dwyer, T Morgan 0-3 each, C O’Driscoll 1-0, B Dore, D O’Sullivan 0-2 each, A Wills, D O’Leary, H Ahearne 0-1 each.	Report	D Kirwan 0-12 f, C O’Callaghan 1-1, O O’Shea, J Kelleher, D Clifford, D Foley, D Healy 0-1 each.

23 August 2026 Round 2	Aghabullogue	0-29 - 0-20	Bishopstown	Cloughduv Grounds
	S Tarrant 0-12 (0-6 f, 0-1 65), J Lane 0-6, O O’Connell, P O’Sullivan, D Dineen, J Corkery 0-2 each, C Gillespie, C Furey, S Furey 0-1 each.	Report	C Murray 0-8 (0-7 f), J Scally 0-5 f, C Hegarty, D Quaid, B Murray 0-2 each, C Dunne 0-1.

6 September 2026 Round 3	Ballincollig	2-17 - 1-16	Aghabullogue	Páirc Dhónaill Uí Cheallacháin
	S Wills 0-10 (7f, 0-1 ’65), Danny Miskella, J Dwyer 1-1 each, C O’Driscoll, A Wills 0-2 each, M Oldham 0-1.	Report	S Tarrant 1-6 (6f), D Dineen 0-4, J Lane 0-3, S Furey, J Buckley O ‘O Connell 0-1 each.

6 September 2026 Round 3	Bishopstown	0-09 - 0-16	Éire Óg	Blarney Grounds
	C Murray 0-4 f, J Scally 0-3 (0-2 f), C Hegarty, T Murray 0-1 each.	Report	D Kirwan 0-9 (0-6 f), J Galvin, K Hallissey, C O’Callaghan 0-2 each, D Foley 0-1.

== Group 2 ==
=== Group 2 table ===
Quarter-finalist Relegation playoff

Team	Matches				Score			Pts
Team	Pld	W	D	L	For	Against	Diff	Pts
Cloyne	3	2	0	1	64	51	13	4
Dungourney	3	2	0	1	68	58	10	4
Castlemartyr	3	1	0	2	66	72	-6	2
Lisgoold	3	1	0	2	63	64	-1	2

=== Group 2 results ===
2 August 2026 Round 1	Castlemartyr	3-19 - 1-22	Lisgoold	Clonmult Memorial Park
	B McGann 2-2, Barry Lawton 1-4 (1-0 pen), M Kelly 0-7 (0-3 f, 0-1 65), Brian Lawton 0-3, D Joyce, M O’Dwyer, E Martin 0-1 each.	Report	L O’Shea 0-7 (0-5 f, 0-1 65), D Healy 1-3, J O’Leary 0-5, J Wright 0-4 f, K Cashman, J Cashman, J O’Driscoll 0-1 each.

2 August 2026 Round 1	Dungourney	1-17 - 2-15	Cloyne	Clonmult Memorial Park
	J Leahy 0-7 (0-3f), John Ahern 0-4, C O’Callaghan 1-1, K Coady Byrne, N McGrath, M Leahy, S Hegarty, N Motherway 0-1 each.	Report	J O’Brien 0-8 (0-6f), B O’Shea 1-4 (1-1f), M Cahill 1-0, I Cahill 0-2, B Walsh 0-1.

22 August 2026 Round 2	Lisgoold	0-14 - 1-17	Dungourney	Páirc Shéamuis de Barra
	J O’Leary 0-5 (0-3 f, 0-2 65), D Healy 0-3, J Cronin 0-2, J Coleman, D O’Brien, J Wright (f), L O’Shea (f) 0-1 each.	Report	J Leahy 0-9 (0-4 f), C O’Callaghan 1-2, J Griffin, D Healy, K Cody Byrne, N McGrath, John Ahern, F Daly 0-1 each.

22 August 2026 Round 2	Cloyne	2-13 - 2-09	Castlemartyr	Páirc Shéamuis de Barra
	C Cahill 1-3, N Cahill 1-2, A Lee 0-3, J O’Brien (2 fs), B O’Shea 0-2 each, B Walsh 0-1.	Report	Brian Lawton 2-1, M Kelly 0-4 f, B McGann 0-2, Barry Lawton, N Madden 0-1 each.

6 September 2026 Round 3	Cloyne	1-13 - 2-18	Lisgoold	Ted Haney Memorial Park

6 September 2026 Round 3	Dungourney	4-16 - 2-17	Castlemartyr	Páirc Uí Chinnéide
	J Leahy 0-12 (0-2 ‘65s, 0-3 frees), C O’Callaghan 3-1, K Cody Byrne 1-0, D Healy, S Hegarty, and J Ahern 0-1 each.	Report	Barry Lawton 2-7 (0-3 frees), M Kelly 0-7, (0-2 ‘65s, 0-5 frees), B McGann, Brian Lawton and M O’Dwyer 0-1 each

== Group 3 ==
=== Group 3 table ===
Semi-finalist Quarter-finalist

Team	Matches				Score			Pts
Team	Pld	W	D	L	For	Against	Diff	Pts
Valley Rovers	3	2	0	1	68	56	12	4
Carrigaline	3	1	1	1	79	84	-5	3
Ballymartle	3	1	1	1	73	81	-8	3
Kilworth	3	1	0	2	83	82	1	2

=== Group 3 results ===
1 August 2026 Round 1	Carrigaline	0-17 - 0-28	Valley Rovers	Ballymartle Grounds
	B Kelleher 0-8, E Desmond 0-3, R Kelleher, R McCarthy 0-2 each, C Kearney, D Drake 0-1 each.	Report	C O’Leary 0-13 (0-8 f, 0-1 65), E Crowley 0-4, C Butler 0-3, J Twohig, J Walsh 0-2 each, S Ryan, C O’Shea, B McCarthy, M Woods 0-1 each.

2 August 2026 Round 1	Kilworth	3-26 - 2-20	Ballymartle	Páirc na Bríde
	W Condon 2-3, L Og Hegarty 0-7 (0-3f), J Sheehan 0-6, M Sheehan 0-4, L Carey 1-0, L Whelan 0-3, L Coffey 0-2, D Twomey 0-1.	Report	C Lordan 0-10 (0-6f), L O’Callaghan 1-4, R Sheehan 1-0, S Cummins 0-3, L Hennessy 0-2, R Deasy 0-1.

20 August 2026 Round 2	Valley Rovers	0-20 - 0-18	Kilworth	Páirc Uí Rinn
	C O’Leary 0-8 (0-5 f, 0-2 65), B McCarthy, J Twohig 0-3 each, E Guinane, J Walsh, W Hurley, E Crowley, E O’Shea, S Ryan 0-1 each.	Report	L Óg Hegarty 0-8 (0-7 f), N McNamara 0-3, E Carey (0-1 f), J Sheehan 0-2 each, L Carey, W Condon, B Sheehan 0-1 each.

22 August 2026 Round 2	Ballymartle	3-17 - 3-17	Carrigaline	Kilbrittain Grounds
	C Lordan 1-5 (0-4 f), L Hennessy 0-5, S Cummins 1-2, P Geary 1-0, R Deasy 0-3, F Desmond, S Dorney 0-1 each.	Report	B Kelleher 1-7 (0-5 f), K O’Reilly 1-1, F O’Connell 0-4, R McCarthy, E Desmond 0-2, D Griffin, Kevin Kavanagh, D Drake 0-1 each.

6 September 2026 Round 3	Carrigaline	4-24 - 5-15	Kilworth	Páirc Uí Rinn
	K O’Reilly 3-2, B Kelleher 1-8 (0-4f), F O’Connell 0-5, R McCarthy, R Kelleher 0-2 each, O O’Connell, C Kearney, D Drake, D Griffin 0-1 each.	Report	E Carey 1-4 (1-0f), N McNamara 2-1, L Óg Hegarty 0-6 (0-5f), J Sheehan 1-1, L Carey 1-0, D Twomey, L Coffey 0-1 each.

6 September 2026 Round 3	Valley Rovers	0-20 - 0-21	Ballymartle	Páirc Uí Riagáin
	C O’Leary 0-8 f, B McCarthy 0-5, E O’Shea 0-3, H O’Sullivan 0-2, J Twohig, J Walsh 0-1 each.	Report	C Lordan 0-8 f, L Hennessey 0-4, R Deasy 0-3 (0-1 f), Luke O’Callaghan 0-3, S Cummins 0-2, D Desmond 0-1.

== Relegation stage ==
=== Relegation final ===
19 September 2026 Playoff	Lisgoold	3-19 - 1-17	Bishopstown	Páirc Tadhg Mac Cárthaigh
	L O’Shea 1-3, J Cashman 1-1, I O’Driscoll 1-1, J O’Leary 0-4 (0-3f), J Wright 0-4 (f), K Walsh 0-2, D Healy 0-2, J Cronin, M Hegarty (0-1 each).	Report	J Scally 0-7 (0-4f), C Murray 0-3 (0-2f), D O’Donovan 1-0, S Donnelly-Murphy 0-3 (f), T Murray, C Hegarty, R Foley, D Breen (0-1 each).

== Knockout stage ==
=== Quarter-finals ===
19 September 2026 Quarter-final	Cloyne	2-12 - 0-32	Carrigaline	Páirc Uí Rinn
	J O’Brien 0-6 (0-5f, 0-1 65), B O’Shea 2-0f, A Lee 0-3, C Cahill 0-2, T Cronin 0-1.	Report	B Kelleher 0-10 (0-5f), É Desmond 0-6, O O’Connell, R McCarthy 0-4 each, F O’Connell, D Drake, C Kearney 0-2 each, N Coleman, K O’Reilly 0-1 each.

19 September 2026 Quarter-final	Aghabullogue	3-25 - 3-26 (aet)	Dungourney	Páirc Uí Rinn
	S Tarrant 0-9 (0-6f), J Lane 1-4, M Bradley 1-2, J Foley 0-4, D Dineen 1-1, S Feury 0-2, O O’Connell, L Casey, M Dennehy 0-1 each.	Report	J Leahy (0-4f, 0-1 65) 0-9, John Ahern 0-8 (0-2f, 0-1 65), C O’Callaghan 2-2, J Griffin 1-0, F Daly, S Hegarty 0-2 each, D Healy, K Coady Byrne, C Griffin 0-1 each.

=== Semi-finals ===
3 October 2026 Semi-final	Ballincollig	1-25 - 2-19	Carrigaline	Éire Óg Grounds
	S Wills 0-8 (0-4 f, 0-1 65), B Keating 1-2, D Miskella 0-4, D O’Mahony, T Morgan 0-3 each, P Kelly, K O’Leary, D O’Leary, A Wills, C O’Driscoll 0-1 each.	Report	B Kelleher 1-7 (1-0 pen, 0-3 f, 0-2 65) F O’Connell 1-3, E Desmond, K O’Reilly 0-3 each, D Drake 0-2, R McCarthy 0-1.

3 October 2026 Semi-final	Valley Rovers	1-15 - 2-14	Dungourney	Páirc Dhónaill Uí Cheallacháin
	E Crowley 1-2, C O’Leary 0-5 (4f, 0-1 65), J Walsh, W Hurley 0-2 each, A Kenneally, E Guinane, S Ryan, J Twohig 0-1 each.	Report	C O’Callaghan 1-2, J Ahern 0-4 f, D Healy 1-0, C Griffin, J Leahy 0-2 each, K Coady Byrne, N McGragh, F Daly, M Leahy 0-1 each.

=== Final ===
18 October 2026 Final	Dungourney	0-16 - 1-19	Ballincollig	SuperValu Páirc Uí Chaoimh
	J Leahy 0-7 (0-3 f, 0-1 65), K Coady Byrne 0-3, S Hegarty, John Ahern 0-2 each, C Griffin, C O’Callaghan 0-1 each.	Report	S Wills 0-6 (0-1 f), A Wills 1-1, C O’Driscoll, T Morgan 0-3 each, R O’Donovan, F Denny, D O’Mahony, B Keating, P Kelly, H Ahearne 0-1 each.

== Championship statistics ==
=== Top scorers ===
Rank	Player	Club	Tally	Total	Matches	Average
1	Brian Kelleher	Carrigaline	3-40	49	5	9.80
1	Stephen Wills	Ballincollig	1-46	49	5	9.80
3	Jack Leahy	Dungourney	0-46	46	6	7.66
4	Shane Tarrant	Aghabullogue	3-33	42	4	10.50
5	Cillian O'Callaghan	Dungourney	8-09	33	6	5.60
6	Chris O'Leary	Valley Rovers	0-34	34	4	8.50
7	Cillian Lordan	Ballymartle	1-23	26	3	8.66
8	David Kirwan	Éire Óg	0-25	25	3	8.33
9	Barry Lawton	Castlemartyr	3-12	21	3	7.00
9	Liam Óg Hegarty	Kilworth	0-21	21	3	7.00
