= 2005 Cork Premier Intermediate Hurling Championship =

- Dates: 30 April 2005 – 1 October 2005
- Teams: 16
- Champions: Ballinhassig (1st title); Martin Coleman, Jnr (captain)
- Runners-up: Aghada

Tournament statistics
- Matches played: 28
- Goals scored: 62 (2.21 per match)
- Points scored: 665 (23.75 per match)
- Top scorer(s): Trevor O'Keeffe (1-45)

The 2005 Cork Premier Intermediate Hurling Championship was the second staging of the Cork Premier Intermediate Hurling Championship since its establishment by the Cork County Board. The draw for the opening round fixtures took place at the Cork Convention on 12 December 2004. The championship began on 30 April 2005 and ended on 1 October 2005.

On 1 October 2005, Ballinhassig won the championship following a 1-16 to 1-11 defeat of Aghada in the final. This was their first championship title in the grade.

Aghada's Trevor O'Keeffe was the championship's top scorer with 1-45.

== Results ==
=== Round 1 ===
30 April 2005 Round 1	Inniscarra	1-12 - 0-14	Ballincollig	Knockanemore Sportsfield, Ovens
	N O'Regan 0-4, D Olden 1-0, J Olden 0-3, J O'Mahony 0-1, J Casey 0-1, A O'Mahony 0-1, S Olden 0-1, G Burke 0-1.		A Beale 0-4, P O'Mahony 0-3, J Miskella 0-2, D Beale 0-2, R O'Doherty 0-2, J O'Brien 0-1.	Referee: R Murphy (Lyre)

1 May 2005 Round 1	St. Finbarr's	1-08 - 2-10	Tracton	Páirc Liam Mhic Cárthaigh, Ballygarvan
	K Kelleher 0-6, T Olden 1-0, E Fitzpatrick 0-2.		J Kingston 1-2, F Walsh 0-5, R Walsh 1-1, F Lynch 0-1, S McCarthy 0-1.	Referee: C McAllister (Midleton)

1 May 2005 Round 1	Aghabullogue	3-09 - 2-12	Mallow	Banteer Sportsfield, Banteer
	P Finnegan 2-1, N Buckley 1-1, D Twomey 0-2, K Finnegan 0-2, T Buckley 0-2, D Kiely 0-1.		P Dineen 1-7, F McCormack 1-4, D Kerrisk 0-1.	Referee: J Kearney (Na Piarsaigh)

1 May 2005 Round 1	Carrigtwohill	2-08 - 4-12	Courcey Rovers	Páirc Uí Rinn, Cork
	E O'Mahony 2-4, J Barrett 0-2, M Fitzgerald 0-1, N McCarthy 0-1.		V Hurley 1-7, J Murphy 2-2, S Hurley 1-0, N Murphy 0-2, K Moloney 0-1.	Referee: M Myers (Whitechurch)

7 May 2005 Round 1	Newcestown	1-06 - 0-10	Ballyhea	Ballyanly Sportsfield, Inniscarra
	G O'Driscoll 0-5, B O'Mahony 1-0, D Heffernan 0-1.		M O'Sullivan 0-4, N Ronan 0-3, D Ronan 0-3.	Referee: J Kearney (Na Piarsaigh)

8 May 2005 Round 1	Blarney	1-07 - 1-07	Ballinhassig	Páirc Uí Rinn, Cork
	D McCarthy 1-1, J Hurley 0-3, R McNamara 0-1, C Sheehan 0-1, J Hughes 0-1.		D O'Callaghan 1-0, J Mullaney 0-3, F O'Leary 0-3, J O'Sullivan 0-1.	Referee: C McAllister (Midleton)

8 May 2008 Round 1	Youghal	2-09 - 0-15	Watergrasshill	Jamesy Kelleher Park, Dungourney
	B Coleman 1-1, E Coleman 1-1, D Ring 0-3, A Murphy 0-1, Brendan Ring 0-1, JP Joyce 0-1, M Ó Laochadha 0-1.		P O'Regan 0-4, P Cahill 0-3, S O'Leary 0-2, J Halbert 0-2, S O'Callaghan 0-1, R Cahill 0-1, W O'Leary 0-1, E O'Reilly 0-1.	Referee: K Healy (Ballymartle)

8 May 2005 Round 1 replay	Aghabullogue	0-16 - 1-15 (aet)	Mallow	Banteer Sportsfield, Banteer
	K Finnegan 0-6, T Buckley 0-4, E Twomey 0-2, D O'Leary 0-1, D Kiely 0-1, J Foley 0-1, P Finnegan 0-1.		P Dineen 0-7, M Buckley 1-0, F McCormack 0-3, R Galvin 0-2, J Hayes 0-1, R O'Connell 0-1, D Kerrisk 0-1.	Referee: J Kearney (Na Piarsaigh)

14 May 2005 Round 1	Bishopstown	0-14 - 2-11	Aghada	Páirc Uí Chonaill, Cobh
	P Cronin 0-8, R Conway 0-3, B Healy 0-1, J Murphy 0-1, S O'Neill 0-1.		T O'Keeffe 0-7, T Wall 1-1, P O'Neill 1-0, G Melvin 0-1, R Dwane 0-1, S O'Keeffe 0-1.	Referee: D Farrell (Mitchelstown)

14 May 2005 Round 1 replay	Blarney	3-13 - 1-15	Ballinhassig	Páirc Uí Rinn, Cork
	J Hurley 1-7, R McNamara 1-2, N Murphy 1-1, D McCarthy 0-1, D Cronin 0-1, E McCarthy 0-1.		F O'Leary 0-6, B Lombard 1-2, J Mullaney 0-2, S Dineen 0-1, D O'Callaghan 0-1, M Aherne 0-1, D Dineen 0-1, B O'Sullivan 0-1.	Referee: C McAllister (Midleton)

11 June 2008 Round 1 replay	Youghal	1-14 - 1-13	Watergrasshill	Jamesy Kelleher Park, Dungourney
	E Coleman 1-5, B Ring 0-3, D Ring 0-2, L Desmond 0-2, M Ó Laochadha 0-1, B Coleman 0-1.		J Foley 1-0, P Cahill 0-3, J Halbert 0-3, E O'Reilly 0-2, P O'Regan 0-2, S O'Callaghan 0-1, S O'Leary 0-1, N O'Riordan 0-1.	Referee: K Healy (Ballymartle)

=== Round 2 ===
26 May 2005 Round 2	St. Finbarr's	4-03 - 1-11	Newcestown	Páirc Liam Mhic Cárthaigh, Ballygarvan
	R Maher 2-1, J McCarthy 1-0, S Barry 1-0, N Kelleher 0-3.		G O'Driscoll 0-4, C Crowley 1-0, P Kenneally 0-3, J O'Sullivan 0-1, P Condon 0-1, C Keane 0-1, H Curran 0-1.	Referee: P Downey (Inniscarra)

17 June 2005 Round 2	Ballincollig	0-12 - 1-15	Watergrasshill	Páirc Séamus de Barra, Carrigtwohill
	D Twohig 0-7, R Doherty 0-1, D Bowen 0-1, J Miskella 0-1, A O'Donovan 0-1, D Beale 0-1.		J Halbert 0-6, P Cahill 1-1, W O'Leary 0-4, P O'Regan 0-3, N O'Riordan 0-1.	Referee: A Cummins (Ballymartle)

2 July 2005 Round 2	Aghabullogue	1-11 - 0-14	Bishopstown	Cloughduv
	K Finnegan 0-8, D O'Leary 1-1, Dan Twomey 0-1, T Buckley 0-1.		P Cronin 0-5, R Conway 0-4, T Murray 0-2, S Coughlan 0-1, S O'Neill 0-1, J Murphy 0-1.	Referee: D Farrell (Mitchelstown)

2 July 2005 Round 2	Ballinhassig	1-15 - 1-09	Carrigtwohill	Páirc Uí Chaoimh, Cork
	D Dineen 0-8, S Dineen 1-0, D O'Sullivan 0-3, D O'Callaghan 0-2, F O'Leary 0-2.		L Barry 1-1, M Fitzgerald 0-4, Seánie O'Farrell 0-2, J Barrett 0-1, N McCarthy 0-1.	Referee: D Copps (Ballyhea)

17 July 2005 Round 2 replay	Aghabullogue	0-07 - 3-20	Bishopstown	Cloughduv
	P Finnegan 0-4, D O'Leary 0-2, K Finnegan 0-1.		R Conway 0-8, P Cronin 0-7, T Murray 1-1, S O'Neill 1-1, C Doyle 1-0, E Mawe 0-1, D Crowley 0-1, E Joyce 0-1.	Referee: D Farrell (Mitchelstown)

=== Round 3 ===
2 July 2005 Round 3	Blarney	0-10 - 0-06	Inniscarra	Cloughduv
	J Hurley 0-5, J Hughes 0-3, G O'Donovan 0-1, E McCarthy 0-1.		D O'Connell 0-3, Nicky O'Riordan 0-3.	Referee: C McAllister (Midleton)

3 July 2005 Round 3	Ballyhea	2-13 - 1-11	Watergrasshill	Gorteenaboul
	N Ronan 2-8, M O'Sullivan 0-3, A Crowley 0-1, J O'Sullivan 0-1.		P O'Regan 1-3, J Halbert 0-4, P Cahill 0-1, I Gardiner 0-1, W O'Leary 0-1, S O'Leary 0-1.	Referee: M Myers (Whitechurch)

15 July 2005 Round 3	Youghal	1-16 - 1-11	St. Finbarr's	Páirc Liam Uí Riain, Aghada
	L Desmond 1-7, Barry Ring 0-3, D Ring 0-2, J Grace 0-1, M Ó Laochadha 0-1, B Coleman 0-1, P Mackey 0-1.		C Duffy 1-1, A Kelly 0-3, K Kelleher 0-2, J McCarthy 0-2, P Crowley 0-1, R O'Mahony 0-1, P Harte 0-1.	Referee: D Farrell (Mitchelstown)

16 July 2005 Round 3	Tracton	0-12 - 0-17	Aghada	Church Road, Blackrock
	R Walsh 0-8, R Cronin 0-1, K Corrigan 0-1,		T O'Keeffe 0-10, G Melvin 0-2, B Morrissey 0-1, S O'Keeffe 0-1, B Hennessy 0-1, P Cashman 0-1, P O'Neill 0-1.

=== Quarter-finals ===
16 July 2005 Quarter-finals	Courcey Rovers	1-12 - 0-16	Ballinhassig	Riverstick
	V Hurley 1-3, N Murphy 0-4, M O'Donovan 0-2, D Twomey 0-1, S Hurley 0-1, J Murphy 0-1.		D Dineen 0-10, S Dineen 0-3, J Mullaney 0-2, K O'Sullivan 0-1.	Referee: D Kirwan (Éire Óg)

31 August 2005 Quarter-finals	Bishopstown	4-07 - 2-15	Mallow	Páirc Uí Rinn, Cork
	T Murray 1-3, D Crowley 1-0, C Doyle 1-0, J Murphy 1-0, P Cronin 0-3, S O'Neill 0-1.		P Dineen 1-5, F McCormack 0-8, R O'Connell 1-0, P Heffernan 0-1, T O'Riordan 0-1.	Referee: D O'Flynn (Fr. O'Neill's)

20 August 2005 Quarter-finals	Ballyhea	0-14 - 0-15	Youghal	Castlelyons
	M O'Sullivan 0-9, D Ronan 0-4, I Curtin 0-1.		E Coleman 0-6, L Desmond 0-4, B Ring 0-3, D Ring 0-2.	Referee: C Lyons (Nemo Rangers)

3 September 2005 Quarter-finals	Aghada	0-16 - 1-06	Blarney	Páirc Uí Rinn, Cork
	T O'Keeffe 0-8, S O'Keeffe 0-3, B Morrissey 0-1, G Melvin 0-1, P O'Neill 0-1, B Hennessy 0-1, P Wall 0-1.		E McCarthy 1-0, J Hurley 0-3, R McNamara 0-1, J Hughes 0-1, S O'Donoghue 0-1.	Referee: M Myers (Whitechurch)

=== Semi-finals ===
18 September 2005 Semi-final	Aghada	1-16 - 2-13	Youghal	Páirc Uí Chaoimh, Cork
	T O'Keeffe 1-7, S O'Keeffe 0-2, B Hennessy 0-1, B Morrissey 0-1, T Wall 0-1, G Melvin 0-1, P O'Neill 0-1, P Wall 0-1, D Creedon 0-1.		E Coleman 0-9, L Desmond 2-1, D Ring 0-2, Brendan Ring 0-1.	Referee: C Lyons (Nemo Rangers)

18 September 2005 Semi-final	Ballinhassig	1-17 - 0-14	Mallow	Páirc Uí Chaoimh, Cork
	D Dineen 0-7, F O'Leary 1-3, S Dineen 0-2, D O'Callaghan 0-1, D Brennan 0-1, D O'Sullivan 0-1, D Duggan 0-1, J O'Sullivan 0-1.		P Dineen 0-8, F McCormack 0-3, M Buckley 0-2, M Maher 0-1.	Referee: C McAllister (Midleton)

24 September 2005 Semi-final	Aghada	2-07 - 0-07	Youghal	Páirc Uí Chaoimh, Cork
	S O'Keeffe 1-2, T O'Keeffe 0-4, D Creedon 1-0, B Morrissey 0-1.		E Coleman 0-3, J Grace 0-1, D Ring 0-1, Brendan Ring 0-1.	Referee: C Lyons (Nemo Rangers)

=== Final ===
1 October 2005 Final	Ballinhassig	1-16 - 1-11	Aghada	Páirc Uí Rinn, Cork
	F O'Leary 1-2, D O'Callaghan 0-4, D Dineen 0-2, M Ahern 0-2, B Lombard 0-2, S Dineen 0-2, J Mullaney 0-1, D O'Sullivan 0-1.		T O'Keeffe 0-9, D Creedon 1-0, B Morrissey 0-1, J Connolly 0-1.	Referee: D Copps (Ballyhea)

== Championship statistics ==
=== Top scorers ===
Top scorer overall

Rank	Player	Club	Tally	Total	Matches	Average
1	Trevor O'Keeffe	Aghada	1-45	48	6	8.00
2	Pa Dineen	Mallow	2-27	33	4	8.25
3	Eoin Coleman	Youghal	2-24	30	5	6.00
4	Darren Dineen	Ballinhassig	0-28	28	6	4.66
5	Leigh Desmond	Youghal	3-14	23	4	5.75
5	Pa Cronin	Bishopstown	0-23	23	4	5.75
6	Fintan O'Leary	Ballinhassig	2-16	22	6	3.66
7	Fergal McCormack	Mallow	1-18	21	4	5.25
8	Neil Ronan	Ballyhea	2-11	17	3	5.66
9	Johnny Hurley	Blarney	1-18	21	4	5.25

Top scorers in a single game

Rank	Player	Club	Tally	Total	Opposition
1	Neil Ronan	Ballyhea	2-08	14	Watergrasshill
2	Eoin O'Mahony	Carrigtwohill	2-04	10	Courcey Rovers
2	Pa Dineen	Mallow	1-07	10	Aghabullogue
2	Vincent Hurley	Courcey Rovers	1-07	10	Carrigtwohill
2	Johnny Hurley	Blarney	1-07	10	Ballinhassig
2	Leigh Desmond	Youghal	1-07	10	St. Finbarr's
2	Trevor O'Keeffe	Aghada	1-07	10	Youghal
2	Darren Dineen	Ballinhassig	0-10	10	Courcey Rovers
2	Trevor O'Keeffe	Aghada	0-10	10	Tracton
3	Maurice O'Sullivan	Ballyhea	0-09	9	Youghal
3	Eoin Coleman	Youghal	0-09	9	Aghada
3	Trevor O'Keeffe	Aghada	0-09	9	Ballinhassig

=== Miscellaneous ===
- Ballinhassig's championship victory secured their promotion to the senior grade for the first time since 1976.
- Ballinhassig win their first Premier Intermediate title.
