= 2007 Cork Premier Intermediate Hurling Championship =

- Dates: 4 May 2007 – 14 October 2007
- Teams: 16
- Champions: Carrigtwohill (1st title); Jason Barrett (captain); Dermot O'Riordan (manager)
- Runners-up: Watergrasshill; Patrick O'Regan (captain); Éamonn Ryan (manager)

Tournament statistics
- Matches played: 27
- Top scorer(s): Ronan Walsh (5-30)

The 2007 Cork Premier Intermediate Hurling Championship was the fourth staging of the Cork Premier Intermediate Hurling Championship since its establishment by the Cork County Board in 2004.

On 14 October 2007, Carrigtwohill won the championship following a 3-14 to 3-12 defeat of Watergrasshill in the final. This was their first championship title in the grade.

== Results ==
=== Round 1 ===
4 May 2007 Round 1	Courcey Rovers	1-14 - 2-11	Tracton	Riverstick
	V Hurley 0-7, N Murphy 1-1, J Murphy 0-2, D Hayes 0-2, T Collins 0-1.		R Walsh 1-7, J Kingston 1-2, F Walsh 0-2.	Referee: D Kirwan (Éire Óg)

5 May 2007 Round 1	Inniscarra	1-12 - 0-12	Youghal	Caherlag
	N O'Regan 0-6, D Holland 1-1, D O'Connell 0-2, J Olden 0-1, S Olden 0-1, A O'Mahony 0-1.		L Desmond 0-8, B Ring 0-2, B Coleman 0-1, E Coleman 0-1.	Referee: P O'Neill (Shamrocks)

6 May 2007 Round 1	Ballincollig	2-14 - 0-11	Newcestown	Cloughduv
	J Dwyer 1-7, R O'Driscoll 1-1, R O'Doherty 0-3, J O'Brien 0-1, A Beale 0-1, D Bowen 0-1.		G O'Driscoll 0-8, H Curran 0-2, F Keane 0-1.	Referee: G Harrington (Carrigaline)

6 May 2007 Round 1	Blarney	0-13 - 1-11	Aghabullogue	Ballynaly Sportsfield, Inniscarra
	M McCarthy 0-7, P Ahern 0-1, D Cronin 0-1, B Hurley 0-1, R McNamara 0-1, R Byrne 0-1, J Hurley 0-1.		Dan Twomey 1-2, Donal Twomey 0-2, B Kiely 0-2, K Finnegan 0-2, N Buckley 0-1, Pa Finnegan 0-1, D Moynihan 0-1.	Referee: N Barrett (Carrigtwohill)

6 May 2007 Round 1	Delaneys	0-10 - 1-14	Ballyhea	Castletownroche
	K Foley 0-3, E Cullinane 0-2, P Finnegan 0-2, M McElhinney 0-1, C Foley 0-1, M O'Driscoll 0-1.		M O'Sullivan 1-3, B Coleman 0-3, A Crowley 0-2, L O'Connor 0-2, E Morrissey 0-1, J O'Sullivan 0-1, G Morrissey 0-1, I Ronan 0-1.	Referee: C Lane (Banteer)

6 May 2007 Round 1	Ballymartle	0-22 - 0-11	Argideen Rangers	Jack Barrett Park, Kinsale
	G Cummins 0-6, M O'Mahony 0-5, B Coleman 0-4, B Corry 0-2, R Dwyer 0-2, S Coleman 0-1, B Dwyer 0-1, D Dwyer 0-1.		M O'Callaghan 0-6, S O'Mahony 0-3, J Dineen 0-1, D Crowley 0-1.	Referee: D Ó Muineacháin

6 May 2007 Round 1	Mallow	2-06 - 0-14	Watergrasshill	Ballyhooly
	P Dineen 1-1, F Hayes 1-0, J Hayes 0-3, T O'Riordan 0-1, F McCormack 0-1.		J Halbert 0-8, P O'Regan 0-3, E O'Reilly 0-1, P Cahill 0-1, S O'Callaghan 0-1.	Referee: M Harrington (Carrigaline)

6 May 2007 Round 1	Carrigtwohill	3-13 - 1-09	Aghada	Castlemartyr
	N McCarthy 0-8, R White 2-1, M Barry 1-0, B Lordan 0-2, M O'Riordan 0-1, D Collins 0-1.		K O'Connor 1-0, T O'Keeffe 0-3, B Morrissey 0-2, B Hennessy 0-1, S O'Keeffe 0-1, P O'Neill 0-1, V Morrissey 0-1.	Referee: J Sexton (Ballyhea)

15 May 2007 Round 1 replay	Courcey Rovers	2-12 - 3-07	Tracton	Riverstick
	V Hurley 0-9, C Lordan 1-0, T Collins 1-0, D Twomey 0-1, B Hayes 0-1, N Murphy 0-1.		R Walsh 2-4, K Lynch 1-2, P Walsh 0-1.	Referee: J Dorgan (Nemo Rangers)

=== Round 2 ===
20 May 2007 Round 2	Argideen Rangers	0-16 - 1-11	Newcestown	Charlie Hurley Park, Bandon
	M O'Callaghan 0-7, S O'Mahony 0-7, J Murphy 0-1, M Walsh 0-1.		G O'Driscoll 1-6, F Keane 0-2, N O'Sullivan 0-1, C O'Donovan 0-1, P Condon 0-1.	Referee: D O'Leary (Cloughduv)

23 May 2007 Round 2	Aghada	1-08 - 1-13	Blarney	Riverstown
	T O'Keeffe 0-4, M Galvin 1-0, V Morrissey 0-2, S O'Keeffe 0-1, B Morrissey 0-1.		S O'Donoghue 0-6, M McCarthy 0-4, R McNamara 1-0, P Ahern 0-2, D McCarthy 0-1.	Referee: C Lyons (Nemo Rangers)

2 June 2007 Round 2	Mallow	3-10 - 3-11	Tracton	Páirc Uí Rinn, Cork
	B Murphy 2-4, P Dineen 0-5, D Hayes 1-0, D Kerrisk 0-1.		R Walsh 1-5, F Lynch 1-1, D Walsh 1-0, S O'Sullivan 0-3, R Cronin 0-1, J Kingston 0-1.	Referee: C Lyons (Nemo Rangers)

10 June 2007 Round 2	Delaneys	2-11 - 1-18	Youghal	Clonmult Memorial Park, Midleton
	P Finnegan 0-8, G Quinlan 1-0, B Ahern 1-0, K Foley 0-1, M O'Driscoll 0-1, E Cullinane 0-1.		L Desmond 0-9, B Ring 1-2, E Coleman 0-2, N Roche 0-2, D Ring 0-2, R Cunningham 0-1.	Referee: A Cummins (Ballymartle)

=== Relegation play-offs ===
29 June 2007 Semi-final	Newcestown	2-22 - 2-11	Delaneys	Brinny Sportsfield, Brinny
	P Condon 2-2, E Kelly 0-7, F Keane 0-6, G O'Driscoll 0-4, C Keane 0-2, C o'Donovan 0-1.		M O'Driscoll 1-2, P O'Connell 1-0, K Foley 0-3, P Finnegan 0-3, E Cullinane 0-1, T Kiely 0-1, C Foley 0-1.	Referee: S Collins (Carrigaline)

6 October 2007 Semi-final	Aghada	1-17 - 1-11	Mallow	Castlelyons
	T O'Keeffe 0-9, J Connolly 1-0, P O'Neill 0-3, V Morrissey 0-2, S O'Keeffe 0-2, B Crowley 0-1.		P Dineen 1-6, C Moloney 0-3, B Murphy 0-2.	Referee: D O'Leary (Cloughduv)

27 October 2007 Final	Mallow	2-22 - 0-03	Delaneys	Páirc Mac Gearailt, Fermoy
	P Dineen 0-9, B Murphy 1-1, M Buckley 1-1, F McCormack 0-4, J Hayes 0-2, C Moloney 0-2, M Maher 0-1, B Carey 0-1, D Kerrisk 0-1.		M O'Driscoll 0-2, P O'Connell 0-1.	Referee: P Downey (Inniscarra)

=== Round 3 ===
15 June 2007 Round 3	Blarney	0-15 - 1-08	Argideen Rangers	Innishannon
	J Hurley 0-5, D McCarthy 0-3, P Ahern 0-2, M McCarthy 0-1, B Deasy 0-1, R McNamara 0-1, E McCarthy 0-1, J Hughes 0-1.		S O'Mahony 0-4, A O'Leary 1-0, M Walsh 0-2, M Harte 0-1, M O'Callaghan 0-1.	Referee: C Lyons (Nemo Rangers)

16 June 2015 Round 3	Inniscarra	0-10 - 2-10	Tracton	Páirc Uí Rinn, Cork
	N O'Regan 0-6, S Olden 0-2, J Casey 0-1, D O'Connell 0-1.		R Walsh 1-8, P Kingston 1-0, S Sullivan 0-1, D Walsh 0-1.	Referee: J Sexton (Ballyhea)

23 June 2007 Round 3	Youghal	1-11 - 3-12	Watergrasshill	Ballynoe
	L Desmond 1-9 (0-7 frees), B Ring and R Cunningham 0-1 each.		S O’Leary 2-0, P Cahill 1-2, J Halbert 0-3 (0-1 free), P O’Regan (0-1 free, 0-1 65) and P O’Brien 0-2 each, E Barry, E O’Reilly and I Gardiner 0-1 each.

25 August 2007 Round 3	Ballyhea	1-13 - 0-13	Ballincollig
	N Ronan 0-8, T Shanahan 1-0, A O'Connor 0-1, G Morrissey 0-1, E Morrissey 0-1, M O'Sullivan 0-1, D Ronan 0-1.		J Dwyer 0-6, R O'Doherty 0-2, R O'Driscoll 0-2, D Bowen 0-1, D Murphy 0-1, J Miskella 0-1.	Referee: G O'Connell (Lisgoold)

=== Quarter-finals ===
14 July 2007 Quarter-final	Ballymartle	4-13 - 2-13	Courcey Rovers	Jack Barrett Park, Kinsale
	B Corry 2-2, G Cummins 1-5, M O'Mahony 1-0, P Coughlan 0-2, R Dwyer 0-2, B Dwyer 0-1, B Coleman 0-1.		C Lordan 1-1, J Murphy 1-1, V Hurley 0-4, N Murphy 0-2, D Murphy 0-1, B Hayes 0-1, S Hayes 0-1, M O'Donovan 0-1, T Collins 0-1.	Referee: D O'Leary (Cloughduv)

15 July 2007 Quarter-final	Blarney	4-13 - 3-12	Tracton	Páirc Uí Rinn, Cork
	R McNamara 3-0, J Hurley 0-6, B Deasy 1-0, B Hurley 0-2, M Cremin 0-2, G O'Donovan 0-1, P Nodwell 0-1, P Ahern 0-1.		S Sullivan 2-2, R Walsh 0-6, M Sullivan 1-1, F Walsh 0-1, K Corrigan 0-1, C Lordan 0-1.	Referee: G O'Connell (Lisgoold)

19 August 2007 Quarter-final	Carrigtwohill	1-24 - 2-11	Aghabullogue	Páirc Uí Rinn, Cork
	N McCarthy 0-10, R White 1-4, S Dineen 0-3, Séamus O'Farrell 0-2, Seánie O'Farrell 0-1, F Flannery 0-1, R Power 0-1, M Barry 0-1, M O'Riordan 0-1.		Donal Twomey 1-4, K Finnegan 0-5, Dan Twomey 1-0, P Finnegan 0-2.	Referee: J Dorgan (Nemo Rangers)

1 September 2007 Quarter-final	Watergrasshill	1-22 - 1-08	Ballyhea	Castletownroche
	J Halbert 0-10, S O'Leary 1-0, F Usanga 0-3, E O'Reilly 0-2, P O'Brien 0-2, W O'Leary 0-2, P O'Regan 0-2, G Cahill 0-1.		N Ronan 0-4, E Morrissey 1-0, D Ronan 0-2, E Rea 0-1, M O'Sullivan 0-1.	Referee: J Dorgan (Nemo Rangers)

=== Semi-finals ===
14 September 2007 Semi-final	Watergrasshill	1-12 - 1-09	Blarney	Páirc Uí Rinn, Cork
	P O'Regan 1-4, J Halbert 0-5, W O'Leary 0-2, S O'Leary 0-1.		R McNamara 1-1, J Hurley 0-4, D McCarthy 0-2, S O'Donoghue 0-1, P Ahern 0-1.	Referee: J Kearney (Na Piarsaigh)

14 September 2007 Semi-final	Carrigtwohill	4-11 - 1-19	Ballymartle	Páirc Uí Rinn, Cork
	R White 2-0, N McCarthy 0-6, Seánie O'Farrell 1-0, B Lordan 1-0, S Flannery 0-1, J Barrett 0-1, Séamus O'Farrell 0-1, S Dineen 0-1, S Barry 0-1.		B Corry 0-8, R Dwyer 0-4, G Cummins 1-0, M O'Mahony 0-3, P Coughlan 0-2, B Dwyer 0-1, P Dwyer 0-1.	Referee: C Lyons (Nemo Rangers)

=== Final ===
14 October 2007 Final	Carrigtwohill	3-14 - 3-12	Watergrasshill	Páirc Uí Chaoimh, Cork
	Seánie O'Farrell 3-1, N McCarthy 0-9, R White 0-2, B Lordan 0-2.		J Halbert 1-3, P O'Riordan 1-2, P Cahill 0-4, E O'Reilly 1-0, W O'Leary 0-1, J O'Keeffe 0-1, N O'Riordan 0-1.	Referee: J Sexton (Ballyhea)

== Championship statistics ==
=== Top scorers ===
Top scorer overall

Rank	Player	Club	Tally	Total	Matches	Average
1	Ronan Walsh	Tracton	5-30	45	5	9.00
2	Niall McCarthy	Carrigtwohill	0-33	33	4	8.25
3	John Halbert	Watergrasshill	1-29	32	5	6.40
4	Leigh Desmond	Youghal	1-26	29	3	9.66
5	Pa Dineen	Mallow	2-21	27	4	6.75
6	Robbie White	Carrigtwohill	5-07	22	4	5.50
7	Ger O'Driscoll	Newcestown	1-18	21	3	7.33
8	Vince Hurley	Courcey Rovers	0-20	20	3	6.66
9	Ross McNamara	Blarney	5-03	18	5	5.60
9	Brian Corry	Ballymartle	2-12	18	3	6.00

Top scorers in a single game

Rank	Player	Club	Tally	Total	Opposition
1	Leigh Desmond	Youghal	1-09	12	Watergrasshill
2	Ronan Walsh	Tracton	1-08	11	Inniscarra
3	Seánie O'Farrell	Carrigtwohill	3-01	10	Watergrasshill
3	Ronan Walsh	Tracton	2-04	10	Courcey Rovers
3	Barry Murphy	Mallow	2-04	10	Tracton
3	Ronan Walsh	Tracton	1-07	10	Courcey Rovers
3	John O'Dwyer	Ballincollig	1-07	10	Newcestown
3	Niall McCarthy	Carrigtwohill	0-10	10	Aghabullogue
3	John Halbert	Watergrasshill	0-10	10	Ballyhea
4	Ross McNamara	Blarney	3-00	9	Tracton
4	Ger O'Driscoll	Newcestown	1-06	9	Argideen Rangers
4	Pa Dineen	Mallow	1-06	9	Aghada
4	Vincie Hurley	Courcey Rovers	0-09	9	Tracton
4	Leigh Desmond	Youghal	0-09	9	Delaneys
4	Trevor O'Keeffe	Aghada	0-09	9	Mallow
4	Pa Dineen	Mallow	0-09	9	Delaneys
4	Niall McCarthy	Carrigtwohill	0-09	9	Watergrasshill

=== Miscellaneous ===
- Carrigtwohill their first Premier Intermediate title.
