= Martin Coleman Jnr =

Irish hurler

Martin Coleman
Personal information
- Native name: Máirtín Ó Colmáin (Irish)
- Born: 15 February 1983 (age 43) Ballinhassig, County Cork, Ireland
- Height: 6 ft 0 in (183 cm)

Sport
- Sport: Hurling
- Position: Goalkeeper
Clubs
- Years: Club
- Ballinhassig; Carrigdhoun
Club titles
- Cork titles: 0
College
- Years: College
- Cork Institute of Technology
College titles
- Fitzgibbon titles: 0
Inter-county*
Years	County	Apps (scores)
2003-2012	Cork	1 (0-00)
Inter-county titles
- Munster titles: 3
- All-Irelands: 2
- NHL: 0
- All Stars: 0
- *Inter County team apps and scores correct as of 22:35, 24 July 2018.

Martin Coleman Jnr (born 15 February 1983) is an Irish hurler who plays as a goalkeeper for club side Ballinhassig, divisional side Carrigdhoun and formerly at inter-county level with the Cork senior hurling team.

== Early life ==
Coleman was born in Ballinhassig, County Cork. His father, Martin Coleman Snr, won All-Ireland medals as goalkeeper on Cork's three-in-a-row teams of 1976 to 1978.

== Playing career ==
=== Post-primary School ===
Coleman spent his schooling in Cork College of Commerce. He represented the school by coming into an All-Ireland Vocational Schools Championship Final with Cork vs Galway

=== Club ===
Coleman joined the Ballinhassig club at a young age and played in all grades at juvenile and underage levels, winning three successive divisional championship titles in the minor grade between 1998 and 2000.In 1998 they got to the Minor A County Final losing out to Erin's Own 1–12 to 1-05. By this stage he had already joined the club's junior team as goalkeeper. In 2000, Coleman won his first South East Championship title following a 1–10 to 1–09 defeat of Courcey Rovers in the final. On 12 November 2000, Coleman was in goal when Ballinhassig were defeated by Nemo Rangers by 2–08 to 1–10 in the County Junior Championship final.

Coleman won a second South East Championship title in 2002 after a 2–07 to 0–08 defeat of Carrigaline in the final. On 17 November 2002, he won a County Junior Championship medal after a 2–12 to 3–07 victory over Fr. O'Neill's in the final at Páirc Uí Chaoimh, before later winning a Munster medal following a 6–07 to 2–08 defeat of Ballinahinch. On 11 May 2003, Coleman scored a point from a free in Ballinhassig's 4–15 to 1-06 All-Ireland final defeat of Blacks and Whites.

On 1 October 2005, Coleman won a Cork Premier Intermediate Championship medal after a 1–16 to 1–11 defeat of Aghada in the final. He later won a Munster medal before lining out in the All-Ireland final on 12 February 2006. Coleman ended the game as a runner-up as Ballinhassig were defeated by Dicksboro.

Coleman won a second Cork Premier Intermediate Championship medal on 7 October 2012 after a 1–19 to 1–15 defeat of Bandon in the final.

=== Inter-county ===
==== Minor and under-21 ====
Coleman joined the Cork minor hurling team in 2001, making his first appearance in a 1–15 to 0-07 Munster Championship quarter-final defeat of Waterford. In spite of losing out to Tipperary in the subsequent Munster final, Coleman later won an All-Ireland medal following Cork's 2–10 to 1–08 defeat of Galway in the final.

Coleman subsequently enjoyed three seasons as first-choice goalkeeper with the Cork under-21 hurling team.

==== Intermediate ====
Coleman was selected for the Cork intermediate hurling team during the team's unsuccessful championship campaign in 2002. He was included on the team once again in 2003 and won a Munster medal after a 2–12 to 0–11 defeat of Waterford. On 30 August 2003, Coleman won an All-Ireland medal as Kilkenny were defeated by 1–21 to 0–23 in the final.

In 2013, Coleman returned to the Cork intermediate team as captain.

==== Senior ====
On 7 January 2003, Coleman made his first appearance for the Cork senior hurling team as goalkeeper in a 4–12 to 1–07 defeat of Blackrock in a challenge match at Páirc Uí Rinn. He was later added to the Cork panel for the subsequent National League and Munster Championship campaigns. On 29 June 2003, Coleman won his first Munster medal as a non-playing substitute following Cork's 3–16 to 3–12 defeat of Waterford.

Coleman made his first competitive appearance for Cork on 28 March 2004 in a 2–17 to 1-20 National League game against Tipperary. He returned to the substitutes' bench for the subsequent championship. On 12 September 2004, Coleman won his first All-Ireland medal as a non-playing substitute following a 0–17 to 0–09 defeat of Kilkenny in the final.

After making just one appearance during the 2006 league, Coleman was confined to the position of second-choice goalkeeper for the subsequent championship. In spite of this he won his second Munster medal after a 1–21 to 1–16 defeat of Tipperary in the final. On 11 September 2005, Coleman won a second successive All-Ireland medal as a non-playing substitute after Cork defeated Galway in the final. He ended the season by being named as first-choice goalkeeper on Cork's Oireachtas Cup-winning team on 31 October 2005.

On 19 July 2008, Coleman made his championship debut for Cork when he came on as a substitute for the red-carded Donal Óg Cusack in an All-Ireland qualifier against Galway.

In spite of Coleman being overlooked in favour of Anthony Nash as a late substitute for Donal Óg Cusack in the National League semi-final against Tipperary, he was named as first-choice goalkeeper for the subsequent final against Kilkenny. Coleman had a disappointing game in which he was caught out for an early goal, failed to rise the sliotar properly when taking a free, before making a couple of nervy saves in a 3–21 to 0–16 defeat. Nash became Cork's first-choice goalkeeper for the subsequent championship. Coleman left the panel at the end of the season.

== Career statistics ==
=== Club ===
As of match played 22 March 2018.

Team	Year	Championship	
Team	Year	Apps	Score
Carrigdhoun	2002	1	0-00
Cork Institute of Technology	2003	2	0-01
Cork Institute of Technology	2004	3	0-00
Cork Institute of Technology	2005	2	1-00
Ballinhassig	2006	3	2-02
Ballinhassig	2007	3	0-03
Ballinhassig	2008	4	0-13
Ballinhassig	2009	4	1-02
Ballinhassig	2010	2	0-03
Ballinhassig	2011	6	1-04
Carrigdhoun	2012	—	
Ballinhassig	2013	4	1-03
Carrigdhoun	2014	3	0-00
Carrigdhoun	2015	1	0-00
Carrigdhoun	2016	2	0-00
Carrigdhoun	2017	—	
Carrigdhoun	2018	1	0-00
Total		41	6-31

=== Inter-county ===
Team	Year	National League			Munster		All-Ireland		Total	
Team	Year	Division	Apps	Score	Apps	Score	Apps	Score	Apps	Score
Cork	2003	Division 1B	0	0-00	0	0-00	0	0-00	0	0-00
Cork	2004	Division 1B	1	0-00	0	0-00	0	0-00	1	0-00
Cork	2005	Division 1B	1	0-00	0	0-00	0	0-00	1	0-00
Cork	2006	Division 1A	0	0-00	0	0-00	0	0-00	0	0-00
Cork	2007	Division 1A	0	0-00	0	0-00	0	0-00	0	0-00
Cork	2008	Division 1A	1	0-00	0	0-00	1	0-00	2	0-00
Cork	2009	Division 1	0	0-00	0	0-00	0	0-00	0	0-00
Cork	2010	Division 1	2	0-00	0	0-00	0	0-00	2	0-00
Cork	2011	Division 1	1	0-00	0	0-00	0	0-00	1	0-00
Cork	2012	Division 1A	1	0-00	0	0-00	0	0-00	1	0-00
Total			7	0-00	0	0-00	1	0-00	8	0-00

== Honours ==
Ballinhassig

- Munster Intermediate Club Hurling Championship (1): 2005
- Cork Premier Intermediate Hurling Championship (2): 2005, 2012
- All-Ireland Junior Club Hurling Championship (1): 2003
- Munster Junior Club Hurling Championship (1): 2002
- Cork Junior Hurling Championship (1): 2002
- South East Junior A Hurling Championship (2): 2000, 2002
- South East Minor A Hurling Championship (3): 1998, 1999, 2000

Cork

- All-Ireland Senior Hurling Championship (2): 2004, 2005
- Munster Senior Hurling Championship (3): 2003, 2005, 2006
- Oireachtas Cup (1): 2005
- All-Ireland Intermediate Hurling Championship (1): 2003
- Munster Intermediate Hurling Championship (1): 2003
- All-Ireland Minor Hurling Championship (1): 2001

Sporting positions
Preceded by Ross Cashman	Cork Intermediate Hurling Captain; 2013	Succeeded by David Drake
