= Niall McCarthy =

Irish hurler

Personal information
- Nickname: Niall Mac
- Born: 1 September 1981 (age 45) Carrigtwohill, County Cork
- Occupation: Teacher
- Height: 5.77 ft 0 in (176 cm)

Sport
- Sport: Hurling
- Position: Forward
Club
Years	Club	Apps (scores)
2002-2016	Carrigtwohill	30 (5-89)
Club titles
- Cork titles: 3
Inter-county
Years	County	Apps (scores)
2002-2016	Cork	50 (2-66)
Inter-county titles
- Munster titles: 3
- All-Irelands: 2
- NHL: 0
- All Stars: 1

Niall McCarthy (born 1 September 1981 in Carrigtwohill, County Cork) is an Irish sportsperson. He played hurling with his local club Carrigtwohill and has been a member of the Cork senior inter-county team since 2002.

== Playing career ==
=== Club ===
McCarthy plays his club hurling and Gaelic football with his local club in Carrigtwohill. He first came to prominence on the club scene, as a member of the club's minor football team in 1998. That year Carrigtwohill reached the final of county minor championship. The Tadhg Mac Carthaigh's club provided the opposition on that occasion and went on to defeat McCarthy's side.

McCarthy later joined the Carrigtwohill under-21 teams. In 2001 he lined out in the final of the county under-21 championship with Glen Rovers providing the opposition. The Glen won the game by 2–9 to 2–6.

In 2002 McCarthy was a key member of the Carrigtwohill senior team. That year the club reached the final of the county intermediate championship. McCarthy's side lined out against Delaney's on that occasion and, after an exciting hour of hurling, the game ended in a draw. A week later both sides met in the replay, however, McCarthy's side narrowly lost out by 1–13 to 0–14.

It was 2006 before Carrigtwohill reached the decider of the premier intermediate championship again. McCarthy was one of the key men in the forward line as Bishopstown provided the opposition. Disappointment and defeat were McCarthy's lot as 'the town' easily won the game by 0–20 to 1–11.

A year later McCarthy's club had as chance of redemption when they reached the intermediate final for the second consecutive year. Watergrasshill were the opponents in that game and an exciting and tense hour of hurling followed. At the full-time whistle Carrigtwohill were the winners by 3–14 to 3-12 and McCarthy finally collected a premier intermediate winners' medal.

In 2011 Carrigtwohill made it to the Cork Senior Hurling Championship for the first time since 1935 where they faced a star-studded Cork Institute of Technology team. Despite entering the game as underdogs McCarthy's team caused a huge shock and ran out 0–15 to 1–11 winners to take the title for the first time since 1918.

=== Minor, under-21, and intermediate ===
McCarthy first came to prominence on the inter-county scene as a member of the Cork minor hurling team when he was just sixteen years-old in 1998. In his debut season he failed to make the starting fifteen, however, he came on as a substitute in the Munster final. Clare were the opponents on this occasion but they were no match for Cork. A 3–13 to 0–8 score line gave Cork the victory and gave McCarthy a Munster winners' medal. The subsequent All-Ireland final saw Cork take on Kilkenny. McCarthy came on as a substitute once again as 'The Rebels' beat their rivals. A 2–15 to 1–9 score line gave Cork the win and gave McCarthy an All-Ireland minor winners' medal.

By 2001 McCarthy was a member of the Cork intermediate hurling team. That year he collected a Munster winners' medal in that competition as 'the Rebels' defeated Clare by 1–120 to 1–11. McCarthy's side later reached the All-Ireland decider and faced Wexford. Cork's hurlers defeated the Leinster champions by 2–17 to 2–8, giving McCarthy and All-Ireland winners' medal in this grade.

By this stage McCarthy had joined the Cork under-21 hurling team. After little success in 2001 and 2002, Cork reached the provincial decider. Tipperary were the opposition and, after an exciting game that featured extra-time, Cork were eventually defeated by 2–14 to 0–17.

=== Senior ===
McCarthy's performances in the other grades of hurling brought him to the attentions of the Cork senior selectors. He made his debut in the 2002 National Hurling League with Cork reaching the final of that competition. McCarthy lined out at wing-forward in that game against Kilkenny. A close match developed, however, 'the Cats' secured a narrow 2–15 to 2–14 victory. McCarthy later made his championship debut that year, however, Cork, showing little or no appetite for battle, were eliminated by Galway in the second round of the qualifiers that year.

While the Cork hurling team should have gone from strength to strength as a result of a solid foundation at minor and under-21 levels the opposite happened. A series of embarrassing defeats saw the Cork hurling team reach rock bottom and call a players' strike just before Christmas in 2002. Had the strike failed it could have meant the end of his and his teammates' careers, however, in the end the county board relented and met the demands. Although still amateur sportsmen the Cork senior hurling team were treated as professional athletes.

In 2003 Cork's players were vindicated in taking a stand as the team reached the Munster final for the first time in three years. Waterford provided the opposition on that occasion as one of hurling's modern rivalries began in earnest. An exciting game resulted between the two teams; however, victory went to Cork by 3–16 to 3–12. It was McCarthy's first Munster winners' medal in the senior grade and it gave a signal that Cork were back. Cork were hot favourites going into the subsequent All-Ireland semi-final against Wexford, however, it was far from a walkover. In one of the most exciting games of the championship both sides finished level: Cork 2-20, Wexford 3–17. Both sides met again six days later with Cork making no mistake and taking the spoils on a score line of 3–17 to 2–7. This win set up an All-Ireland final meeting with Kilkenny. In another thrilling game of hurling both teams were level for much of the game, exchanging tit-for-tat scores. A Setanta Ó hAilpín goal steadied the Cork ship, however, a Martin Comerford goal five minutes from the end settled the game as Kilkenny went on to win by 1–14 to 1–11.

2004 saw Cork reach the Munster final once again and, for the second consecutive year, Waterford provided the opposition. In what many consider to be the greatest provincial decider of them all, both sides fought tooth-and-nail for the full seventy minutes. Unfortunately for McCarthy Cork lost the game by just a single point on a score line of Waterford 3–16, Cork 1-21. Although Cork surrendered their provincial crown they were still in with a chance of landing the All-Ireland title. After maneuvering through the qualifiers Cork reached a second consecutive All-Ireland final and, once again, Kilkenny provided the opposition. This game took on a life of its own for a number of reasons. Chief among these was that Kilkenny were attempting to capture a third All-Ireland in-a-row and go one ahead of Cork in the All-Ireland roll of honour. The game was expected to be another classic; however, a damp day put an end to this. The first half was a low-scoring affair and provided little excitement for fans. The second-half saw Cork completely take over. For the last twenty-three minutes Cork scored nine unanswered points and went on to win the game by 0–17 to 0–9. McCarthy was named man of the match while he also collected his first All-Ireland winners' medal. He finished off the year by collecting an All-Star award.

In 2005 Cork were on form again. They won back the provincial crown that year with a 1–12 to 1–16 victory over Tipperary. It was McCarthy's second Munster winners’ medal as Cork went on the march for glory once again. In the All-Ireland semi-final against Clare their championship campaign was nearly derailed when they fell behind by seven points at the start of the second-half. A huge performance by Cork turned this deficit around and Cork went on to win the game by 0–16 to 0–15. While it was expected that Cork and Kilkenny would do battle again in a third consecutive All-Ireland final Galway were the surprise winners of the second semi-final. It was the first meeting of Cork and Galway in an All-Ireland final since 1990 and even more daunting was that men from the west had never beaten Cork in a championship decider. Once again neither side broke away into a considerable lead, however, at the final whistle Cork were ahead by 1–21 to 1–16. For the second year in-a-row Cork were the All-Ireland champions and McCartrhy collected his second winners’ medal.

2006 saw Cork turn their attentions to a first three-in-a-row of All-Ireland titles since 1978. The team's championship campaign got off to a good start with a 0–20 to 0–14 defeat of Clare in the opening round of the Munster championship. The subsequent provincial decider saw Cork take on Tipp for the second consecutive year. Star forward Joe Deane was to the fore, scoring an impressive eight points and contributing greatly to Cork's 2–11 to 1–11 victory over their old rivals and a third Munster medal for McCarthy. Subsequent victories over Limerick and Waterford saw Cork qualify for their fourth consecutive All-Ireland final and for the third time Kilkenny were the opponents. Like previous encounters neither side took a considerable lead, however, Kilkenny had a vital goal from Aidan Fogarty. Cork were in arrears coming into the final few minutes, however, Ben O'Connor goaled for Cork. It was too little too late as ‘the Cats’ denied ‘the Rebels’ the three-in-a-row on a score line of 1–16 to 1–13.

Following the defeat by Kilkenny in 2008 manager Gerald McCarthy's two-year contract came to an end. He was later re-appointed for a further two-year term by the Cork County Board, in spite of the majority of the players not wanting him to stay on. The players on the 2008 panel refused to play or train under McCarthy. (see 2008-2009 Cork players strike). McCarthy accordingly began the 2009 National League campaign with a new squad, none of whom had been able to make the previous year's panel. After months of pressure McCarthy eventually stepped down as manager.

Following the resolution to these difficulties Cork were defeated by Tipperary on a score line of 1–19 to 0–19 in the opening round of the Munster campaign. After a convincing win over Offaly, Cork's next game was a win-or-bust All-Ireland qualifier meeting with Galway. Cork faltered in the final ten minutes with McCarthy missing a golden goal opportunity that could have turned the game. In the end 'the Tribesmen' knocked 'the Rebels' out of the championship by 1–19 to 0–15.

=== Retirement from hurling ===
McCarthy retired from hurling in September 2016 due to a series of injuries and took up boxing. In 2017, he won the Junior Cruiserweight title while representing University College Cork.

Following his retirement, McCarthy expressed an interest in coaching, and, as of 2024, he was teaching physical education, health education, and history in a post-primary school in his hometown.

== Career statistics ==
=== Club ===
Team	Year	Cork PIHC	
Team	Year	Apps	Score
Carrigtwohill	2004	4	0-11
Carrigtwohill	2005	2	0-02
Carrigtwohill	2006	6	0-34
Carrigtwohill	2007	4	0-33
Carrigtwohill	Total	16	0-80
Carrigtwohill	Year	Cork SHC	
Carrigtwohill	Year	Apps	Score
Carrigtwohill	2008	4	0-16
Carrigtwohill	2009	5	4-27
Carrigtwohill	2010	2	0-05
Carrigtwohill	2011	5	0-13
Carrigtwohill	2012	3	0-09
Carrigtwohill	2013	2	0-02
Carrigtwohill	2014	1	1-02
Carrigtwohill	2015	5	0-10
Carrigtwohill	2016	3	0-05
Carrigtwohill	Total	30	5-89

== Honours ==
Carrigtwohill

- Cork Senior Hurling Championship (1): 2011
- Cork Premier Intermediate Hurling Championship (1): 2007
- Cork Minor Hurling Championship (1): 1998

Cork

- All-Ireland Senior Hurling Championship (2): 2004, 2005
- Munster Senior Hurling Championship (2): 2003, 2005, 2006
