= Cork Premier Intermediate Hurling Championship =

- Current season or competition: 2026 Cork Premier Intermediate Hurling Championship
- Code: Hurling
- Founded: 2004; 22 years ago
- Region: Cork (GAA)
- Trophy: Séamus Long Cup
- No. of teams: 12
- Title holders: Ballincollig (1st title)
- Most titles: Ballinhassig (3 titles)
- Sponsors: Co-Op Superstores
- Official website: Official website

The Cork Premier Intermediate Hurling Championship (known for sponsorship reasons as the Co-Op Superstores Cork Premier Intermediate Hurling Championship and abbreviated to the Cork PIHC) is an annual hurling competition organised by the Cork County Board of the Gaelic Athletic Association and contested by the top-ranking intermediate clubs in the county of Cork in Ireland. It is the third tier overall in the entire Cork hurling championship system.

The Cork Premier Intermediate Championship was introduced in 2004 following a split in the existing Cork Intermediate Hurling Championship. At the time of its creation it was the second tier of Cork hurling.

In its soon-to-be introduced format, the Cork Premier Intermediate Championship will begin in April. The 12 participating club teams will be drawn into three groups of four teams and play each other in a round-robin system. The three group winners and the three runners-up proceed to the knockout phase that culminates with the final match at Páirc Uí Rinn in October. The winner of the Cork Premier Intermediate Championship, as well as being presented with the Séamus Long Cup, qualifies for the subsequent Munster Club Championship.

The competition has been won by 18 teams. Ballinhassig is the most successful team in the tournament's history, having won it three times. Ballincollig are the title-holders, beating Dungourney by 1-19 to 0-16 in the 2026 final.

== History ==
The Cork Intermediate Championship was founded in 1909 in an effort to bridge the standard of play between the Cork Senior Championship and the Cork Junior Championship. For almost a century, the Cork Intermediate Championship was effectively the second tier championship in the Cork hurling championship system.

In 2003 the Cork County Board Executive established a Hurling Championship Review Committee in an effort to improve the competitiveness of the Cork Senior Championship. The committee also proposed the splitting of the existing Cork Intermediate Championship in two with the creation of a 16-team Cork Premier Intermediate Championship which became the second tier of the Cork hurling championship system.

The championship was first played in 2004 with the winner, St. Catherine's, gaining automatic promotion to the following year's Cork Senior Championship. Their place in the championship was taken by Watergrasshill who won the Cork Intermediate Championship. The idea of relegation was introduced in 2006 with St. Finbarr's becoming the first team to be relegated from the championship after losing a play-off to Ballincollig. Similarly, Delaney Rovers became the first team to be relegated to the championship after losing their senior status following a play-off defeat by Castlelyons. Relegation was suspended in 2013 and again from 2015 to 2019.

== Format ==
=== History ===
16 clubs entered the inaugural championship in 2004 and a double elimination format was used. Each team was guaranteed at least two games before being eliminated from the championship. In 2006 a relegation section was introduced. The four teams who lost both their games in Round 1 and Round 2 entered the relegation play-offs with the eventual losing team being relegated. An extra round of games was added to the championship in 2010. Each team was now given the opportunity of losing both of their games in Round 1 and Round 2 but remaining in the championship. This format remained in place until 2016 when it was decided to revert to the previous format.

=== Current ===
==== Development ====
On 2 April 2019, a majority of 136 club delegates voted to restructure the championship once again. The new format also led to a reduction in the number of participating clubs from 16 to 12.

==== Overview ====
Group stage: The 12 club teams are divided into three groups of four. Over the course of the group stage, which features one game in April and two games in August, each team plays once against the others in the group, resulting in each team being guaranteed at least three games. Two points are awarded for a win, one for a draw and zero for a loss. The teams are ranked in the group stage table by points gained, then scoring difference and then their head-to-head record. The top two teams in each group qualify for the knockout stage, with the two best-placed teams receiving byes to the semi-finals.

Quarter-finals: Two lone quarter-finals feature the four lowest-placed team from the group stage. Two teams qualify for the next round.

Semi-finals: The two semi-finals feature four teams. Two teams qualify for the next round.

Final: The two semi-final winners contest the final. The winning team are declared champions and gain automatic promotion to the following year's Cork Senior A Championship.

== Teams ==
=== 2027 Teams ===
The 12 teams due to compete in the 2027 Cork Premier Intermediate Hurling Championship are:

Team	Location	Division	Colours	Position in 2026	In Championship since	Championship Titles	Last Championship Title
Aghabullogue	Coachford	Muskerry	Green and white	Quarter-finals	2026	0	—
Ballymartle	Riverstick	Carrigdhoun	Green and gold	Group stage	2023	1	2010
Bandon	Bandon	Carbery	Yellow and white	Intermediate A champions	2027	1	2016
Carrigaline	Carrigaline	Carrigdhoun	Blue and yellow	Semi-finals	2009	0	—
Castlemartyr	Castlemartyr	Imokilly	Red and white	Group stage	2022	0	—
Cloyne	Cloyne	Imokilly	Red and black	Quarter-finals	2025	0	—
Dungourney	Dungourney	Imokilly	Yellow and green	Runners-up	2023	0	—
Éire Óg	Ovens	Muskerry	Red and yellow	Group stage	2021	0	—
Fermoy	Fermoy	Avondhu	Black and amber	Senior A relegated	2027	0	—
Kilworth	Kilworth	Avondhu	Red and white	Group stage	2021	0	—
Lisgoold	Lisgoold	Imokilly	Blue and gold	Relegation playoff winners	2025	0	—
Valley Rovers	Innishannon	Carrigdhoun	Green and white	Semi-finals	2010	0	—

== Sponsorship ==
Permanent TSB became the first title sponsor of the championship, serving in that capacity for just one year until 2005 when the Evening Echo signed a sponsorship deal. In 2020, Dairygold Co-Op Superstores were unveiled as the new title sponsor of the Cork Premier Intermediate Championship.

== Venues ==
=== Early rounds ===
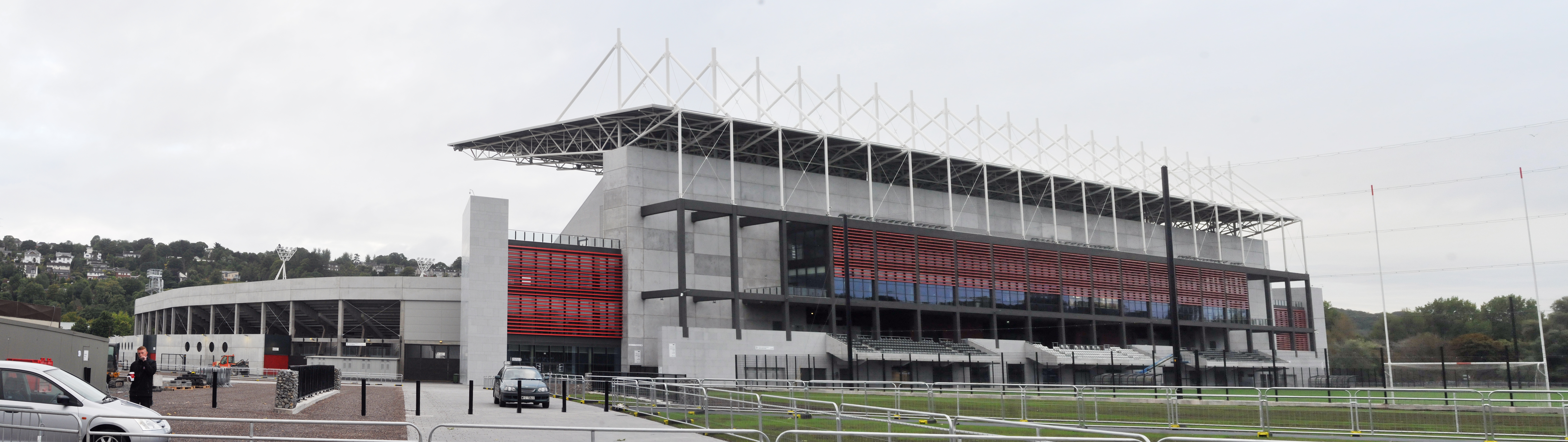
The rebuilt Páirc Uí Chaoimh hosted the 2018 final between Charleville and Courcey Rovers.

Fixtures in the opening rounds of the championship are usually played at a neutral venue that is deemed halfway between the participating teams. Some of the more common venues include Clonmult Memorial Park, Páirc Shéamuis de Barra, St. Catherine's Park, Church Road and Páirc Liam Mhic Cárthaigh.

=== Final ===
The final has always been played at one of Cork GAA's two main stadiums. On several occasions the final has been played at Páirc Uí Chaoimh as the curtain raiser to the senior final. The rebuilding and subsequent improvement works to Páirc Uí Chaoimh resulted in several finals being held at Páirc Uí Rinn.

== Managers ==
Managers in the Cork Championship are involved in the day-to-day running of the team, including the training, team selection, and sourcing of players. Their influence varies from club-to-club and is related to the individual club committees. The manager is assisted by a team of two or three selectors and a backroom team consisting of various coaches.

Recent winning managers
Manager(s)	Team	Wins	Winning years
Dermot O'Riordan	Carrigtwohill	1	2007
Tadhg Hurley	Blarney	1	2008
Finbar Bermingham	Douglas	1	2009
Anthony McCarthy	Ballymartle	1	2010
Diarmuid Corcoran	Courcey Rovers	1	2011
Johnny Crowley	Ballinhassig	1	2012
Christy Cooney	Youghal	1	2013
Jimmy Quilty	Ballyhea	1	2014
Eugene Desmond	Newcestown	1	2015
Niall O'Halloran	Bandon	1	2016
Donagh Duane	Kanturk	1	2017
John Moloney	Charleville	1	2018
Dave Colbert; James O'Connor	Fr. O'Neill's	1	2019
Paul O'Leary	Blarney	1	2020
Seán Guiheen	Courcey Rovers	1	2021
Paul McCarthy	Inniscarra	1	2022
Noel Furlong	Castlelyons	1	2023
Eddie Enright	Watergrasshill	1	2024
John Paul Griffin	Ballinhassig	1	2025

== Trophy ==
The winning team is presented with the Séamus Long Cup. A national school teacher by profession, Séamus Long (1884-1953) was elected secretary of the Ballincollig club in 1914, before serving as the first secretary of the Muskerry Board in 1924. A founder-member of the Ballinora club the same year, he was the club's first chairman. Long also served as vice-chairman of the Cork County Board and was a Munster Council delegate from 1949 until his death in 1953.

== List of Finals ==
=== Legend ===
- Gold – Munster intermediate club champions
- Silver – Munster intermediate club runners-up

=== List of Cork PIHC finals ===
Year	Winners		Runners-up		Venue	#
Year	Club	Score	Club	Score	Venue	#
2026	Ballincollig	1-19	Dungourney	0-16	SuperValu Páirc Uí Chaoimh	
2025	Ballinhassig	2-22	Ballincollig	1-19	SuperValu Páirc Uí Chaoimh	
2024	Watergrasshill	2-16	Carrigaline	0-19	SuperValu Páirc Uí Chaoimh	
2023	Castlelyons	0-19	Kilworth	0-17	Páirc Uí Chaoimh	
2022	Inniscarra	3-12	Castlemartyr	1-17	Páirc Uí Chaoimh	
2021	Courcey Rovers	1-19	Castlelyons	1-18	Páirc Uí Chaoimh	
2020	Blarney	1-20	Castlelyons	0-15	Páirc Uí Chaoimh	
2019	Fr O'Neills	3-23	Kilworth	1-20	Páirc Uí Rinn	
2018	Charleville	1-09, 0-15	Courcey Rovers	0-12, 0-14	Páirc Uí Rinn	
2017	Kanturk	0-17	Mallow	1-12	Páirc Uí Rinn	
2016	Bandon	1-20	Fermoy	1-14	Páirc Uí Rinn	
2015	Newcestown	1-23	Valley Rovers	0-08	Páirc Uí Rinn	
2014	Ballyhea	1-17	Newcestown	0-16	Páirc Uí Chaoimh	
2013	Youghal	0-11	Castlelyons	0-10	Páirc Uí Rinn	
2012	Ballinhassig	1-19	Bandon	1-12	Páirc Uí Chaoimh	
2011	Courcey Rovers	0-15	Youghal	1-09	Páirc Uí Rinn	
2010	Ballymartle	2-14	Tracton	0-13	Páirc Uí Chaoimh	
2009	Douglas	0-20	Ballymartle	0-16	Páirc Uí Chaoimh	
2008	Blarney	0-13	Courcey Rovers	1-09	Páirc Uí Chaoimh	
2007	Carrigtwohill	3-14	Watergrasshill	3-12	Páirc Uí Chaoimh	
2006	Bishopstown	0-20	Carrigtwohill	1-11	Páirc Uí Chaoimh	
2005	Ballinhassig	1-16	Aghada	1-11	Páirc Uí Rinn	
2004	St. Catherine's	1-11	Courcey Rovers	1-08	Páirc Uí Chaoimh	

== Roll of honour ==
=== By club ===
#	Club	Titles	Runners-up	Championships won	Championships runner-up
1	Ballinhassig	3	0	2005, 2012, 2025	—
2	Courcey Rovers	2	3	2011, 2021	2004, 2008, 2018
2	Blarney	2	0	2008, 2020	—
4	Castlelyons	1	3	2023	2013, 2020, 2021
4	Carrigtwohill	1	1	2007	2006
4	Ballymartle	1	1	2010	2009
4	Youghal	1	1	2013	2011
4	Newcestown	1	1	2015	2014
4	Bandon	1	1	2016	2012
4	Watergrasshill	1	1	2024	2007
4	Ballincollig	1	1	2026	2025
4	St. Catherine's	1	0	2004	—
4	Bishopstown	1	0	2006	—
4	Douglas	1	0	2009	—
4	Ballyhea	1	0	2014	—
4	Kanturk	1	0	2017	—
4	Charleville	1	0	2018	—
4	Fr O'Neills	1	0	2019	—
4	Inniscarra	1	0	2022	—
20	Kilworth	0	2	—	2019, 2023
20	Aghada	0	1	—	2005
20	Tracton	0	1	—	2010
20	Valley Rovers	0	1	—	2015
20	Fermoy	0	1	—	2016
20	Mallow	0	1	—	2017
20	Castlemartyr	0	1	—	2022
20	Carrigaline	0	1	—	2024
20	Dungourney	0	1	—	2026

=== By Division ===
Division	Titles	Runners-Up	Total	Most recent win
Imokilly	6	9	15	2024
Carrigdhoun	6	7	13	2025
Muskerry	4	1	5	2026
Avondhu	2	4	6	2018
Carbery	2	2	4	2016
Seandún	2	0	2	2009
Duhallow	1	0	1	2017

== Records and statistics ==
=== Teams ===
The following is a list of teams who have played in the Cork Premier Intermediate Hurling Championship since its formation in 2004 to the current championships season. As of the 2020 season, 31 teams have played in the Cork Premier Intermediate Hurling Championship.

All statistics here refer to time in the Cork Premier Intermediate Hurling Championship only, with the exception of 'Most Recent Finish' (which refers to all levels of play). Cork Premier Intermediate Hurling Championship teams playing in the 2020 championship season are indicated in bold. A 'spell' refers to a number of consecutive seasons within the championship, uninterrupted by relegation. If the longest spell is the current spell, this is shown in bold.

Club	Location	Total seasons	Total spells	Longest spell	Most recent promotion	Most recent relegation	Total seasons absent	Seasons	Most recent finish	Best finish	Top scorer
Aghabullogue	Coachford	9	1	9	Never promoted	2012	0	2004-2012	Semi-finalists; Cork IHC	Quarter-finalists	Pa Finnegan (8-96)
**Aghada**	Aghada	8	2	5	2017	2008	8	2004–2008; **2018–**	Group stage	Runners-up	Trevor O'Keeffe (2-116)
Argideen Rangers	Timoleague	6	1	6	Never promoted	2011	0	2006-2011	Quarter-finalists; Cork IHC	Quarter-finalists	
**Ballincollig**	Ballincollig	12	2	10	Never promoted	2013	0	2004-2013; **2019–**	Quarter-finalists	Semi-finalists	
**Ballinhassig**	Ballinhassig	10	3	**7**	2012	Never relegated	7	2004–2005; 2012; **2014–**	Group stage	Champions	
Ballyhea	Ballyhea	11	1	11	2014	Never relegated	0	2004-2014	Quarter-finalists; Cork SHC	Champions	Neil Ronan (9-144)
Ballymartle	Riverstick	4	1	4	2010	Never relegated	0	2007-2010	Round 2 Cork SHC	Champions	
Bandon	Bandon	5	1	5	2016	Never relegated	0	2012-2016	Round 3 Cork SHC	Champions	Ronan Crowley (8-116)
Bishopstown	Bishopstown	3	1	3	2006	Never relegated	0	2004-2006	Quarter-finalists; Cork SHC	Champions	Pa Cronin (3-62)
Blackrock	Blackrock	1	1	**1**	Never promoted	2020	0	2020	Relegated	Relegated	
Blarney	Blarney	15	2	**10**	2020	Never relegated	2	2004–2008; 2011–2020	Champions	Champions	Mark Cremin (0-90)
**Carrigaline**	Carrigaline	12	1	**12**	Never promoted	Never relegated	0	**2009–**	Semi-finalists	Quarter-finalists	Rob O'Shea (14-153)
Carrigtwohill	Carrigtwohill	4	1	4	2007	Never relegated	0	2004-2007	Semi-finalists; Cork SHC	Champions	Niall McCarthy (0-80)
**Castlelyons**	Castlelyons	11	1	**11**	Never promoted	Never relegated	0	**2010–**	Runners-up	Runners-up	
Charleville	Charleville	3	1	3	2018	Never relegated	0	2016-2018	Round 3 Cork SHC	Champions	Darragh Fitzgibbon (3-66)
Cloyne	Cloyne	7	1	7	Never promoted	Never relegated	0	2013-2019	Round 2	Semi-finalists	Diarmuid O'Sullivan (17-94)
**Courcey Rovers**	Ballinspittle	14	2	8	2011	Never relegated	3	2004–2011; **2015–**	Semi-finalists	Champions	Daire Lordan (0-104)
Delanys	Dublin Hill	1	1	1	Never promoted	2007	0	2007	Knockout stage City JAHC	Relegation final	Paul Finnegan (0-13)
Douglas	Douglas	2	1	2	2009	Never relegated	0	2008-2009	Round 3 Cork SHC	Champions	Mark Harrington (6-16)
Fermoy	Fermoy	5	1	5	Never promoted	Never relegated	0	2015-2019	Round 3	Runners-up	Liam Coleman (6-128)
Fr. O'Neill's	Ballymacoda	6	2	3	2019	2010	6	2008-2010; 2017-2019	Champions	Champions	Declan Dalton (9-78)
**Inniscarra**	Inniscarra	17	1	**17**	Never promoted	Never relegated	0	**2004–**	Group stage	Semi-finalists	
Kanturk	Kanturk	4	1	4	2017	Never relegated	0	2014-2017	Round 3 Cork SHC	Champions	
Kilbrittain	Kilbrittain	4	1	4	Never promoted	2014	0	2011-2014	Relegation play-off Cork IHC	Semi-finalists	
Kilworth	Kilworth	7	1	7	Never promoted	Never relegated	0	2013-2019	Runners-up	Runners-up	Noel McNamara (15-136)
Mallow	Mallow	16	1	16	Never promoted	Never relegated	0	2004-2019	Round 3	Runners-up	Seán Hayes (13-141)
Newcestown	Newcestown	12	1	12	2015	Never relegated	0	2004-2015	Round 2 Cork SHC	Champions	Eoin Kelly (9-142)
St. Catherine's	Ballynoe	1	2	1	2004	2009	0	2004; 2009	Round 4 Cork IHC	Champions	Michael Hegarty (1-34)
St. Finbarr's	Togher	3	1	3	Never promoted	2006	0	2004-2006	Round 3 Cork IHC	Round 3	
Tracton	Tracton	14	1	14	Never promoted	2017	0	2004-2017	Round 4 Cork IHC	Runners-up	Ronan Walsh (12-336)
**Valley Rovers**	Innishannon	11	1	**11**	Never promoted	Never relegated	0	**2010–**	Relegation playoff	Runners-up	Chris O'Leary (9-153)
**Youghal**	Youghal	13	2	10	Never promoted	Never relegated	4	2004-2013; **2018–**	Group stage	Champions	Leigh Desmond (12-141)
**Watergrasshill**	Watergrasshill	20	1	**20**	2024	Never relegated	0	**2005–2024**	Champions	Champions	

=== Final ===
==== Team ====
- Most wins: 3:
  - Ballinhassig (2005, 2012, 2025)
- Most appearances in a final: 3:
  - Courcey Rovers (2004, 2008, 2018)
  - Ballinhassig (2005, 2012, 2025)
- Biggest win: 18 points
  - Newcestown 1-23 - 0-08 Valley Rovers, (2015)
- Most goals in a final: 6
  - Carrigtwohill 3-14 - 3-12 Watergrasshill, (2007)
- Most points in a final: 43
  - Fr O'Neill's 3-23 - 1-20 Kilworth, (2019)
- Most goals by a winning side: 3
  - Carrigtwohill 3-14 - 3-12 Watergrasshill, (2007)
- Most goals by a losing side: 3
  - Watergrasshill 3-12 - 3-14 Carrigtwohill, (2007)
- Most points by a winning side: 23
  - Newcestown 1-23 - 0-08 Valley Rovers, (2015)
- Most points by a losing side: 16
  - Ballymartle 0-16 - 0-20 Douglas, (2009)
  - Newcestown 0-16 - 1-17 Ballyhea, (2014)
- Highest cumulative score overall: 44
  - Carrigtwohill 3-14 - 3-12 Watergrasshill, (2007)
- Highest cumulative score by a winning team: 26
  - Newcestown 1-23 - 0-08 Valley Rovers, (2015)
- Highest cumulative score by a losing team: 21
  - Watergrasshill 3-12 - 3-14 Carrigtwohill, (2007)
- Most defeats: 2
  - Courcey Rovers (2004, 2008, 2018)

=== Top scorers ===
==== All time ====
As of match played 12 October 2019.

Rank	Name	Team	Goals	Points	Total
1	Ronan Walsh	Tracton	12	336	372
2	**Rob O'Shea**	Carrigaline	14	153	195
3	**Noel McNamara**	Kilworth	15	136	181
4	**Seán Hayes**	Mallow	13	141	180
5	Leigh Desmond	Youghal	12	141	177

==== By season ====
===== Overall =====
Year	Top scorer	Team	Score	Total
2004	Pa Dineen	Mallow	3-25	34
2005	Trevor O'Keeffe	Aghada	1-45	48
2006	Pa Cronin	Bishopstown	3-36	45
2007	Ronan Walsh	Tracton	5-30	45
2008	Ger O'Leary	Fr. O'Neill's	2-38	44
2009	Daniel Twomey	Newcestown	3-20	36
2010	Ronan Walsh	Tracton	2-57	63
2011	Éamonn Collins	Valley Rovers	6-33	51
2012	Ronan Crowley	Bandon	4-33	45
2013	Ronan Walsh	Tracton	2-46	52
2014	Adrian Mannix	Kilworth	0-43	43
2015	Seán Hayes	Mallow	4-36	48
2016	Liam Coleman	Fermoy	3-51	60
2017	Chris O'Leary	Valley Rovers	3-32	41
2018	Tadhg O'Sullivan	Courcey Rovers	1-49	52
2019	Declan Dalton	Fr. O'Neill's	3-45	54
2020	Mark Coleman	Blarney	1-50	53
2021	Richard Sweetnam	Courcey Rovers	0-46	46
2022	Mike Kelly	Castlemartyr	**1-64**	**67**
2023	Alan Fenton	Castlelyons	0-49	49
2024	Brian Kelleher	Carrigaline	0-50	50
2025	Ger Collins	Ballinhassig	4-38	50

===== Single game =====
Year	Top scorer	Team	Score	Total
2004	Pa Dineen	Mallow	1-09	12
2005	Neil Ronan	Ballyhea	2-08	14
2006	Pa Cronin	Bishopstown	2-07	13
2007	Leigh Desmond	Youghal	1-09	12
2008	Ger O'Leary	Fr. O'Neill's	2-09	15
2009	Daniel Twomey	Newcestown	0-12	12
2009	Maurice O'Sullivan	Ballyhea	0-12	12
2010	Ronan Walsh	Tracton	0-13	13
2011	Aaron Sheehan	Mallow	1-10	16
2011	Rory O'Doherty	Ballincollig	1-10	16
2012	Ronan Crowley	Bandon	3-06	15
2013	Ronan Walsh	Tracton	2-10	16
2013	Adrian Mannix	Kilworth	1-13	16
2014	Adrian Mannix	Kilworth	0-13	13
2015	Seán Hayes	Mallow	**2-13**	**19**
2016	Noel McNamara	Kilworth	3-05	14
2017	Chris O'Leary	Valley Rovers	1-10	13
2018	Tadhg O'Sullivan	Courcey Rovers	1-09	12
2018	Shane O'Regan	Watergrasshill	0-12	12
2019	Brian Kelleher	Carrigaline	2-10	16
2019	Brian Kelleher	Carrigaline	2-10	16
2020	Eoin O'Farrell	Blackrock	1-12	15
2020	Chris O'Leary	Valley Rovers	0-15	15
2021	Will Leahy	Aghada	0-15	15
2022	Noel McNamara	Kilworth	1-10	13
2022	Mike Kelly	Castlemartyr	0-13	13
2023	Brian Kelleher	Carrigaline	3-08	17
2024	Matthew Bradley	Aghabullogue	1-14	17
2025	Stephen Wills	Ballincollig	0-16	16

==== In finals ====
===== Cumulative =====
Pos.	Player	Team	Score	Total
1	Ronan Crowley	Bandon	2-16	22
2	Tadhg O'Sullivan	Courcey Rovers	0-15	15
3	Daniel Twomey	Newcestown	1-11	14
3	Declan Dalton	Fr. O'Neill's	1-11	14
3	Mark Coleman	Blarney	0-14	14
4	Seánie O'Farrell	Carrigtwohill	3-02	11
4	Rory O'Dwyer	Ballymartle	0-11	11
4	Niall McCarthy	Carrigtwohill	0-11	11
4	Noel McNamara	Kilworth	0-11	11
5	Fintan O'Leary	Ballinhassig	2-04	10
5	Leigh Desmond	Youghal	1-07	10

===== Finals =====
Year	Top scorer	Team	Score	Total
2004	Michael Hegarty	Courcey Rovers	0-05	5
2005	Trevor O'Keeffe	Aghada	0-09	9
2006	Pa Cronin	Bishopstown	0-09	9
2007	Seánie O'Farrell	Carrigtwohill	3-01	10
2008	Cian Lordan	Courcey Rovers	1-03	6
2009	Rory O'Dwyer	Ballymartle	0-10	10
2010	Ronan Walsh	Tracton	0-07	7
2011	Leigh Desmond	Youghal	1-04	7
2012	Ronan Crowley	Bandon	1-06	9
2013	Colm Spillane	Castlelyons	0-07	7
2014	Daniel Twomey	Newcestown	0-06	6
2015	Daniel Twomey	Newcestown	1-05	8
2016	Ronan Crowley	Bandon	1-10	13
2017	Lorcán McLoughlin	Kanturk	0-08	8
2018	Tadhg O'Sullivan	Courcey Rovers	0-08	8
2019	Declan Dalton	Fr. O'Neill's	**1-11**	**14**
2020	Mark Coleman	Blarney	**0-14**	**14**

== See also ==
- Cork Intermediate A Hurling Championship
- List of Cork Premier Intermediate Hurling Championship winners
