= 2004 Cork Premier Intermediate Hurling Championship =

2004 Hurling competition

- Dates: 30 April 2004 – 31 October 2004
- Teams: 16
- Champions: St. Catherine's (1st title); Mike Fitzgerald (captain); Jerry Fitzgerald (manager)
- Runners-up: Courcey Rovers; Timmy Lordan (captain)

Tournament statistics
- Matches played: 26
- Goals scored: 55 (2.12 per match)
- Points scored: 560 (21.54 per match)
- Top scorer(s): Pa Dineen (3-25)

The 2004 Cork Premier Intermediate Hurling Championship was the inaugural staging of the Cork Premier Intermediate Hurling Championship since its establishment by the Cork County Board. The draw for the opening round fixtures took place on 10 February 2004. The championship began on 30 April 2004 and ended on 31 October 2004.

On 31 October 2004, St. Catherine's won the championship following a 1-11 to 1-8 defeat of Courcey Rovers in the final. This remains their only championship title in the grade.

Mallow's Pa Dineen was the championship's top scorer with 3-25.

== Results ==
=== Round 1 ===
| 30 April 2004 Round 1 | St. Catherine's | 1-13 - 1-11 | Carrigtwohill | Lisgoold |
| | M Hegarty 0-5, K Morrison 0-4, D Walsh 1-0, S Kearney 0-3, B Hogan 0-1. | | C Horgan 1-0, M Fitzgerald 0-3, D Healy 0-3, S O'Farrell 0-2, J Roche 0-1, S Dineen 0-1, N McCarthy 0-1. | Referee: C McAllister (Midleton) |

| 1 May 2004 Round 1 | Inniscarra | 1-09 - 1-05 | Bishopstown | Ovens |
| | D O'Connell 1-2, J O'Mahony 0-3, D O'Riordan 0-2, M O'Sullivan 0-1, J Olden 0-1. | | D Crowley 1-1, D O'Mahony 0-3, S O'Neill 0-1. |

| 1 May 2004 Round 1 | Mallow | 2-09 - 3-08 | Courcey Rovers | Blarney |
| | P Dineen 1-4, R O'Connell 1-2, M Maher 0-2, B Carey 0-1. | | J Murphy 2-1, N Murphy 0-5, S Hurley 1-0, V Hurley 0-2. |

| 1 May 2004 Round 1 | Youghal | 0-11 - 1-11 | Ballincollig | Páirc Séamus de Barra, Carrigtwohill |
| | O Coleman 0-7, D Ring 0-2, JP Joyce 0-2. | | A O'Donovan 1-4, D Beale 0-5, N Connaughton 0-1, J O'Brien 0-1. |

| 1 May 2004 Round 1 | Aghada | 2-07 - 2-14 | Tracton | Church Road, Blackrock |
| | V Morrissey 0-4, D Creedon 1-0, S O'Keeffe 1-0, P O'Neill 0-2, G Melvin 0-1. | | D Walsh 1-7, F Walsh 1-1, F Lynch 0-2, S O'Sullivan 0-2, N Collins 0-1, J Kingston 0-1. |

| 1 May 2004 Round 1 | Aghabullogue | 0-12 - 1-10 | Ballinhassig | Páirc Uí Chaoimh, Cork |
| | D Twomey 0-7, E Twomey 0-3, P Kelleher 0-1, F Foley 0-1. | | D Dineen 0-5, D Duggan 1-0, S Dineen 0-2, F O'Leary 0-2, M Coleman 0-1. |

| 7 May 2008 Round 1 | Ballyhea | 0-11 - 1-09 | Newcestown | Ballyanly |
| | M O'Sullivan 0-9, D Ronan 0-1, I Curtin 0-1. | | A O'Sullivan 0-6, P Condon 1-1, H Curran 0-2. | Referee: C McAllister (Midleton) |

| 9 May 2004 Round 1 | St. Finbarr's | 0-10 - 0-13 | Blarney | Ovens |
| | K Kelleher 0-5, V Cooney 0-3, E Pól O'Callaghan 0-1, T Olden 0-1. | | A Shanahan 0-5, R McNamara 0-2, J Hurley 0-2, C Sheehan 0-2, D O'Leary 0-1, J Hughes 0-1. | Referee: C Harrington (Carrigaline) |

=== Round 2 ===
| 16 May 2004 Round 2 | Aghada | 1-17 - 3-06 | Aghabullogue | Páirc Uí Rinn, Cork |
| | S O'Keeffe 0-6, R Dwane 1-1, G Melvin 0-3, V Morrissey 0-2, B Morrissey 0-2, P O'Neill 0-2, A Morrissey 0-1. | | D Twomey 1-2, P Kelleher 1-0, N Buckley 1-0, S Twomey 0-1, F Foley 0-1, D O'Leary 0-1, B Kiely 0-1. | Referee: M Myers (Whites Cross) |

| 16 May 2004 Round 2 | St. Finbarr's | 2-08 - 1-15 | Bishopstown | Páirc Uí Rinn, Cork |
| | K Kelleher 0-5, E Fitzpatrick 1-1, D O'Regan 1-1, V Cooney 0-1. | | D O'Mahony 0-7, D Crowley 1-2, C Doyle 0-3, S O'Neill 0-2, R Conway 0-1. | Referee: D O'Flynn (Fr. O'Neill's) |

| 16 May 2004 Round 2 | Mallow | 1-12 - 0-15 | Ballyhea | Fr. Con Buckley Park, Buttevant |
| | P Dineen 1-7, M Buckley 0-2, R O'Connell 0-1, B Carey 0-1, R Galvin 0-1. | | M O'Sullivan 0-5, I Ronan 0-3, D O'Riordan 0-2, D Ronan 0-2, A Crowley 0-1, J O'Sullivan 0-1. | Referee: R Murphy (Lyre) |

| 29 May 2004 Round 2 replay | Mallow | 2-11 - 1-12 | Ballyhea | Fr. Con Buckley Park, Buttevant |
| | P Dineen 1-9, T O'Riordan 1-0, J Desmond 0-1, M Buckley 0-1. | | D Ronan 1-5, T Shanahan 0-3, I Ronan 0-1, Jonathan O'Sullivan 0-1, M O'Sullivan 0-1, I Curtin 0-1. | Referee: R Murphy (Lyre) |

| 3 June 2004 Round 2 | Youghal | 1-07 - 1-12 | Carrigtwohill | Castlemartyr |
| | E Coleman 1-3, B Ring 0-2, C Ó Laochadha 0-1, A Murphy 0-1. | | N McCarthy 0-6, M Fitzgerald 1-1, S Farrell 0-2, N Kidney 0-1, J O'Connor 0-1, L Barry 0-1. | Referee: S Collins (Carrigaline) |

=== Round 3 ===
| 12 June 2004 Round 3 | Ballincollig | 2-09 - 1-11 | Newcestown | Cloughduv |
| | F Kelly 1-5, R O'Doherty 1-0, E O'Sullivan 0-1, R Ryan 0-1, J O'Brien 0-1, C Weste 0-1. | | G O'Driscoll 0-4, P Condon 1-0, A O'Sullivan 0-3, P Crowley 0-2, B O'Donovan 0-1, P Kenneally 0-1. | Referee: A Cummins (Ballymartle) |

| 18 June 2004 Round 3 | Ballinhassig | 2-13 - 1-11 | Tracton | Riverstick |
| | D Duggan 1-0, M Coleman 1-0, J O'Sullivan 0-3, D Dineen 0-3, F O'Leary 0-3, D Brennan 0-2, J Mullaney 0-2. | | F Walsh 0-4, H Sisk 1-0, F Lynch 0-2, N Collins 0-2, D Walsh 0-2, S O'Sullivan 0-1. | Referee: C McAllister (Midleton) |

| 3 July 2004 Round 3 | Courcey Rovers | 3-10 - 1-09 | Bishopstown | Ballinhassig |
| | J Murphy 1-1, S Hayes 1-1, M O'Donovan 1-1, N Murphy 0-4, D Twomey 0-1, V Hurley 0-1, D Hayes 0-1. | | C Doyle 1-0, P Cronin 0-3, B Cuthbert 0-2, J Murphy 0-1, B Healy 0-1, D O'Mahony 0-1, S O'Neill 0-1. | Referee: M Collins (Clonakilty) |

| 25 September 2004 Round 3 | Inniscarra | 1-12 - 2-11 | Carrigtwohill | Páirc Uí Rinn, Cork |
| | D O'Riordan 1-8, S Holland 0-1, C Holland 0-1, R Wall 0-1, D O'Connell 0-1. | | S O'Farrell 1-1, M Fitzgerald 0-4, S Cuddigan 1-0, N McCarthy 0-2, J Barrett 0-2, D Collins 0-1, L Barry 0-1. | Referee: J Kearney (Na Piarsaigh) |

=== Quarter-finals ===
| 18 July 2004 Quarter-final | Aghada | 1-09 - 1-09 | Blarney | Páirc Uí Chaoimh, Cork |
| | A Morrissey 1-1, P O'Neill 0-3, T O'Keeffe 0-2, V Morrissey 0-2, B Morrissey 0-1. | | S O'Donoghue 1-0, J Hughes 0-2, A Shanahan 0-2, R Byrne 0-1, C Sheehan 0-1, P Ahern 0-1, J Hurley 0-1, P Nodwell 0-1. | Referee: D Copps (Ballyhea) |

| 18 July 2004 Quarter-final | Courcey Rovers | 1-10 - 0-13 | Ballinhassig | Minane Bridge |
| | N Murphy 0-7, S Hayes 1-1, J Murphy 0-1, D Twoemy 0-1. | | D Dineen 0-7, D Duggan 0-2, S Dineen 0-1, J O'Sullivan 0-1, B Coleman 0-1. | Referee: D Kirwan (Éire Óg) |

| 18 July 2004 Quarter-final | St. Catherine's | 0-09 - 0-08 | Mallow | Páirc Uí Chaoimh, Cork |
| | R O'Connell 0-3, S Kearney 0-3, D Walsh 0-1, K Morrison 0-1, B Hogan 0-1. | | P Dineen 0-5, T Riordan 0-1, D Kerrisk 0-1, R O'Connell 0-1. | Referee: K Healy (Ballymartle) |

| 21 August 2004 Quarter-final replay | Blarney | 1-12 - 0-12 | Aghada | Páirc Uí Rinn, Cork |
| | A Shanahan 0-5, G O'Donovan 1-1, J Hurley 0-2, P Ahern 0-1, S O'Donoghue 0-1, B Sheehan 0-1, P Nodwell 0-1. | | G Melvin 0-3, V Morrissey 0-2, A Morrissey 0-2, S O'Keeffe 0-2, P O'Neill 0-1, P O'Neill 0-1, D Creedon 0-1. | Referee: D Copps (Ballyhea) |

| 29 August 2004 Quarter-final replay | Courcey Rovers | 1-15 - 2-08 | Ballinhassig | Minane Bridge |
| | M O'Donovan 1-4, N Murphy 0-5, J Murphy 0-2, S Twomey 0-1, S Hayes 0-1, V Hurley 0-1, L Twomey 0-1. | | D Dineen 0-4, B Coleman 1-0, S Dineen 1-0, M Coleman 0-2, J Mullaney 0-1, M Ahern 0-1. | Referee: D Kirwan (Éire Óg) |

| 3 October 2004 Quarter-final | Ballincollig | 0-14 - 1-08 | Carrigtwohill | Páirc Uí Rinn, Cork |
| | F Kelly 0-8, J Miskella 0-3, R O'Doherty 0-1, C Weste 0-1, A Beale 0-1. | | S O'Farrell 1-4, N McCarthy 0-2, N Barrett 0-1, M Fitzgerald 0-1. | Referee: D Copps (Ballyhea) |

=== Semi-finals ===
| 3 October 2004 Semi-final | St. Catherine's | 1-15 - 0-12 | Blarney | Páirc Uí Chaoimh, Cork |
| | M Hegarty 0-8, S Kearney 1-2, R O'Connell 0-1, D Walsh 0-1, C Casey 0-1, B Hogan 0-1, D Farrell 0-1. | | A Shanahan 0-3, G O'Donovan 0-2, J Hughes 0-2, P Ahern 0-1, D O'Leary 0-1, D McSweeeny 0-1, E McCarthy 0-1, J Hurley 0-1. | Referee: M Harrington (Carrigaline) |

| 16 October 2004 Semi-final | Courcey Rovers | 1-14 - 1-09 | Ballincollig | Páirc Uí Rinn, Cork |
| | N Murphy 0-9, S Hayes 1-1, S Twomey 0-2, D Twomey 0-1, M O'Donovan 0-1. | | D Beale 1-3, F Kelly 0-2, R Ryan 0-1, J Miskella 0-1, R O'Doherty 0-1, J O'Brien 0-1. | Referee: D Copps (Ballyhea) |

=== Final ===
| 31 October 2004 Final | St. Catherine's | 1-11 - 1-08 | Courcey Rovers | Páirc Uí Chaoimh, Cork |
| | M Hegarty 0-5, C Casey 1-0, K Morrison 0-2, R O'Connell 0-2, S Kearney 0-1, J Sheehan 0-1. | | S Hayes 1-1, N Murphy 0-3, J Murphy 0-3, L Twomey 0-1. | Referee: D Copps (Ballyhea) |

== Championship statistics ==
=== Scoring events ===
- Widest winning margin: 7 points
  - Tracton 2-14 - 2-07 Aghada (Round 1)
  - Courcey Rovers 3-10 - 1-09 Bishopstown (Round 3)
- Most goals in a match: 5
  - Courcey Rovers 3-08 - 2-09 Mallow (Round 1)
- Most points in a match: 27
  - Mallow 1-12 - 0-15 Ballyhea (Round 2)
  - St. Catherine's 1-15 - 0-12 Blarney (Semi-final)
- Most goals by one team in a match: 3
  - Courcey Rovers 3-08 - 2-09 Mallow (Round 1)
  - Aghabullogue 3-06 - 1-17 Aghada (Round 2)
  - Courcey Rovers 3-10 - 1-09 Bishopstown (Round 3)
- Most goals scored by a losing team: 3
  - Aghabullogue 3-06 - 1-17 Aghada (Round 2)
- Most points scored by a losing team: 12
  - Aghabullogue 0-12 - 1-10 Ballinhassig (Round 1)
  - Ballyhea 1-12 - 2-11 Mallow (Round 2)
  - Inniscarra 1-12 - 2-11 Carrigtwohill (Round 3)
  - Blarney 0-12 - 1-15 St. Catherine's (Semi-final)

=== Top scorers ===
Top scorer overall

| Rank | Player | Club | Tally | Total | Matches | Average |
|---|---|---|---|---|---|---|
| 1 | Pa Dineen | Mallow | 3-25 | 34 | 4 | 8.50 |
| 2 | Niall Murphy | Courcey Rovers | 0-33 | 33 | 6 | 5.50 |
| 3 | Darren Dineen | Ballinhassig | 0-19 | 19 | 4 | 4.75 |
| 4 | Finbarr Kelly | Ballincollig | 1-15 | 18 | 4 | 4.50 |
| 4 | Michael Hegarty | St. Catherine's | 0-18 | 18 | 4 | 4.50 |
| 5 | Séamus Hayes | Courcey Rovers | 4-05 | 17 | 5 | 3.40 |
| 5 | John Murphy | Courcey Rovers | 3-08 | 17 | 6 | 2.83 |
| 6 | Seánie O'Farrell | Carrigtwohill | 2-09 | 15 | 4 | 3.75 |
| 6 | Maurice O'Sullivan | Ballyhea | 0-15 | 15 | 3 | 5.00 |
| 6 | Adrian Shanahan | Blarney | 0-15 | 15 | 4 | 3.75 |

Top scorers in a single game

| Rank | Player | Club | Tally | Total | Opposition |
|---|---|---|---|---|---|
| 1 | Pa Dineen | Mallow | 1-09 | 12 | Ballyhea |
| 2 | Diarmuid O'Riordan | Inniscarra | 1-08 | 11 | Carrigtwohill |
| 3 | Damien Walsh | Tracton | 1-07 | 10 | Aghada |
| 3 | Pa Dineen | Mallow | 1-07 | 10 | Ballyhea |
| 4 | Maurice O'Sullivan | Ballyhea | 0-09 | 9 | Newcestown |
| 4 | Niall Murphy | Courcey Rovers | 0-09 | 9 | Ballincollig |
| 5 | Darren Ronan | Ballyhea | 1-05 | 8 | Mallow |
| 5 | Finbarr Kelly | Ballincollig | 1-05 | 8 | Newcestown |
| 5 | Finbarr Kelly | Ballincollig | 0-08 | 8 | Carrigtwohill |
| 5 | Michael Hegarty | St. Catherine's | 0-08 | 8 | Blarney |

=== Miscellaneous ===
- On 30 April 2004, Carrigtwohill's Craig Horgan became the first ever Cork Premier Intermediate Hurling Championship goal-scorer.
- St Catherine's are crowned the first Premier Intermediate Hurling Champions.
