= Leigh Desmond =

Irish hurler

Personal information
- Native name: Mac an Lia Ó Deasúnaigh (Irish)
- Born: 1988 (age 37–38) Youghal, County Cork, Ireland
- Occupation: Fitness trainer

Sport
- Sport: Hurling
- Position: Midfield
Clubs
- Years: Club
- Youghal; Imokilly
Club titles
- Cork titles: 0
College
- Years: College
- Cork Institute of Technology
College titles
- Fitzgibbon titles: 0
Inter-county*
Years	County	Apps (scores)
2008-2010	Cork	0 (0-00)
Inter-county titles
- Munster titles: 0
- All-Irelands: 0
- NHL: 0
- All Stars: 0
- *Inter County team apps and scores correct as of 01:35, 18 July 2018.

Leigh Desmond (born 1988) is an Irish hurler who plays for club side Youghal, divisional side Imokilly and at inter-county level with the Cork senior hurling team.

== Honours ==
Youghal

- Cork Premier Intermediate Hurling Championship (1): 2011
