= Courcey Rovers GAA =

Gaelic games club in County Cork, Ireland

Courcey Rovers
- Fánaithe na Cuirseacha
- Founded: 1947
- County: Cork
- Nickname: Courceys
- Colours
- Grounds: Páirc Uí Riagáin
- Coordinates: 51°39′54.62″N 8°35′56.57″W

Playing kits
Standard colours

Senior Club Championships
	All Ireland	Munster champions	Cork champions
Camogie:	0	0	1

Courcey Rovers GAA Club is a Gaelic Athletic Association club in the barony of Courceys, County Cork, Ireland. The club is affiliated to the Carrigdhoun Board and fields teams in hurling, Gaelic football and camogie.

== History ==
Located in the barony of Courceys, about 8km from Kinsale, Courcey Rovers GAA Club was established in January 1947. The club draws its players from the villages of Ballinspittle and Ballinadee, whose existing clubs amalgamated to form the new one.

Courcey Rovers has spent the majority of its existence operating in the junior grade. Initially affiliated to the Carbery Board, the club won a record-setting 16 South West JAHC titles between 1947 and 1974. In spite of these divisional successes, a Cork JAHC remained elusive. In 1975, club members voted to move to the Carrigdhoun Division.

Life in the new division resulted in Courcey Rovers winning several South East U21HHC titles. The club claimed the first of six South East JAHC titles in 1993, before winning the Cork JAHC title in 2001, after a 3–09 to 3-07 win over Charleville in the final. Courcey Rovers later claimed the Munster Club JHC title.

Courcey Rovers were subsequently promoted to the Cork IHC, before being one of the 16 founding clubs of the new Cork PIHC in 2004. A 1–17 to 1–12 win over Youghal in 2011 secured a first Cork PIHC title and senior status for the first time in the club's history. Courcey Rovers won a second Cork PIHC title in 2021.

== Honours ==
- Cork Senior Camogie Championship (1): 2020
- Cork Premier Intermediate Hurling Championship (2): 2011, 2021
- Munster Junior Club Hurling Championship (1): 2001
- Cork Junior A Hurling Championship (1): 2001
- South East Junior A Hurling Championship (6): 1993, 1997, 1999, 2001, 2018, 2019
- South East Junior A Football Championship (5): 1997, 2000, 2004, 2006, 2011
- South West Junior A Hurling Championship (15): 1947, 1948, 1951, 1953, 1954, 1955, 1956, 1957, 1964, 1965, 1966, 1968, 1970, 1973, 1974
- South West Junior B Hurling Championship (6): 1943 (as Ballinadee) ,1944 (as Ballinadee), 1945 (as Ballinspittle), 1947, 1962, 1968, 1970
- South West Junior B Football Championship (3): 1951, 1966, 1973
- Cork Intermediate Hurling League (4): 2004, 2008, 2012, 2022
- Cork Under-21 Hurling Championship (1): 1997
- South-East Under 21 "A" Hurling Championship (8) 1980, 1994, 1995, 1996, 1997, 1998, 1999, 2002
- South West Under-21 A Hurling Championship (1): 1969
- South-East Under 21 "A" Football Championship (1) 2001
- South-East Under 21 "B" Football Championship (2) 2014, 2019
- Cork Minor A Football League (1): 1994

== Notable player ==
- Seán Twomey: All-Ireland U20HC–winner (2020)
