= Inniscarra GAA =

Gaelic sports club in County Cork, Ireland

Inniscarra
- Inis Cartha
- Founded: 1886
- County: Cork
- Nickname: Scarra
- Colours
- Grounds: Páirc Dhónaill Uí Cheallacháin

Playing kits
Standard colours

Senior Club Championships
	All Ireland	Munster champions	Cork champions
Football:	0	0	0
Hurling:	0	0	0
Camogie:	0	2	4

Inniscarra Football and Hurling Club is a Gaelic Athletic Association club in Inniscarra, County Cork, Ireland. The club is affiliated to the Muskerry Board and fields teams in hurling, camogie and Gaelic football.

== History ==
Located in the parish of Inniscarra, about 10 miles west of Cork, Inniscarra GAA Club was founded in 1886. The newly established club took part in the inaugural Cork SHC in 1887. Inniscarra reached the final of that competition in 1891, but were beaten by Blackrock.

Inniscarra later operated in the junior ranks and won eight Mid Cork JHC titles between 1935 and 1975. The last title was subsequently converted into a Cork JHC title after a 5–07 to 3–08 defeat of Ballymartle in the final. Nearly 50 years after this title success, Inniscarra won the Cork PIHC title following a 3–12 to 1–17 win over Castlemartyr in a replay.

Inniscarra has also won two Mid Cork JAFC titles during their history. The club beat Ballygarvan by a point to win the Cork JAFC title in 2024.

== Honours ==
- Munster Senior Club Camogie Championship (2): 2010, 2018
- Cork Senior Camogie Championship (4): 2010, 2016, 2017, 2018
- Cork Premier Intermediate Hurling Championship (1): 2022
- Cork Junior A Hurling Championship (1): 1975
- Cork Junior A Football Championship (1) 2024
- Cork Minor A Football Championship (2): 1995, 2003
- Mid Cork Junior A Hurling Championship (9): 1935, 1941 (as Inniscarra Valley), 1942, 1945, 1947, 1965, 1968, 1975, 2020
- Mid Cork Junior A Football Championship (1): 1989, 2024

== Notable players ==
- Ger Manley: Munster SHC-winner (1992)
- Pat McDonnell: All-Ireland SHC-winner (1970, 1976, 1977, 1978)
- Seán O'Donoghue: Munster SHC-winner (2018, 2025)
- Tomás Ryan: All-Ireland SHC-winner (1970)
- Rena Buckley: All-Ireland Senior Camogie Championship & All-Ireland Senior Ladies' Football Championship 18 times; Camogie All Stars Awards & Ladies' Gaelic Football All Stars Awards 11 times

== Exteran links ==
- Inniscarra GAA website (archived 2010)
- Club facebook page
