= Cork Premier Junior Hurling Championship =

- Current season or competition: 2026 Cork Premier Junior Hurling Championship
- Irish: Craobh Iomána Príomh-Shóisearach Chorcaí
- Code: Hurling
- Founded: 2022; 4 years ago
- Region: Cork (GAA)
- No. of teams: 12
- Title holders: Kilshannig (1st title)
- Most titles: Multiple teams (1 titles)
- Sponsors: Co-Op Superstores
- TV partner: Clubber
- Official website: Official website

The Cork Premier Junior Hurling Championship (known for sponsorship reasons as the Co-Op Superstores Cork Premier Junior Hurling Championship and abbreviated to the Cork PJHC) is an annual hurling competition organised by the Cork County Board of the Gaelic Athletic Association and contested by the top-ranking junior clubs in the county of Cork in Ireland. It is the fifth tier overall in the entire Cork hurling championship system.

The Cork Premier Junior Championship was introduced in 2022 following a restructuring of the various intermediate and junior championships.

In its current format, the Cork Premier Junior Championship begins in mid-summer. The 12 participating club teams are into three groups of four teams and play each other in a round-robin system. The three group winners and the three runners-up proceed to the knockout phase that culminates with the final match at Páirc Uí Rinn. The winner of the Cork Premier Junior Championship qualifies for the subsequent Munster Club Championship.

Kilshannig are the title holders, after beating St Catherine's by 1-23 to 2-19 in the 2026 final.

== History ==
In March 2019, Cork County Board delegates voted on the restructuring of the entire Cork hurling championship system following an extensive review process. The plan hoped to reduce the number of teams in the top four tiers to 48, a move which required a restructuring of the intermediate and junior grades. The result was the creation of the Cork Lower Intermediate Hurling Championship, a two-year temporary championship which would result in several teams being regraded to Junior and the championship being eventually discontinued. In February 2022, the County Board took a further vote on the future of the club junior and intermediate championships. Delegates voted in favour of Option B which saw the Lower Intermediate Championship being rebranded as the Premier Junior Championship.

== Format ==
=== Group stage ===
The 12 teams are divided into three groups of four. Over the course of the group stage, each team plays once against the others in the group, resulting in each team being guaranteed at least three games. Two points are awarded for a win, one for a draw and zero for a loss. The teams are ranked in the group stage table by points gained, then scoring difference and then their head-to-head record. The top two teams in each group qualify for the knockout stage.

=== Knockout stage ===
Quarter-finals: Two lone quarter-finals featuring the four lowest-placed qualifying teams from the group stage. Two teams qualify for the next round.

Semi-finals: The two quarter-final winners and the top two highest-placed qualifying teams from the group stage contest this round. The two winners from these games advance to the final.

Final: The two semi-final winners contest the final. The winning team are declared champions.

=== Promotion and relegation ===
At the end of the championship, the winning team was automatically promoted to the Cork Intermediate A Championship for the following season. The two worst-ranked teams from the group stage took part in a playoff, with the losing team being relegated to the Cork Junior A Championship.

== Teams ==
=== 2027 teams ===
The 12 teams due to compete in the 2027 Cork Premier Junior Hurling Championship include:

Team	Location	Division	Colours	Position in 2026	In Championship since	Championship titles (JAHC)	Last championship title (JAHC)
Argideen Rangers	Timoleague	Carbery	Maroon and white	Semi-finals	2022	1	1996
Ballygarvan	Ballygarvan	Carrigdhoun	Red and white	Quarter-finals	2022	1	2004
Barryroe	Barryroe	Carbery	Blue and navy	Semi-finals	2022	1	2007
Cloughduv	Cloughduv	Muskerry	Green and yellow	Quarter-finals	2025	3	2018
Glen Rovers	Blackpool	Seandún	Green, yellow and black	Group stage	2022	2	1950
Mayfield	Mayfield	Seandún	Red and white	Group stage	2026	2	2016
Nemo Rangers	Trabeg	Seandún	Black and green	Group stage	2024	2	2023
Russell Rovers	Shanagarry	Imokilly	Black and amber	Intermediate A champions	2027	1	2019
St Catherine's	Ballynoe	Imokilly	Purple and yellow	Runners-up	2022	2	2017
St Finbarr's	Togher	Seandún	Blue and yellow	Group stage	2022	3	1956
Tracton	Tracton	Carrigdhoun	Green and red	Group stage	2025	3	2024
Donoughmore / Killeagh	TBD	TBD	TBD	Junior A champions	2027	TBD	2026

== Sponsorship ==
Co-Op Superstores were unveiled as the title sponsor for all of Cork GAA's hurling championships in July 2020.

== Qualification for subsequent competitions ==
The Cork Premier Junior Championship winners qualify for the subsequent Munster Junior Club Hurling Championship.

== Trophy and medals ==
The Jimmy O'Mahony Cup is the current prize for winning the championship. It was commissioned to honour Jimmy O'Mahony who served as secretary of the Newcestown club from 1967 until his death in September 2020.

In accordance with GAA rules, the County Board awards a set of gold medals to the championship winners. The medals depict a stylised version of the Cork GAA crest.

== Roll of Honour ==
=== By club ===
#	Club	Titles	Runners-up	Championships won	Championships runners-up
1	Ballygiblin	1	0	2022	—
1	Erin's Own	1	0	2023	—
1	Russell Rovers	1	0	2024	—
1	Kilbrittain	1	0	2025	—
1	Kilshannig	1	0	2026	—
6	St Catherine's	0	3	—	2023, 2024, 2026
6	Tracton	0	1	—	2022
6	Glen Rovers	0	1	—	2025

=== By Division ===
Division	Titles	Runners-Up	Total	Most recent success
Imokilly	2	3	5	2024
Avondhu	2	0	2	2026
Carbery	1	0	1	2025
Carrigdhoun	0	1	1	—
Seandún	0	1	1	—
Duhallow	0	0	0	—
Muskerry	0	0	0	—

== List of Finals ==
=== Legend ===
- Gold – Munster junior club champions
- Silver – Munster junior club runners-up

=== List of Cork PJHC finals ===
Year	Winners		Runners-up		Winning captain(s)	Venue	#
Year	Club	Score	Club	Score	Winning captain(s)	Venue	#
2026	Kilshannig	1–23	St Catherine's	2–19	Kieran Twomey; Darragh O'Sullivan	Páirc Uí Chaoimh	
2025	KIlbrittain	0–22	Glen Rovers	2–15	Philip Wall	Páirc Uí Chaoimh	
2024	Russell Rovers	3–13	St Catherine's	0–15	Ciarán Sheehan	Páirc Uí Chaoimh	
2023	Erin's Own	1–14	St Catherine's	2–09	James McMahon; Tom Foley	Páirc Uí Chaoimh	
2022	Ballygiblin	2–19	Tracton	1–12	Fionn Herlihy	Páirc Uí Chaoimh	

== See also ==
- Cork Junior A Hurling Championship
- Cork Junior B Hurling Championship
