= 2026 Cork Premier Junior Hurling Championship =

Annual hurling competition season

- Dates: 1 August – 23 October 2026
- Teams: 12
- Sponsor: Co-Op Superstores
- Champions: Kilshannig (1st title); Kieran Twomey (captain); Darragh O'Sullivan (captain); Pat Murphy (manager)
- Runners-up: St Catherine's; Conor Hegarty (captain); Gary Hartnett (manager)
- Relegated: Milford

Tournament statistics
- Matches played: 24
- Goals scored: 59 (2.46 per match)
- Points scored: 877 (36.54 per match)
- Top scorer: Shane Horgan (1–41)

The 2026 Cork Premier Junior Hurling Championship was the fifth staging of the Cork Premier Junior Hurling Championship since its establishment by the Cork County Board in 2022. The draw for the group stage placings took place on 9 December 2025. The championship ran from 1 August to 23 October 2026.

Milford's relegation saw the team return to the North Cork JAHC for the first time in 45 years.

The final was played on 23 October 2025 at SuperValu Páirc Uí Chaoimh in Cork, between Kilshannig and St Catherine's, in what was their first ever meeting. Kilshannig won the match by 1-23 to 2-19 to claim their first ever championship title.

Shane Horgan was the championship's top scorer with 1–41.

== Team changes ==
=== To Championship ===
Relegated from the Cork Intermediate A Hurling Championship

- Mayfield

Promoted from the Cork Junior A Hurling Championship

- Kilshannig

=== From Championship ===
Promoted to the Cork Intermediate A Hurling Championship

- Kilbrittain

Relegated to the Duhallow Junior A Hurling Championship

- Meelin

== Group 1 ==
=== Group 1 table ===
Semi-finalist Quarter-finalist Relegation playoff

Team	Matches				Score			Pts
Team	Pld	W	D	L	For	Against	Diff	Pts
Kilshannig	3	3	0	0	76	57	19	6
Ballygarvan	3	1	1	1	81	66	15	3
Glen Rovers	3	1	0	2	48	78	-30	2
Nemo Rangers	3	0	1	2	55	59	-4	1

=== Group 1 results ===
1 August 2026 Round 1	Kilshannig	1-16 - 0-16	Nemo Rangers	Glanworth Grounds
	P Walsh 0-6, Diarmuid O'Sullivan 1-1, J Twomey 0-3, C Ruby 0-3, K Twomey 0-2, T Cunningham 0-1.		S Horgan 0-8, C Horgan 0-3, A O'Donovan 0-1, C Yelland 0-1, B Twohig 0-1, G Barrett 0-1, P O'Dwyer 0-1.

2 August 2026 Round 1	Ballygarvan	4-20 - 1-13	Glen Rovers	Ballymah GAA Field
	D O'Connor 0-8, M Cussen 1-3, R O'Halloran 1-2, D Mackey 1-0, S Fenton 0-2, E O'Connor 0-1, C McIntyre 0-1, N Dowd 0-1.

22 August 2026 Round 2	Glen Rovers	0-13 - 1-25	Kilshannig	Mourneabbey Grounds
			A Hourigan 0-5, J Twomey 0-5, Diarmuid O'Sullivan 1-1, P Walsh 0-4, T Cunningham 0-3, C Ruby 0-2, K Twomey 0-2, R Crowley 0-1, Darragh O'Sullivan 0-1, S Lyons 0-1.

23 August 2026 Round 2	Nemo Rangers	1-18 - 0-21	Ballygarvan	Carrigaline Grounds
	S Horgan 1-10, R Dalton 0-4, P O'Dwyer 0-1, G Barrett 0-1, B Twohig 0-1, J Kearney 0-1.	Report

5 September 2026 Round 3	Ballygarvan	2-22 - 2-23	Kilshannig	Éire Óg Grounds
	S Brady 1-6, D O'Connor 0-8, R O'Hallora 0-5, C McIntyre 1-0, N Dowd 0-2, E O'Connor 0-1.		P Walsh 1-3, A Hourigan 0-6, J Twomey 0-5, Diarmuid O'Sullivan 1-2, C Ruby 0-3, T Cunningham 0-2, K Smith 0-2.

5 September 2026 Round 3	Glen Rovers	1-16 - 2-12	Nemo Rangers	Whitechurch Complex
		Report	S Horgan 0-11 (0-10 f).

== Group 2 ==
=== Group 2 table ===
Semi-finalist Quarter-finalist Relegation playoff

Team	Matches				Score			Pts
Team	Pld	W	D	L	For	Against	Diff	Pts
St Catherine's	3	3	0	0	67	56	11	6
Cloughduv	3	1	0	2	68	66	2	2
Tracton	3	1	0	2	65	64	1	2
Milford (R)	3	1	0	2	54	68	-14	2

=== Group 2 results ===
1 August 2026 Round 1	Milford	1-20 - 2-16	Tracton	Grenagh Grounds

1 August 2026 Round 1	Cloughduv	1-20 - 1-22	St Catherine's	Ted Hanley Memorial Park
	B Verling 1-2, M Verling 0-3, M Walsh 0-3, E McNabola 0-2, H Murphy 0-2, J Moynihan 0-2, S Barry 0-1, J Kelleher 0-1, E Clifford 0-1, O O'Driscoll 0-1, A Twomey 0-1, M O'Leary 0-1.		D Mangan 0-6, D O'Connell 1-2, S O'Donoghue 0-3, M Mulcahy 0-3, K O'Donoghue 0-3, B Mulcahy 0-1, C Hegarty 0-1, C Leamy 0-1, C Hayes 0-1, O Fitzgerald 0-1.

21 August 2026 Round 2	St Catherine's	1-23 - 1-16	Milford	Kildorrery Grounds
	D Mangan 0-11, B Mulcahy 1-5, S O'Donoghue 0-3, E Davis 0-2, K O'Donoghue 0-1, E O'Riordan 0-1.		A Watson 1-3, C O'Gorman 0-5, E Dillon 0-4, M O'Flynn 0-1, K O'Flynn 0-1, T Curran 0-1, T O'Flynn 0-1.

22 August 2026 Round 2	Tracton	2-23 - 3-16	Cloughduv	Belgooly Grounds
	C Quinn 0-15 (0-13 f), C Lowney 2-0, J Good, M O'Sullivan, M Castleton, A Lyons 0-2 each.	Report	M Verling 1-9 (0-6 f), S O'Leary 1-1, E McNabola 1-0, B Verling 0-2, S O'Donoghue 0-3 f, A Twomey 0-1.

5 September 2026 Round 3	Cloughduv	0-20 - 0-12	Milford	Kanturk Grounds
	M Verling 0-5, E Clifford 0-5, B Verling 0-2, E Moynihan 0-2, J Kelleher 0-2, I Houlihan 0-2, O O'Driscoll 0-1, A Twomey 0-1.	Report	C O'Gorman 0-5, E Dillon 0-2, D Hannigan 0-2, A Watson 0-1, M O'Flynn 0-1, H O'Gorman 0-1.

5 September 2026 Round 3	St Catherine's	0-16 - 0-14	Tracton	Páirc Uí Rinn
	D Mangan 0-5 (0-2f, 0-1 65), B Mulcahy 0-4, D O’Conell, M Mulcahy 0-2 each, E Davis (0-1f), S O’Donoghue, K O’Donoghue 0-1 each.	Report	C Quinn 0-7 (0-5f, 0-2 65), M Byrne 0-3, P O’Riordan, D O’Riordan, C Webb, G McGuinness 0-1 each.

== Group 3 ==
=== Group 3 table ===
Quarter-finalist

Team	Matches				Score			Pts
Team	Pld	W	D	L	For	Against	Diff	Pts
Barryroe	3	2	0	1	66	57	9	4
Argideen Rangers	3	2	0	1	67	51	16	4
St Finbarr's	3	1	0	2	63	78	-15	2
Mayfield	3	1	0	2	61	71	-10	2

=== Group 3 results ===
1 August 2026 Round 1	Barryroe	2-18 - 0-16	St Finbarr's	Belgooly Grounds
	O O'Donovan 1-7 (0-3 f), R O'Donovan 0-6, L Murphy 1-0, T Ó Buchalla 0-2, A McSweeney, J Murphy, M Whelton (f) 0-1 each.	Report	D Murray (0-1 f), S Cunningham, C Buckley 0-4 each, A Buckley 0-2, C Crowley, S Callanan 0-1 each.

2 August 2026 Round 1	Mayfield	1-08 - 2-16	Argideen Rangers	Páirc Naomh Eoin
	N Kelly 0-4, S O'Donovan 0-3, D O'Neill 1-0, C O'Donovan 0-1.		JM O'Callaghan 0-7, D O'Donovan 1-0, S Walsh 1-0, C Twomey 0-2, James Crowley 0-2, P Flynn 0-2, S Murray 0-1, M Lawton 0-1, E Lawton 0-1.

21 August 2026 Round 2	St Finbarr's	1-25 - 1-23	Mayfield	Éire Óg Grounds
	S Cunningham 1-4.	Report

23 August 2026 Round 2	Argideen Rangers	0-17 - 1-18	Barryroe	Clonakilty GAA Complex
	C Twomey 0-4, S Walsh 0-3, F Butler 0-2, James Crowley 0-2, D O'Donovan 0-2, P Flynn 0-1, E Lawton 0-1, P Butler 0-1, JM O'Callaghan 0-1.		L Murphy 1-1, O O'Donovan 0-4, T Ó Buachalla 0-3, J Murphy 0-2, B O'Donovan 0-2, R O'Donovan 0-2, M Whelton 0-2, M Ryan 0-1, A McSweeney 0-1.

5 September 2026 Round 3	Argideen Rangers	4-16 - 2-13	St Finbarr's	Ballymartle Grounds
	S Walsh 2-5, JM O’Callaghan 1-3 (0-1 f), P Flynn 0-5 (0-3 f), C O’Donovan 1-1, D Walsh, J Crowley 0-1 each.	Report	C Keane 0-6 (0-4 f), I O’Callaghan 1-1, D Murray 0-3, S Callanan 1-0, C O’Connor 0-2, A Barry 0-1.

5 September 2026 Round 3	Mayfield	1-21 - 1-18	Barryroe	Belgooly Grounds
	N Kelly 1-8 (0-5 f), D O’Neill 0-5, D Lucey 0-4, D Malone 0-2, E Scanlon, Michael J Coffey 0-1 each.	Report	D Ó Buchalla 1-3, L Murphy 0-4 (0-3 f), R O’Donovan 0-3 (0-1 f), T Ó Buchalla 0-2, J Maloney, M Whelton (f), A McSweeney, J Murphy, D McCarthy, S Holland 0-1 each.

== Relegation stage ==
=== Relegation final ===
20 September 2026 Playoff	Nemo Rangers	0-21 - 1-16	Milford	Ballyhooly Grounds
	S Horgan 0-12 (0-7f), G Barrett 0-2, C Kiely 0-2, J Kearney 0-2, R Dalton 0-1, C Yelland 0-1, P O’Dwyer 0-1.	Report	B Murphy 1-3, C O’Gorman 0-6 (0-4f), E Dillon 0-5 (0-1f), A Watson 0-1, M O’Flynn 0-1.

== Knockout stage ==
=== Quarter-finals ===
19 September 2026 Quarter-final	Barryroe	3-19 - 0-26	Cloughduv	St Mary's Park
	L Murphy 3-6, D Ó Buachalla 0-3, R O'Donovan 0-2, T Ó Buachalla 0-2, A McSweeney 0-2, O O'Donovan 0-2, M Whelton 0-1, J Murphy 0-1.		M Verling 0-10, E Clifford 0-3, E Moynihan 0-3, B Verling 0-3, S O'Leary 0-3, O O'Driscoll 0-1, M O'Leary 0-1, E McNabola 0-1, I Holohan 0-1.

20 September 2026 Quarter-final	Argideen Rangers	1-21 - 0-14	Ballygarvan	Páirc Uí Riagáin
	JM O’Callaghan 0-6, P Flynn 0-5 (0-2 f), F Walsh 0-4, C O’Donovan 1-1, D O’Donovan 0-2, F Butler, S Henchion, E Lawton 0-1 each.	Report	D O’Connor 0-6 (1f, 2×65), M Kennefick 0-3 (1f), E O’Connor 0-2 (1f), K Murphy, S Brady, K Lyons 0-1 each.

=== Semi-finals ===
3 October 2026 Semi-final	St Catherine's	5-19 - 1-18	Barryroe	Ballymah GAA Field
	B Mulcahy 2-3, G O’Brien 2-0, D Mangan 0-6 (0-3 f, 0-2 65), M Mulcahy 1-1, E Davis 0-3 f, J Temple, O Fitzgerald 0-2 each, D O’Connell, D Morrison 0-1 each.	Report	O O’Donovan 1-3 (0-1 f), T Ó Buachalla, A McSweeney (0-1 f) 0-3 each, S Holland, L Murphy 0-2 each, J Moloney, C Dineen, R O’Donovan, M Whelton (f), D Ó Buachalla 0-1 each.

4 October 2026 Semi-final	Kilshannig	2-24 - 0-15	Argideen Rangers	Coachford Sportsfield
	J Twomey 1-4, A Hourigan 0-6, Diarmuid O’Sullivan 1-3, P Walsh 0-4 (3f), K Twomey 0-4 (1f), R Crowley, K Smith, D Murphy 0-1 each.	Report	P Flynn 0-5 (4f), D O’Donovan, E Lawton, C Twomey, J Crowley 0-2 each, B Fleming 0-1, S Murray 0-1 (1f).

=== Final ===
23 October 2026 Final	St Catherine's	2-19 - 1-23	Kilshannig	SuperValu Páirc Uí Chaoimh
	D Mangan 0-6 (0-5 f), M Mulcahy 1-1, G O’Brien 0-4, S O’Donoghue 1-0, K O’Donoghue 0-2, E Davis (0-1 f), C Leamy, D O’Connell, J Neville, J Temple, B Mulcahy 0-1 each.	Report	K Twomey 0-7 (0-4 f), Diarmuid O’Sullivan 1-2, P Walsh 0-4 (0-1 f), J Twomey, C Ruby 0-3 each, C O’Shea, É O’Hanlon, T Cunningham, K Smith 0-1 each.	Referee: N Hayes (Blarney)

== Championship statistics ==
=== Top scorers ===
Rank	Player	Club	Tally	Total	Matches	Average
1	Shane Horgan	Nemo Rangers	1-41	44	4	11.00
2	Daniel Mangan	St Catherine's	0-34	34	5	6.80
3	Mark Verling	Cloughduv	1-27	30	4	7.50
4	Luke Murphy	Barryroe	5-13	28	5	5.60
5	Diarmuid O'Sullivan	Kilshannig	5-09	24	5	4.80
5	Paddy Walsh	Kilshannig	1-21	24	5	4.80
