= 2024 Cork Premier Junior Hurling Championship =

- Dates: 2 August – 3 November 2023
- Teams: 12
- Sponsor: Co-Op Superstores
- Champions: Russell Rovers (1st title); Ciarán Sheehan (captain); Dave Dorgan (manager)
- Runners-up: St Catherine's; Eoghan O'Riordan (captain); Conor Hegarty (captain); Denis Walsh (manager)
- Relegated: Douglas

Tournament statistics
- Matches played: 24
- Goals scored: 41 (1.71 per match)
- Points scored: 798 (33.25 per match)
- Top scorer(s): Rory Galvin (1-45)

The 2024 Cork Premier Junior Hurling Championship was the third staging of the Cork Premier Junior Hurling Championship since its establishment by the Cork County Board in 2022. The draw for the group stage placings took place on 14 December 2023. The championship ran from 2 August to 3 November 2024.

The final was played on 3 November 2024 at SuperValu Páirc Uí Chaoimh in Cork, between Russell Rovers and St Catherine's, in what was their first ever meeting in a final in this grade. Russell Rovers won the match by 3-13 to 0-15 to claim their first ever championship title.

Rory Galvin was the championship's top scorer with 1-45.

== Team changes ==
=== To Championship ===
Relegated from the Cork Intermediate A Hurling Championship

- Douglas

Promoted from the Cork Junior A Hurling Championship

- Nemo Rangers

=== From Championship ===
Promoted to the Cork Intermediate A Hurling Championship

- Erin's Own

Relegated to the South East Junior A Hurling Championship

- Tracton

== Group A ==
=== Group A table ===
Knockout stage Relegation playoff

Team	Matches				Score			Pts
Team	Pld	W	D	L	For	Against	Diff	Pts
Russell Rovers	3	3	0	0	79	49	30	6
Milford	3	2	0	1	73	60	13	4
Meelin	3	1	0	2	51	72	-21	2
Douglas	3	0	0	3	46	68	-22	0

=== Group A results ===
3 August 2024 Round 1	Milford	1-13 - 1-23	Russell Rovers	Ballygiblin Grounds
	H O'Gorman 0-6, T O'Flynn 1-2, C O'Gorman 0-1, M O'Flynn 0-1, K O'Flynn 0-1, A Watson 0-1, T Curran 0-1.	Report	B Hartnett 1-6, L Duggan-Murray 0-5, F Murray 0-2, M O’Dwyer 0-2, K Moynihan 0-2, J Beausang 0-2, D Moynihan 0-1, R Cummins 0-1.

4 August 2024 Round 1	Douglas	1-10 - 0-17	Meelin	Glanworth Grounds
	D Murphy 0-4, R Hanley 0-4, G O'Shea 1-0, I Lucey 0-1, S St Ledger 0-1.	Report	N Linehan 0-11, J McAuliffe 0-2, J O’Callaghan 0-1, S Curtin 0-1, C Curtin 0-1, D Buckley 0-1.

24 August 2024 Round 2	Meelin	1-14 - 4-19	Milford	Freemount Grounds
	J Curtin 1-2, N Linehan 0-5, J O'Callaghan 0-3, M McAuliffe 0-2, C Curtin 0-1.	Report	A Watson 4-1, H O’Gorman 0-11, C O’Gorman 0-2, M O'Flynn 0-2, E Dillon 0-1, B Murphy 0-1, E Buckley 0-1.

25 August 2024 Round 2	Russell Rovers	3-16 - 2-10	Douglas	Páirc Séamus de Barra
	J Beausang 2-0, B Hartnett 1-2, Luke Duggan-Murray 0-5.	Report

6 September 2024 Round 3	Douglas	0-17 - 1-23	Milford	Mallow GAA Complex
	D Murphy 0-9, B Hartnett 0-2, C Lucas 0-2, S Nyhan 0-1, S St Leger 0-1, F Barry 0-1, B O'Connor 0-1.	Report	H O'Gorman 0-7, B Murphy 1-3, T O’Flynn 0-4, C O'Gorman 0-2, E Buckley 0-2, E Dillon 0-2, R Hannigan 0-1, M O'Flynn 0-1, A Watson 0-1.

6 September 2024 Round 3	Meelin	1-14 - 1-25	Russell Rovers	Páirc Mac Gearailt
	N Linehan 0-8, J Curtin 1-0, J O'Callaghan 0-2, B O'Sullivan 0-1, Ciarán Curtin 0-1, M O'Keeffe 0-1, S Hehir 0-1.	Report	B Hartnett 0-6, M O’Dwyer 1-1, K Walsh 0-4, R Cummins 0-3, L Duggan-Murray 0-2, J McGrath 0-2, D Moynihan 0-2, K Moynihan 0-2, D Ruddy 0-1, R Walsh 0-1, P Lane 0-1.

== Group B ==
=== Group B table ===
Knockout stage

Team	Matches				Score			Pts
Team	Pld	W	D	L	For	Against	Diff	Pts
Ballygarvan	3	3	0	0	70	52	18	6
Nemo Rangers	3	1	1	1	56	61	-5	3
Kilbrittain	3	0	2	1	53	56	-3	2
Barryroe	3	0	1	2	54	64	-10	1

=== Group B results ===
2 August 2024 Round 1	Barryroe	0-17 - 0-17	Kilbrittain	Ahamilla Grounds
	O O'Donovan 0-10, S Holland 0-2, D Ó Buachalla 0-2, T Ó Buachalla 0-2, D Murphy 0-1.	Report	M Hickey 0-12, R Crowley 0-2, J O'Donovan 0-2, P Wall 0-1.

3 August 2024 Round 1	Ballygarvan	3-16 - 1-12	Nemo Rangers	Ted Hanley Memorial Park
	M Cussen 0-7, G White 1-2, R O’Halloran 1-2.	Report

24 August 2024 Round 2	Kilbrittain	0-19 - 1-19	Ballygarvan	Tracton Grounds
	M Hickey 0-15 (0-13 f, 0-1 65), P Wall, S Shorten, D Harrington, R Crowley 0-1 each.	Report	M Cussen 0-9 (0-6 f, 0-1 65), N O'Dowd 1-3, D O'Connor, K Lyons R O'Halloran 0-2 each, P O'Halloran 0-1.

25 August 2024 Round 2	Nemo Rangers	1-21 - 3-10	Barryroe	Ballymaw Grounds
	S Horgan 0-10, B Cripps 1-0, R Dalton 0-3, A Burns 0-2, C Kiely 0-2, M Cronin 0-1, G Barrett 0-1, J Kearney 0-1, J Masters 0-1.	Report	O O'Donovan 1-5 (4f), T Ó Buachalla 1-1, S O'Riordan 1-0, D McCarthy 0-1, Donal Ó Buachalla 0-1, J Moloney 0-1, R O'Donovan 0-1.

6 September 2024 Round 3	Barryroe	1-15 - 2-17	Ballygarvan	Cloughduv Grounds
	D Ó Buachalla 0-7 (0-3 f, 0-2 65), R O’Donovan 1-1, A McSweeney, N Whelton (f), D O’Driscoll 0-2 each, S Holland 0-1.	Report	E O’Connor 1-2, S Brady 1-0, R O’Halloran, M Cussen (0-3 f) 0-4 each, N Dowd, S Fenton 0-2 each, M O’Mahony, G White, D Mackey (f) 0-1 each.

6 September 2024 Round 3	Kilbrittain	1-14 - 0-17	Nemo Rangers	Castle Grounds
	B Butler 0-7 f, P Wall 1-1, D Harrington 0-3, T Sheehan, R Crowley, S Shorten 0-1 each.	Report	S Horgan 0-9 f, K O’Donovan, M Cronin, R Dalton 0-2 each, J Masters (f), B Cripps 0-1 each.

== Group C ==
=== Group C table ===
Knockout stage Relegation playoff

Team	Matches				Score			Pts
Team	Pld	W	D	L	For	Against	Diff	Pts
Glen Rovers	3	3	0	0	57	46	11	6
St Catherine's	3	2	0	1	66	58	8	4
St Finbarr's	3	1	0	2	53	61	-8	2
Argideen Rangers	3	0	0	3	50	61	-11	0

=== Group C results ===
3 August 2024 Round 1	St Catherine's	1-15 - 1-16	Glen Rovers	Páirc Lios gCúl
	S O’Donoghue 0-5, E Davis 0-4, M Mulcahy 1-0, R O'Connell 0-2, B Mulcahy 0-2, O Fitzgerald 0-1, R Galvin 0-1.	Report	C Dorris 1-7, L Quilligan 0-3, S Busteed 0-2, Z Lynch 0-2, E Murphy 0-1, C Martin 0-1.

4 August 2024 Round 1	Argideen Rangers	0-16 - 1-17	St Finbarr's	Belgooly Grounds
	JM O'Callaghan 0-7, P Butler 0-3, S Walsh 0-3, D O'Donovan 0-2, B Foley 0-2.	Report	C O'Connor 0-7, I Lordan 1-3, K O'Flynn 0-3, J O'Brien 0-2, C Steele 0-1, A Casey 0-1.

23 August 2024 Round 2	Glen Rovers	0-18 - 0-13	Argideen Rangers	Riverstick Grounds
	C Dorris 0-10, L Quilligan 0-4, E Murphy 0-3, S Busteed 0-1.	Report	JM O'Callaghan 0-10, C O'Donovan 0-1, C Lehane 0-1, P Butler 0-1.

25 August 2024 Round 2	St Finbarr's	0-18 - 0-25	St Catherine's	Rostellan Grounds
	C O'Connor 0-11, C Keane 0-1, J O'Brien 0-1, D Murray 0-1, A Buckley 0-1, K O'Flynn 0-1, I Lordan 0-1, C Steele 0-1.	Report	R Galvin 0-12, J Hayes 0-3, M Mulcahy 0-2, E Condon 0-2, W Leamy 0-2, G O'Brien 0-1 O Fitzgerald 0-1, K Barry 0-1, E Davis 0-1.

6 September 2024 Round 3	Glen Rovers	0-20 - 0-15	St Finbarr's	Páirc Uí Rinn
	C Dorris 0-7 (0-1 f), E Murphy 0-4, L Quilligan 0-3, D Coughlan 0-2, A O’Sullivan, S Busteed, Z Lynch, G Kennifick 0-1 each.	Report	I Lordan 0-4 (0-2 f), K O’Flynn 0-3, C Keane, S Callanan 0-2 each, R O’Sullivan, D Murray, C Steele, J O’Brien 0-1 each.

6 September 2024 Round 3	St Catherine's	1-20 - 0-21	Argideen Rangers	Páirc Séamus de Barra
	R Galvin 0-10, B Mulcahy 0-4, E Condon 1-0, K Wallace 0-3, J Neville 0-1, S O'Donoghue 0-1, E Davis 0-1.	Report	JM O’Callaghan 0-9, F Butler 0-4, S Maxwell 0-2, F Walsh 0-2, P Butler 0-2, C Lehane 0-1, S Walsh 0-1.

== Knockout stage ==
=== Bracket ===
Quarter-Finals
Glen Rovers (Seandun)	0-16
Nemo Rangers (Seandun)	2-13
Milford (Avondhu)	0-19
St Catherine's (Imokilly)	1-17

Semi-Finals
Russell Rovers (Imokilly)	1-19
Nemo Rangers (Seandun)	1-12
Ballygarvan (Avondhu)	1-14
St Catherine's (Imokilly)	0-18

Final
Russell Rovers (Imokilly)	3-13
St Catherine's (Imokilly)	0-15

=== Relegation playoff ===
21 September 2024 Playoff	Argideen Rangers	0-17 - 0-16	Douglas	Oven Grounds
	JM O'Callaghan 0-7.	Report

=== Quarter-finals ===
21 September 2024 Quarter-final	Glen Rovers	0-16 - 2-13	Nemo Rangers	Ballincollig Grounds
		Report	S Horgan 0-6, J Kearney 1-0, E Dilloughrey 1-1, A O'Donovan 0-1, C Kiely 0-1, M Cronin 0-1, A Burns 0-1.

21 September 2024 Quarter-final	Milford	0-19 - 1-17	St Catherine's	Kildorrery Grounds
	H O'Gorman 0-12, C O'Gorman 0-2, E Buckley 0-2, M O'Flynn 0-1, A Watson 0-1, E Dillon 0-1.	Report	R Galvin 1-4, E Davis 0-5, S O'Donoghue 0-4, O Fitzgerald 0-2, S Cotter 0-1, J Hayes 0-1.

=== Semi-finals ===
4 October 2024 Semi-final	Ballygarvan	1-14 - 0-18	St Catherine's	Páirc Uí Rinn
	R O’Halloran 1-3, G White 0-4 f, M Cussen 0-2 f, M O’Mahony, F Mackey (f), E O’Connor, S Brady, C O’Regan 0-1 each.	Report	R Galvin 0-12 (0-9 f), K Barry, S O’Donoghue 0-2 each, O Fitzgerald, E Condon 0-1 each.

19 October 2024 Semi-final	Russell Rovers	1-19 - 1-12	Nemo Rangers	Páirc Séamus de Barra
	J Beausang (1-11, 1-8 frees, 0-1 65), B Hartnett (0-3), K Moynihan (0-2), L Duggan Murray, K Walsh and F Murray (0-1 each).	Report	S Horgan (0-6, 0-3 frees, 0-1 65), A Cronin (1-0), C Horgan (0-2), J Masters (free), A O’Donovan, M Cronin and A Burns (0-1 each).

=== Final ===
3 November 2024 Final	St Catherine's	0-15 - 3-13	Russell Rovers	Supervalu Páirc Uí Chaoimh
	R Galvin 0-6 (0-2f), B Mulcahy 0-4, E Davis (0-1f), K Wallace, S O’Donoghue, D Mangan (0-1f) 0-1 each.	Report	J Beausang 0-7 (0-2f, 0-1 65), L Duggan Murray 1-2, B Hartnett 1-1, C Sheehan 1-0, R Cummins, K Walsh, K Moynihan 0-1 each.	Referee: C Walsh (Nemo Rangers)

== Championship statistics ==
=== Top scorers ===
Rank	Player	Club	Tally	Total	Matches	Average
1	Rory Galvin	St Catherine's	1-45	48	6	8.00
2	Henry O'Gorman	Milford	0-36	36	4	9.00
3	John Michael O'Callaghan	Argideen Rangers	0-33	33	4	8.25
