= 2025 Cork Premier Junior Hurling Championship =

Annual hurling competition season

- Dates: 1 August - 17 October 2025
- Teams: 12
- Sponsor: Co-Op Superstores
- Champions: Kilbrittain (1st title); Philip Wall (captain); Joe Ryan (manager)
- Runners-up: Glen Rovers; Darragh Coughlan (captain); Keith McCarthy (manager)
- Relegated: Meelin

Tournament statistics
- Matches played: 24
- Goals scored: 45 (1.88 per match)
- Points scored: 845 (35.21 per match)
- Top scorer(s): Mark Hickey (0-38)

The 2025 Cork Premier Junior Hurling Championship was the fourth staging of the Cork Premier Junior Hurling Championship since its establishment by the Cork County Board in 2022. The draw for the group stage placings took place on 10 December 2024. The championship ran from 1 August to 17 October 2025.

The final was played on 17 October 2025 at SuperValu Páirc Uí Chaoimh in Cork, between Kilbrittain and Glen Rovers, in what was their first ever meeting in a final in this grade. Kilbrittain won the match by 0-22 to 2-15 to claim their first ever championship title.

Kilbrittain's Mark Hickey was the championship's top scorer with 0-38.

== Team changes ==
=== To Championship ===
Relegated from the Cork Intermediate A Hurling Championship

- Cloughduv

Promoted from the Cork Junior A Hurling Championship

- Tracton

=== From Championship ===
Promoted to the Cork Intermediate A Hurling Championship

- Russell Rovers

Relegated to the Cork City Junior A Hurling Championship

- Douglas

== Group A ==
=== Group A table ===
Semi-finalist Quarter-finalist Relegation playoff

Team	Matches				Score			Pts
Team	Pld	W	D	L	For	Against	Diff	Pts
Glen Rovers	3	2	1	0	66	54	12	5
St Catherine's	3	2	0	1	57	43	14	4
St Finbarr's	3	1	1	1	71	61	10	3
Meelin	3	0	0	3	50	86	-36	0

=== Group A results ===
3 August 2025 Round 1	Glen Rovers	1-14 - 0-15	St Catherine's	Páirc Liosgcúl
	E Murphy 0-8.	Report	R Galvin 0-6, S O'Donoghue 0-2.

3 August 2025 Round 1	Meelin	3-12 - 1-32	St Finbarr's	Ballygiblin Grounds
	J McAuliffe 2-2, J Curtin 1-2, J Forrest 0-4, J O'Callaghan 0-2, Cormac Curtin 0-1, N Lenihan 0-1.	Report	C McCarthy 1-3, C O’Connor 0-6, C Keane 0-5, R Barrett 0-5, A Barry 0-4, J Lenihan 0-3, K O'Flynn 0-3, R Fitzpatrick 0-2, A Buckley 0-1.

16 August 2025 Round 2	St Catherine's	0-23 - 1-08	Meelin	Fr Con Buckley Park
	K Barry 0-9, O Fitzgerald 0-5, E Condon 0-2, B Mulcahy 0-2, S Cotter 0-2, G O'Brien 0-2, E Davis 0-1.	Report	N Linehan 1-3, J Curtin 0-2, J O'Callaghan 0-1, J Forrest 0-1, J McAuliffe 0-1.

16 August 2025 Round 2	St Finbarr's	1-18 - 2-15	Glen Rovers	Páirc Uí Chonaire
	C O’Connor 1-7, C McCarthy 0-3.	Report	S Busteed 2-2, E Murphy 0-6, M Dooley 0-4.

5 September 2025 Round 3	Glen Rovers	1-25 - 0-18	Meelin	O'Connell Park
	C Healy 0-7, E Murphy 0-7, N Goulding 0-5, G Kennefick 1-0, C O'Sullivan 0-3, S Busteed 0-1, G Mulcahy 0-1.	Report	N Lenihan 0-8, J Forrest 0-6, J Curtin 0-2, Cormac Curtin 0-1, Cian Curtin 0-1.

5 September 2025 Round 3	St Catherine's	0-19 - 0-15	St Finbarr's	Páirc Séamus de Barra
	R Galvin 0-6, K Barry 0-4, O Fitzgerald 0-2, S O’Donoghue 0-2.	Report	K O’Flynn 0-5, C O’Connor 0-3, D Murray 0-3.

== Group B ==
=== Group B table ===
Semi-finalist Quarter-finalist Relegation playoff

Team	Matches				Score			Pts
Team	Pld	W	D	L	For	Against	Diff	Pts
Kilbrittain	3	3	0	0	73	51	22	6
Cloughduv	3	2	0	1	77	52	25	4
Nemo Rangers	3	1	0	2	48	61	-23	2
Barryroe	3	0	0	3	44	68	-24	0

=== Group B results ===
1 August 2025 Round 1	Barryroe	1-15 - 0-22	Kilbrittain	Ahamilla Grounds
	O O'Donovan 1-6, R O'Donovan 0-3, T Ó Buachalla 0-2, D O'Sullivan 0-1, M Whelton 0-1, B O'Donovan 0-1, C Dineen 0-1.	Report	M Hickey 0-6, B Butler 0-4, J O’Donovan 0-4, L Griffin 0-2, C Hogan 0-2, R Crowley 0-2, C Sheehan 0-1, P Wall 0-1.

3 August 2025 Round 1	Cloughduv	3-20 - 0-17	Nemo Rangers	Páirc Dhónaill Uí Cheallacháin
	S O'Leary 1-6.	Report

16 August 2025 Round 2	Nemo Rangers	0-18 - 0-14	Barryroe	Páirc Liam Mhic Cárthaigh
	S Horgan 0-9, A Petrov 0-3, B Cripps 0-2, R Dalton 0-2, J Coogan 0-1, E Kelly 0-1.	Report	O O'Donovan 0-5, R O'Donovan 0-4, M Whelton 0-1, D Ó Buachalla 0-1, B O'Donovan 0-1, T Ó Buachalla 0-1, A McSweeney 0-1.

17 August 2025 Round 2	Kilbrittain	2-17 - 1-17	Cloughduv	Páirc Naomh Eoin
	M Hickey 0-6, B Butler 1-2, L Griffin 1-2, J O'Donovan 0-4, R Crowley 0-1, C Hogan 0-1, P Wall 0-1.	Report	A Twomey for 1-2, M Verling 0-4, M Walsh 0-2, A Murphy 0-2, A Elliott 0-1, A O'Leary 0-1, S O'Leary 0-1, E McNabola 0-1, E Clifford 0-1, M O'Leary 0-1.

5 September 2025 Round 3	Cloughduv	1-25 - 1-09	Barryroe	Páirc Uí Rinn
	B Verling 0-8 (0-4 f), M Verling 0-6 (0-4 f), A O’Leary 1-1, M Walsh, C O’Leary, A Twomey 0-2 each, O O’Driscoll, E McNabola, M O’Leary, A Murphy 0-1 each.	Report	O O’Donovan 1-2 (0-1 f), D Ó Buachalla 0-3, R O’Donovan, B O’Donovan, S O’Riordan (65), A McSweeney 0-1 each.

5 September 2025 Round 3	Nemo Rangers	1-10 - 3-19	Kilbrittain	Páirc Tadhg Mac Cárthaigh
	S Horgan 0-5, J Kearney 1-0, C Hogan 0-3, J Cogan 0-1, B O'Neill 0-1.	Report	C Hogan 2-2, P Wall 1-2, M Hickey 0-5, J O'Donovan 0-4, L Griffin 0-2, R Crowley 0-2, C Sheehan 0-1, C Ustianoski 0-1.

== Group C ==
=== Group C table ===
Quarter-finalist Relegation playoff

Team	Matches				Score			Pts
Team	Pld	W	D	L	For	Against	Diff	Pts
Ballygarvan	3	2	0	1	69	61	8	4
Argideen Rangers	3	2	0	1	64	63	1	4
Milford	3	1	0	2	63	72	-9	2
Tracton	3	1	0	2	57	57	0	2

=== Group C results ===
2 August 2025 Round 1	Ballygarvan	1-23 - 0-20	Milford	Mill Field
	C O'Regan 0-6, M Cussen 1-2, P O'Halloran 0-3, K Lyons 0-3, M Kennefick 0-2, S Fenton 0-2, S White 0-1, M O'Mahony 0-1, E O'Connor 0-1, D Mackey 0-1.	Report	E Dillon 0-6, C O'Gorman 0-4, S O'Connell 0-4, E Buckley 0-2, H O'Gorman 0-2, M O'Flynn 0-1, A Watson 0-1.

2 August 2025 Round 1	Argideen Rangers	0-18 - 1-13	Tracton	Charlie Hurley Park
	JM O'Callaghan 0-6, C Twomey 0-5, C O'Donovan 0-3, F Butler 0-2, F Walsh 0-1, D Holland 0-1.	Report	R Walsh 1-5, D O'Riordan 0-2, A Kiely 0-2, D O'Flaherty 0-2, M O'Sullivan 0-1, C Quinn 0-1.

16 August 2025 Round 2	Milford	2-15 - 1-23	Argideen Rangers	Ovens Grounds
	H O'Gorman 0-6, S O'Connell 1-1, T Curran 1-0, B Murphy 0-3, E Dillon 0-3, T O'Flynn 0-1, E Buckley 0-1.	Report	C Twomey 0-9, P Butler 1-1, JM O’Callaghan 0-4, F Walsh 0-2, James Crowley 0-2, M Lawton 0-1, S Walsh 0-1, S Henchion 0-1, S Maxwell 0-1, C O'Donovan 0-1.

17 August 2025 Round 2	Tracton	1-18 - 1-14	Ballygarvan	Ballymartle Grounds
	R Walsh 0-12 (9F), C Quinn 1-2,J Kingston 0-2, A Kiely, M Byrne (0-1 each).	Report	D Mackey 1-1 (1P), D O’Connor 0-4, K Lyons 0-3 M Cussen 0-2 (2F), M Kennifick, C O’Regan, S White, P O’ Halloran (0-1 each).

5 September 2025 Round 3	Ballygarvan	0-26 - 2-14	Argideen Rangers	Castle Grounds
	D O’Connor 0-10 (0-5 f), N Dowd 0-7, C O’Regan 0-3, R O’Halloran, M Kennefick, K Lyons 0-2 each.	Report	JM O’Callaghan 2-7 (1-0 pen, 0-3 f), C Twomey 0-4 (0-3 f), G Crowley, F Butler, P Butler 0-1 each.

5 September 2025 Round 3	Milford	2-16 - 0-20	Tracton	Mourneabbey Grounds
	H O'Gorman 0-8, B Murphy 1-1, E Dillon 0-4, T Curran 1-0, S O'Connell 0-2, A Watson 0-1.		R Walsh 0-13, D O'Riordan 0-2, D O'Flaherty 0-2, M Byrne 0-1, J Kingston 0-1, A Kiely 0-1.

== Relegation stage ==
=== Relegation playoff ===
21 September 2025 Playoff	Barryroe	1-21 - 0-11	Meelin	Blarney Grounds
	S Holland 1-3; O O’Donovan 0-5 (2f); B O’Donovan 0-4; R O’Donovan and T O’Buachalla 0-2 each; D O’Sullivan, C Dineen, J Murphy, C Madden and D O’Buachalla 0-1 each.	Report	J O’Callaghan 0-3; J Curtin (1f) and N Linehan (1f) 0-2 each; J Forrest, C Curtin, M O’Keeffe, and M Collins 0-1 each.

== Knockout stage ==
=== Bracket ===
Quarter-Finals
Ballygarvan (Carrigdhoun)	1–18
St Catherine's (Imokilly)	1–17
Cloughduv (Muskerry)	3–18
Argideen Rangers (Carbery)	1–14

Semi-Finals
Kilbrittain (Carbery)	1–17
Ballygarvan (Avondhu)	0–18
Glen Rovers (Seandún)	1–18
Cloughduv (Muskerry)	0–19

Final
Kilbrittain (Carbery)	0–22
Glen Rovers (Seandún)	2–15

=== Quarter-finals ===
20 September 2025 Quarter-final	Ballygarvan	1-18 - 1-17	St Catherine's	Páirc Tadhg Mac Cárthaigh
	K Lyons 1-2, D O'Connor 0-4 (0-3 f), M Cussen (f), P O'Halloran 0-3 each, R O'Halloran, N Dowd 0-2 each, M Kennifick, C O'Regan 0-1 each.	Report	R Galvin 0-8 (0-5 f), O Fitzgerald 0-5, D Mangan 1-0, S O'Donoghue 0-2, J Neville, R O'Connell, 0-1 each.

21 September 2025 Quarter-final	Cloughduv	3-18 - 1-14	Argideen Rangers	Páirc Liam Mhic Cárthaigh
	B Verling 3-2, M Verling 0-7 (0-5 f), S O’Leary 0-3, M Walsh 0-2, A Elliot, A O’Leary, A Twomey, M O’Leary (0-1 each).	Report	D Walsh 1-3, C Twomey 0-5 (0-3 f), J M O’Callaghan 0-4 (0-3f), M Lawton, J Crowley (0-1 each).

=== Semi-finals ===
3 October 2025 Semi-final	Glen Rovers	1-18 - 0-19	Cloughduv	Páirc Uí Rinn
	E Murphy 0-7 (0-1 f, 0-1 65), D Long 1-0, G Mulcahy, G Kennefick, C Healy 0-2 each, F O’Driscoll, S Busteed, D Coughlan, B Heffernan (f), D Tynan 0-1 each.	Report	M Verling 0-6 f, A Twomey, M Walsh, S O’Leary, B Verling 0-2 each, E Clifford, A Elliott, A O’Leary, O O’Driscoll, E McNabola 0-1 each.

4 October 2025 Semi-final	Kibrittain	1-17 - 0-18	Ballygarvan	Tracton Grounds
	M Hickey 0-12 (0-9 f), C Ustionowski 1-0, P Wall 0-2, J O'Donovan, R Crowley 0-1 each.	Report	D O'Connor 0-7 (0-3 f), D Mackey 0-3 f, S Fenton, K Lyons, R O'Halloran 0-2 each, N Dowd, C O'Regan 0-1 each.

=== Final ===
17 October 2025 Final	Glen Rovers	2-15 - 0-22	Kibrittain	SuperValu Páirc Uí Chaoimh
	G Mulcahy, E Murphy (f) 1-3 each, C Dorris 0-4, S Busteed, F O’Driscoll, C Healy, A O’Sullivan, D Tynan 0-1 each.	Report	M Hickey 0-9 (0-6 f), R Crowley 0-4 (0-1 f), P Wall 0-3, L Griffin, J O’Donovan 0-2 each, C Hogan, S Sexton 0-1 each.	Referee: K O'Sullivan (Valley Rovers)

== Championship statistics ==
=== Top scorers ===
Rank	Player	Club	Tally	Total	Matches	Average
1	Mark Hickey	Kilbrittain	0-38	38	5	7.60
2	Evan Murphy	Glen Rovers	1-31	34	5	6.80
3	Ronan Walsh	Tracton	1-30	33	3	11.00
4	Mark Verling	Cloughduv	0-28	28	5	5.60
5	J. M. O'Callaghan	Argideen Rangers	2-21	27	4	6.75
6	Shane Horgan	Nemo Rangers	0-26	26	3	8.66
7	Dylan O'Connor	Ballygarvan	0-25	25	5	5.00
8	Ólan O'Donovan	Barryroe	2-18	24	4	6.00
9	Charlie Twomey	Argideen Rangers	0-23	23	4	5.75
10	Brian Verling	Cloughduv	3-13	22	5	4.40
