= Robbie O'Flynn =

Irish hurler

Personal information
- Native name: Riobeard Ó Floinn (Irish)
- Born: 7 November 1997 (age 28) Glounthaune, County Cork, Ireland
- Height: 6 ft 1 in (185 cm)

Sport
- Sport: Hurling
- Position: Right wing-forward
Club*
Years	Club	Apps (scores)
2015-present	Erin's Own	38 (10-106)
Club titles
- Cork titles: 0
College
- Years: College
- University College Cork
College titles
- Fitzgibbon titles: 2
Inter-county**
Years	County	Apps (scores)
2017-present	Cork	12 (1-16)
Inter-county titles
- Munster titles: 3
- All-Irelands: 0
- NHL: 1
- All Stars: 0
- * club appearances and scores correct as of 20:55, 7 September 2025. **Inter County team apps and scores correct as of 21:52, 31 July 2021.

Robert O'Flynn (born 7 November 1997) is an Irish hurler who plays as a right corner-forward for club side Erin's Own and at inter-county level with the Cork senior hurling team.

== Playing career ==
=== Christian Brothers College ===
O'Flynn first came to prominence as a hurler with Christian Brothers College. Having played hurling in every grade during his time at the school, he usually lined out in the forwards on the senior team in the Harty Cup.

=== University College Cork ===
On 23 February 2019, O'Flynn was a substitute for University College Cork when they faced Mary Immaculate College in the Fitzgibbon Cup final. He was introduced in the 15th minute and claimed a winners' medal after the 2–21 to 0–13 victory.

O'Flynn played in a second successive Fitzgibbon Cup final on 12 February 2020. Lining out at right wing-forward, he ended the game with a second successive winners' medal after the 0–18 to 2–11 defeat of the Institute of Technology, Carlow.

=== Erin's Own ===
O'Flynn joined the Erin's Own club at a young age and played in all grades at juvenile and underage levels. In 2016 he won a county under-21 championship medal following a 3–24 to 1–16 defeat of Ballincollig. By this stage, O'Flynn had already made his senior hurling championship debut, coming on as a substitute in a 2–22 to 0–16 defeat of Carrigtwohill on 23 May 2015. After a successful 2016 championship campaign, O'Flynn lined out in his first senior final on 9 October 2016, however, Erin's Own suffered a 0–19 to 2–11 defeat by Glen Rovers.

=== Cork ===
==== Minor and under-21 ====
O'Flynn first played for Cork at minor level in 2015, however, his sole season in the grade ended without success with a defeat by Limerick. On 13 July 2017, O'Flynn made his first appearance for the Cork under-21 hurling team and scored a key goal in a one-point defeat of Waterford. On 4 July 2018, O'Flynn won a Munster medal after Cork's 2–23 to 1–13 defeat of Tipperary in the final. On 26 August 2018, he scored three points from play in Cork's 3–13 to 1-16 All-Ireland final defeat by Tipperary in what was his last game in the grade. O'Flynn was later nominated for the Team of the Year.

==== Senior ====
Following an impressive club championship campaign, O'Flynn was added to the Cork training panel in October 2016. He made his competitive debut on 15 January 2017 in a Munster League defeat of Limerick and later played against Clare in the National League. On 9 July 2017, O'Flynn won his first Munster medal as a non-playing substitute following a 1–25 to 1–20 defeat of Clare in the final.

O'Flynn missed most of the 2018 Munster Championship after suffering a concussion in Cork's opening round robin game against Clare. On 1 July 2018, he won a second successive Munster medal as a non-playing substitute following a 2–24 to 3–19 defeat of Clare in the final.

== Career statistics ==
=== Club ===
As of 26 September 2025.

Team	Year	Cork PSHC	
Team	Year	Apps	Score
Erin's Own	2015	5	0-03
Erin's Own	2016	5	0-07
Erin's Own	2017	4	2-09
Erin's Own	2018	2	1-03
Erin's Own	2019	1	0-01
Erin's Own	2020	5	2-13
Erin's Own	2021	4	2-13
Erin's Own	2022	4	1-25
Erin's Own	Total	30	8-74
Erin's Own	Year	Cork PJHC	
Erin's Own	Year	Apps	Score
Erin's Own	2023	2	0-02
Erin's Own	Total	2	0-02
Erin's Own	Year	Cork PSHC	
Erin's Own	Year	Apps	Score
Erin's Own	2024	3	0-13
Erin's Own	2025	5	5-30
Erin's Own	Total	8	5-43
Career total		40	13-119

=== Inter-county ===
As of 4 February 2023

Team	Year	National League			Munster		All-Ireland		Total	
Team	Year	Division	Apps	Score	Apps	Score	Apps	Score	Apps	Score
Cork	2017	Division 1A	1	0-00	0	0-00	0	0-00	1	0-00
Cork	2018	Division 1A	6	0-04	2	0-01	1	0-00	9	0-05
Cork	2019	Division 1A	2	0-01	2	0-01	2	1-04	6	1-06
Cork	2020	Division 1A	4	1-03	0	0-00	2	0-06	6	1-09
Cork	2021	Division 1A	4	1-04	1	0-01	4	0-05	9	1-10
Cork	2022	Division 1A	6	1-10	4	0-08	2	0-09	12	1-27
Cork	2023	Division 1A	1	1-01	0	0-00	0	0-00	1	1-01
Career total			24	4-23	9	0-11	11	1-24	44	5-58

== Honours ==
University College Cork

- Fitzgibbon Cup: 2019, 2020

Erin's Own

- Cork Premier Junior Hurling Championship: 2023
- Cork Under-21 A Hurling Championship: 2016

Cork

- Munster Senior Hurling Championship: 2017, 2018, 2025
- National Hurling League: 2025
- Munster Under-21 Hurling Championship: 2018
