= 2023 Cork Premier Junior Hurling Championship =

- Dates: 5 August – 14 October 2023
- Teams: 12
- Sponsor: Co-Op Superstores
- Champions: Erin's Own (1st title); James McMahon (captain); Tom Foley (captain); Brian O'Shea (manager)
- Runners-up: St Catherine's; Conor Hegarty (captain); Denis Walsh (manager)
- Relegated: Tracton

Tournament statistics
- Matches played: 24
- Goals scored: 54 (2.25 per match)
- Points scored: 775 (32.29 per match)
- Top scorer(s): Conor Dorris (0-39)

The 2023 Cork Premier Junior Hurling Championship was the second staging of the Cork Premier Junior Hurling Championship since its establishment by the Cork County Board in 2022. The draw for the group stage placings took place on 11 December 2022. The championship ran from 5 August to 14 October 2023.

The final was played on 14 October 2023 at Páirc Uí Chaoimh in Cork, between Erin's Own and St Catherine's, in what was their first ever meeting in the final. Erin's Own won the match by 1-14 to 2-09 to claim their first ever championship title.

Conor Dorris was the championship's top scorer with 0-39.

== Team changes ==
=== To Championship ===
Relegated from the Cork Intermediate A Hurling Championship

- Meelin

Promoted from the Cork Junior A Hurling Championship

- Erin's Own

=== From Championship ===
Promoted to the Cork Intermediate A Hurling Championship

- Ballygiblin

Relegated to the Mid Cork Junior A Hurling Championship

- Dripsey

== Group A ==
=== Group A table ===
Knockout stage Relegation playoff

Team	Matches				Score			Pts
Team	Pld	W	D	L	For	Against	Diff	Pts
Glen Rovers	3	2	0	1	57	52	5	4
Erin's Own	3	2	0	1	55	50	5	4
Argideen Rangers	3	2	0	1	57	53	4	4
Tracton	3	0	0	3	54	68	-14	0

=== Group A results ===
6 August 2023 Round 1	Tracton	0-19 - 0-24	Argideen Rangers	Páirc Uí Riagáin
	R Walsh 0-8, D Byrne 0-4, P O'Riordan 0-2, D O'Flaherty 0-1, D Kidney 0-1, C Quinn 0-1, J Kingston 0-1, J Good 0-1.		JM O'Callaghan 0-13, P Butler 0-4, D O'Donovan 0-1, C O'Donovan 0-1, B Foley 0-1, P Flynn 0-1, D Holland 0-1, M Lawton 0-1, F Butler 0-1.

6 August 2023 Round 1	Erin's Own	1-12 - 1-16	Glen Rovers	Ballincollig Grounds
	A Bowen 0-4, S Horgan 1-0.	Report	L Quilligan 1-4, C Dorris 0-6.

12 August 2023 Round 2	Glen Rovers	0-22 - 2-14	Tracton	Ballymah GAA Field
			R Walsh 0-10, P O'Riordan 1-1, D Byrne 1-0, J Kingston 0-1, D Kidney 0-1, D O'Flaherty 0-1.

12 August 2023 Round 2	Argideen Rangers	1-13 - 2-12	Erin's Own	Cloughduv Grounds
	JM O'Callaghan 0-8, F Butler 1-1, D O'Donovan 0-1, D Holland 0-1, C O'Donovan 0-1, P Butler 0-1.		A Bowen 1-5, A O'Sullivan 1-2, T Foley 0-3, G O'Mahony 0-1, J McMahon 0-1.	Referee: J McEvoy (Blarney)

1 September 2023 Round 3	Argideen Rangers	0-17 - 2-10	Glen Rovers	Ballincollig Grounds
	JM O’Callaghan 0-8 f, F Butler 0-3, P Butler 0-3, S Maxwell, C Lehane, A O’Flynn (0-1 each_.	Report	S Busteed 2-2, C Dorris 0-5 f, D Murphy 0-2 L Quilligan 0-1.	Referee: K O'Sullivan (Valley Rovers)

1 September 2023 Round 3	Tracton	0-15 - 1-19	Erin's Own	Páirc Uí Rinn
	R Walsh 0-10 f, D Byrne 0-2, J Good, D Harrington, M O’Sullivan 0-1 each.	Report	A Bowen 0-6 (0-5 f, 0-1 65), B Óg Murphy, A O’Sullivan 0-3 each, M Collins 1-0, C Coakley 0-2, T Foley, C McDonnell, S Murphy, G O’Mahony, J McMahon 0-1 each.	Referee: B Fahy (Brian Dillons)

== Group B ==
=== Group B table ===
Knockout stage

Team	Matches				Score			Pts
Team	Pld	W	D	L	For	Against	Diff	Pts
Barryroe	3	3	0	0	60	55	5	6
Kilbrittain	3	2	0	1	54	46	8	4
Ballygarvan	3	1	0	2	61	65	-4	2
Milford	3	0	0	3	52	60	-8	0

=== Group B results ===
5 August 2023 Round 1	Ballygarvan	1-21 - 2-19	Barryroe	Charlie Hurley Park
	N Dowd 1-5, M Kennefick 0-6, P O'Halloran 0-3, M Cussen 0-2, R O'Halloran 0-2, P Sheehan 0-1, K Lyons 0-1, C McIntyre 0-1.		O O'Donovan 1-8, R O'Donovan 0-5, A McSweeney 1-0, M Whelton 0-3, D Buckley 0-1, M Walsh 0-1, S Holland 0-1.

5 August 2023 Round 1	Kilbrittain	0-19 - 1-12	Milford	Banteer Sportsfield
	M Hickey 0-13, J O'Donovan 0-2, T Sheehan 0-1, P Wall 0-1, M Sexton 0-1, R Cashman 0-1.		H O'Gorman 1-5, E Dillon 0-4, B Murphy 0-2, T O'Flynn 0-1.

12 August 2023 Round 2	Barryroe	1-14 - 2-09	Kilbrittain	Ahamilla Complex
	O O'Donovan 1-5, D O'Driscoll 0-3, R O'Donovan 0-2, J Moloney 0-1, D Ó Buachalla 0-1, R Kilbane 0-1, R Kiely 0-1.		P Wall 1-0, C Hogan 1-0, R Cashman 0-3, C Ustianowski 0-2, M Hickey 0-2, J O'Donovan 0-1, R Crowley 0-1.	Referee: D Kirwan (Éire Óg)

12 August 2023 Round 2	Milford	2-15 - 1-20	Ballygarvan	Grenagh Grounds
		Report	M Cussen 0-12, P O'Halloran 1-2.

1 September 2023 Round 3	Kilbrittain	1-17 - 0-14	Ballygarvan	Brinny Sportsfield
	M Hickey 0-9f, C Ustianowski 1-2, P Wall, J O’Donovan 0-2 each, M Sexton, S Sexton 0-1 each.	Report	M Cussen 0-6f, P O’Halloran, D O’Connor 0-2 each, R O’Halloran, P Sheehan, M Kennefick, M O’Mahony 0-1 each.	Referee: I McCarthy (Bandon)

1 September 2023 Round 3	Milford	1-13 - 2-12	Barryroe	Coachford Sportsfield
	H O’Gorman 0-9 (0-8 f), B Murphy 1-0, T O’Flynn 0-2, E Dillon (f), A Watson 0-1 each.	Report	O O’Donovan 2-5 (0-5 f), M Whelton 0-5 f, R O’Donovan 0-2.	Referee: J Ryan (Macroom)

== Group C ==
=== Group C table ===
Knockout stage Relegation playoff

Team	Matches				Score			Pts
Team	Pld	W	D	L	For	Against	Diff	Pts
St. Catherine's	3	2	1	0	68	58	10	5
Meelin	3	2	1	0	69	64	5	5
Russell Rovers	2	1	0	1	45	32	13	2
St. Finbarr's	3	0	0	3	48	75	-27	0

=== Group C results ===
6 August 2023 Round 1	Meelin	2-15 - 0-19	Russell Rovers	Castletownroche Grounds
	N Linehan 0-7, M McAuliffe 1-1, J Curtin 1-1, W Murphy 0-2, J Forrest 0-2, J McAuliffe 0-1.		B Hartnett 0-11, M Dwyer 0-3, L Duggan-Murray 0-2, C Sheehan 0-1, K Moynihan 0-1, J McGrath 0-1, J Kennefick 0-1.

6 August 2023 Round 1	St Finbarr's	1-12 - 2-18	St Catherine's	Páirc Uí Chonaill
	C Keane 0-8, J Linehan 1-1, J Barrett 0-2, A Buckley 0-1.		D Mangan 1-2, R Galvin 0-4, E Davis 0-4, W Leamy 1-0, K Wallace 0-3, S O'Donoghue 0-3, M Mulcahy 0-1, B Mulcahy 0-1.

12 August 2023 Round 2	St Catherine's	3-14 - 1-20	Meelin	Kildorrery Grounds
	S O'Donoghue 1-4, K Barry 1-1, K Wallace 1-0, D Mangan 0-2, R Galvin 0-2, E Davis 0-2, W Leamy 0-1, C Hegarty 0-1, B Mulcahy 0-1.		N Linehan 0-9, J Curtin 0-4, J O'Callaghan 1-0, J Forrest 0-3, S Hehir 0-1, J McAuliffe 0-1, C Curtin 0-1, S Curtin 0-1.

13 August 2023 Round 2	Russell Rovers	3-17 - 0-11	St Finbarr's	Páirc Uí Chonaill

1 September 2023 Round 3	Russell Rovers	1-17 - 0-21	St Catherine's	Rostellan Grounds
	B Hartnett 0-6 (0-5 f), J Kennefick 1-0, L Duggan Murray 0-3 (0-1 f), K Moynihan, R Cummins, K Roche (f) 0-2 each, M Dwyer, J Beausang 0-1 each.	Report	S O’Donoghue 0-10 (0-8 f), D Mangan 0-4, B Mulcahy 0-3, K O’Donoghue, E Davis (f), K Wallace, K Barry 0-1 each.	Referee: P Beausang (Midleton)

1 September 2023 Round 3	Meelin	3-16 - 1-19	St Finbarr's	Páirc Uí Shíocháin
	N Linehan 0-8, J O'Callaghan 0-6, J Curtin 1-1, M McAuliffe 1-1, Ciarán Curtin 1-0.		C Keane 0-10, A Buckley 0-4, D Murray 1-1, K O'Flynn 0-2, J O'Kelly 0-1, R O'Sullivan 0-1.

== Knockout stage ==
=== Bracket ===
Quarter-Finals
Erin's Own (Imokilly)	3-14
Meelin (Duhallow)	0-16
Glen Rovers (Seandun)	1-21
Kilbrittain (Carbery)	0-24

Semi-Finals
Barryroe (Carbery)	2-08
Erin's Own (Imokilly)	2-13
St Catherine's (Imokilly)	2-11
Glen Rovers (Seandun)	0-13

Final
Erin's Own (Imokilly)	1-14
St Catherine's (Imokilly)	2-09

=== Relegation playoff ===
17 September 2023 Playoff	Tracton	0-14 - 0-17	St Finbarr's	Páirc Liam Mhic Cárthaigh
	R Walsh 0-7 f, D Harrington 0-2, M O’Sullivan, K Webb, G Webb, P O’Riordan, D O’Flaherty 0-1 each.	Report	C Keane 0-10 (0-9 f, 0-1 65), J Lenihan, C Steele 0-2 each, J O’Kelly, D Murray, K O’Flynn 0-1 each.	Referee: D Daly (Brian Dillons)

=== Quarter-finals ===
16 September 2023 Quarter-final	Meelin	0-16 - 3-14	Erin's Own	Mallow GAA Complex
	N Linehan 0-7 f, J O’Callaghan 0-6, J McAuliffe 0-2, M McAuliffe 0-1.	Report	A Bowen 1-6 (0-3 f), A O’Sullivan 1-2, T Foley 1-0, J Kavanagh, S Murphy 0-2 each, M Collins, C Dunphy 0-1 each.	Referee: A Hyland (Kilworth)

17 September 2023 Quarter-final	Glen Rovers	1-21 - 0-24; Penalties: 3-0	Kilbrittain	Éire Óg Grounds
	C Dorris 0-13 (0-12 f), S Busteed 1-2, L Quilligan, R Dunne (0-1 f) 0-2 each, B Heffernan (f), C O’Sullivan 0-1 each.	Report	M Hickey 0-12 (0-11 f), P Wall, C Ustianowski, M Sexton 0-3 each, R Cashman (0-1 f), J O’Donovan, B Butler 0-1 each.	Referee: K O'Sullivan (Valley Rovers)

=== Semi-finals ===
29 September 2023 Semi-final	St Catherine's	2-11 - 0-13	Glen Rovers	Riverstown Sportsfield
	S O’Donoghue (0-6, 1f), K Barry and E Condon (1-0 each), S Cotter (0-3, 1f), K O’Donoghue and R Galvin (0-1 each).	Report	C Dorris (0-7, 5f), B Heffernan (0-2, 2f), L Quilligan (0-2), R Dunne and S Busteed (0-1 each).	Referee: M O'Mahony

30 September 2023 Semi-final	Barryroe	2-08 - 2-13	Erin's Own	Páirc Uí Rinn
	O O’Donovan (0-4, 1f), R O’Donovan (1-1), D Buckley (1-0), M Whelton (0-2), D O’Donovan (0-1).	Report	A O’Sullivan (1-3), J McMahon (1-1), A Bowen (0-4, 2f), T Foley (0-3), S Murphy (0-2).	Referee: C Egan (Glen Rovers)

=== Final ===
14 October 2023 Final	St Catherine's	2-09 - 1-14	Erin's Own	Páirc Uí Chaoimh
	D Mangan, S Cotter 1-0, S O’Donoghue 0-3 (0-2 f), E Davis (0-1 f), B Mulcahy 0-2, O Fitzgerald, K Barry 0-1 each.	Report	A Bowen 0-4 (0-1 f, 0-1 65), J Kavanagh 1-1, J McMahon 0-3, A O’Sullivan, R O’Flynn 0-2 each, T Foley, M Collins 0-1 each.	Referee: A Hyland (Kilworth)

== Championship statistics ==
=== Top scorers ===
Overall

Rank	Player	Club	Tally	Total	Matches	Average
1	Conor Dorris	Glen Rovers	0-39	39	5	7.80
2	Mark Hickey	Kilbrittain	0-36	36	4	9.00
3	Alan Bowen	Erin's Own	2-29	35	6	5.83
3	Ronan Walsh	Tracton	0-35	35	4	8.75
5	Olan O'Donovan	Barryroe	4-22	34	4	8.50
