= 2010 Cork Intermediate Hurling Championship =

Championship

- Dates: 1 May 2010 – 24 October 2010
- Teams: 16
- Sponsor: Evening Echo
- Champions: Kilbrittain (2nd title); Alan Hayes (captain); Peter Brennan (manager)
- Runners-up: Ballygarvan
- Relegated: St. Vincent's

Tournament statistics
- Matches played: 29
- Goals scored: 78 (2.69 per match)
- Points scored: 817 (28.17 per match)
- Top scorer(s): Adrian Mannix (1-57)

The 2010 Cork Intermediate Hurling Championship was the 101st staging of the Cork Intermediate Hurling Championship since its establishment by the Cork County Board in 1909. The draw for the opening round fixtures took place on 13 December 2009. The championship began on 1 May 2010 and ended on 24 October 2010.

On 24 October 2010, Kilbrittain won the championship after a 1–12 to 0–11 defeat of Ballygarvan in the final. This was their second championship title overall and their first title since 1995.

Kilworth's Adrian Mannix was the championship's top scorer with 1-57.

== Team changes ==
=== To Championship ===
Promoted from the Cork Junior A Hurling Championship

- Fermoy

Relegated from the Cork Premier Intermediate Hurling Championship

- St. Catherine's

=== From Championship ===
Promoted to the Cork Premier Intermediate Hurling Championship

- Valley Rovers

Relegated to the City Junior A Hurling Championship

- Delanys

== Format change ==
Between 2000 and 2009, teams were only permitted two defeats before exiting the championship proper. As of 2010, all teams were guaranteed a third chance to remain in the championship via a restructuring of the relegation playoffs.

== Results ==
=== First round ===
1 May 2010 First round	St. Catherine's	1-13 - 2-11	Blackrock	Rathcormac
	K Dineen 1-7, S Kearney 0-2, P Roche 0-2, N O'Brien 0-1, S Fitzgerald 0-1.		A Long 1-0, M O'Donoghue 1-0, B Hennebry 0-2, M Russell 0-2, D Gosnell 0-2, B Cashman 0-2, M Dummond 0-1, D O'Shea 0-1, P Bennett 0-1.

4 June 2010 First round	Kilbrittain	2-15 - 2-09	Dromina	Coachford Sportsfield
	D Desmond 1-5, T Harrington 1-3, R Cashman 0-4, J Wall 0-3.		A O'Shaughnessy 0-5, P Hayes 1-2, P Gould 1-1, J Hamilton 0-1.

5 June 2010 First round	Dripsey	1-20 - 1-09	Barryroe	Brinny Sportsfield
	D O'Riordan 0-12, D O'Sullivan 1-4, M O'Sullivan 0-2, G Murphy 0-1, A Murray 0-1.		J O'Donovan 1-0, K Griffin 0-3, P Collins 0-2, D Harrington 0-2, J Fleming 0-1, K McCarthy 0-1.

18 June 2010 First round	Cobh	3-10 - 2-14	Ballygarvan	Shanbally
	B Aherne 2-1, T McGrath 1-0, E Wilson 0-3, S Ryan 0-2, L Greaney 0-2, A McCarthy 0-1, W Drake 0-1.		M Kennefick 0-9, K Ashman 1-0, T Quilligan 1-0, G White 0-2, M O'Riordan 0-2, J Spillane 0-1.

18 June 2010 First round	Aghada	0-20 - 3-13 (aet)	Bandon	Ovens
	T O'Keeffe 0-8, M Galvin 0-3, J Connolly 0-2, C Fleming 0-2, P O'Neill 0-2, P Wall 0-1, A Creedon 0-1, S O'Keeffe 0-1.		R Payne 2-1, D Crowley 0-6, R Crowley 0-4, J Hickey 1-0, J McCarthy 0-1, M Sugrue 0-1.

19 June 2010 First round	Kilworth	1-14 - 2-13	Éire Óg	Páirc Uí Rinn
	P Lynch 1-6, A Mannix 0-6, D McNamara 0-1, B Tobin 0-1.		C Sheehan 1-8, M Long 1-0, J Dineen 0-2, J Crowley 0-1, V Fahy 0-1, K Hallissey 0-1.

24 June 2010 First round	Milford	0-22 - 0-24 (aet)	Kanturk	Fr. Con Buckley Park
	S O'Connell 0-8, A Watson 0-5, E Dillon 0-5, P Kirwan 0-1, J Cremin 0-1, M O'Connell 0-1, P O'Regan 0-1.		L McLoughlin 0-11, A Walsh 0-4, J Healy 0-2, A Nash 0-2, B Mullane 0-1, L O'Neill 0-1, N Aherne 0-1, M O'Riordan 0-1, J O'Connell 0-1.

27 June 2010 First round	Fermoy	0-15 - 0-08	St. Vincent's	Felix Sarsfield Memorial Park
	B O'Sullivan 0-6, P Shanahan 0-3, M Flynn 0-2, K Morrison 0-2, T Grumbridge 0-1, R O'Callaghan 0-1.		D Collins 0-4, D Murphy 0-2, C Barry 0-1, S Rodgers 0-1.

=== Second round ===
27 June 2010 Second round	Barryroe	2-15 - 0-16	Kilworth	Coachford Sportsfield
	K Griffin 0-9, J O'Donovan 1-4, C Hurley 1-0, P Collins 0-2.		A Mannix 0-9, D McNamara 0-3, L Whelan 0-1, M O'Connor 0-1, N Byrne 0-1, A O'Hara 0-1.

27 June 2010 Second round	Cobh	3-14 - 2-16	St. Catherine's	Páirc Uí Rinn
	B Ahern 0-6, L Greaney 1-2, S Hourihan 1-2, T McGrath 1-0, W Drake 0-2, E Wilson 0-1, R O'Connell 0-1.		K Dineen 1-13, K Morrisson 1-3.

27 June 2010 Second round	Milford	1-08 - 2-06	Dromina	Fr.Kelleher Park
	E Dillon 1-4, S O'Connell 0-2, H O'Gorman 0-1, T O'Flynn 0-1.		R Morrissey 1-0, J Jordan 1-0, A O'Shaughnessy 0-3, J Hamilton 0-2, L Hayes 0-1.

2 July 2010 Second round	Aghada	1-19 - 0-08	St. Vincent's	Páirc Shéamuis de Barra
	T O'Keeffe 0-11, P O'Neill 1-1, M Galvin 0-3, A Cotter 0-2, J Connolly 0-1, G Melvin 0-1.		C Barry 0-4, D Collins 0-2, JP Murphy 0-1, S Rodgers 0-1.

=== Third round ===
4 July 2010 Third round	St. Catherine's	1-08 - 1-15	Kilworth	Castlelyons
	K Dineen 0-4, B Mulcahy 1-0, S Kearey 0-2, K Morrisson 0-1, L O'Connor 0-1.		A Mannix 0-10, L Whelan 1-2, B Tobin 0-1, A O'Hara 0-1, W Condon 0-1.

19 July 2010 Third round	Milford	1-24 - 2-11	St. Vincent's	Mallow GAA Complex
	S O'Connell 0-11, E Dillon 0-7, J Cronin 1-1, M O'Connell 0-1, A Watson 0-1, T O'Flynn 0-1, P Kirwan 0-1, H O'Gorman 0-1.		C Barry 1-8, JP Murphy 1-1, D Collins 0-1, T O'Connell 0-1.

=== Relegation playoff ===
2 August 2010 Relegation playoff	St. Catherine's	2-19 - 2-09	St. Vincent's	Castletownroche
	K Dineen 1-7, P Roche 1-2, K Morrisson 0-3, S Cotter 0-3, S Kearney 0-2, S Fitzgerald 0-1, A Keane 0-1.		C Barry 2-9.

=== Fourth round ===
29 July 2010 Fourth round	Dripsey	2-17 - 0-14	Cobh	Páirc Uí Rinn
	D O'Riordan 1-8, D O'Sullivan 1-1, A Murray 0-2, J Buckley 0-2, J Carey 0-1, S Murray 0-1, G Murphy 0-1, D Buckley 0-1.		B Aherne 0-4, L Greaney 0-3, E Wilson 0-2, A Stack 0-1, A Walley 0-1, S Hourihane 0-1, A McCarthy 0-1, D Barrett 0-1.

31 July 2010 Fourth round	Milford	2-12 - 0-19	Kilworth	Mill Field
	A Watson 1-2, S O'Connell 0-5, J Cremin 1-0, M O'Connell 0-2, E Dillon 0-1, P Kirwan 0-1, H O'Gorman 0-1.		A Mannix 0-12, P Lynch 0-3, L Whelan 0-1, M O'Connor 0-1, D Cahill 0-1, J Cahill 0-1.

31 July 2010 Fourth round	Barryroe	1-18 - 0-10	Blackrock	Cloughduv
	K Griffin 0-10, T Harrington 1-1, C Hurley 0-2, J O'Donovan 0-2, P Collins 0-1, C Cahalane 0-1, D Harrington 0-1.		K O'Keeffe 0-6, B Cashman 0-2, B Hennebry 0-2.

3 August 2010 Fourth round	Éire Óg	0-17 - 1-18	Ballygarvan	Brinny Sportsfield
	J Dineen 0-10, K Hallissey 0-6, A O'Mahony 0-1.		M Kennefick 0-8, K Ashman 1-0, G White 0-3, D O'Sullivan 0-2, T Quilligan 0-2, M O'Riordan 0-1, A Corcoran 0-1, E Aherne 0-1.

4 August 2010 Fourth round	Aghada	3-11 - 2-10	Fermoy	Youghal
	T O'Keeffe 2-7, P O'Neill 1-1, G Melvin 0-2, C Fleming 0-1.		B O'Sullivan 0-7, J Hutchings 1-0, P Shanahan 1-0, S Kileen 0-1, M Flynn 0-1, R O'Callaghan 0-1.

9 August 2010 Fourth round	Bandon	3-18 - 1-10	Kanturk	Coachford Sportsfield
	R Crowley 1-3, D Crowley 0-5, J McCarthy 1-1, J Hickey 0-4, M Sugrue 1-0, J O'Donovan 0-2, G O'Riordan 0-1, D O'Donoghue 0-1, J Harrington 0-1.		L McLoughlin 0-6, A Nash 1-0, A Walsh 0-1, D Duane 0-1, J McLoughlin 0-1, J Healy 0-1.

- Dromina and Kilbrittain received byes in this round.

=== Quarter-finals ===
7 August 2010 Quarter-final	Dromina	1-12 - 1-17	Kilbrittain	Coachford Sportsfield
	A O'Shaughnessy 0-7, P Hayes 1-0, J Finn 0-3, J Delee 0-1, J Hayes 0-1.		M Sexton 0-7, J Wall 1-3, A Hayes 0-3, V O'Brien 0-1, T Harrington 0-1, David Desmond 0-1, R Cashman 0-1.

13 August 2010 Quarter-final	Barryroe	2-14 - 1-10	Dripsey	Páirc Naomh Eoin
	K Griffin 1-5, P Collins 1-1, C Hurley 0-2, D Harrington 0-2, J O'Donovan 0-2, T Harrington 0-1, A Fleming 0-1.		G Murphy 1-1, D O'Riordan 0-4, P O'Riordan 0-2, D Buckley 0-1, D O'Sullivan 0-1, S Burke 0-1.

31 August 2010 Quarter-final	Bandon	3-11 - 3-14	Ballygarvan	Brinny Sportsfield
	D O'Donoghue 2-0, D Crowley 0-5, J McCarthy 1-1, R Payne 0-2, J Harrington 0-2, G O'Riordan 0-1.		T Quilligan 2-2, M Kennefick 0-7, E Ahern 1-1, S White 0-3, K Ashman 0-1.

25 September 2010 Quarter-final	Aghada	2-13 - 1-17	Kilworth	Watergrasshill
	T O'Keeffe 1-7, M Galvin 1-1, J Connolly 0-2, S Wall 0-1, S O'Keeffe 0-1, C Fleming 0-1.		A Mannix 1-9, P Lynch 0-5, L Whelan 0-2, N McNamara 0-1.

=== Semi-finals ===
25 September 2010 Semi-final	Ballygarvan	2-15 - 3-12	Barryroe	Páirc Uí Rinn
	M Kennefick 0-10, T Quilligan 1-1, J Spillane 1-0, G White 0-2, M O'Riordan 0-1, K Ashman 0-1.		K Griffin 0-5, C Hurley 1-1, J O'Donovan 1-1, T Harrington 0-4, G Holland 1-0, P Collins 0-1.

2 October 2010 Semi-final replay	Ballygarvan	3-20 - 1-14	Barryroe	Páirc Uí Rinn
	M Kennefick 0-9, T Quilligan 2-2, G White 1-0, D O'Sullivan 0-2, K Ashman 0-2, D Bouse 0-2, Derry O'Sullivan 0-1, M O'Riordan 0-1, S White 0-1.		K Griffin 0-7, C Hurley 1-2, P Collins 0-3, D Harrington 0-1, J O'Donovan 0-1.

3 October 2010 Semi-final	Kilbrittain	0-17 - 0-16	Kilworth	Páirc Uí Chaoimh
	M Sexton 0-6, J Wall 0-5, R Cashman 0-5, O Sexton 0-1.		A Mannix 0-11, P Lynch 0-2, D McNamara 0-1, M O'Connor 0-1, J Cahill 0-1,

=== Final ===
24 October 2010 Final	Kilbrittain	1-12 - 0-11	Ballygarvan	Páirc Uí Chaoimh
	J Wall 1-2, M Sexton 0-4, R Cashman 0-3, D Desmond 0-1, J Deasy 0-1, A Hayes 0-1.		M Kennefick 0-7, S White 0-2, G White 0-1, J Spillane 0-1.	Referee: J Sexton (Ballyhea)

== Championship statistics ==
=== Top scorers ===
Overall

Rank	Player	Club	Tally	Total	Matches	Average
1	Adrian Mannix	Kilworth	1-57	60	6	10.00
2	Mark Kennefick	Ballygarvan	0-50	50	6	8.33
3	Trevor O'Keeffe	Aghada	3-33	42	4	10.50
3	Kieran Griffin	Barryroe	1-39	42	6	7.00
4	Kevin Dineen	St. Catherine's	3-31	40	4	10.00
5	Cian Barry	St. Vincent's	3-22	31	4	7.75
6	Diarmuid O'Riordan	Dripsey	1-24	27	3	9.00
6	Jamie Wall	Kilbrittain	3-18	27	5	5.4
8	Seánie O'Connell	Milford	0-26	26	4	6.50
9	Tadhg Quilligan	Ballygarvan	6-07	25	6	4.16
10	Eoin Dillon	Milford	1-17	20	4	5.00

In a single game

Rank	Player	Club	Tally	Total	Opposition
1	Kevin Dineen	St. Catherine's	1-13	16	Cobh
2	Cian Barry	St. Vincent's	2-09	15	St. Catherine's
3	Trevor O'Keeffe	Aghada	2-07	13	Fermoy
4	Adrian Mannix	Kilworth	1-09	12	Aghada
4	Diarmuid O'Riordan	Dripsey	0-12	12	Barryroe
4	Adrian Mannix	Kilworth	0-12	12	Milford
5	Ciarán Sheehan	Éire Óg	1-08	11	Kilworth
5	Cian Barry	St. Vincent's	1-08	11	Milford
5	Diarmuid O'Riordan	Dripsey	1-08	11	Cobh
5	Lorcán McLoughlin	Kanturk	0-11	11	Milford
5	Trevor O'Keeffe	Aghada	0-11	11	St. Vincent's
5	Seánie O'Connell	Milford	0-11	11	St. Vincent's
5	Adrian Mannix	Kilworth	0-11	11	Kilbrittain
