= Johnny Sheehan =

Irish hurler

Personal information
- Native name: Seán Ó Síocháin (Irish)
- Born: 1975 (age 50–51) Ballynoe, County Cork, Ireland
- Height: 5 ft 11 in (180 cm)

Sport
- Sport: Hurling
- Position: Midfield
Club
- Years: Club
- St Catherine's
Club titles
- Cork titles: 0
Inter-county*
Years	County	Apps (scores)
1997-2000	Cork	2 (0-00)
Inter-county titles
- Munster titles: 1
- All-Irelands: 1
- NHL: 0
- All Stars: 0
- *Inter County team apps and scores correct as of 01:51, 5 August 2014.

Johnny Sheehan (born 1975) is an Irish former hurler who played for East Cork club St Catherine's. He played for the Cork senior hurling team for two seasons, during which time he usually lined out at midfield.

Sheehan began his hurling career at club level with St Catherine's. After beginning his career at juvenile and underage levels, he eventually broke onto the club's top adult team and experienced his first success in 1994 when the club won the Cork Intermediate Championship title. He later won a Cork Premier Intermediate Championship title in 2004 and promotion to the top flight of Cork hurling.

At inter-county level, Sheehan was part of the Cork under-21 team that won the Munster Championship in 1996. He joined the Cork senior team in 1997. From his debut, Sheehan was better known as a panellist rather than a member of the starting fifteen and made a number of National League and Championship appearances in a career that ended in 2000. During that time he was part of Cork's All-Ireland Championship-winning team in 1999. Sheehan also secured two Munster Championship medals.

== Honours ==
St Colmans Harty Cup x 2 All Ireland x 1

St Catherine's

- Cork Premier Intermediate Hurling Championship (1): 2004
- Cork Intermediate Hurling Championship (1): 1994

Cork

- All-Ireland Senior Hurling Championship (1): 1999
- Munster Senior Hurling Championship (2): 1999, 2000
- Munster Under-21 Hurling Championship (1): 1996
