= Cathal Casey =

Irish hurler (born 1967)

Personal information
- Native name: Cathal Ó Cathasaigh (Irish)
- Born: 4 September 1967 (age 59) Ballynoe, County Cork, Ireland
- Occupation: Managing director
- Height: 6 ft 0 in (183 cm)

Sport
- Sport: Hurling
- Position: Left wing-back
Club
- Years: Club
- St Catherine’s
College
- Years: College
- 1986-1991: University College Cork
College titles
- Fitzgibbon titles: 4
Inter-county*
Years	County	Apps (scores)
1986-1995	Cork	14 (0-15)
Inter-county titles
- Munster titles: 2
- All-Irelands: 1
- NHL: 1
- All Stars: 1
- *Inter County team apps and scores correct as of 19:05, 29 July 2015.

Cathal Casey (born 4 September 1967) is an Irish former hurler who played as a right wing-back for the Cork senior team.

Born in Ballynoe, County Cork, Casey first arrived on the inter-county scene at the age of seventeen when he first linked up with the Cork minor team before later joining the under-21 side. He joined the senior panel during the 1986 championship. Casey subsequently became a regular member of the starting fifteen and won one All-Ireland medal, two Munster medal and one National Hurling League medal. He was an All-Ireland runner-up on one occasion.

As a member of the Munster inter-provincial team on a number of occasions, Casey won one Railway Cup medal as a non-playing substitute. At club level he is a one-time championship medallist in the intermediate grade with St Catherine's.

Throughout his career Casey made 14 championship appearances. His retirement came following the conclusion of the 1995 championship.

In retirement from playing Casey became involved in team management and coaching. He has served as a selector with the Cork and Warwickshire senior teams while he has also been involved with University College Cork.

== Playing career ==
=== University ===
During his studies at University College Cork, Casey was an automatic inclusion on the college hurling team. In 1987 he was at midfield as UCC faced University College Dublin in the inter-varsities decider. A 1-11 to 0-11 victory gave Casey his first Fitzgibbon Cup medal.

Casey was at midfield once again in 1988 as UCC were bidding for an eighth successive Fitzgibbon Cup title. University College Galway provided the opposition, however, a comfortable 1-14 to 1-3 victory gave Casey a second successive winners' medal.

Nine-in-a-row proved beyond UCC, however, the team reached yet another decider in 1990. A 3-10 to 0-12 defeat of Waterford Regional Technical College gave Casey a third Fitzgibbon Cup medal.

Casey won a fourth Fitzgibbon Cup winners' medal in five years in 1991 as University College Cork were accounted for by 1-14 to 1-6.

=== Club ===
Casey was still eligible for the minor grade when he experienced his first major success in 1984. Defeats of Cobh and St Ita's in the respective football and hurling deciders, secured a set of junior b championship medals.

A knee injury ruled Casey out of St Catherine's successful intermediate championship campaign in 1994, however, a decade later he was still a key member of the starting fifteen. St Catherine's faced Courcey Rovers in the premier intermediate decider that year. Courceys went into the game favourites following a number of impressive victories in earlier rounds, however, a goal by Casey just before the interval secured a 1-11 to 1-8 victory.

=== Inter-county ===
Casey first played for Cork as a member of the minor hurling team on 15 May 1985 in a 1-12 to 1-8 Munster semi-final defeat of Limerick. He later won a Munster medal following a 1-13 to 1-8 defeat of Tipperary in the decider. Wexford provided the opposition in the subsequent All-Ireland decider on 1 September 1985. Casey scored a point from wing-back to secure an All-Ireland Minor Hurling Championship medal in Cork's 3-10 to 0-12 victory.

Three years later Casey was at right wing-back on the Cork under-21 team. He won a Munster medal that year following a 4-12 to 1-7 defeat of Limerick. Cork subsequently faced Kilkenny in the All-Ireland decider on 11 September 1988. Played in St. Brendan's Park, Birr to commemorate the centenary of the very first senior All-Ireland final being played there, Cork triumphed by 4-12 to 1-5, with Casey winning an All-Ireland Under-21 Hurling Championship medal.

Casey was a member of the extended panel as Cork faced Galway in the All-Ireland decider on 7 September 1986. The men from the west were the red-hot favourites against a Cork team in decline, however, on the day a different story unfolded. Four Cork goals, one from John Fenton, two from Tomás Mulcahy and one from Kevin Hennessy, stymied the Galway attack and helped the Rebels to a 4–13 to 2–15 victory.

In November 1986 Casey made his senior debut in a National Hurling League game against Galway. He was later included on Cork's championship panel but didn't make his debut until 18 June 1989 in a 5-16 to 4-17 Munster semi-final replay defeat by Waterford.

In 1990 Cork bounced back after a period in decline. Casey won a Munster medal that year following a 4-16 to 2-14 defeat of Tipperary. The subsequent All-Ireland final on 2 September 1990 pitted Cork against Galway for the second time in four years. Galway were once again the red-hot favourites and justified this tag by going seven points ahead in the opening thirty-five minutes thanks to a masterful display by Joe Cooney. Cork fought back with an equally expert display by captain Tomás Mulcahy. The game was effectively decided on an incident which occurred midway through the second half when Cork goalkeeper Ger Cunningham blocked a point-blank shot from Martin Naughton with his nose. The umpires gave no 65-metre free, even though he clearly deflected it out wide. Cork went on to win a high-scoring and open game of hurling by 5–15 to 2–21. It was a third All-Ireland medal for O'Sullivan. He finished off the year by winning a fourth All-Star before being named Texaco Hurler of the Year.

Cork surrendered their titles in 1991, however, Casey claimed an All-Star award for his performances.

Casey claimed his second Munster medal in 1992 following a 1-22 to 3-11 of Limerick. On 6 September 1992 Cork faced Kilkenny in the All-Ireland decider. At half-time Cork were two points ahead, however, two second-half goals by John Power and Michael Phelan supplemented a first-half D. J. Carey penalty which gave Kilkenny a 3-10 to 1-12 victory.

In 1993 Casey won a National Hurling League medal following a 3-11 to 1-12 defeat of Wexford.

Cork's hurling fortunes took a downturn over the next few years and Casey retired from inter-county hurling following Cork's exit from the 1995 championship.

=== Inter-provincial ===
Casey was first chosen on the Munster inter-provincial team in 1991, however, the southern province lost out to Connacht by 1-13 to 0-12 in the decider.

In 1992 Munster made it back to the decider where they faced Ulster. Casey remained on the bench as Munster secured a narrow 3-6 to 1-11 victory and a Railway Cup medal.

== Coaching career ==
In December 2006 Casey joined the Cork senior hurling backroom team as a selector under Gerald McCarthy. Cork's season ended with an All-Ireland quarter-final replay defeat by Waterford. Casey stepped down as a selector at the end of the season.

Casey later served on the management team with the Warwickshire senior team.

== Honours ==
=== Player ===
St Catherine's

- Cork Premier Intermediate Hurling Championship (1): 2004

Cork

- All-Ireland Senior Hurling Championship (2): 1986 (sub), 1990
- Munster Senior Hurling Championship (2): 1990, 1992
- National Hurling League (1): 1992-93
- All-Ireland Under-21 Hurling Championship (1): 1988
- Munster Under-21 Hurling Championship (1): 1988
- All-Ireland Minor Hurling Championship (1): 1985
- Munster Minor Hurling Championship (1): 1985

Munster

- Railway Cup (1): 1992 (sub)

=== Individual ===
Honours

- All-Star (1): 1991
