= 2022 Cork Premier Junior Hurling Championship =

- Dates: 29 July – 15 October 2022
- Teams: 12
- Sponsor: Co-Op Superstores
- Champions: Ballygiblin (1st title); Fionn Herlihy (captain); Ronan Dwane (manager)
- Runners-up: Tracton; Michael O'Sullivan (captain); Tom McGuinness (captain); Frank Hickey (manager)
- Relegated: Dripsey

Tournament statistics
- Matches played: 24
- Goals scored: 62 (2.58 per match)
- Points scored: 709 (29.54 per match)
- Top scorer(s): Joseph O'Sullivan (1-53)

The 2022 Cork Premier Junior Hurling Championship was the inaugural staging of the Cork Premier Junior Hurling Championship. The draw for the group stage placings took place on 8 February 2022. The championship ran from 29 July to 15 October 2022.

The final was played on 15 October 2022 at Páirc Uí Chaoimh in Cork, between Tracton and Ballygiblin, in what was their first ever meeting in the final. Ballygiblin won the match by 2-19 to 1-12 to claim their first ever championship title in the grade.

Ballygiblin's Joseph O'Sullivan was the championship's top scorer with 1-53.

== Participating teams ==
Team	Location	Division	Colours
Argideen Rangers	Timoleague	Carbery	Maroon and white
Ballygarvan	Ballygarvan	Carrigdhoun	Red and white
Ballygiblin	Mitchelstown	Avondhu	Red and white
Barryroe	Barryroe	Carbery	Blue and navy
Dripsey	Dripsey	Muskerry	Blue and red
Glen Rovers	Blackpool	Seandun	Green, yellow and black
Kilbrittain	Kilbrittain	Carbery	Black and yellow
Milford	Milford	Avondhu	Blue and white
Russell Rovers	Shanagarry	Imokilly	Black and yellow
St. Catherine's	Ballynoe	Imokilly	Purple and yellow
St. Finbarr's	Togher	Seandun	Blue and yellow
Tracton	Minane Bridge	Carrigdhoun	Green and red

== Group A ==
=== Group A table ===
Advance to knockout stage Advance to relegation play-off

Team	Matches				Score			Pts
Team	Pld	W	D	L	For	Against	Diff	Pts
Kilbrittain	3	3	0	0	77	52	25	6
Milford	3	2	0	1	74	64	10	4
Barryroe	3	0	1	2	54	64	-10	1
St. Finbarr's	3	0	1	1	42	67	-25	1

=== Group A results ===
30 July 2022 Round 1	Barryroe	0-14 - 1-11	St. Finbarr's	BAllinhassig
	R O'Donovan 0-6, A McSweeney 0-4, D Kiely 0-2, Brian O'Donovan 0-1, R Kiely 0-1.		B O'Connell 0-4, J O'Brien 1-0, I O'Callaghan 0-3, D Callanan 0-1, A Buckley 0-1, P Kennedy 0-1, J McCarthy 0-1.

31 July 2022 Round 1	Kilbrittain	3-16 - 2-17	Milford	Coachford Sportsfield
	P Wall 1-4, M Hickey 0-7, S Shorten 1-0, C O'Donovan 1-0, B Butler 0-2, R Cashman 0-1, T Harrington 0-1, D Harrington 0-1.		C O'Gorman 1-4, B Murphy 1-2, E Dillon 0-5, S O'Connell 0-3, H O'Gorman 0-1, J O'Connor 0-1, T O'Flynn 0-1.

6 August 2022 Round 2	Milford	2-20 - 2-17	Barryroe	Coachford Sportsfield
	H O'Gorman 1-9, T O'Flynn 1-1, J O'Connor 0-4, E Dillon 0-1, C O'Gorman 0-1, M O'Flynn 0-1, A Watson 0-1, S O'Connell 0-1, B Murphy 0-1.		A McSweeney 0-11, Billy O'Donovan 1-0, D Kiely 1-0, Brian O'Dobovan 0-2, R O'Donovan 0-2, J Moloney 0-1, R Kiely 0-1.

7 August 2022 Round 2	Kilbrittain	1-25 - 0-13	St. Finbarr's	Carrigaline Grounds
	M Hickey 0-9, P Wall 1-5, M Sexton 0-3, S Sexton 0-1, S Crowley 0-1, N O'Donovan 0-1, C Ustianowski 0-1, C Sheehan 0-1, P O'Mahony 0-1, C Moloney 0-1.		B O'Connell 0-6, J O'Brien 0-3, I O'Callaghan 0-2, D Callanan 0-1, B Doyle 0-1.

26 August 2022 Round 3	Kilbrittain	3-15 - 2-11	Barryroe	Páirc Uí Ríogáin
	M Hickey 1-7, P Wall 2-1, S Shorten 0-3, B Butler 0-1, C Ustianowski 0-1, C Sheehan 0-1, R Cashman 0-1.		A McSweeney 0-7, R O'Donovan 1-1, R Kiely 1-1, D O'Driscoll 0-1, C Dineen 0-1.

26 August 2022 Round 3	Milford	2-17 - 0-15	St. Finbarr's	Kanturk Grounds
	H O'Gorman 0-8, A Watson 1-1, C O'Gorman 1-1, T O'Flynn 0-4, E Dillon 0-1, M O'Flynn 0-1, J O'Flynn 0-.		B O'Connell 0-10, P Kennedy 0-1, D Callanan 0-1, C Steele 0-1, I O'Callaghan 0-1, D Scannell 0-1.

== Group B ==
=== Group B table ===
Advance to knockout stage Advance to relegation play-off

Team	Matches				Score			Pts
Team	Pld	W	D	L	For	Against	Diff	Pts
Ballygiblin	3	3	0	0	75	51	24	6
Argideen Rangers	3	2	0	1	61	53	8	4
Ballygarvan	3	1	0	2	69	68	1	2
Dripsey	3	0	0	3	52	85	-33	0

=== Group B results ===
30 July 2022 Round 1	Dripsey	0-11 - 3-22	Ballygiblin	Bride Rovers Park
	M O'Riordan 0-9, E Maher 0-1, J Manley 0-1.		J O'Sullivan 1-15, C O'Mahony 1-2, S Beston 1-2, K Roche 0-1, D Sheehan 0-1, D Barry 0-1.

31 July 2022 Round 1	Ballygarvan	2-11 - 0-19	Argideen Rangers	Charlie Hurley Park
	S Fenton 1-3, K Lyons 1-1, M Kennefick 0-3, M Cussen 0-3, S Brady 0-1.		JM O'Callaghan 0-13, P Butler 0-2, S Walsh 0-2, D Holland 0-1, D O'Donovan 0-1.

6 August 2022 Round 2	Ballygaravn	2-18 - 0-25	Ballygiblin	Blarney Sportsfield
	M Cussen 0-7, K Lyons 1-3, N Dowd 1-0, M Kenefick 0-3, S Fenton 0-2, C Dowd 0-2, M O'Mahony 0-1.		J O'Sullivan 0-14, S Beston 0-6, C O'Mahony 0-3, M Keane 0-1, K Duggan 0-1.

7 August 2022 Round 2	Argideen Rangers	2-20 - 1-14	Dripsey	Brinny Grounds
	JM O'Callaghan 1-12, F Butler 1-1, F Walsh 0-2, S Maxwell 0-2, P Butler 0-1, D Holland 0-1, C O'Donovan 0-1.		M O'Riordan 0-11, G Murphy 1-0, J Manley 0-3.

26 August 2022 Round 3	Argideen Rangers	0-16 - 0-19	Ballygiblin	Riverstown Sportsfield
	JM O'Callaghan 0-10, P Butler 0-2, S Henchion 0-1, K Roche 0-1, E Lawton 0-1, F Butler 0-1,.		J O'Sullivan 0-7, S Beston 0-3, R Donegan 0-2, C O'Mahony 0-2, C English 0-2, M Keane 0-1, P Molloy 0-1, D Barry 0-1.

26 August 2022 Round 3	Ballygarvan	2-22 - 4-12	Dripsey	Éire Óg Grounds

== Group C ==
=== Group C table ===
Advance to knockout stage Advance to relegation play-off

Team	Matches				Score			Pts
Team	Pld	W	D	L	For	Against	Diff	Pts
Russell Rovers	3	3	0	0	54	41	13	6
Tracton	3	2	0	1	57	54	3	4
Glen Rovers	3	0	1	2	55	60	-5	1
St. Catherine's	3	0	1	2	49	60	-11	1

=== Group C results ===
29 July 2022 Round 1	St. Catherine's	0-10 - 2-10	Russell Rovers	Killeagh Grounds

31 July 2022 Round 1	Glen Rovers	0-17 - 2-14	Tracton	Ballinora Grounds
			R Walsh 0-8, D Harrington 1-1, M Byrne 1-1, D O'Flaherty 0-2, C Quinn 0-1, C McGuinness 0-1.

6 August 2022 Round 2	Glen Rovers	2-10 - 0-18	Russell Rovers	Páirc Lios gCúl

7 August 2022 Round 2	Tracton	3-13 - 1-14	St. Catherine's	Blarney Grounds
	D Harrington 2-1, D Byrne 1-0, R Walsh 0-3, J Good 0-3, D O'Flaherty 0-3, M O'Sullivan 0-2, M Byrne 0-1.

26 August 2022 Round 3	Tracton	1-12 - 1-17	Russel Rovers	Erin's Own Grounds
	R Walsh 0-6, M O'Sullivan 1-0, D Byrne 0-2, M Byrne 0-1, D O'Flaherty 0-1, P O'Riordan 0-1, D Harrington 0-1.

26 August 2022 Round 3	Glen Rovers	3-13 - 1-19	St. Catherine's	Páirc Lios gCúl

== Knockout stage ==
=== Bracket ===
Quarter-Finals
Milford (Avondhu)	1-20
Tracton (Carrigdhoun)	2-19
Russell Rovers (Imokilly)	1-19
Argideen Rangers (Carbery)	1-12

Semi-Finals
Kilbrittain (Carbery)	0-27
Tracton (Carrigdhoun)	1-25
Ballygiblin (Avondhu)	0-25
Russell Rovers (Imokilly)	1-19

Final
Tracton (Carrigdhoun)	1-12
Ballygiblin (Avondhu)	2-19

=== Relegation playoff ===
10 September 2022 Playoff	Dripsey	1-16 - 1-27	St. Finbarr's	Ballincollig Grounds

=== Quarter-finals ===
9 September 2022 Quarter-final	Milford	1-20 - 2-19	Tracton	Mourneabbey Grounds
	H O’Gorman (1-6, 0-6 frees), A Watson (0-5), M O’Flynn (0-1 sl) and B Murphy (0-3 each), E Dillon (0-2 frees), C O’Gorman (0-1).	Report	R Walsh (2-11, 1-8 frees, 0-2 65s), P O’Riordan (0-2), J Kingston, D Harrington, J Good, D Byrne, C Quinn and M Byrne (0-1 each).	Referee: J O'Leary (Midleton)

10 September 2022 Quarter-final	Russel Rovers	1-19 - 1-12	Argideen Rangers	Riverstown Sportsfield
	J Beausang 1-11 (0-5 f), B Hartnett 0-2, K Moynihan 0-2, K Walsh 0-2, J McGrath 0-1, R Cummins 0-1.	Report	JM O’Callaghan 0-8 (0-5 f), D O’Donovan 1-1, C O’Donovan 0-2, P Butler 0-1.	Referee: N Fahy (Brian Dillons)

=== Semi-finals ===
24 September 2022 Semi-final	Kilbrittain	0-25 - 1-27 (aet)	Tracton	Páirc Uí Riagáin
	M Hickey 0-12 f, R Cashman 0-4 f, C Sheehan and S Shorten 0-2 each, M Sexton, B Butler, T Harrington, P Wall and C Moloney 0-1 each.	Report	R Walsh 1-12 (0-12 f), D O’Flaherty 0-4, J Good 0-3, M O’Sullivan 0-2, D Harrington, D Byrne, M Byrne and K Webb 0-1 each.	Referee: B Sweeney (Erin's Own)

24 September 2022 Semi-final	Ballygiblin	0-25 - 1-19 (aet)	Russell Rovers	St. Catherine's Park
	J O'Sullivan 0-7 (0-5 f) D Flynn 0-4 (0-1 sl), R Donegan 0-4 (0-3 f, 0-1 65), S Beston, C O'Mahony 0-3 each, D Barry, K Duggan 0-2 each.	Report	J Beausang 0-9 (0-8 f), B Hartnett 1-4, K Moynihan 0-3, L Duggan-Murray, J McGrath, R Cummins 0-1 each.	Referee: B Barry-Murphy (Aghabullogue)

=== Final ===
15 October 2022 Final	Tracton	1-12 - 2-19	Ballygiblin	Páirc Uí Chaoimh
	R Walsh (0-5 frees); M Byrne (0-4, 2 frees); M O’Sullivan (1-0); D Byrne (0-2 frees); C McGuinness (0-1).	Report	J O’Sullivan (0-10, 5 frees); D Flynn (1-3, 0-1 free); C O’Mahony (0-4); S O’Sullivan (1-0); S Beston (0-2).	Referee: W Wallace (Aghada)

== Championship statistics ==
=== Top scorers ===
Rank	Player	County	Tally	Total	Matches	Average
1	Joseph O'Sullivan	Ballygiblin	1-53	56	5	11.20
2	Ronan Walsh	Tracton	3-45	54	6	9.00
3	J. M. O'Callaghan	Argideen Rangers	1-43	46	4	11.50
