= 1985 Cork Junior A Hurling Championship =

- Dates: 22 September – 27 October 1985
- Teams: 7
- Champions: Kilbrittain (1st title); Michael Hayes (captain); Pa Finn (manager)
- Runners-up: Cobh; Michael O'Connor (captain)

Tournament statistics
- Matches played: 6
- Goals scored: 25 (4.17 per match)
- Points scored: 114 (19 per match)
- Top scorer(s): Pa Brennan (4-10)

The 1985 Cork Junior A Hurling Championship was the 88th staging of the Cork Junior A Hurling Championship since its establishment by the Cork County Board. The championship ran from 22 September to 27 October 1985.

The final was played on 27 October 1985 at Páirc Uí Chaoimh in Cork, between Kilbrittain and Cobh, in what was their first ever meeting in the final. Kilbrittain won the match by 5-07 to 1-12 to claim their first ever championship title. It remains their only championship title.

Kilbrittain's Pa Brennan was the championship's top scorer with 4-10.

== Qualification ==
Division	Championship	Champions
Avondhu	North Cork Junior A Hurling Championship	Clyda Rovers
Carbery	South West Junior A Hurling Championship	Kilbrittain
Carrigdhoun	South East Junior A Hurling Championship	Ballymartle
Duhallow	Duhallow Junior A Hurling Championship	Lismire
Imokilly	East Cork Junior A Hurling Championship	Cobh
Muskerry	Mid Cork Junior A Hurling Championship	Blarney
Seandún	City Junior A Hurling Championship	St. Finbarr's

== Results ==
=== Quarter-finals ===
22 September 1985 Quarter-final	Kilbrittain	3-14 - 4-02	St. Finbarr's	Jack Barrett Memorial Park
	P Brennan 1-5, D O'Neill 1-2, C O'Connell 1-0, D Healy 0-3, G O'Connell 0-2, M Cadogan 0-1, T Brennan 0-1.		S Gillen 2-1, P O'Brien 1-0, K Burke 1-0, J Tobin 0-1.	Referee: D Collins (Kinsale)

22 September 1985 Quarter-final	Blarney	1-14 - 2-09	Lismire	O'Connell Memorial Park
	D Buckley 0-9, D Mullane 1-0, A Murphy 0-2, C O'Mahony 0-2, J Coakley 0-1.		J O'Connor 0-6, P Vaughan 1-1, J Sweeney 1-0, J Noonan 0-2.

6 October 1985 Quarter-final	Ballymartle	2-09 - 0-10	Clyda Rovers	Páirc Uí Chaoimh
	B Coleman 1-1, J Webb 0-4, G McCarthy 1-0, M Fitzpatrick 0-2, J Butler 0-1, J McCarthy 0-1.		C O'Callaghan 0-4, M O'Hanlon 0-2, N Carey 0-2, T O'Callaghan 0-1, P Curtin 0-1.	Referee: M O'Flaherty

=== Semi-finals ===
6 October 1985 Semi-final	Kilbrittain	3-10 - 1-07	Blarney	Páirc Naomh Eoin
	P Brennan 2-4, C O'Connell 1-0, D Healy 0-3, J O'Sullivan 0-1, M Holland 0-1, D O'Neill 0-1.		A Murphy 1-2, D Buckley 0-1, D Mullane 0-1, M Ryan 0-1, M Dilworth 0-1, R O'Sullivan 0-1.

13 October 1985 Semi-final	Cobh	2-11 - 1-09	Ballymartle	Manning Park
	Tony O'Connor 1-2, M Sloane 1-0, G Mangan 0-3, T Butler 0-2, O Coughlan 0-2, B Frahill 0-1, P Devlin 0-1.		M Fitzpatrick 0-4, K McCarthy 1-0, J O'Mahony 0-2, J McCarthy 0-1, J O'Mahony 0-1, B Murphy 0-1.

=== Final ===
27 October 1985 Final	Kilbrittain	5-07 - 1-12	Cobh	Páirc Uí Chaoimh
	C O'Connell 2-1, J O'Sullivan 2-1, P Brennan 1-1, D Healy 0-3, D O'Neill 0-1.		G Morgan 1-4, T O'Connor 0-4, M Sloane 0-2, B Frahill 0-1, O Coughlan 0-1.	Referee: P Cronin (St. Finbarr's)

== Championship statistics ==
=== Top scorers ===
Rank	Player	County	Tally	Total	Matches	Average
1	Pa Brennan	Kilbrittain	4-10	22	3	7.33
2	Charlie O'Connell	Kilbrittain	4-01	13	3	4.33
3	Ger Morgan	Cobh	1-07	10	2	5.00
3	Donal Buckley	Blarney	0-10	10	2	5.00
5	Tony O'Connor	Cobh	1-06	9	2	4.50
5	Denis Healy	Kilbrittain	1-06	9	2	4.50
7	Jim O'Sullivan	Kilbrittain	2-02	8	3	2.66
8	Séamus Gillen	St. Finbarr's	2-01	7	1	7.00
8	Denis O'Neill	Kilbrittain	1-04	7	3	2.33
8	Anthony Murphy	Blarney	1-04	7	2	3.50
