= 2017 Cork Junior A Hurling Championship =

- Dates: 15 September – 7 November 2017
- Teams: 14
- Sponsor: Evening Echo
- Champions: St Catherine's (2nd title); Daniel Mangan (captain); Denis Walsh (manager)
- Runners-up: Brian Dillons; John Horgan (captain); Tommy Boland (manager)

Tournament statistics
- Matches played: 14
- Goals scored: 34 (2.43 per match)
- Points scored: 381 (27.21 per match)
- Top scorer(s): John Horgan (1-40)

The 2017 Cork Junior Hurling Championship was the 120th staging of the Cork Junior Hurling Championship since its establishment by the Cork County Board in 1895. The championship draw took place on 28 August 2017. The championship began on 15 September 2017 and ended 7 November 2017.

On 7 November 2017, St Catherine's won the championship following a 0-13 to 0-12 defeat of Brian Dillons in the final. This was their second championship title in the grade and their first since 1983.

== Qualification ==
Division	Championship	Champions	Runners-up
Avondhu	North Cork Junior A Hurling Championship	Dromina	Ballyhooly
Carbery	West Cork Junior A Hurling Championship	Clonakilty	Ballinascarthy
Carrigdhoun	South East Junior A Hurling Championship	Valley Rovers	Tracton
Duhallow	Duhallow Junior A Hurling Championship	Banteer	Kilbrin
Imokilly	East Cork Junior A Hurling Championship	St Catherine's	Russell Rovers
Muskerry	Mid Cork Junior A Hurling Championship	Cloughduv	Kilmichael
Seandún	City Junior A Hurling Championship	Nemo Rangers	Brian Dillons

== Results ==
=== Bracket ===
First Round
Banteer (Duhallow)	1-15
Brian Dillons (Seandun)	2-20
Dromina (Avondhu)	2-20
Kilmichael (Muskerry)	0-09
Nemo Rangers (Seandun)	1-14
Ballinascarthy (Carbery)	0-09
Clonakilty (Carbery)	1-14
Ballyhooly (Avondhu)	1-17 (AET)
Valley Rovers (Carrigdhoun)	0-08
Russell Rovers (Imokilly)	5-15
Cloughduv (Muskerry)	1-10
Kilbrin (Duhallow)	4-15
St Catherine's (Imokilly)	2-12
Tracton (Carrigdhoun)	1-03

Quarter-Finals
Brian Dillons (Seandun)	1-19
Dromina (Avondhu)	0-09
Nemo Rangers (Seandun)	0-17
Ballyhooly (Avondhu)	0-14
Russell Rovers (Imokilly)	0-17
Kilbrin (Duhallow)	2-10
St Catherine's (Imokilly)
Bye

Semi-Finals
Brian Dillons (Seandun)	0-26
Nemo Rangers (Seandun)	2-14
Russell Rovers (Imokilly)	2-10
St Catherine's (Imokilly)	3-17

Final
Brian Dillons (Seandun)	1-13, 0-12
St Catherine's (Imokilly)	2-10, 0-13

=== Round 1 ===
15 September 2017 Round 1	Banteer	1-15 - 2-20	Brian Dillons	Páirc Uí Rinn
	D Roche 0-8, T Sexton 1-0, D McAuliffe 0-3, K Tarrant 0-2, D Murphy 0-1.		J Horgan 1-9, C McCarthy 0-4, J Feehan 1-0, C Lynch 0-3, D Rodgers 0-1, M White 0-1, T Lawrence 0-1, K McCormack 0-1.

16 September 2017 Round 1	Ballinascarthy	0-09 - 1-14	Nemo Rangers	Páirc Naomh Eoin
	J Ryan 0-6, R O'Flynn 0-1, D Hennessy 0-1, S Ryan 0-1.		B Twomey 0-12, K O'Donovan 1-0, S Horgan 0-2.

16 September 2017 Round 1	St Catherine's	2-12 - 1-03	Tracton	Felix Sarsfield Memorial Park

16 September 2017 Round 1	Dromina	2-20 - 0-09	Kilmichael	Banteer Sportsfield

16 September 2017 Round 1	Ballyhooly	1-17 - 1-14 (aet)	Clonakilty	Blarney Grounds
	J Roche 0-9, D Linehan 1-2, J Mehigan 0-3, S Murphy 0-2, S Linehan 0-1.		S McEvoy 1-3, S White 0-5, T Clancy 0-4, P O'Sullivan 0-1, M Scally 0-1.

20 September 2017 Round 1	Russell Rovers	5-15 - 0-08	Valley Rovers	Páirc Uí Rinn
	J Beausang 3-6, K Walsh 0-4, E McGrath 1-0, B Hartnett 1-0, K Tattan 0-1, E O'Sullivan 0-1, D Moynihan 0-1, L Murray 0-1, JP Ivers 0-1.		R Butler 0-4, D Sweetnam 0-1, A O'Brien 0-1, M O'Brien 0-1, A Settini 0-1, G Deane 0-1.

23 September 2017 Round 1	Cloughduv	1-10 - 4-15	Kilbrin	Castletownroche Grounds
	J Ryan 1-2, M Verling 0-5, M Walsh 0-1, B Ahern 0-1, K Walsh 0-1.		E Sheehan 2-2, S O'Reilly 0-6, S Crowley 1-1, G Lenihan 0-4, T O'Reilly 1-0, D Daly 0-1, W Egan 0-1.

=== Quarter-finals ===
29 September 2017 Quarter-final	Brian Dillons	1-19 - 0-09	Dromina	Mallow GAA Complex
	C Lynch 1-6, J Horgan 0-5, C McCarthy 0-4, P O'Brien 0-2, D Rodgers 0-1, D Coughlan 0-1.		D Jones 0-7, B Buckley 0-1, G Hayes 0-1.

29 September 2017 Quarter-final	Kilbrin	2-10 - 0-17	Russell Rovers	Páirc Mac Gearailt
	S O'Reilly 0-9, S Crowley 1-1, E Sheehan 1-0.		J Beausang 0-6, B Hartnett 0-4, K Walsh 0-2, K Moynihan 0-2, E O'Sullivan 0-2, J Aherne 0-1.

7 October 2017 Quarter-final	Ballyhooly	0-14 - 0-17	Nemo Rangers	Páirc Bhríde
	J Roche 0-11, D Linehan 0-1, S Roche 0-1, F O'Connell 0-1.		B Twomey 0-7, C Kiely 0-4, E Dilloughrey 0-2, K O'Donovan 0-2, S Horgan 0-1, A O'Donovan 0-1.

- St. Catherine's received a bye to the semi-final stage.

=== Semi-finals ===
13 October 2017 Semi-final	Russell Rovers	2-10 - 3-17	St Catherine's	Páirc Uí Rinn
	J Beausang 1-6, B Hartnett 1-1, E O'Sullivan 0-1, K Walsh 0-1, K Tattan 0-1.		D Mangan 1-4, B Mulcahy 1-2, S O'Brien 0-5, R Galvin 1-0, S Cotter 0-3, S Kearney 0-2, P Roche 0-1.

28 October 2017 Semi-final	Brian Dillons	0-26 - 2-14	Nemo Rangers	Páirc Uí Rinn
	J Horgan 0-10, R Murphy 0-6, D Rodgers 0-4, T Lawrence 0-2, C Lynch 0-1, K Varien 0-1, C McCarthy 0-1, K Coughlan 0-1.		B Twomey 0-8, S Horgan 1-2, K O'Donovan 1-0, W Morgan 0-3, P Kerrigan 0-1.

=== Final ===
5 November 2017 Final	St Catherine's	2-10 - 1-13	Brian Dillons	Páirc Uí Rinn
	D Mangan 2-1, B Mulcahy 0-5, S O'Brien 0-3, P Roche 0-1.		J Horgan 0-9, D Rodgers 1-1, C Lynch 0-2, T Lawrence 0-1.	Referee: J Murphy (Castletownroche)

=== Final replay ===
7 November 2017 Final replay	St Catherine's	0-13 - 0-12	Brian Dillons	Páirc Uí Rinn
	R Clancy 0-6, B Mulcahy 0-3, S O'Brien 0-1, R O'Connell 0-1, P O'Connor 0-1, D Mangan 0-1.		J Horgan 0-7, C Lynch 0-3, D Rodgers 0-1, C McCarthy 0-1.	Referee: D Copps (Ballyhea)

== Championship statistics ==
=== Top scorers ===
Rank	Player	County	Tally	Total	Matches	Average
1	John Horgan	Brian Dillons	1-40	43	5	8.60
2	Josh Beausang	Russell Rovers	4-18	30	5	6.00
3	Brian Twomey	Nemo Rangers	0-27	27	3	9.00
