= 1956 Cork Junior Hurling Championship =

Irish hurling competition

- Teams: 7
- Champions: St Finbarr's (1st title)
- Runners-up: Castletownroche

The 1956 Cork Junior Hurling Championship was the 59th staging of the Cork Junior Hurling Championship since its establishment by the Cork County Board in 1895.

The final was played on 18 November 1956 at the Athletic Grounds in Cork, between St Finbarr's and Castletownroche, in what was their first ever meeting in the final. St Finbarr's won the match by 4-08 to 3-03 to claim their first ever championship title.

== Results ==
=== Final ===
18 November 1956 Final	St Finbarr's	4-08 - 3-03	Castletownroche	Cork Athletic Grounds
