= Ciarán Sheehan (dual player) =

Irish sportsman (born 1990)

Personal information
- Native name: Ciarán Ó Síocháin (Irish)
- Born: 19 November 1990 (age 35) Farran, County Cork, Ireland
- Height: 6 ft 2 in (188 cm)

Sport
- Sport: Gaelic football
- Position: Full Forward
Club
- Years: Club
- 2007–2013 2019–: Éire Óg
Inter-county*
Years	County	Apps (scores)
2010–2013 2020–2021	Cork	11 (0–16)
Inter-county titles
- Munster titles: 1
- All-Irelands: 1
- NFL: 2
- *Inter County team apps and scores correct as of 00:46, 5 July 2011.

Ciarán Sheehan (born 19 November 1990) is an Irish sportsman. Sheehan played Gaelic football and hurling with his local club Éire Óg, his divisional side Muskerry, and was a member of the Cork senior football team from 2010 until 2013. He signed a two-year contract to play Australian rules football with the Carlton Football Club in 2013, later returning to Ireland.

== Early and personal life ==
Born in Farran, County Cork, Sheehan was educated at Scoil Naomh Mhuire Fearann in the village before later attending Coachford Community College for 3 years and then Coláiste Choilm in nearby Ballincollig. Here he played on the school football team, winning Cork colleges and Munster honours in all grades. Sheehan later attended Cork Institute of Technology, where he studied services engineering. As of 2022, Sheehan was working for a renewable energy research company in Cork.

== Playing career ==
=== Club ===
Sheehan has played his club hurling and football with the Éire Óg club. After progressing through various juvenile grades, he played as a dual player for the club in the minor grades. In 2006, he won a Cork Minor A Football Championship with the club, following a victory over Mitchelstown GAA.

Two years later, Sheehan added a Cork Minor A Hurling Championship medal to his collection after defeating Erin's Own in the final.

By 2008, Sheehan had become a key forward on the Éire Óg's junior football team. He won a Mid Cork title that year following a one-goal victory over Dripsey. Sheehan's side later claimed the Cork Junior Football Championship following a 1–8 to 1–5 defeat of Ballygarvan.

In 2019, he won a Cork Premier Intermediate Football Championship after his return from Australia.

=== Minor, Under-21 and Junior ===
Sheehan first played for Cork with the county's minor football team in 2007. That year he won a Munster Minor Football Championship title following a 1–16 to 2–8 defeat of Kerry.

By 2008, Sheehan had made it onto the Cork minor hurling team. He added a Munster Minor Hurling Championship title to his collection following a one-point defeat of Tipperary.

Sheehan subsequently joined the Cork under-21 panels in both codes. In 2009, he won a Munster Under-21 Football Championship title following a 1–9 to 2–5 defeat of Tipperary. Cork later played Down in an All-Ireland final. It took a late goal from Colm O'Driscoll to secure a 1–13 to 2–9 victory for Cork and an All-Ireland Under-21 Football Championship medal for Sheehan.

In 2009, Sheehan won a Munster Junior Football Championship title, following a 1–21 to 0–13 defeat of Clare. Sheehan, however, did not play any part in Cork's subsequent All-Ireland Junior Football Championship victory.

After a quiet season in 2010, Sheehan secured a second Munster under-21 football title in 2011 following a 2–24 to 0–8 win over Kerry. Cork were subsequently installed as the favourites to take the All-Ireland title once again, however, Sheehan's side were defeated by Galway.

=== Senior ===
Sheehan made his senior debut for Cork when he came on as a substitute against Dublin in a National League game in 2010. By the end of the campaign he had established himself at full-forward and went on to win a National League title with a 1–17 to 0–12 defeat of Mayo in the final. Sheehan later made his championship debut in a drawn Munster semi-final with Kerry. Cork lost the replay but qualified for the All-Ireland final via the qualifiers. Down provided the opposition and a tight game developed on a wet day. Sheehan chipped in with a point as Cork won by 0–16 to 0–15. It was Sheehan's first All-Ireland Senior Football Championship winners' medal and Cork's first championship title in twenty years.

In 2011, Cork retained their status as National League champions following a 0–21 to 2–14 defeat of Dublin in the final. It was Sheehan's second winners' medal in that competition. He later lined out in his first Munster final, however, Kerry retained their provincial title with a 1–15 to 1–12 victory. Sheehan's season came to an end in that game as he tore his cruciate ligament early in the second half.

=== International rules ===
He played twice for Ireland against Australia in the 2013 International Rules Series. Sheehan was awarded the Player of the Series title for his efforts in the Irish record victory.

Ciarán Sheehan

Personal information
- Full name: Ciarán Sheehan
- Draft: 60 (2013 AFL Rookie Draft)
- Height: 188 cm (74 in)
- Weight: 80 kg (176 lb)
- Position: Half-back

Playing career^{1}
Years	Club	Games (Goals)
2014–2017	Carlton	6 (0)
- ^{1} Playing statistics correct to the end of 2017.

=== Move to AFL ===
In November 2013, Sheehan signed to play Australian rules football for professional Australian Football League club Carlton, on a two-year contract from January 2014. Sheehan had previously trialed with Carlton during 2009 without signing a contract, but re-opened discussions with the club following the 2013 International Rules series. Sheehan joined fellow Gaelic footballers Zach Tuohy of Laois and Ciarán Byrne of Louth, both at Carlton. After playing for Carlton's VFL-affiliate, the Northern Blues, for much of his first season, Sheehan made his senior debut for Carlton on 9 August 2014 against Gold Coast. He played the last four games of the 2014 season and won the award as Carlton's best first year player for the season. However, recurring hamstring injuries hampered the rest of his career, and he managed only two more senior games over the next three years before being delisted at the end of 2017.

=== Return to Ireland ===
Sheehan returned to Ireland and the Cork senior football team in 2020. He retired from inter-county football in 2021. As of 2021, he was still playing club football with Éire Óg, and he was named a selector for Cork's U20 football team in 2022.

While playing football with Éire Óg, Sheehan "switched" to Russell Rovers for club hurling in 2023. He was captain of the Russell Rovers team that won the 2024 Cork Premier Junior Hurling Championship.

== Statistics ==
Statistics are correct to round 19 of the 2017 season

Legend
G	Goals	K	Kicks	D	Disposals	T	Tackles
B	Behinds	H	Handballs	M	Marks

Season	Team	No.	Games	Totals							Averages (per game)						
Season	Team	No.	Games	G	B	K	H	D	M	T	G	B	K	H	D	M	T
2014	Carlton	47	4	0	1	33	17	50	9	6	0.0	0.3	8.3	4.3	12.5	2.3	1.5
2015	Carlton	47	0	—	—	—	—	—	—	—	—	—	—	—	—	—	—
2016	Carlton	21	0	—	—	—	—	—	—	—	—	—	—	—	—	—	—
2017	Carlton	21	2	0	0	11	8	19	5	2	0.0	0.0	5.5	4.0	9.5	2.5	1.0
Career			6	0	1	44	25	69	14	8	0.0	0.2	7.3	4.2	11.5	2.3	1.3

== See also ==
- List of players who have converted from one football code to another
