= Kilbrittain GAA =

Gaelic games club in County Cork, Ireland

Kilbrittain
- Cill Briotáin
- Founded: 1904
- County: Cork
- Colours
- Grounds: Kilbrittain GAA Grounds

Playing kits
Standard colours

Senior Club Championships
	All Ireland	Munster champions	Cork champions
Hurling:	0	0	0

Kilbrittain GAA is a Gaelic Athletic Association club in Kilbrittain, County Cork, Ireland. The club is affiliated to the Carbery Board and fields teams in both hurling and Gaelic football.

== History ==
Located in the village of Kilbrittain, about 8 km from Bandon, Kilbrittain GAA Club was established in 1904. The club has spent the majority of its existence operating in the junior grades. Kilbrittain dominated the early years of the newly established South West JAHC and won five titles in six years between 1925 and 1930. The divisional double was achieved in 1926 when Kilbrittain claimed their sole South West JAFC title.

Kilbrittain's 12th divisional title in 1985 was subsequently converted into a Cork JAHC title after a 5–07 to 1–12 win over Cobh in the final. A decade later, Kilbrittain won the Cork IHC title and secured senior status for the first time. A second Cork IHC was won in 2010, however, Kilbrittain subsequently slipped down the various grades. The club had its most recent success in 2025, when the Cork PJHC title was won after a one-point win over Glen Rovers. Kilbrittain later became the first West Cork club to win the Munster Club JHC title, before later winning the All-Ireland Club JHC title, after beating Easkey of Sligo in the final.

== Honours ==
- All-Ireland Junior Club Hurling Championship (1): 2026
- Munster Junior Club Hurling Championship (1): 2025
- Cork Intermediate Hurling Championship (2): 1995, 2010
- Cork Premier Junior Hurling Championship (1): 2025
- Cork Junior A Hurling Championship (1): 1985
- Carbery Junior A Hurling Championship (12): 1925, 1926, 1927, 1928, 1930, 1938, 1940, 1941, 1942, 1978, 1984, 1985
- Carbery Junior A Football Championship (1): 1926
- Cork Junior B Football Championship (2): 1992, 2009
- Cork Junior B Inter-Divisional Football Championship (1): 2016
- Carbery Junior B Football Championship (4): 1970, 1992, 2009, 2016
- Carbery Junior B Hurling Championship (5): 1946, 1951, 1958, 1967, 2021
- Carbery Junior C Hurling Championship (3): 1983, 1993, 2010
- Carbery Junior D Football Championship (4): 1982, 1984, 1987, 2003
- West Cork Under-21 A Hurling Championship (8): 1979, 1983, 1984, 1986, 2001, 2004, 2007, 2011
- West Cork Under 21 B Hurling Championship (1): 2021
- West Cork Under-21 B Football Championship (1): 2011
- West Cork Under-21 C Football Championship (1): 2014
- Cork Minor A Hurling Championship (1): 1992 (As Seaside Rovers)
- Cork Minor B Football Championship (1): 1993 (As Seaside Rovers)
- Cork Minor C Football Championship (1): 2008

== Notable players ==
- Dan O'Connell
- Owen Sexton
