= Ballynoe, Kinnatalloon =

Village in County Cork, Ireland

Ballynoe An Baile Nua
- Village
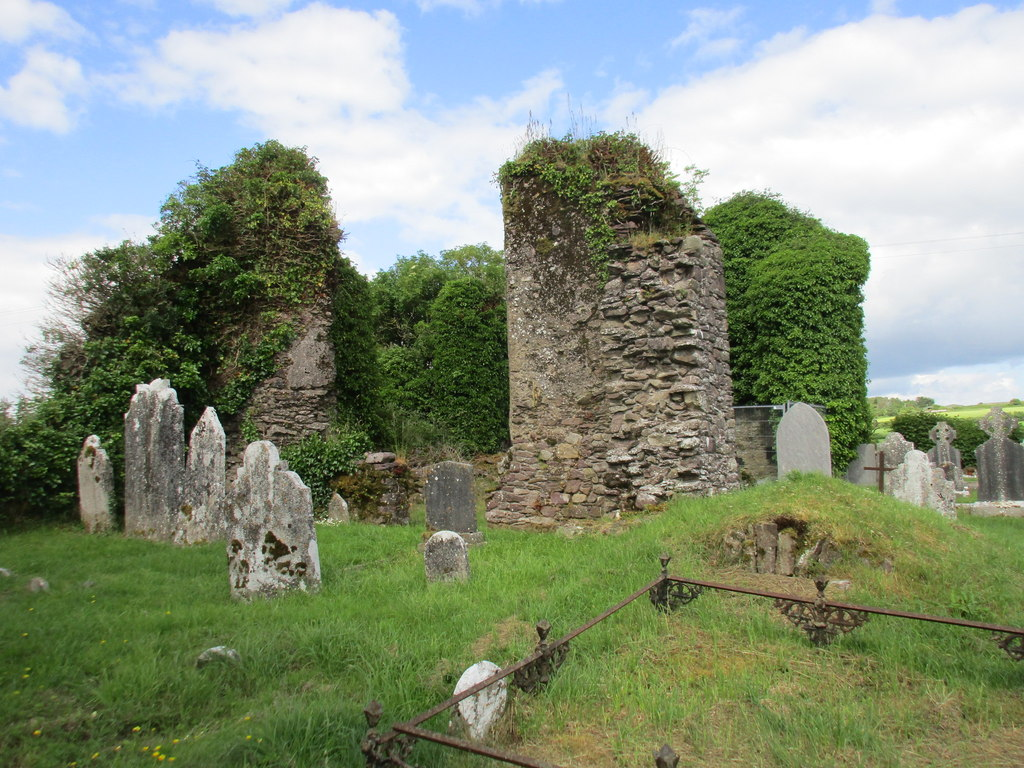
- Church ruins in Ballynoe

- Location in Ireland
- Coordinates: 52°03′33″N 08°05′51″W
- Country: Ireland
- Province: Munster
- County: County Cork

Population (2016)
  - Total: 141
- Time zone: UTC+0 (WET)
  - Summer (DST): UTC-1 (IST (WEST))

Ballynoe (Irish: An Baile Nua) is a village in the barony of Kinnatalloon, County Cork, in Ireland. It gives its name to a civil parish and electoral division. The 2011 census gave its population as 146. St Catherine's is the local Gaelic Athletic Association team. Located within a graveyard, which contains a ruined medieval church, is a freestanding mausoleum, built in the early 1800s for Elizabeth Nason. The Nasons were local landowners with estates from Clondulane to Youghal.

== Notable residents ==
- Bartholomew MacCarthy was a scholar and chronologist who wrote extensively on Early Irish literature.
