= Dairygold =

Irish dairy co-operative

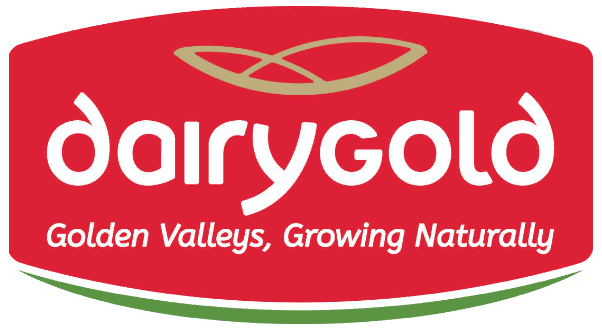
- Type: Cooperative
- Industry: Dairy Ingredients
- Founded: 1990
- Headquarters: Mitchelstown, County Cork, Ireland
- Area served: Global
- Key people: Seán O'Brien (chairman); Michael Harte (CEO)
- Revenue: ▼€1.4 billion (2023)
- Operating income: ▼€55.0 million (2023)
- Net income: ▼€23.9 million (2023)
- Members: 7000
- Number of employees: 1,273
- Website: Dairygold.ie

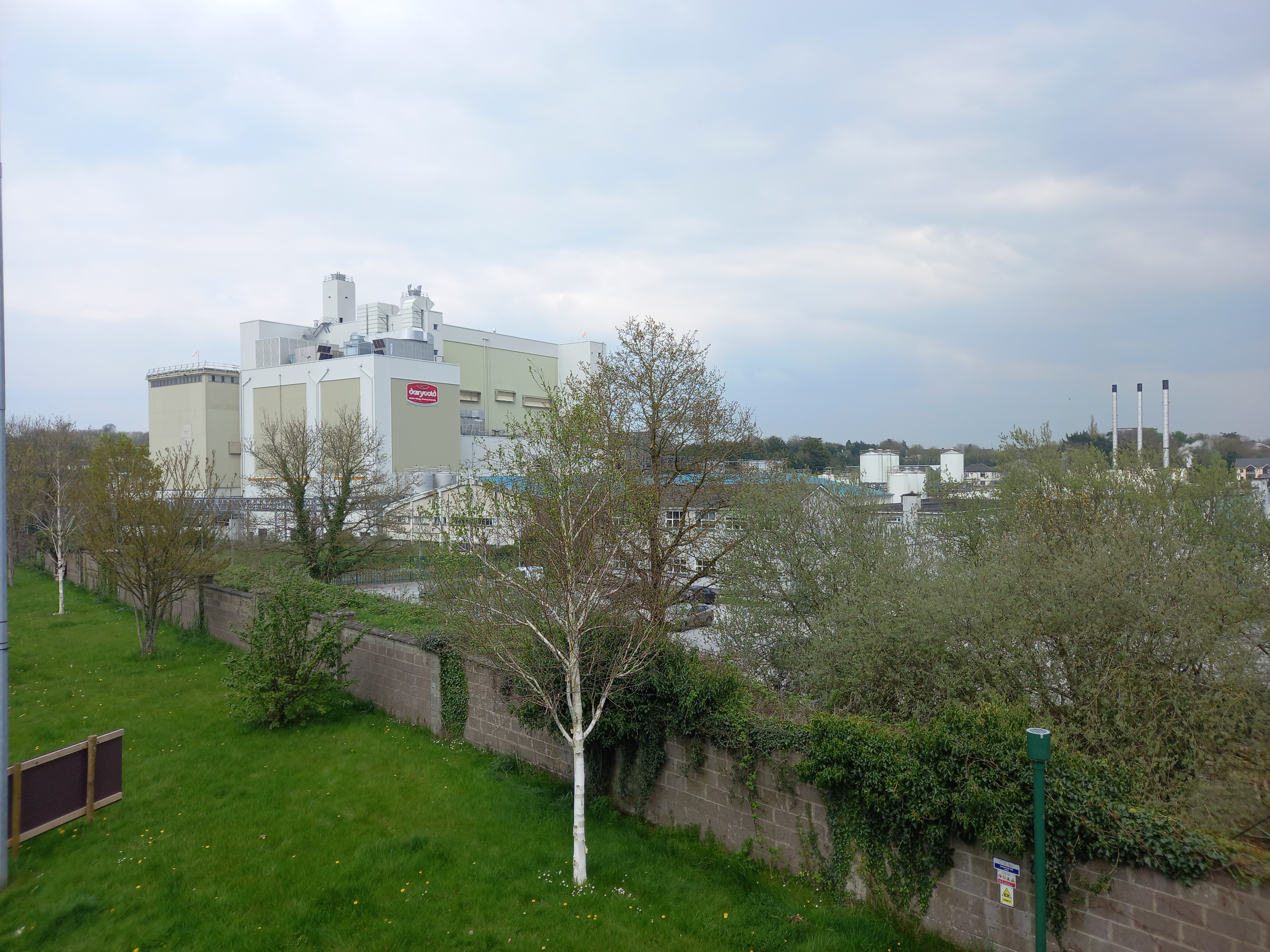
Milk powders factory in Mallow, County Cork

Dairygold Co-Operative Society Limited is an Irish dairy co-operative based in Mitchelstown, County Cork, Ireland. With its catchment area mostly in the Golden Vale, Dairygold processes an annual volume of approximately 1.43 billion liters of grass fed pastureland milk, making it Ireland's second largest dairy co-operative and the island's third largest milk supplier. Formed after the 1989 merger of the Mitchelstown and Ballyclough co-ops, as of 2023 it had 7000 shareholder members and an operating profit of €24 million from a turnover of €1.4 billion.

With approximately 1,200 employees, Dairygold is divided into three operating divisions; Dairy Ingredients (milk powders and cheese), Agri (servicing local farmers), and its retail network of shops in the Munster region. Its main products are rennet casein, demineralised whey for the infant formula and protein powders markets, bulk cheddar for the UK market and specialty cheeses for Greece. Dairygold exports to over 50 countries and has production facilities in Ireland and the UK, as well as sales offices in Germany, Spain and China. It is governed by a board of directors, consisting of both shareholder farmers and non-executives, as well as a number of regional committee positions held by shareholder members.

== History ==
Mitchelstown Co-Operative had been Ireland's largest co-operative for over fifty years until 1989. This farmers "co-op" was founded in 1919 under the leadership of local farmer Con O'Brien of Killickane, who chaired the co-op for its first 40 years and then became honorary life president until his death in 1968. Between 1919 and 1989, Mitchelstown Co-op Creameries became the largest dairy processing business on the island of Ireland. It was known for its processed cheese brands and the variety of its natural cheeses which were exported around Europe.

Cork's two largest dairy co-operatives, Mitchelstown (serving North Cork) and Ballyclough (owned by Mallow to Macroom farmers and founded in 1908), merged in 1990 as Dairygold, becoming Ireland's largest dairy co-operative, a position it has since held.

In 2006 Breeo Foods, the consumer foods subsidiary of Dairygold, was acquired by Kerry Group for €140 million. This included, among other brands, the Dairygold butter and butter spread; others included Country Pride and Golden Pasture, the Galtee, Shaws and Roscrea cooked meats, Sno Yogurts, Sno Desserts, Sno Cottage Cheese, CMP Dairies milk, cream and juices drink ranges and various own brands; the former of which continues to be sold by Kerry Group for supermarkets.

== Operations ==
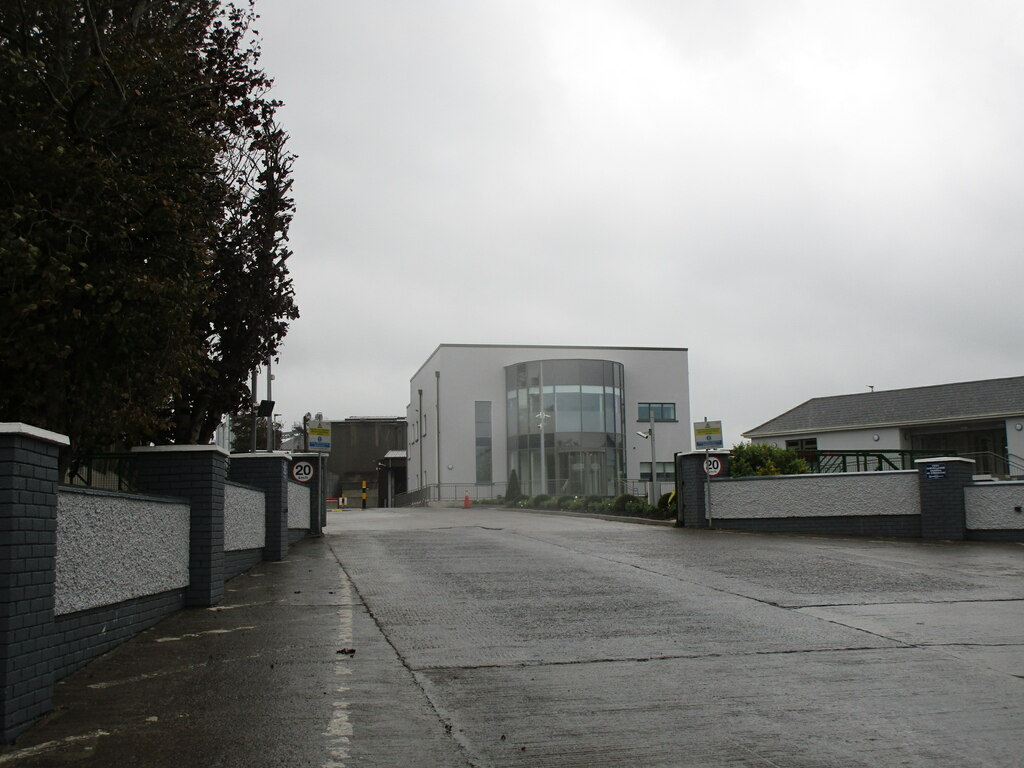
Dairygold Agri Business plant in Lombardstown, County Cork

The society has approximately 1,200 employees, 3,000 milk suppliers and over 7,000 shareholders, with offices in Ireland, the UK, Barcelona, Mainz and Shanghai. Finished dairy products as well as feed ingredients such as butter, cheese and milk powder account for 70% of Dairygold's annual revenue. The Agribusiness section, which produces animal feed and fertilizers, accounts for the remaining 30%. The Agri division distributes products through its network of 39 stores located across Munster, under the Co-Op Store and Co-Op Superstore retail brands.
