= St Catherine's GAA =

Gaelic games club in County Cork, Ireland

St Catherine's
- Naomh Caitrionaigh
- Founded: 1946
- County: Cork
- Colours
- Grounds: Páirc Naomh Caitríonaigh
- Coordinates: 52°03′40.75″N 8°05′38.78″W

Playing kits
Standard colours

Senior Club Championships
	All Ireland	Munster champions	Cork champions
Camogie:	0	0	1

St Catherine's GAA Club is a Gaelic Athletic Association club in Ballynoe, County Cork, Ireland. The club is affiliated to the East Cork Board and fields teams in both hurling and Gaelic football.

== History ==
Located in the village of Ballynoe, on the Cork–Waterford border, St Catherine's GAA Club was founded in 1946. The club has spent most of its existence operating in the junior grade, winning East Cork JAHC titles in 1957, 1981 and 1983. The last of these divisional wins was subsequently converted into a Cork JHC title, after a 1–13 to 1–08 win over Aghabullogue in the final.

Just over a decade after this initial breakthrough, St Catherine's secured senior status for the first time in their history when they won the Cork IHC in 1994 with a win over Cloughduv. After being relegated in 2003, St Catherine's made an immediate return to the top flight the following year when they became the inaugural winners of the Cork PIHC title, following a 1–11 to 1–08 defeat of Courcey Rovers.

After going from junior to senior ranks in just over 20 years, St Catherine's went through a rapid period of decline over the course of a seven-year period. Back-to-back relegations in 2008 and 2009 were followed by relegation to the East Cork JAHC in 2014. The club bounced back in 2017 by winning their second Cork JAHC title.

St Catherine's lost the 2023 Cork PJHC final to Erin's Own, however, a rule prohibiting second teams from participating in provincial competitions resulted in St Catherine's representing Cork in the Munster Club JHC. After winning that title, St Catherine's were later beaten by Tullogher–Rosbercon in the 2004 All-Ireland Club JHC final.

== Honours ==
- Cork Senior Camogie Championship (1): 2009
- Cork Premier Intermediate Hurling Championship (1): 2004
- Cork Intermediate Hurling Championship (1): 1994
- Munster Junior Club Hurling Championship (1): 2023
- Cork Junior A Hurling Championship (2): 1983, 2017
- East Cork Junior A Hurling Championship (3): 1957, 1981, 1983
- Cork Under-21 B Hurling Championship (1): 2011

== Notable players ==
- Cathal Casey: All-Ireland SHC–winner (1990)
- Johnny Sheehan: All-Ireland SHC–winner (1999)
- Denis Walsh: All-Ireland SHC–winner (1986, 1990) and All-Ireland SFC–winner (1989, 1990)
