= 1992 Cork Intermediate Hurling Championship =

Irish hurling competition

- Dates: 15 May 1992 – 25 October 1992
- Teams: 21
- Champions: Bishopstown (1st title); Bryan Murphy (captain); Noel Collins (manager)
- Runners-up: Cloyne; Kieran O'Shea (captain); John Lomasney (manager)

Tournament statistics
- Matches played: 21
- Goals scored: 59 (2.81 per match)
- Points scored: 431 (20.52 per match)
- Top scorer(s): Philip Cahill (2-19)

The 1992 Cork Intermediate Hurling Championship was the 83rd staging of the Cork Intermediate Hurling Championship since its establishment by the Cork County Board in 1909. The draw for the opening round fixtures took place on 15 December 1991.

On 25 October 1992, Bishopstown won the championship following a 1-09 to 0-09 defeat of CLoyne in the final. This was their first ever championship title.

Cloyne's Philip Cahill was the championship's top scorer with 2-19.

== Results ==
=== First round ===
15 May 1992 First round	Ballincollig	1-09 - 1-14	Mallow	Blarney
	D Lucey 1-0, J McCullagh 0-3, P O'Mahony 0-3, P Hennessy 0-1, D Dwyer 0-1, J O'Mahony 0-1.		R Sheehan 1-5, R O'Connell 0-6, F McCormack 0-1, J O'Mahony 0-1.

16 May 1992 First round	Youghal	1-13 - 0-06	Cobh	Cloyne
	E Coleman 0-6, T O'Connell 1-1, M Walsh 0-2, V Murray 0-1, S Doyle 0-1, A Murphy 0-1, F O'Sullivan 0-1.		R Meaney 0-3, T Butler 0-1, M Meaney 0-1, M Walker 0-1.

17 May 1992 First round	Cloughduv	1-09 - 2-15	St. Catherine's	Páirc Uí Chaoimh
	K Murray 1-6, T Barry-Murphy 0-1, T O'Riordan 0-1, J Hall 0-1.		C Clancy 0-8, K Morrison 1-0, S Buckley 1-0, D Walsh 0-5, J Sheehan 0-2.

17 May 1992 First round	Inniscarra	3-06 - 3-16	Delanys	Páirc Uí Chaoimh
	G Manley 3-3, D Murphy 0-2, P Aherne 0-1.		B Egan 1-7, M McElhinney 2-3, C Walsh 0-3, R O'Sullivan 0-1, D McElhinney 0-1, L Foley 0-1.

5 June 1992 First round	Cloyne	0-10 - 0-09	Éire Óg	Ballinlough
	G Lewis 0-2, P Cahill 0-2, P O'Shea 0-2, J Lewis 0-1, M O'Driscoll 0-1, D Motherway 0-1, M Lynch 0-1.		M Sheehan 0-4, P O'Flynn 0-3, D Desmond 0-1, P Bradley 0-1.

=== Second round ===
16 May 1992 Second round	Ballymartle	3-12 - 2-05	Blackrock	Riverstick
	T Allen 2-1, M Fitzpatrick 0-6, C Deasy 1-2, J O'Mahony 0-2, P Deasy 0-1.		K Cummins 2-0, J Smith 0-3, B Smith 0-2.

16 May 1992 Second round	Midleton	3-07 - 3-07	Bishopstown	Erin's Own Grounds
	E Murphy 1-2, B Gleeson 1-1, K Roche 1-0, N O'Neill 0-3, W Wallace 0-2.		D O'Mahony 1-1, C Coffey 1-0, M Lyons 1-0, J Ryan 0-3, A O'Sullivan 0-3.

23 May 1992 Second round	Glen Rovers	1-08 - 1-13	Kilbrittain	Riverstick
	B McGuckin 1-0, M Murphy 0-2, D Whitley 0-2, P Barry 0-2, K Dorgan 0-1, K Fitzgibbon 0-1.		T Brennan 0-4, D O'Connell 0-4, C O'Connell 1-0, D Healy 0-3, T McCarthy 0-1, P Harrington 0-1.

13 June 1992 Second round	St. Vincent's	0-13 - 0-18	Na Piarsaigh	Kilbarry
	W Leahy 0-5, J Gould 0-3, W McCarthy 0-2, J Leahy 0-1, D Murphy 0-1, J Ryan 0-1.		B O'Sullivan 0-7, R Dalton 0-3, G Daly 0-2, N Greaney 0-2, J O'Meara 0-2, L Martin 0-1, C O'Donovan 0-1.

24 June 1992 Second round	Aghabullogue	3-09 - 1-13	St. Finbarr's	Ovens
	K Barry-Murphy 2-1, P Martin 0-5, T Ó Murchú 1-0, N Looney 0-2, D O'Connell 0-1.		F Lehane 0-6, C Mahony 1-0, C Ryan 0-3, F O'Brien 0-2, M Quaid 0-2.

27 June 1992 Second round replay	Midleton	1-06 - 4-14	Bishopstown	Erin's Own Grounds
	B Gleeson 1-2, K McCarthy 0-3, M Corcoran 0-1.		D O'Mahony 1-4, E Farrell 1-2, J Ryan 1-2, T Keating 1-1, A O'Sullivan 0-2, C Coffey 0-1, V Murray 0-1, B Murphy 0-1.

3 July 1992 Second round	Cloyne	1-10 - 1-07	Youghal	Castlemartyr
	P Cahill 0-4, G Lewis 1-0, M Cahill 0-1, P O'Shea 0-1, M O'Driscoll 0-1, J Lewis 0-1, J Cowhig 0-1, D Motherway 0-1.		F O'Sullivan 1-0, M Walsh 0-2, E Coleman 0-2, A Murphy 0-2, T O'Connell 0-1.

12 July 1992 Second round	Mallow	4-14 - 2-09	Delanys	Grenagh
	F McCormack 2-4, R Sheehan 1-3, R O'Connell 0-6, R Glynn 1-0, J Hayes 0-1.		B Egan 0-5, D McElhinney 1-1, L Foley 1-0, M McElhinney 0-2, M Moynihan 0-1.

26 July 1992 Second round	St. Catherine's	0-12 - 2-05	Douglas	Páirc Shéamuis de Barra
	C Clancy 0-7, D Walsh 0-2, C Casey 0-1, K Morrison 0-1, S Neville 0-1.		F Bermingham 2-0, M Twomey 0-3, D Larkin 0-1, C Toal 0-1.

=== Quarter-finals ===
12 July 1992 Quarter-final	Bishopstown	1-21 - 0-05	Aghabullogue	Ballincollig
	D O'Mahony 0-6, V Murray 0-4, R O'Doherty 1-0, J Ryan 0-3, E Farrell 0-3, M O'Connor 0-2, C Coffey 0-1, L Meaney 0-1, N Crowley 0-1.		P Martin 0-3, N Looney 0-2.

12 July 1992 Quarter-final	Kilbrittain	4-11 - 0-13	Na Piarsaigh	Riverstick
	T Brennan 1-2, G O'Connell 1-2, T McCarthy 1-1, D O'Connell 0-4, C O'Connell 1-0, D Healy 0-2.		J O'Meara 0-4, R Dalton 0-3, G Maguire 0-2, M Kearney 0-1, N Greaney 0-1, L Martin 0-1, T Allen 0-1.

26 July 1992 Quarter-final	Cloyne	2-08 - 1-07	Mallow	Carrignavar
	P Cahill 1-5, G Lewis 1-1, A O'Brien 0-1, D Motherway 0-1.		R O'Connell 0-5, J Hayes 1-0, F McCormack 0-1, J O'Mahony 0-1.

12 September 1992 Quarter-final	Ballymartle	2-07 - 0-10	St. Catherine's	Erin's Own Grounds
	P Deasy 1-3, P O'Mahony 1-0, J O'Mahony 0-1, T Allen 0-1, K McCarthy 0-1, E McCarthy 0-1.		C Clancy 0-4, D Walsh 0-3, D O'Leary 0-1, K Morrison 0-1, C Casey 0-1.

=== Semi-finals ===
15 August 1992 Semi-final	Bishopstown	1-16 - 0-10	Kilbrittain	Jack Barrett Park
	D O'Mahony 0-5, J Ryan 0-4, E O'Farrell 0-4, N Crowley 1-0, M O'Connor 0-1, V Murray 0-1, M Lyons 0-1.		T Brennan 0-4, D O'Connell 0-2, D O'Neill 0-2, T McCarthy 0-1, D Healy 0-1.

11 October 1992 Semi-final	Cloyne	2-08 - 1-08	Ballymartle	Páirc Uí Chaoimh
	P Cahill 1-4, G Lewis 1-1, P O'Shea 0-2, M Cahill 0-1.		C Deasy 1-2, P O'Mahony 0-2, P Deasy 0-1, G Cummins 0-1, M Fitzpatrick 0-1, M Sheehan 0-1.

=== Final ===
25 October 1992 Final	Bishopstown	1-09 - 0-09	Cloyne	Ballincollig Sportsfield
	E Farrell 0-4, T Keating 1-0, D O'Mahony 0-2, R O'Doherty 0-2, J Ryan 0-1.		P Cahill 0-4, G O'Shea 0-3, G Lewis 0-1, A O'Brien 0-1.

== Championship statistics ==
=== Top scorers ===
Overall

Rank	Player	Club	Tally	Total	Matches	Average
1	Philip Cahill	Cloyne	2-19	25	5	5.00
2	Donal O'Mahony	Bishopstown	2-18	24	5	4.80
3	Christy Clancy	St. Catherine's	0-19	19	3	6.33
4	Ray O'Connell	Mallow	0-17	17	3	5.66
5	Eoin O'Farrell	Bishopstown	1-13	16	4	4.00
6	Barry Egan	Delanys	1-12	15	2	7.50
7	Ger Lewis	Mallow	3-05	14	5	2.80
7	Ronan Sheehan	Mallow	2-08	14	3	4.66
9	Tom Brennan	Kilbrittain	1-10	13	3	4.33
10	Ger Manley	Inniscarra	3-03	12	1	12.00
10	Fergal McCormack	Mallow	2-06	12	3	4.00

In a single game

Rank	Player	Club	Tally	Total	Opposition
1	Ger Manley	Inniscarra	3-03	12	Delanys
2	Fergal McCormack	Mallow	2-04	10	Delanys
2	Barry Egan	Delanys	1-07	10	Inniscarra
4	Mark McElhinney	Delanys	2-03	9	Inniscarra
4	Kevin Murray	Cloughduv	1-06	9	St. Catherine's
6	Ronan Sheehan	Mallow	1-05	8	Ballincollig
6	Philip Cahill	Cloyne	1-05	8	Mallow
6	Christy Clancy	St. Catherine's	0-08	8	Cloughduv
9	Tom Allen	Ballymartle	2-01	7	Blackrock
9	Kevin Barry-Murphy	Aghabullogue	2-01	7	St. Finbarr's
9	Donal O'Mahony	Bishopstown	1-04	7	Midleton
9	Philip Cahill	Cloyne	1-04	7	Ballymartle
9	Brian O'Sullivan	Na Piarsaigh	0-07	7	St. Vincent's
9	Christy Clancy	St. Catherine's	0-07	7	Douglas
