= 2003 Cork Intermediate Hurling Championship =

Irish hurling competition

- Dates: 27 April 2003 – 26 October 2003
- Teams: 25
- Sponsor: Permanent TSB
- Champions: Bride Rovers (1st title); Seán Ryan (captain); Jack Russell (manager)
- Runners-up: Inniscarra; John Carey (captain); Tony Hegarty (manager)

Tournament statistics
- Matches played: 42
- Goals scored: 109 (2.6 per match)
- Points scored: 912 (21.71 per match)
- Top scorer(s): Eoin Coleman (0-31)

The 2003 Cork Intermediate Hurling Championship was the 94th staging of the Cork Intermediate Hurling Championship since its establishment by the Cork County Board in 1909. The draw for the opening fixtures took place on 8 December 2002. The championship began on 27 April 2003 and ended on 26 October 2003.

On 26 October 2003, Bride Rovers won the championship after a 1–15 to 1–05 defeat of Inniscarra in the final at Páirc Uí Chaoimh. It remains their only championship title in the grade.

Youghal's Eoin Coleman was the championship's top scorer with 0-31.

== Team changes ==
=== To Championship ===
Promoted from the Cork Junior A Hurling Championship

- Ballinhassig

Regraded from the Cork Senior Hurling Championship

- Ballincollig

=== From Championship ===
Promoted to the Cork Senior Hurling Championship

- Delanys

== Results ==
=== Preliminary round ===
| 27 April 2003 Preliminary round | Aghabullogue | 1-13 - 3-03 | Ballymartle | Cloughduv |
| | D Twomey 1-5, P Kelleher 0-4, P O'Rourke 0-2, J Kelleher 0-1, E Twomey 0-1. | | G Cummins 2-1, J O'Mahony 1-0, R Dwyer 0-2. |

=== First round ===
| 27 April 2003 First round | Blarney | 2-05 - 0-13 | Bride Rovers | Watergrasshill |
| | R McNamara 1-1, A Shanahan 0-4, J Hurley 1-0. | | B Hazelwood 0-9, T Broderick 0-2, P Murphy 0-1, J O'Driscoll 0-1. |

| 3 May 2003 First round | Newcestown | 0-16 - 2-09 | Nemo Rangers | St. Mary's Park |
| | A O'Sullivan 0-10, B O'Donovan 0-2, P Condon 0-2, C O'Donovan 0-1, P Kenneally 0-1. | | J Masters 1-5, S Calnan 1-0, A Cronin 0-3, P Morgan 0-1. |

| 3 May 2003 First round | St. Vincent's | 2-09 - 1-13 | Milford | Croke Memorial Park |
| | F Murphy 1-1, A Buckley 0-4, C Barry 1-0, B Barry 0-1, T Hornibrook 0-1, D McCarthy 0-1, C Hartnett 0-1. | | M Morrissey 1-9, J Cremin 0-2, A Sexton 0-1, N Geary 0-1. |

| 5 May 2003 First round | Courcey Rovers | 2-09 - 0-11 | Valley Rovers | Carrigaline |
| | N Murphy 0-6, S Hayes 1-1, M O'Donovan 1-0, S Twomey 0-2. | | R Butler 0-4, J Hurley 0-3, B Canty 0-2, A Quirke 0-1, M O'Brien 0-1. |

| 5 May 2003 First round | Bandon | 2-14 - 2-11 | Bishopstown | Ballinhassig |
| | D Lucey 2-2, J Nyhan 0-7, J Burke 0-2, D Burke 0-1, T Bambury 0-1, J Hickey 0-1. | | D O'Mahony 1-6, E McCarthy 1-1, R Conway 0-3, B Healy 0-1. |

| 8 May 2003 First round | Ballinhassig | 1-18 - 2-11 | Carrigtwohill | Páirc Uí Chonaill |
| | J Mullaney 0-11, M Ahern 1-2, J O'Sullivan 0-2, T Coleman 0-2, D Duggan 0-1. | | D Healy 1-5, J Barrett 1-4, Séamus O'Farrell 0-1, Seán O'Farrell 0-1. |

| 10 May 2003 First round | Inniscarra | 1-11 - 3-04 | Mallow | Church Road |
| | D O'Riordan 0-6, D Holland 1-1, S Holland 0-3, J O'Mahony 0-1. | | R O'Connell 1-3, S Leahy 1-0, J Hayes 1-0, J Walsh 0-1. |

| 10 May 2003 First round | Aghada | 2-13 - 2-10 | Youghal | Castlemartyr |
| | V Morrissey 1-4, D Creedon 1-1, T O'Keeffe 0-3, P O'Neill 0-3, B Morrissey 0-2. | | M Ó Laochdha 2-0, E Coleman 0-5, B Coleman 0-2, Brendan Ring 0-2, J Grace 0-1. |

| 10 May 2003 First round | Cobh | 1-11 - 2-14 | Ballymartle | Páirc Shéamuis de Barra |
| | P Sloane 1-3, G Meaney 0-3, B Ahern 0-2, J Griffin 0-1, R Meaney 0-1, D Barrett 0-1. | | J Tobin 2-1, B Dwyer 0-6, G Cummins 0-3, D McCarthy 0-1, A McCarthy 0-1, R Dwyer 0-1, F Murphy 0-1. |

| 10 May 2003 First round | Éire Óg | 2-12 - 0-18 | Tracton | Páirc Liam Mhic Cárthaigh |
| | T Cronin 0-7, J Crowley 1-2, M Long 1-0, N Brennan 0-1, B O'Neill 0-1, J Malone 0-1. | | S O'Sullivan 0-5, K Lynch 0-5, M Kingston 0-2, N Collins 0-2, H Sisk 0-1, P Kingston 0-1, M Desmond 0-1, D Walsh 0-1. |

| 11 May 2003 First round | Glen Rovers | 2-11 - 1-09 | Ballincollig | Ballinora |
| | C O'Keeffe 1-1, S Hackett 0-4, N Harte 1-0, K McCarthy 0-2, L Galvin 0-2, P O'Riordan 0-1, D Goggin 0-1. | | D Beale 1-5, P Ryan 0-1, F Kelly 0-1, M O'Brien 0-1, R O'Doherty 0-1. |

| 16 May 2003 First round replay | Éire Óg | 1-07 - 0-12 | Tracton | Páirc Liam Mhic Cárthaigh |
| | N Brennan 1-1, T Cronin 0-3, K Sheehan 0-2, D Crowley 0-1. | | K Lynch 0-6, S O'Sullivan 0-4, H Sisk 0-1, M Kingston 0-1. |

| 17 May 2003 First round | Kilbrittain | 1-08 - 0-11 | St. Finbarr's | Jack Barrett Park |
| | A Harrington 1-0, V O'Brien 0-3, D O'Connell 0-2, J O'Brien 0-1, DP Hickey 0-1, D Hickey 0-1. | | K Kelleher 0-8, P McSweeney 0-2, V Cooney 0-1. |

| 23 May 2003 First round replay | Kilbrittain | 0-10 - 1-09 | St. Finbarr's | Jack Barrett Park |
| | D O'Connell 0-7, F Hickey 0-1, E Sheehy 0-1, D McSweeney 0-1. | | G O'Regan 1-2, K Kelleher 0-5, R O'Mahony 0-1, P McSweeney 0-1. |

=== Second round ===
| 17 May 2003 Second round | St. Vincent's | 2-09 - 2-13 | Mallow |
| | A Buckley 0-6, S Rea 1-1, B Barry 1-0, D O'Callaghan 0-1, D McCarthy 0-1. | | J Hayes 2-1, R O'Connell 0-4, A Ahern 0-2, R Sheehan 0-2, R Galvin 0-2, J Walsh 0-1, B Carey 0-1. |

| 17 May 2003 Second round | Bishpstown | 1-08 - 3-02 | Nemo Rangers | Brinny Sportsfield |
| | D O'Mahony 1-4, S O'Neill 0-2, J Murphy 0-1, K Coughlan 0-1. | | A Cronin 2-0, S Calanan 1-1, P Morgan 0-1. |

| 23 May 2003 Second round replay | Bishpstown | 1-14 - 1-10 | Nemo Rangers | Brinny Sportsfield |
| | D O'Mahony 0-6, N Fehilly 1-0, J Murphy 0-3, A Corbett 0-2, R Conway 0-1, S O'Neill 0-1, C Doyle 0-1. | | J Masters 1-4, A Cronin 0-3, S Calnan 0-2, J Coogan 0-1. |

| 23 May 2003 Second round | Ballincollig | 0-16 - 2-12 | Carrigtwohill | Riverstown Sportsfield |
| | F Kelly 0-7, R Ryan 0-6, J Dwyer 0-2, T O'Leary 0-1. | | Seán O'Farrell 2-1, D Healy 0-6, Séamus O'Farrell 0-2, P McCarthy 0-1, J Barrett 0-1, M Fitzgerald 0-1. |

| 24 May 2003 Second round | Valley Rovers | 3-14 - 1-11 | Éire Óg | Cloughduv |
| | M Collins 1-2, J Hurley 0-5, A Quirke 1-1, R Fleming 1-0, E Manning 0-2, B Canty 0-2, K Collins 0-1, R Butler 0-1. | | T Cronin 1-5, P Coakley 0-2, N Brennan 0-2, K Sheehan 0-1, P O'Flynn 0-1. |

| 31 May 2003 Second round | Youghal | 1-16 - 1-12 | Cobh | Killeagh |
| | E Coleman 0-7, B Coleman 0-4, JP Joyce 1-0, D Ring 0-2, J Grace 0-1, M Ó Loachadha 0-1, M Downing 0-1. | | P Slaone 0-6, B Meaney 1-0, D Barrett 0-2, M Daly 0-2, R Meaney 0-1, O O'Connell 0-1. |

| 21 June 2003 Second round | Kilbrittain | 1-11 - 2-04 | Blarney | Cloughduv |
| | A Hayes 1-0, E Sheehy 0-3, M Holland 0-2, D O'Connell 0-1, J O'Brien 0-1, D Deasy 0-1, O Sexton 0-1, J Deasy 0-1, P Sexton 0-1. | | A Shanahan 2-4. |

=== Third round ===
| 21 June 2003 Third round | Mallow | 2-09 - 3-09 | Bride Rovers | Ballyhooly |
| | P Dineen 0-7, T O'Riordan 1-1, R Galvin 1-0, F McCormack 0-1. | | S Ryan 1-1, D Ryan 1-1, Brian Murphy 1-0, J O'Driscoll 0-2, B Hazelwood 0-2, T Broderick 0-1, M Hogan 0-1, B Murphy 0-1. |

| 28 June 2003 Third round | Courcey Rovers | 2-10 - 1-11 | Aghada | Páirc Uí Chaoimh |
| | M O'Donovan 1-2, J Murphy 1-2, N Murphy 0-4, S Twomey 0-1, K Moloney 0-1. | | V Morrissey 0-8, S O'Keeffe 1-1, G Melvin 0-1, T O'Keeffe 0-1. |

| 4 July 2003 Third round | Tracton | 0-13 - 1-10 | Valley Rovers | Páirc Uí Ríogáin |
| | D Walsh 0-3, K Lynch 0-3, S O'Sullivan 0-3, N Collins 0-2, P Kingston 0-1, F Lynch 0-1. | | K Canty 1-0, R Butler 0-3, B Canty 0-3, J Hurley 0-2, E Manning 0-1, R Fleming 0-1. |

| 5 July 2003 Third round | Carrigtwohill | 0-16 - 2-09 | Newcestown | Páirc Uí Rinn |
| | D Healy 0-7, J Barrett 0-3, M Fitzgerald 0-2, Séamus O'Farrell 0-1, Seán O'Farrell 0-1, M Foley 0-1, N McCarthy 0-1. | | P Condon 1-2, B O'Donovan 1-2, A O'Sullivan 0-3, F O'Sullivan 0-1, D Desmond 0-1. |

| 5 July 2003 Third round | Inniscarra | 2-13 - 1-07 | Ballymartle | Páirc Uí Rinn |
| | D O'Riordan 2-10, D Holland 0-1, M O'Sullivan 0-1, D O'Connell 0-1. | | G Cummins 0-4, J Tobin 1-0, A McCarthy 0-1, E O'Connor 0-1, P Coughlan 0-1. |

| 5 July 2003 Third round | Youghal | 2-16 - 0-10 | Bandon | Carrigaline |
| | E Coleman 0-10, M Ó Laochdha 1-4, Brendan Ring 1-0, D Ring 0-1, B Coleman 0-1. | | J Hickey 0-3, J Burke 0-2, D Burke 0-2, J O'Regan 0-1, A Johnson 0-1, J Nyhan 0-1. |

| 6 July 2003 Third round | Kilbrittain | 1-11 - 2-19 | Ballinhassig | Charlie Hurley Park |
| | E Sheehy 0-5, A Hayes 1-1, Daniel Hickey 0-2, V O'Brien 0-1, O Sexton 0-1, D McSweeney 0-1. | | S Dineen 0-5, D O'Sullivan 0-5, T Coleman 1-1, M Coleman 1-1, J O'Sullivan 0-2, M Ahern 0-2, J Mullaney 0-2, B Lombard 0-1. |

| 13 July 2003 Third round replay | Tracton | 1-09 - 0-10 | Valley Rovers | Páirc Uí Ríogáin |
| | M Ormond 1-0, K Lynch 0-2, F Lynch 0-2, M Kinsgton 0-2, S O'Sullivan 0-1, H Sisk 0-1, F Walsh 0-1. | | E Manning 0-3, J Hurley 0-3, R Butler 0-2, M Kelleher 0-1, B Canty 0-1. |

| 18 July 2003 Third round | Milford | 0-09 - 0-07 | Glen Rovers | Páirc Uí Shíocháin |
| | M Morrissey 0-4, J Cremin 0-3, E Dillon 0-1, R Geary 0-1. | | S Hackett 0-3, N Harte 0-2, S O'Brien 0-1, N Horgan 0-1. |

| 20 July 2003 Third round | Bishopstown | 1-11 - 1-09 | St. Finbarr's | Ballinlough |
| | E McCarthy 1-2, D O'Mahony 0-5, J Murphy 0-2, S O'Neill 0-1, C Murphy 0-1. | | D O'Regan 1-1, B O'Driscoll 0-2, R McCarthy 0-2, S Barry 0-1, A Furey 0-1, P O'Callaghan 0-1, R O'Mahony 0-1. |

- Aghabullogue received a bye in this round.

=== Fourth round ===
| 22 July 2003 Fourth round | Ballinhassig | 0-15 - 1-05 | Tracton | Shanbally |
| | M Ahern 0-4, S Dineen 0-2, J Mullaney 0-2, D O'Sullivan 0-2, M Coleman 0-2, B O'Sullivan 0-1, D Dineen 0-1, T Coleman 0-1. | | K Lynch 0-4, F Walsh 1-0, M Kingston 0-1. |

| 27 July 2003 Fourth round | Aghabullogue | 1-12 - 2-08 | Courcey Rovers | Páirc Uí Chaoimh |
| | F Foley 1-6, D O'Leary 0-3, D Murphy 0-1, D Twomey 0-1, J Kelleher 0-1. | | J Murphy 2-2, N Murphy 0-4, S Hayes 0-2. |

=== Quarter-finals ===
| 23 August 2003 Quarter-final | Aghabullogue | 0-14 - 0-11 | Ballinhassig | Ballincollig |
| | F Foley 0-7, D O'Leary 0-3, S Twomey 0-1, D Kiely 0-1, J Foley 0-1, P Kelleher 0-1. | | D Dineen 0-5, J Mullaney 0-2, M Coleman 0-1, J Holland 0-1, S Dineen 0-1, D McCarthy 0-1. |

| 21 September 2003 Quarter-final | Youghal | 1-16 - 1-10 | Bishopstown | St. Catherine's Park |
| | B Ring 1-3, D Ring 0-5, E Coleman 0-4, B Coleman 0-2, C Coleman 0-1, Barry Ring 0-1. | | S O'Neill 0-4, D O'Mahony 1-0, P Condon 0-1, R Conway 0-1, C Murphy 0-1, E McCarthy 0-1, N Fehily 0-1, J Murphy 0-1. |

| 27 September 2003 Quarter-final | Bride Rovers | 4-15 - 0-08 | Milford | Páirc Uí Chaoimh |
| | P Walsh 1-3, J O'Driscoll 1-2, B Murphy 1-2, S Ryan 1-2, B Hazelwood 0-5, P Cotter 0-1. | | N Morrissey 0-6, R Geary 0-1, N Geary 0-1. |

| 4 October 2003 Quarter-final | Inniscarra | 3-12 - 2-14 | Carrigtwohill | Páirc Uí Rinn |
| | S Holland 1-1, D O'Connell 1-1, D Holland 0-4, M O'Regan 1-0, J Hogan 0-3, D O'Riordan 0-1, P O'Riordan 0-1, M O'Sullivan 0-1. | | D Healy 1-2, Seán O'Farrell 1-1, N McCarthy 0-4, M Fitzgerald 0-3, J Barrett 0-3, Séamus O'Farrell 0-1. |

=== Semi-finals ===
| 4 October 2003 Semi-final | Bride Rovers | 1-08 - 0-11 | Youghal | St. Catherine's Park |
| | P Cotter 1-0, B Hazelwood 0-2, P Walsh 0-2, P Murphy 0-1, M Hogan 0-1, S Ryan 0-1, D Ryan 0-1. | | E Coleman 0-4, B Ring 0-2, JP Joyce 0-2, C Coleman 0-1, D Ring 0-1, A Geary 0-1. |

| 11 October 2003 Semi-final replay | Bride Rovers | 2-14 - 1-07 | Youghal | St. Catherine's Park |
| | P Cotter 1-1, S Ryan 0-4, D Ryan 1-0, B Hazelwood 0-3, T Broderick 0-2, J O'Driscoll 0-2, M Hogan 0-1, P Walsh 0-1. | | B Ring 1-1, B Coleman 0-1, J Grace 0-1, JP Joyce 0-1, P Ó Laocha 0-1, D Ring 0-1, E Coleman 0-1. |

| 12 October 2003 Semi-final | Inniscarra | 3-09 - 3-08 | Aghabullogue | Páirc Uí Chaoimh |
| | D O'Riordan 1-2, D O'Connell 1-2, J Hogan 1-2, D Holland 0-2, J Carey 0-1. | | F Foley 2-4, J Cummins 1-0 (og), N Buckley 0-1, D Kiely 0-1, D O'Leary 0-1, E Twomey 0-1. |

=== Final ===
| 26 October 2003 Final | Bride Rovers | 1-15 - 1-05 | Inniscarra | Páirc Uí Chaoimh |
| | P Walsh 1-1, J O'Driscoll 0-3, B Hazelwood 0-3, P Murphy 0-2, S Ryan 0-2, T Broderick 0-2, D Ryan 0-1, P Cotter 0-1. | | M O'Sullivan 1-1, D O'Riordan 0-2, P O'Riordan 0-1, D Holland 0-1. | Referee: W Horgan (Bride Rovers) |

== Championship statistics ==
=== Top scorers ===
Overall

| Rank | Player | Club | Tally | Total | Matches | Average |
|---|---|---|---|---|---|---|
| 1 | Eoin Coleman | Youghal | 0-31 | 31 | 6 | 5.16 |
| 2 | Diarmuid O'Riordan | Inniscarra | 3-21 | 30 | 5 | 6.00 |
| 2 | Donal O'Mahony | Bishopstown | 3-21 | 30 | 5 | 6.00 |
| 3 | Finbarr Foley | Aghabullogue | 3-17 | 26 | 3 | 8.66 |
| 3 | Derek Healy | Carrigtwohill | 2-20 | 26 | 4 | 6.50 |
| 4 | Barry Hazelwood | Bride Rovers | 0-24 | 24 | 6 | 4.00 |
| 5 | Michael Morrissey | Milford | 1-19 | 22 | 3 | 7.33 |
| 6 | Kieran Lynch | Tracton | 0-20 | 20 | 5 | 4.00 |
| 7 | Tim Cronin | Éire Óg | 1-15 | 18 | 3 | 6.00 |
| 8 | John Mullaney | Ballinhassig | 0-17 | 17 | 4 | 4.25 |

In a single game

| Rank | Player | Club | Tally | Total | Opposition |
|---|---|---|---|---|---|
| 1 | Diarmuid O'Riordan | Inniscarra | 2-10 | 16 | Ballymartle |
| 2 | Michael Morrissey | Milford | 1-09 | 12 | St. Vincent's |
| 3 | John Mullaney | Ballinhassig | 0-11 | 11 | Carrigtwohill |
| 4 | Adrian Shanahan | Blarney | 2-04 | 10 | Kilbrittain |
| 4 | Finbarr Foley | Aghabullogue | 2-04 | 10 | Inniscarra |
| 4 | Aidan O'Sullivan | Newcestown | 0-10 | 10 | Nemo Rangers |
| 4 | Eoin Coleman | Youghal | 0-10 | 10 | Bandon |
| 5 | Donal O'Mahony | Bishopstown | 1-06 | 9 | Bandon |
| 5 | Finbarr Foley | Aghabullogue | 1-06 | 9 | Courcey Rovers |
| 5 | Barry Hazelwood | Bride Rovers | 0-09 | 9 | Blarney |
