= Michael Cunningham (hurler) =

Irish hurler and Gaelic footballer

Personal information
- Native name: Mícheál Ó Cuinneagáin (Irish)
- Born: 1965 (age 60–61) Emly, County Tipperary, Ireland

Sport
- Sport: Gaelic football
- Position: Centre-forward
Club
- Years: Club
- Emly
Club titles
- Tipperary titles: 0
Inter-county
- Years: County
- 1987-1988: Tipperary
Inter-county titles
- Munster titles: 0
- All-Irelands: 0
- NFL: 0
- All Stars: 0

Michael Cunningham (born 1965) is an Irish former hurler and Gaelic footballer. At club level, he played with Emly and at inter-county level he was a member of the Tipperary senior football team.

== Career ==
At club level, Cunningham played with Emly and had a number of underage successes. He won back-to-back Tipperary MAFC titles in 1982 and 1983, as well as claiming Tipperary U21AFC titles in 1982 and 1985. Cunningham progressed to adult level and won a West Tipperary SFC title after a 1–07 to 1–05 defeat of Arravale Rovers in 1987.

Cunningham first appeared on the inter-county scene with Tipperary during a three-year tenure as a dual player with the minor teams. He won consecutive Munster MHC medals in 1982 and 1983. He was centre-forward when Tipperary beat Galway by 2–07 to 0–04 in the 1982 All-Ireland minor final. Cunningham later spent a few seasons with the under-21 team and won a Munster U21HC title in 1984, before retaining the title the following year. He also won an All-Ireland U21HC medal after a 1–10 to 2–06 defeat of Kilkenny in 1985.

Cunningham was added to Tipperary's junior hurling team in 1986. He spent two seasons with the Tipperary senior football team in 1987 and 1988. Cunningham also won a Munster JHC medal in 1988, before being beaten by Kilkenny in the subsequent All-Ireland junior final.

== Honours ==
Emly

- West Tipperary Senior Football Championship: 1987
- West Tipperary Intermediate Hurling Championship: 1984, 1985
- West Tipperary Intermediate Football Championship: 1983
- Tipperary Under-21 A Football Championship: 1982, 1985
- Tipperary Minor A Football Championship: 1982, 1983

Tipperary

- Munster Junior Hurling Championship: 1988
- All-Ireland Under-21 Hurling Championship: 1985
- Munster Under-21 Hurling Championship: 1984, 1985
- All-Ireland Minor Hurling Championship: 1982
- Munster Minor Hurling Championship: 1982, 1983
