= 1988 All-Ireland Junior Hurling Championship =

All Ireland Champions
- Winners: Kilkenny (7th win)
- Captain: Johnny Ronan
- Manager: Ollie Walsh

All Ireland Runners-up
- Runners-up: Tipperary
- Captain: Martin Bourke
- Manager: Willie Sweeney

Provincial Champions
- Munster: Tipperary
- Leinster: Kilkenny
- Ulster: Monaghan
- Connacht: Not Played

The 1988 All-Ireland Junior Hurling Championship was the 67th staging of the All-Ireland Junior Championship since its establishment by the Gaelic Athletic Association in 1912.

Cork entered the championship as the defending champions, however, they were beaten by Tipperary in the Munster final.

The All-Ireland final was played on 15 July 1988 at O'Moore Park in Portlaoise, between Kilkenny and Tipperary, in what was their first meeting in a final in 58 years. Kilkenny won the match by 1-12 to 0-10 to claim their seventh championship title overall and a first title since 1986.

== Results ==
=== All-Ireland Junior Hurling Championship ===
==== All-Ireland semi-finals ====
3 July 1988 Semi-final	Monaghan	1-05 - 8-23	Kilkenny]	Emmet Park

3 July 1988 Semi-final	Tipperary	3-10 - 3-09	Galway	Páirc Shíleáin

==== All-Ireland final ====
15 July 1988 Final	Kilkenny	1-12 - 0-10	Tipperary	O'Moore Park
