= 1974 Cork Intermediate Football Championship =

- Champions: Bishopstown (1st title)
- Runners-up: Newcestown

The 1974 Cork Intermediate Football Championship was the 39th staging of the Cork Intermediate Football Championship since its establishment by the Cork County Board in 1909. The draw for the opening round fixtures took place on 27 January 1974.

The final was played on 29 September 1974 at the Cloughduv GAA Grounds, between Bishopstown and Newcestown, in what was their first ever meeting in the final. Bishopstown won the match by 1-10 to 1-06 to claim their first ever championship title.

== Results ==
=== Semi-finals ===
21 July 1974 Semi-final	Bishopstown	2-08 - 2-08	Glanmire	Cork Athletic Grounds

23 August 1974 Semi-final replay	Bishopstown	2-14 - 4-08	Glanmire	Cork Athletic Grounds

1 September 1974 Semi-final	Newcestown	2-06 - 0-11	Naomh Abán	Cloughduv Grounds

14 September 1974 Semi-final second replay	Bishopstown	1-08 - 0-05	Glanmire	Cork Athletic Grounds

=== Final ===
29 September 1974 Final	Bishopstown	1-10 - 1-06	Newcestown	Cloughduv Grounds
	J Lynch 0-6, J Crowley 1-0, P Lucey 0-2, T Lucey 0-2.		T Ryan 1-0, F Mackey 0-2, M Fleming 0-2, D Healy 0-2.	Referee: J Dennigan (Fermoy)
