= Donal O'Mahony =

Irish hurling coach

Personal information
- Native name: Dónall Ó Mathúna (Irish)
- Nickname: DOM
- Born: 1974 (age 51–52) Bishopstown, Cork, Ireland
- Occupation: Secondary school teacher

Sport
- Sport: Hurling
- Position: Full-forward
- Football Position: Centre Forward
- Hurling Position: Goalkeeper/ Midfielder / Full Forward
Club
- Years: Club
- Bishopstown
Club titles
- Cork titles: 0
College
- Years: College
- 1992-1996: University College Cork
College titles
- Fitzgibbon titles: 1
Inter-county*
Years	County	Apps (scores)
1993-1994	Cork	0 (0-00)
Inter-county titles
- Munster titles: 0
- All-Irelands: 0
- NHL: 0
- All Stars: 0
- *Inter County team apps and scores correct as of 15:01, 27 July 2018.

Donal O'Mahony (born 1974) is an Irish hurling coach, selector and former hurler and Gaelic footballer. He is currently a selector with the Cork senior hurling team.

== Early life ==
O'Mahony was born in Bishopstown, Cork. His father, Dan O'Mahony, was a prominent hurler with Cloughduv while he played Gaelic football with Kilmurry.

== Playing career ==
=== College ===
O'Mahony first came to prominence as a hurler with St. Finbarr's College in Cork. He played in four consecutive Harty Cup campaigns without success.

=== University ===
As a student at University College Cork, O'Mahony joined the college senior team. In 1996 he was at right wing-forward when University College Cork won the Fitzgibbon Cup after a 3-16 to 0-16 defeat of the University of Limerick in the final.

=== Club ===
O'Mahony joined the Bishopstown club at a young age and played in all grades at juvenile and underage levels. After progressing from street league level he won two county championship medals in the under-12 grade, as well as two Féile na nGael medals in Cork. To this day, Donal still holds the record for the highest ever scored in a singular féile match of 11-11. In 1992, O'Mahony won Cork Minor Championship, Cork Under-21 Championship and City Junior Championship medals with the respective Bishopstown minor, under-21 and junior teams.

On 25 October 1992, O'Mahony was just out of the minor grade when he played in his first hurling championship final at adult level. He scored two points as Bishopstown defeated Cloyne by 1-09 to 0-09 to win the Cork Intermediate Championship.

On 22 October 2006, O'Mahony won a Cork Premier Intermediate Championship medal after being introduced as a substitute in a 0-20 to 1-11 defeat of Carrigtwohill in the final.

=== Inter-county ===
==== Minor and under-21 ====
O'Mahony first played for Cork at minor level in 1990. He was a late replacement in goal on the Cork minor hurling team that won the Munster Championship following a 1-09 to 0-09 defeat of Clare in the final.

After becoming a dual player in 1991, O'Mahony won a Munster medal as a non-playing substitute with the Cork minor football team in 1991 after a two-point defeat of Kerry in the final. On 15 September 1991, he was an unused substitute when he won an All-Ireland medal after a 1-09 to 1-07 defeat of Mayo in the final.

O'Mahony won a second successive Munster medal, his first on the field of play, in 1992 after a 3-06 to 2-07 victory over Kerry in the final.

O'Mahony was still eligible for the minor grade when he replaced Alan Hickey as first-choice goalkeeper on the Cork under-21 hurling team in 1992. He won a Munster medal the following year after a 1-18 to 3-09 defeat of Limerick in the final.

==== Senior ====
O'Mahony made his senior debut for Cork on 14 November 1993, replacing Paul O'Callaghan at half-time in a National League game against Galway at Páirc Uí Chaoimh. He made one other appearance during the league but failed to be included on the Cork panel for the Munster Championship.

== Coaching career ==
In 2015, O'Mahony was added to Kieran Kingston's Cork senior hurling management team. As a goalkeeping coach he worked closely with Anthony Nash and Patrick Collins. On 9 July 2017, O'Mahony was part of the management team that guided Cork to the Munster title following a 1-25 to 1-20 defeat of Clare in the final.

Following John Meyler's appointment as manager of the Cork senior hurling team in 2017, O'Mahony was added to the management team as a selector. On 1 July 2018, the new management team helped Cork to a second successive Munster title following a 2-24 to 3-19 defeat of Clare in the final.

== Career statistics ==
=== Inter-county ===
Team	Year	National League			Munster		All-Ireland		Total	
Team	Year	Division	Apps	Score	Apps	Score	Apps	Score	Apps	Score
Cork	1993-94	Division 1	2	0-00	—		—		2	0-00
Total			2	0-00	—		—		2	0-00

== Honours ==
=== As a player ===
University College Cork

- Fitzgibbon Cup (1): 1996

Bishopstown

- Cork Premier Intermediate Hurling Championship (1): 2006
- Cork Intermediate Hurling Championship (1): 1992
- City Junior A Football Championship (1): 1992
- Cork Under-21 Football Championship (1): 1992
- Cork Minor Football Championship (1): 1992

Cork

- Munster Under-21 Hurling Championship (1): 1993
- All-Ireland Minor Football Championship (1): 1991
- Munster Minor Football Championship (2): 1991, 1992
- Munster Minor Hurling Championship (1): 1990

=== In management ===
Cork

- Munster Senior Hurling Championship: 2017, 2018
- All-Ireland Under-20 Hurling Championship: 2020, 2021
- Munster Under-20 Hurling Championship : 2020, 2021

Sporting positions
Preceded by Pat Ryan	Cork Under-20 Hurling Team Manager; 2021-	Succeeded by Incumbent
