= 1987 Cork Junior A Hurling Championship =

- Dates: 4 October – 1 November 1987
- Teams: 7
- Champions: Cloyne (3rd title); Joe Lewis (captain)
- Runners-up: Ballincollig; Séamus O'Brien (captain)

Tournament statistics
- Matches played: 6
- Goals scored: 30 (5 per match)
- Points scored: 112 (18.67 per match)
- Top scorer(s): Ger Lewis (6-06)

The 1987 Cork Junior A Hurling Championship was the 90th staging of the Cork Junior A Hurling Championship since its establishment by the Cork County Board. The championship ran from 4 October to 1 November 1987.

The final was played on 1 November 1987 at Páirc Uí Chaoimh in Cork, between Cloyne and Ballincollig, in what was their first ever meeting in the final. Cloyne won the match by 6-08 to 3-06 to claim their third championship title overall and a first title in 26 years. Cloyne were not officially confirmed as champions until three weeks later when they won the delayed East Cork JAHC title.

Cloyne's Ger Lewis was the championship's top scorer with 6-06.

== Qualification ==
Division	Championship	Champions
Avondhu	North Cork Junior A Hurling Championship	Fermoy
Carbery	South West Junior A Hurling Championship	Barryroe
Carrigdhoun	South East Junior A Hurling Championship	Tracton
Duhallow	Duhallow Junior A Hurling Championship	Lismire
Imokilly	East Cork Junior A Hurling Championship	Cloyne
Muskerry	Mid Cork Junior A Hurling Championship	Ballincollig
Seandún	City Junior A Hurling Championship	Glen Rovers

== Results ==
=== Quarter-finals ===
4 October 1987 Quarter-final	Tracton	4-08 - 1-09	Fermoy	Riverstown Sportsfield
	J Lyons 2-1, Peter Murphy 1-2, M Cronin 1-0, Pat Murphy 0-3, T Kelly 0-2.		M Hennessy 0-4, S Dennehy 1-0, T Cooney 0-3, W Frawley 0-1, G Murphy 0-1.

10 October 1987 Quarter-final	Cloyne	4-10 - 1-10	Glen Rovers	Clonmult Memorial Park
	G Lewis 2-2, P Cahill 1-2, L Dorgan 1-0, J Lewis 0-3, P O'Shea 0-2, N Horgan 0-1.		P Kennefick 0-5, E McGrath 1-0, D Geaney 0-3, D Whitley 0-1, T Collins 0-1.

11 October 1987 Quarter-final	Lismire	2-12 - 2-08	Barryroe	Cloughduv Grounds
	J O'Connor 0-7, E Collins 1-2, E O'Loughlin 1-1, J Noonan 0-1, M O'Keeffe 0-1.		D Dwyer 1-1, D Madden 1-0, B Whelton 0-2, D McCarthy 0-2, C Madden 0-1, L Murphy 0-1, V O'Donovan 0-1.

=== Semi-finals ===
18 October 1987 Semi-final	Ballincollig	0-08 - 0-07	Tracton	Church Road
	D O'Driscoll 0-2, B McCarthy 0-1, P Hennigan 0-1, D Lucey 0-1, F Daly 0-1, P O'Doherty 0-1, J Lucey 0-1.		Pat Murphy 0-2, P Walsh 0-2, M Cronin 0-1, Peter Murphy 0-1, L Cronin 0-1.

18 October 1987 Semi-final	Cloyne	5-13 - 2-13	Lismire	Castletownroche Grounds
	G Lewis 3-2, D Motherway 1-1, J Lewis 0-4, M Lynch 1-0, P Cahill 0-2, T O'Sullivan 0-2, J Cahill 0-1, P O'Shea 0-1.		J O'Connor 1-9, B McAuliffe 1-0, J Noonan 0-2, E O'Loughlin 0-2.

=== Final ===
1 November 1987 Final	Cloyne	6-08 - 3-06	Ballincollig	Páirc Uí Chaoimh
	P Cahill 4-3, G Lewis 1-2, D Motherway 1-1, J Lewis 0-1, M Lynch 0-1.		D O'Driscoll 1-3, P Hennigan 1-0, T West 1-0, D Lucey 0-1, P O'Doherty 0-1, S O'Brien 0-1.	Referee: D O'Connor (Bishopstown)ec

== Championship statistics ==
=== Top scorers ===
Overall

Rank	Player	County	Tally	Total	Matches	Average
1	Ger Lewis	Cloyne	6-06	24	3	8.00
2	Philip Cahill	Cloyne	5-07	22	3	7.33
3	Johnny O'Connor	Lismire	1-16	19	2	9.50
4	Declan Motherway	Cloyne	2-02	8	3	2.66
4	Denis O'Driscoll	Ballincollig	1-05	8	2	4.00
4	Joe Lewis	Cloyne	0-08	8	3	2.66

In a single game

Rank	Player	Club	Tally	Total	Opposition
1	Philip Cahill	Cloyne	4-03	15	Ballincollig
2	Johnny O'Connor	Lismire	1-09	12	Cloyne
3	Ger Lewis	Cloyne	3-02	11	Lismire
4	Ger Lewis	Cloyne	2-02	8	Glen Rovers
5	John Lyons	Tracton	2-01	7	Fermoy
5	Johnny O'Connor	Lismire	0-07	7	Barryroe
7	Denis O'Driscoll	Ballincollig	1-03	6	Cloyne
8	Peter Murphy	Tracton	1-02	5	Fermoy
8	Philip Cahill	Cloyne	1-02	5	Glen Rovers
8	Eddie Collins	Lismire	1-02	5	Barryroe
8	Ger Lewis	Cloyne	1-02	5	Ballincollig
8	Paul Kennefick	Glen Rovers	0-05	5	Cloyne
