= Philip Cahill =

Irish hurler

Personal information
- Native name: Pilib Ó Cathail (Irish)
- Born: November 1966 (age 59–60) Cloyne, County Cork, Ireland

Sport
- Sport: Hurling
- Position: Full-forward
Clubs
Years	Club	Apps (scores)
1984-2008 1985-1997	Cloyne → Imokilly	35 (6-17); 29 (12-52)
Club titles
- Cork titles: 1
Inter-county
Years	County	Apps (scores)
1987-1989	Cork	0 (0-00)
Inter-county titles
- Munster titles: 0
- All-Irelands: 0
- NHL: 0
- All Stars: 0

Philip Cahill (born November 1966) is an Irish former hurler. At club level he played with Cloyne, divisional side Imokilly and at inter-county level was a member of the Cork senior hurling team. Cahill usually lined out as a forward.

== Career ==
Cahill first played hurling and Gaelic football at juvenile and underage levels with the Cloyne club. He subsequently spent 25 seasons as a player at adult level with the club and won several divisional titles as a dual player as well as a Cork JAHC title in 1987 and a Cork IHC title in 1997. He also earned selection with the Imokilly divisional team and secured the full set of county winners' medals by claiming a Cork SHC title in 1997. Cahill was also part of the Cloyne senior team that lost three consecutive county finals from 2004 to 2006.

Cahill first appeared on the inter-county scene during an unsuccessful tenure with the Cork minor and under-21 teams. He progressed onto the Cork junior hurling team and was part of the All-Ireland JHC-winning team in 1987. Cahill made a number of National Hurling League appearances with the Cork senior hurling team between 1987 and 1989, however, he was never selected for the championship team. He ended his inter-county career as part of the Cork intermediate hurling team that beat Galway in the 1997 All-Ireland intermediate final.

== Career statistics ==
Team	Year	National League			Munster		All-Ireland		Total	
Team	Year	Division	Apps	Score	Apps	Score	Apps	Score	Apps	Score
Cork	1987-88	Division 1	5	0-00	—		—		5	0-00
Cork	1988-89	Division 2	3	0-01	—		—		3	0-01
Career total			8	0-01	—		—		8	0-01

== Honours ==
Cloyne

- Cork Intermediate Hurling Championship: 1997
- Cork Junior A Hurling Championship: 1987
- East Cork Junior A Football Championship: 2001
- East Cork Junior A Hurling Championship: 1986, 1987

Imokilly

- Cork Senior Hurling Championship: 1997

Cork

- All-Ireland Intermediate Hurling Championship: 1997
- Munster Intermediate Hurling Championship: 1997
- All-Ireland Junior Hurling Championship: 1987
- Munster Junior Hurling Championship: 1987, 1992
