= Patrick Cronin (hurler) =

Irish hurler (born 1987)

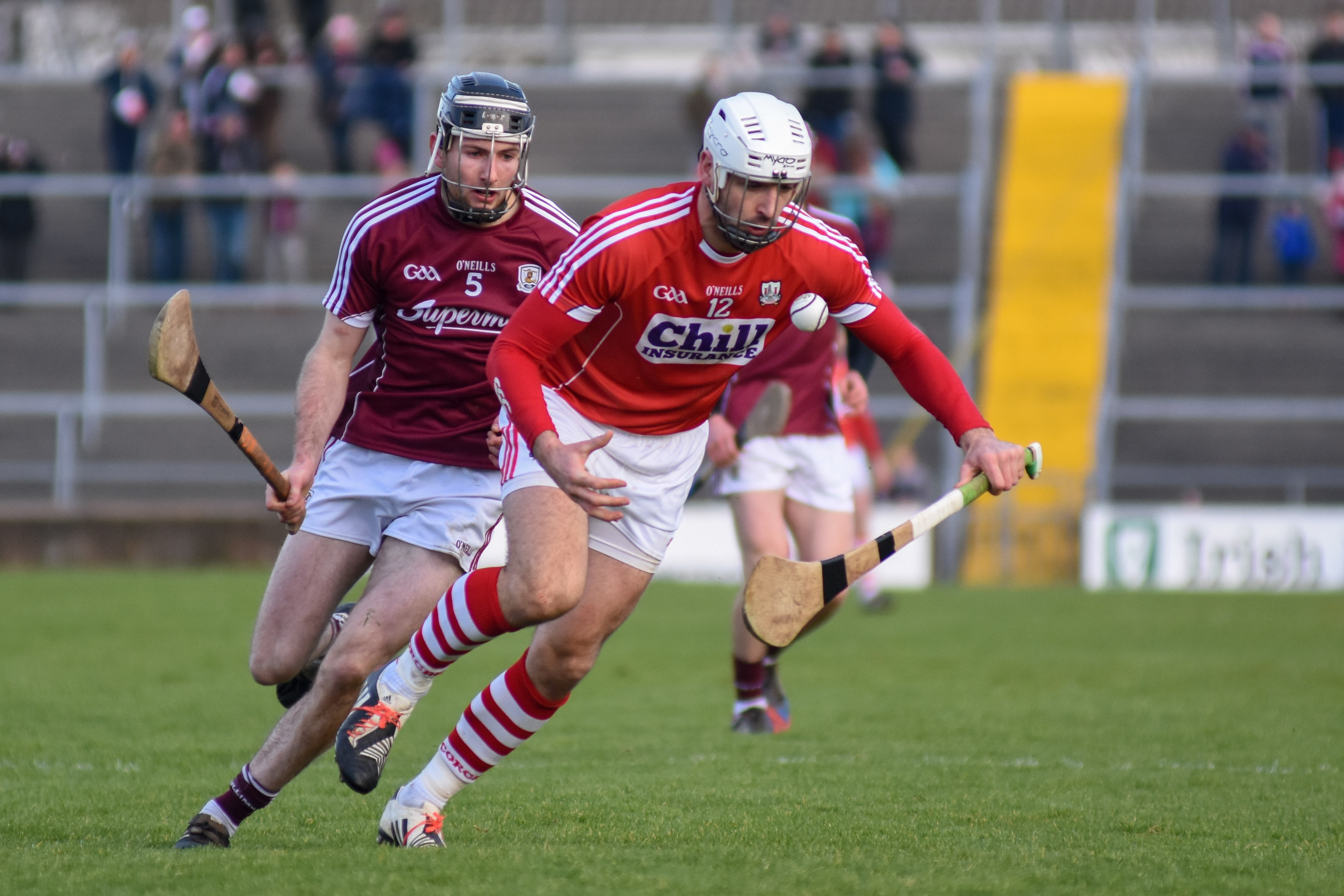
- Patrick Cronin (middle) in action for Cork against Pádraic Mannion (left) of Galway 2016 National Hurling League at Pearse Stadium

Personal information
- Native name: Pádraig Ó Cróinín (Irish)
- Nickname: Pa
- Born: 20 May 1987 (age 39) Ballincollig, County Cork, Ireland
- Occupation: Secondary school teacher
- Height: 6 ft 3 in (191 cm)

Sport
- Sport: Hurling
- Position: Centre-forward
Club*
Years	Club	Apps (scores)
2004-2022	Bishopstown	51 (8-262)
Club titles
- Cork titles: 0
College(s)
- Years: College
- University College Cork; University of Limerick
College titles
- Fitzgibbon titles: 1
Inter-county**
Years	County	Apps (scores)
2006-2016	Cork	40 (4-39)
Inter-county titles
- Munster titles: 2
- All-Irelands: 0
- NHL: 0
- All Stars: 0
- * club appearances and scores correct as of 23:30, 11 March 2021. **Inter County team apps and scores correct as of 16:19, 28 November 2019.

Patrick Cronin (born 20 May 1987) is an Irish hurler who plays for Premier Senior Championship club Bishopstown. He played for the Cork senior hurling team for 10 years, during which time he usually lined out at midfield or as a centre-forward.

Cronin began his hurling career at club level with Bishopstown. After a hugely successful underage career, he broke onto the club's top adult team as a 17-year-old in 2004 and enjoyed his greatest success in 2006 when the club won the Premier Intermediate Championship and promotion to the top flight of Cork hurling. Cronin has made over 50 championship appearances in three two grades of adult hurling for the club, while his early prowess also saw him selected for University College Cork and the University of Limerick, with whom he won a Fitzgibbon Cup title.

At inter-county level, Cronin was part of the successful Cork minor team that won back-to-back Munster Championships in 2004 and 2005 before later winning a Munster Championship with the under-21 team in 2007. He joined the Cork senior team in 2006. From his debut, Cronin was ever-present at midfield or centre-forward and made a combined total of 81 National League and Championship appearances in a career that ended with his last game in 2015. During that time he was part of two Munster Championship-winning teams and was an All-Ireland runner-up as captain of the team in 2013. Cronin's inter-county career came to an end when he was released from the Cork panel in April 2016.

Cronin was nominated for a GAA/GPA All-Star in 2013. At inter-provincial level, he was selected to play in two championship campaigns with Munster, with his sole Railway Cup medal being won in 2013.

== Playing career ==
=== University College Cork ===
As a student at University College Cork, Cronin immediately became involved in hurling by becoming a member of the university's freshers' team. He later lined out the college's senior team in the Fitzgibbon Cup.

=== University of Limerick ===
On 26 February 2011, Cronin lined out at centre-forward when the University of Limerick faced the Limerick Institute of Technology in the Fitzgibbon Cup final. Cronin scored four points and collected a winners' medal following the 1–17 to 2–11 victory.

=== Bishopstown ===
==== Minor and under-21 ====
Cronin joined the Bishopstown club at a young age and played in all grades at juvenile and underage levels. On 1 November 2003, he was at left wing-forward when Bishopstown faced Newtownshandrum in the Premier County Minor Championship final. Cronin scored 1-02 from play in the 5–15 to 2–09 victory.

On 25 October 2004, Cronin lined out in a second successive Premier County Minor Championship final. He scored four points overall, including two frees, and claimed a second successive winners' medal following a 3–10 to 1–09 defeat of St. Martin's in Kilworth.

After an unsuccessful third year in the minor grade, Cronin subsequently progressed onto the Bishopstown under-21 team. On 28 October 2006, he top scored with six when Bishopstown defeated Newtownshandrum by 1–09 to 1–08 to claim the Premier Under-21 A Championship.

On 3 November 2007, Cronin lined out in a second successive Premier Under-21 A Championship final. He scored five points from midfield and collected a second winners' medal following the 2–13 to 1–11 defeat of Carrigaline

==== Intermediate ====
On 3 July 2004, having just turned seventeen a short while earlier, Cronin made his first appearance for Bishopstown's intermediate team. He scored three points in the 3–10 to 1–09 defeat by Courcey Rovers.

On 22 October 2006, Bishopstown qualified for the Premier Intermediate Championship final against Carrigtwohill. Cronin top scored with 0-09 and claimed a winners' medal following the 0–20 to 1–11 victory. He also ended the championship as top scorer with 3-36. On 16 December 2006, Cronin was again at midfield when Bishopstown faced Clooney-Quin in the Munster final. He was held scoreless and ended the game on the losing side following a 0–14 to 1–08 defeat.

==== Senior ====
On 7 October 2012, Cronin top scored for Bishopstown with 0-06 when the team suffered a 1–15 to 1–13 defeat by Sarsfields in the Cork Senior Championship final. He ended the championship as top scorer with 1-44.

=== Cork ===
==== Minor and under-21 ====
Cronin first played for Cork as a member of the minor team during the 2003 Munster Championship. He made his first appearance for the team as a 15-year-old on 9 April 2003 when he came on as a substitute in Cork's 0–15 to 0–12 defeat of Clare. On 29 June 2003, Cronin was an unused substitute when Cork suffered a 2–12 to 0–16 defeat by Tipperary in the Munster final.

Cronin broke onto the starting fifteen during the 2004 Munster Championship. On 27 June 2004 he scored seven points from right wing-forward when Cork defeated Tipperary by 2–12 to 3–08 to win the Munster Championship.

Cronin was again eligible for the minor grade the following year and was appointed captain of the team. On 26 June 2005, he top scored 1-10 from right corner-forward and collected a second successive Munster Championship medal following Cork's 2–18 to 1–12 defeat of Limerick.

On 12 July 2006, Cronin made his first appearance for the Cork under-21 team when he scored two points in a 3–17 to 2–12 defeat of Waterford. On 8 August 2006, he scored three points from left wing-forward when Cork suffered a 3–11 to 0–13 defeat by Tipperary in the Munster final.

On 2 August 2007, Cronin lined out in a second successive Munster final. He scored two points and ended the game with a winners' medal following the 1–20 to 0–10 defeat of Waterford.

Cronin was appointed captain of the under-21 team in advance of the 2008 Munster Championship. He played his last game in the grade on 20 July 2008 in a 1–20 to 1–11 defeat by Clare.

==== Senior ====
Cronin was added to the Cork senior team at the start of the 2006 season. He was an unused substitute throughout the National League but was retained for the championship. On 25 June 2006, Cronin won a Munster Championship medal as an unused substitute following Cork's 2–14 to 1–14 defeat of Tipperary in the final. Cork subsequently qualified for the All-Ireland final on 3 September 2006, with Kilkenny providing the opposition. Cronin remained on the bench for the 1–16 to 1–13 defeat.

On 18 February 2007, Cronin made his first appearance for the Cork senior team in a 1–21 to 1–14 defeat of Offaly in the National League. He made his Munster Championship debut on 27 May 2007 in Cork's 1–18 to 1-11 Munster quarter-final defeat of Clare.

On 11 July 2010, Cronin was named amongst the substitutes when Cork faced Waterford in the Munster final. He came on as a substitute at left corner-forward for Patrick Horgan when Cork drew the game 2-15 apiece. Cronin returned to the bench for the replay a week later as Cork were defeated by 1–16 to 1–13.

On 6 May 2012, Cronin was named at centre-forward when Cork faced Kilkenny in the National League final. He was held scoreless in the 3–21 to 0–16 defeat.

Cronin was appointed captain at the start of the 2013 season. On 14 July 2013, he captained the team to a 0–24 to 0-15 Munster final defeat by Limerick. On 8 September 2013, Cronin captained the team from left wing-forward against Clare in the All-Ireland final and was one of three goal-scorers in the 3–16 to 0–25 draw. He was again at left wing-forward for the replay on 28 September which Cork lost by 5Cronin 3–16. Bronin ended the year by being nominated for a GAA/GPA All-Star.

Cronin retained the captaincy the following year. On 3 July 2014, he won a second Munster Championship medal - his first on the field of play - following Cork's 2–24 to 0–24 defeat of Limerick in the last final to be played at the old Páirc Uí Chaoimh.

On 3 May 2015, Cronin was named on the bench when Cork qualified for the National League final against Waterford. He remained as an unused substitute for the 1–24 to 0–17 defeat.

Cronin was again included on the Cork team for the 2016 National League but was an unused substitute throughout the campaign. On 5 April 2016, it was reported that Cronin had been released from the Cork team.

=== Munster ===
On 19 February 2012, Cronin was selected for the Munster inter-provincial team for the first time. He scored a point from right wing-forward in the 3–14 to 1–16 defeat by Leinster in the semi-final of the Interprovincial Championship.

Cronin was again selected for the Munster team the following season. On 3 March 2013, he won a Railway Cup medal after scoring three points in Munster's 1–22 to 0–15 defeat of Connacht in the final. <3

== Career statistics ==
=== Club ===
As of match played 28 August 2022.

Team	Year	Cork PIHC	
Team	Year	Apps	Score
Bishopstown	2004	1	0-03
Bishopstown	2005	4	0-23
Bishopstown	2006	6	3-36
Bishopstown	Total	11	3-62
Bishopstown	Year	Cork PSHC	
Bishopstown	Year	Apps	Score
Bishopstown	2007	3	0-21
Bishopstown	2008	3	0-14
Bishopstown	2009	2	0-11
Bishopstown	2010	2	2-06
Bishopstown	2011	6	1-21
Bishopstown	2012	6	1-44
Bishopstown	2013	3	1-09
Bishopstown	2014	2	0-05
Bishopstown	2015	4	1-28
Bishopstown	2016	5	0-23
Bishopstown	2017	3	0-16
Bishopstown	2018	3	0-13
Bishopstown	2019	3	1-22
Bishopstown	2020	4	1-21
Bishopstown	2021	2	0-08
Bishopstown	2022	3	0-27
Bishopstown	Total	54	8-289
Career total		65	11-351

=== Inter-county ===
Team	Year	National League			Munster		All-Ireland		Total	
Team	Year	Division	Apps	Score	Apps	Score	Apps	Score	Apps	Score
Cork Minor	2003	—			1	0-00	—		1	0-00
Cork Minor	2004	—			3	1-22	1	0-07	4	1-29
Cork Minor	2005	—			3	1-19	1	0-02	4	1-21
Cork Minor	Total	—			7	2-41	2	0-09	9	2-50
Cork U21	2006	—			2	0-05	—		2	0-05
Cork U21	2007	—			3	0-14	1	0-07	4	0-21
Cork U21	2008	—			1	0-01	—		1	0-01
Cork U21	Total	—			6	0-20	1	0-07	7	0-27
Cork	2006	Division 1A	0	0-00	0	0-00	0	0-00	0	0-00
Cork	2007	Division 1A	6	0-11	2	2-01	5	1-06	13	3-18
Cork	2008	Division 1A	3	0-12	1	0-00	4	0-03	8	0-15
Cork	2009	Division 1	4	0-04	1	0-02	2	0-01	7	0-07
Cork	2010	Division 1	0	0-00	1	0-00	1	0-00	2	0-00
Cork	2011	Division 1	7	0-06	1	0-01	2	0-00	10	0-07
Cork	2012	Division 1A	7	1-08	1	0-01	4	0-06	12	1-15
Cork	2013	Division 1A	5	1-04	2	0-04	4	1-04	11	2-12
Cork	2014	Division 1B	4	0-02	4	0-00	1	0-00	9	0-02
Cork	2015	Division 1A	2	0-00	1	0-05	3	0-05	6	0-10
Cork	2016	Division 1A	3	0-00	—		—		3	0-00
Cork	Total		41	2-47	14	2-14	26	2-25	81	6-86
Career total			41	2-47	27	4-75	29	2-41	97	8-163

=== Inter-provincial ===
Team	Year	Railway Cup	
Team	Year	Apps	Score
Munster	2012	1	0-01
Munster	2013	2	0-04
Total		3	0-05

== Honours ==
University of Limerick

- Fitzgibbon Cup (1): 2011

Bishopstown

- Cork Premier Intermediate Hurling Championship (1): 2006
- Cork Premier Under-21 A Hurling Championship (2): 2006, 2007
- Cork Premier Minor Hurling Championship (2): 2003, 2004

Cork

- Munster Senior Hurling Championship (2): 2006, 2014 (c)
- Munster Under-21 Hurling Championship (1): 2007
- Munster Minor Hurling Championship (2): 2004, 2005 (c)

Munster

- Railway Cup (1): 2013

Sporting positions
Preceded by Shane O'Neill	Cork Minor Hurling Captain; 2005	Succeeded by Patrick Horgan
Preceded by Shane O'Neill	Cork Under-21 Hurling Captain; 2008	Succeeded by Patrick Horgan
Preceded by Brian Murphy	Cork Senior Hurling Captain; 2013-2014	Succeeded by Anthony Nash
