= 2006 Cork Premier Intermediate Hurling Championship =

- Dates: 7 May 2006 – 22 October 2006
- Teams: 16
- Champions: Bishopstown (1st title); Ronan Conway (captain)
- Runners-up: Carrigtwohill
- Relegated: St. Finbarr's

Tournament statistics
- Matches played: 29
- Goals scored: 64 (2.21 per match)
- Points scored: 725 (25 per match)
- Top scorer(s): Pa Cronin (3-36)

The 2006 Cork Premier Intermediate Hurling Championship was the third staging of the Cork Premier Intermediate Hurling Championship since its establishment by the Cork County Board in 2004. The championship began on 7 May 2006 and ended on 22 October 2006.

On 9 September 2006, St. Finbarr's were relegated from the championship following a 2-21 to 0-02 defeat by Ballincollig in a relegation play-off.

On 22 October 2006, Bishopstown won the championship following a 0-20 to 1-11 defeat of Carrigtwohill in the final. This was their first championship title in the grade.

Bishopstown's Pa Cronin was the championship's top scorer with 3-36.

== Results ==
=== Round 1 ===
7 May 2006 Round 1	Watergrasshill	2-11 - 0-14	Argideen Rangers	Manning Park, Passage
	J Halbert 1-7, P Cahill 1-1, P O'Regan 0-3.		S O'Mahony 0-4, M O'Callaghan 0-3, N Coomey 0-2, B Harte 0-1, D Crowley 0-1, M Walsh 0-1, B Hennessy 0-1, J Murphy 0-1.

5 May 2006 Round 1	Tracton	2-10 - 0-14	Carrigtwohill	Páirc Uí Rinn, Cork
	R Walsh 0-7, K Lynch 1-1, F Walsh 1-1, F Lynch 0-1.		N McCarthy 0-7, Seán O'Farrell 0-2, J Barrett 0-2, N Furlong 0-2, B Lordan 0-1.	Referee: D Copps (Ballyhea)

7 May 2006 Round 1	Aghada	0-13 - 1-10	Bishopstown	Clonmult Memorial Park, Midleton
	T O'Keeffe 0-8, B Morrissey 0-2, V Morrissey 0-1, J Connolly 0-1.		R Conway 1-3, P Cronin 0-3, S O'Neill 0-2, T Murray 0-1, C Doyle 0-1.	Referee: P Downey (Inniscarra)

7 May 2006 Round 1	Blarney	1-13 - 0-09	Courcey Rovers	Newcestown
	J Hurley 1-4, M McCarthy 0-3, S Walsh 0-2, E McCarthy 0-1, C Sheehan 0-1, P Nodwell 0-1, D McSweeney 0-1.		N Murphy 0-7, M O'Donovan 0-1, S Hayes 0-1.	Referee: M Collins (Clonakilty)

13 May 2006 Round 1	Newcestown	1-14 - 1-10	Ballyhea	Ballyanley Sportsfield, Inniscarra
	P Condon 1-2, G O'Driscoll 0-5, P Kenneally 0-2, A O'Sullivan 0-2, C O'Donovan 0-1, N O'Sullivan 0-1, J O'Sullivan 0-1.		N Ronan 1-4, M O'Sullivan 0-3, E Morrissey 0-1, A Crowley 0-1, D Ronan 0-1.	Referee: P Downey (Inniscarra)

14 May 2006 Round 1	St. Finbarr's	0-14 - 0-17	Aghabullogue	Ovens
	E Fitzpatrick 0-3, P Harte 0-3, S Nott 0-2, A Cronin 0-2, T Olden 0-1, T Guiheen 0-1, R O'Dwyer 0-1, N Hosford 0-1.		P Finnegan 0-11, Donal Twomey 0-2, B Kiely 0-2, N Buckley 0-1, D O'Leary 0-1.	Referee: D O'Leary (Watergrasshill)

14 May 2006 Round 1	Youghal	2-12 - 0-12	Inniscarra	Riverstown
	E Coleman 0-8, R Cunningham 1-1, A Murphy 1-0, D Ring 0-2, N Roche 0-1.		N O'Regan 0-6, D O'Connell 0-3, G Burke 0-1, J Olden 0-1, A O'Mahony 0-1.	Referee: P O'Neill (Shamrocks)

26 May 2006 Round 1	Ballincollig	0-10 - 1-12	Mallow	Páirc Eoin Mhic Charthaigh, D'more
	D Beale 0-7, A Beale 0-1, J O'Driscoll 0-1, E Hegarty 0-1.		F McCormack 0-7, P Heffernan 1-0, R Galvin 0-1, T O'Riordan 0-1, C O'Riordan 0-1, M Buckley 0-1, J Hayes 0-1.	Referee: A Cummins (Ballymartle)

11 May 2006 Round 1 replay	Aghada	1-14 - 1-18 (aet)	Bishopstown	Páirc Uí Rinn, Cork
	T O'Keeffe 1-9, V Morrissey 0-2, T Wall 0-2, P O'Neill 0-1.		P Cronin 0-9, K O'Halloran 1-0, R Conway 0-3, T Murray 0-3, M Power 0-2, S O'Neill 0-1.	Referee: P Downey (Inniscarra)

=== Round 2 ===
24 May 2006 Round 2	Aghada	3-10 - 1-19	Courcey Rovers	Páirc Uí Rinn, Cork
	T O'Keeffe 0-8, P O'Neill 2-0, K O'Keeffe 1-1, S O'Neill 0-1.		J Murphy 1-2, M O'Donovan 0-4, N Murphy 0-4, S Hayes 0-3, K Moloney 0-2, V Hurley 0-2, T Lordan 0-1, B Hayes 0-1.	Referee: D O'Leary (Cloughduv)

7 June 2006 Round 2	Argideen Rangers	3-10 - 2-10	Ballyhea	Páirc Uí Rinn, Cork
	M Walsh 2-1, M O'Callaghan 1-3, S O'Mahony 0-5, J Murphy 0-1.		N Ronan 1-5, D Ronan 1-0, I Curtin 0-2, M O'Sullivan 0-2, T Ronan 0-1.	Referee: C McAllister (Midleton)

10 June 2006 Round 2	St. Finbarr's	1-08 - 1-14	Inniscarra	Ballincollig
	P Harte 0-5, P Kennedy 1-0, T Olden 0-2, O Fitzpatrick 0-1.		D O'Connell 1-1, N O'Regan 0-4, S Olden 0-3, A O'Mahony 0-2, J Casey 0-2, L Ryan 0-1, J Olden 0-1.	Referee: D O'Flynn (Fr. O'Neill's)

11 June 2006 Round 2	Carrigtwohill	3-13 - 0-10	Ballincollig	Páirc Uí Rinn, Cork
	Seán O'Farrell 2-1, J Barrett 0-4, N McCarthy 0-4, R White 1-0, F Flannery 0-2, B Lordan 0-1, S Kidney 0-1.		F Kelly 0-5, A Beale 0-2, D Beale 0-1, R O'Doherty 0-1, B Cotter 0-1.

=== Relegation play-offs ===
28 June 2006 Semi-final	Ballyhea	2-18 - 2-07	St. Finbarr's	Dr. Croke Park, Ballyclough
	N Ronan 1-8, I Curtin 1-1, M O'Sullivan 0-4, G Morrissey 0-2, D Ronan 0-1, A Crowley 0-1, I Ronan 0-1.		S Nott 2-0, P Harte 0-5, E Fitzpatrick 0-2.	Referee: C Lane (Banteer)

1 September 2006 Semi-final	Aghada	2-15 - 1-10	Ballincollig	Caherlag
	T O'Keeffe 0-10, J Connolly 1-0, P O'Neill 0-2, S O'Keeffe 0-1, K O'Keeffe 0-1, B Motherway 0-1.		D Beale 0-8, J O'Driscoll 1-0, R O'Doherty 0-1, J O'Dwyer 0-1.

9 September 2006 Final	Ballincollig	2-21 - 0-02	St. Finbarr's	Mayfield
	R O'Doherty 2-4, J Dwyer 0-5, J Miskella 0-4, A Beale 0-3, D Beale 0-2, D Bownen 0-1, J O'Driscoll 0-1, J O'Brien 0-1.		P McCarthy 0-1, S Nott 0-1.	Referee: C McAllister (Midleton)

=== Round 3 ===
18 June 2006 Round 3	Tracton	2-13 - 0-19	Youghal	Páirc Uí Rinn, Cork
	K Corrigan 1-3, F Walsh 0-4, J Kingston 0-4, M Desmond 1-0, R Walsh 0-1, S Sullivan 0-1.		E Coleman 0-5, L Desmond 0-5, B Ring 0-3, S Twomey 0-2, R Cunningham 0-2, J Grace 0-1, A Murphy 0-1.	Referee: J Kearney (Na Piarsaigh)

18 June 2006 Round 3	Mallow	0-12 - 0-06	Newcestown	Páirc Uí Rinn, Cork
	F McCormack 0-10, C O'Riordan 0-1, P O'Riordan 0-1.		G O'Driscoll 0-4, J O'Sullivan 0-2.	Referee: C Lyons (Nemo Rangers)

29 June 2006 Round 3	Inniscarra	4-10 - 1-13	Argideen Rangers	Brinny
	J O'Mahony 2-0, D O'Connell 1-3, J Cassey 1-1, N O'Regan 0-3, J Olden 0-2, R Cummins 0-1.		B Hennessy 1-2, S O'Mahony 0-4, M O'Callaghan 0-4, J Murphy 0-2, M Walsh 0-1.	Referee: D O'Leary (Watergrasshill)

3 July 2006 Round 3	Courcey Rovers	3-11 - 3-14	Bishopstown	Liam MacCarthy Park, Ballygarvan
	J Murphy 2-2, M O'Donovan 1-1, N Murphy 0-4, V Hurley 0-1, B Hayes 0-1, S Hayes 0-1, C Lordan 0-1.		P Cronin 2-7, T Murray 1-1, M Power 0-2, M Cogan 0-1, R Conway 0-1, C Doyle 0-1, M Hayes 0-1.	Referee: G O'Connell (Lisgoold)

28 June 2006 Round 3 replay	Tracton	1-10 - 1-11	Youghal	Páirc Uí Rinn, Cork
	R Walsh 0-6, M Kingston 1-0, K Corrigan 0-2, K Lynch 0-1, M Desmond 0-1.		L Desmons 1-3, C Casey 0-3, E Coleman 0-2, JP Joyce 0-1, B Ring 0-1, M Ó Laochadha 0-1.	Referee: J Kearney (Na Piarsaigh)

=== Quarter-finals ===
9 July 2006 Quarter-final	Aghabullogue	0-08 - 1-11	Blarney	Ovens
	P Finnegan 0-4, Donal Twomey 0-2, M Twomey 0-1, P Kelleher 0-1.		C Sheehan 1-0, E McCarthy 0-3, J Hurley 0-3, D McSweeney 0-2, S O'Donoghue 0-1, J Hughes 0-1, D O'Leary 0-1.	Referee: D Copps (Ballyhea)

9 July 2006 Quarter-final	Carrigtwohill	0-13 - 0-13	Watergrasshill	Caherlag
	N McCarthy 0-8, J Barrett 0-2, F Flannery 0-1, Seán O'Farrell 0-1, R White 0-1.		P O'Regan 0-8, P Cahill 0-3, J Halbert 0-1, E O'Reilly 0-1.	Referee: C Lyons (Nemo Rangers)

15 July 2006 Quarter-final	Inniscarra	3-14 - 1-18	Youghal	Páirc Uí Rinn, Cork
	N O'Regan 1-5, J Olden 1-2, A O'Mahony 1-0, S Olden 0-3, S Holland 0-2, J O'Mahony 0-1, D O'Connell 0-1.		E Coleman 1-7, M Ó Laochadha 0-3, JP Joyce 0-2, B Coleman 0-2, D Ring 0-1, K Walsh 0-1, R Cunningham 0-1, C Casey 0-1.	Referee: J Dorgan (Nemo Rangers)

27 July 2006 Quarter-final	Bishopstown	1-13 - 0-14	Mallow	Páirc Mac Gearailt, Fermoy
	P Cronin 0-5, M Hayes 1-1, R Conway 0-4, T Murray 0-3.		F McCormack 0-4, C O'Riordan 0-3, P O'Riordan 0-2, T O'Riordan 0-2, J Hayes 0-1, M Buckley 0-1, P Heffernan 0-1.	Referee: C McAllister (Aghada)

16 September 2006 Quarter-final replay	Carrigtwohill	2-16 - 1-09	Watergrasshill	Caherlag
	J Barrett 1-3, N McCarthy 0-6, Séan O'Farrell 1-2, R White 0-3, F Flannery 0-2.		R Cahill 1-0, P O'Regan 0-3, P Cahill 0-2, J O'Keeffe 0-2, E O'Reilly 0-1, J Halbert 0-1.	Referee: A Cummins (Ballymartle)

=== Semi-finals ===
9 September 2006 Semi-final	Bishopstown	2-17 - 0-08	Inniscarra	Páirc Uí Chaoimh, Cork
	P Cronin 1-3, T Murray 1-2, R Conway 0-5, M Hayes 0-3, K Coughlan 0-1, K O'Halloran 0-1, J Murphy 0-1, M Power 0-1.		N O'Regan 0-4, S Olden 0-1, A O'Mahony 0-1, J Olden 0-1, D O'Connell 0-1.	Referee: J Sexton (Ballyhea)

1 October 2006 Semi-final	Carrigtwohill	1-18 - 0-09	Blarney	Páirc Uí Rinn, Cork
	N McCarthy 0-7, J Barrett 0-4, Seán O'Farrell 1-0, Séamus O'Farrell 0-2, R White 0-2, F Flannery 0-2, B Lordan 0-1.		J Hughes 0-6, J Jordan 0-1, J Hurley 0-1, R McNamara 0-1.	Referee: J Dorgan (Nemo Rangers)

=== Final ===
22 October 2006 Final	Bishopstown	0-20 - 1-11	Carrigtwohill	Páirc Uí Chaoimh, Cork
	P Cronin 0-9, R Conway 0-3, T Murray 0-3, S O'Neill 0-2, J Murphy 0-1, M Hayes 0-1, K Coghlan 0-1.		S Dineen 1-0, F Flannery 0-2, N McCarthy 0-2, M Fitzgerald 0-1, J Barrett 0-1, Séamus O'Farrell 0-1, B Lordan 0-1, Seán O'Farrell 0-1, R White 0-1, D Healy 0-1.	Referee: A Cummins (Ballymartle)

== Championship statistics ==
=== Top scorers ===
Top scorer overall

Rank	Player	Club	Tally	Total	Matches	Average
1	Pa Cronin	Bishopstown	3-36	45	6	7.50
2	Trevor O'Keeffe	Aghada	1-35	38	4	9.50
3	Niall McCarthy	Carrigtwohill	0-34	34	6	5.66
4	Neil Ronan	Ballyhea	3-17	26	3	8.66
5	Eoin Coleman	Youghal	1-22	25	4	6.25
5	Nicky O'Regan	Inniscarra	1-22	25	5	5.00
6	Ronan Conway	Bishopstown	1-19	22	6	3.66
7	Fergal McCormack	Mallow	0-21	21	3	7.00
8	Seánie O'Farrell	Carrigtwohill	4-07	19	6	3.16
8	Thomas Murray	Bishopstown	2-13	19	6	3.16
8	Jason Barrett	Carrigtwohill	1-16	19	6	3.16

Top scorers in a single game

Rank	Player	Club	Tally	Total	Opposition
1	Pa Cronin	Bishopstown	2-07	13	Courcey Rovers
2	Trevor O'Keeffe	Aghada	1-09	12	Bishopstown
3	Neil Ronan	Ballyhea	1-08	11	St. Finbarr's
3	Pa Finnegan	Aghabullogue	0-11	11	St. Finbarr's
4	Rory O'Doherty	Ballincollig	2-04	10	St. Finbarr's
4	John Halbert	Watergrasshill	1-07	10	Argideen Rangers
4	Eoin Coleman	Youghal	1-07	10	Inniscarra
4	Trevor O'Keeffe	Aghada	0-10	10	Ballincollig
4	Fergal McCormack	Mallow	0-10	10	Newcestown
5	Pa Cronin	Bishopstown	0-09	9	Aghada
5	Pa Cronin	Bishopstown	0-09	9	Carrigtwohill

=== Miscellaneous ===
- Bishopstown became the first team to win the championship undefeated.
- Bishopstown win their first Premier Intermediate title.
