= 1987 All-Ireland Junior Hurling Championship =

1987 inter-county junior hurling championship

All Ireland Champions
- Winners: Cork (10th win)
- Captain: Martin Fitzpatrick

All Ireland Runners-up
- Runners-up: Wexford
- Captain: John Barron

Provincial Champions
- Munster: Cork
- Leinster: Wexford
- Ulster: Monaghan
- Connacht: Not Played

The 1987 All-Ireland Junior Hurling Championship was the 66th staging of the All-Ireland Junior Championship since its establishment by the Gaelic Athletic Association in 1912.

Kilkenny entered the championship as the defending champions.

The All-Ireland final was played on 25 July 1987 at Semple Stadium in Thurles, between Cork and Wexford, in what was their first ever meeting in the final. Cork won the match by 3-11 to 2-13 to claim their tenth championship title overall and a first title since 1983.

== Results ==
=== Leinster Junior Hurling Championship ===
==== Leinster semi-finals ====
26 May 1987 Semi-final	Kilkenny	2-07 - 3-15	Wexford	Nowlan Park

31 May 1987 Semi-final	Wicklow	2-06 - 2-12	Dublin	Aughrim County Ground

==== Leinster final ====
7 June 1987 Final	Wexford	6-15 - 0-09	Dublin	Croke Park

=== Munster Junior Hurling Championship ===
==== Munster first round ====
28 May 1987 First round	Cork	5-24 - 0-06	Clare	Fr. Con Buckley Park

28 May 1987 First round	Tipperary	4-12 - 1-06	Waterford	Páirc Dáibhín

==== Munster-semi finals ====
7 June 1987 Semi-final	Kerry	0-07 - 5-13	Tipperary	FitzGerald Stadium

10 June 1987 Semi-final	Cork	3-20 - 3-09	Limerick	Dr. Mannix Sportsfield

==== Munster final ====
24 June 1987 Final	Tipperary	1-09 - 2-16	Cork	St. Michael's Park

=== All-Ireland Junior Hurling Championship ===
==== All-Ireland final ====
25 July 1987 Final	Cork	3-14 - 2-15	Wexford	Semple Stadium
