= Bishopstown GAA =

Gaelic games club in County Cork, Ireland

Bishopstown
- Cumann Iománaíochta agus Peile; Bhaile an Easpaig
- Founded: 1957
- County: Cork
- Nickname: The Town
- Colours
- Grounds: Bishopstown GAA Ground
- Coordinates: 51°53′04.88″N 8°31′03.52″W

Playing kits
Standard colours

Senior Club Championships
	All Ireland	Munster champions	Cork champions
Camogie:	0	0	4

Bishopstown Hurling and Football Club is a Gaelic Athletic Association club in Bishopstown, Cork, Ireland. The club is affiliated to the Seandún Board and fields teams in Gaelic football, hurling and camogie.

== History ==
Located in the suburb of Bishopstown in the southwest of Cork, Bishopstown Hurling and Football Club was founded in 1957. Bishopstown had its first success in 1971 when the club claimed the City JFC title. This was followed in 1974 with the Cork IFC title after a defeat of Newcestown in the final.

Bishopstown made a hurling breakthrough in 1977 with the City JHC title. 15 years later the club beat Cloyne by a goal to win the Cork IHC and become a dual senior club. The club added a Cork Premier IHC title to their collection in 2006 after a 0-20 to 1-11 defeat of Carrigtwohill in the final.

The new century saw Bishopstown make some progress at senior level but just fall short of claiming the title. The club lost Cork SFC finals to Nemo Rangers in 2002 and to Carbery in 2004. Bishopstown also lost the Cork SHC final to Sarsfields in 2012.

== Honours ==
- Cork Senior Camogie Championship (1): 1997, 1998, 1999, 2000
- Cork Premier Intermediate Hurling Championship (1): 2006
- Cork Intermediate Football Championship (1): 1974
- Cork Intermediate Hurling Championship (1): 1992
- Cork City Junior Hurling Championship (1): 1977
- City Junior Football Championship (2): 1971, 1992
- Cork Under-21 A Football Championship (2): 1992, 2024
- Cork Under-21 Hurling Championship (2): 2006, 2007
- Cork Under-21 B Hurling championship (1): 2025
- Cork Minor Hurling Championship (2): 2003, 2004
- Cork Minor Football Championship (3): 1992, 1993, 2000
- Féile na nGael Camogie Division 1 (1): 1987

== Notable players ==
- Barry Coffey: All-Ireland SFC-winner {1989, 1990)
- Pa Cronin: Munster SHC-winner (2006, 2014)
- Johnny Crowley: All-Ireland SHC-winner (1976, 1977, 1978, 1984, 1986)
- Brian Cuthbert: All-Ireland MFC-winner {1993)
- Eithne Duggan: All-Ireland SCC-winner {1995, 1997, 1998, 2002)
- Paul McGrath: All-Ireland SFC-winner {1989, 1990)
- Ken O'Halloran: All-Ireland SFC-winner {2010)
- Shane O'Neill: All-Ireland SHC-winner {2005)
- Jamie O'Sullivan: All-Ireland SFC-winner {2010)
