= 1986 All-Ireland Junior Hurling Championship =

All Ireland Champions
- Winners: Kilkenny (6th win)
- Captain: Michael Morrissey

All Ireland Runners-up
- Runners-up: Limerick
- Captain: Michael O'Connor

Provincial Champions
- Munster: Limerick
- Leinster: Kilkenny
- Ulster: Monaghan
- Connacht: Not Played

The 1986 All-Ireland Junior Hurling Championship was the 65th staging of the All-Ireland Junior Championship since its establishment by the Gaelic Athletic Association in 1912.

Wexford entered the championship as the defending champions, however, they were beaten in the Leinster Championship.

The All-Ireland final was played on 24 August 1986 at Semple Stadium in Thurles, between Kilkenny and Limerick, in what was their first ever meeting in a final. Kilkenny won the match by 1-17 to 0-15 to claim their sixth championship title overall and a first title since 1984.

== Results ==
=== All-Ireland Junior Hurling Championship ===
==== All-Ireland semi-finals ====
| 27 July 1986 Semi-final | Kilkenny | 0-18 - 2-09 | Galway | Nowlan Park |

| 27 July 1986 Semi-final | Monaghan | 1-08 - 4-15 | Limerick | Emmet Park |

==== All-Ireland final ====
| 24 August 1986 Final | Kilkenny | 1-17 - 0-15 | Limerick | Semple Stadium |
