= Blackrock–Glen Rovers hurling rivalry =

Hurling team rivalry

Blackrock v Glen Rovers
- Location: Cork
- Teams: Blackrock; Glen Rovers
- First meeting: 25 April 1926; Blackrock 7-08 – 1-03 Glen Rovers
- Latest meeting: 4 August 2023; Blackrock 3-20 – 1-18 Glen Rovers; Cork PSHC

Statistics
- Total meetings: 40
- Most wins: Blackrock (20)
- Most player appearances: Éamonn O'Donoghue (16)
- Top scorer: Éamonn O'Donoghue (9-20); Pat Horgan (1-44)
- All-time series: Blackrock: 20; Drawn: 3 Glen Rovers: 17

The Blackrock–Glen Rovers rivalry is a hurling rivalry between Cork city club teams Blackrock and Glen Rovers. It is considered to be one of the biggest rivalries in Cork hurling.

Blackrock and Glen Rovers first played a senior championship match on 25 April 1926; as of October 2020, the two clubs have faced each other 39 times in total. Blackrock have won 19 and Glen Rovers have won 17, with three ending in a draw.

Regarded as two of Cork club hurling's "big three", with St Finbarr's making up the trio, a county final between "the Rockies" and "the Glen" is historically regarded as a special occasion.

== History ==
=== Formation to 1931 ===
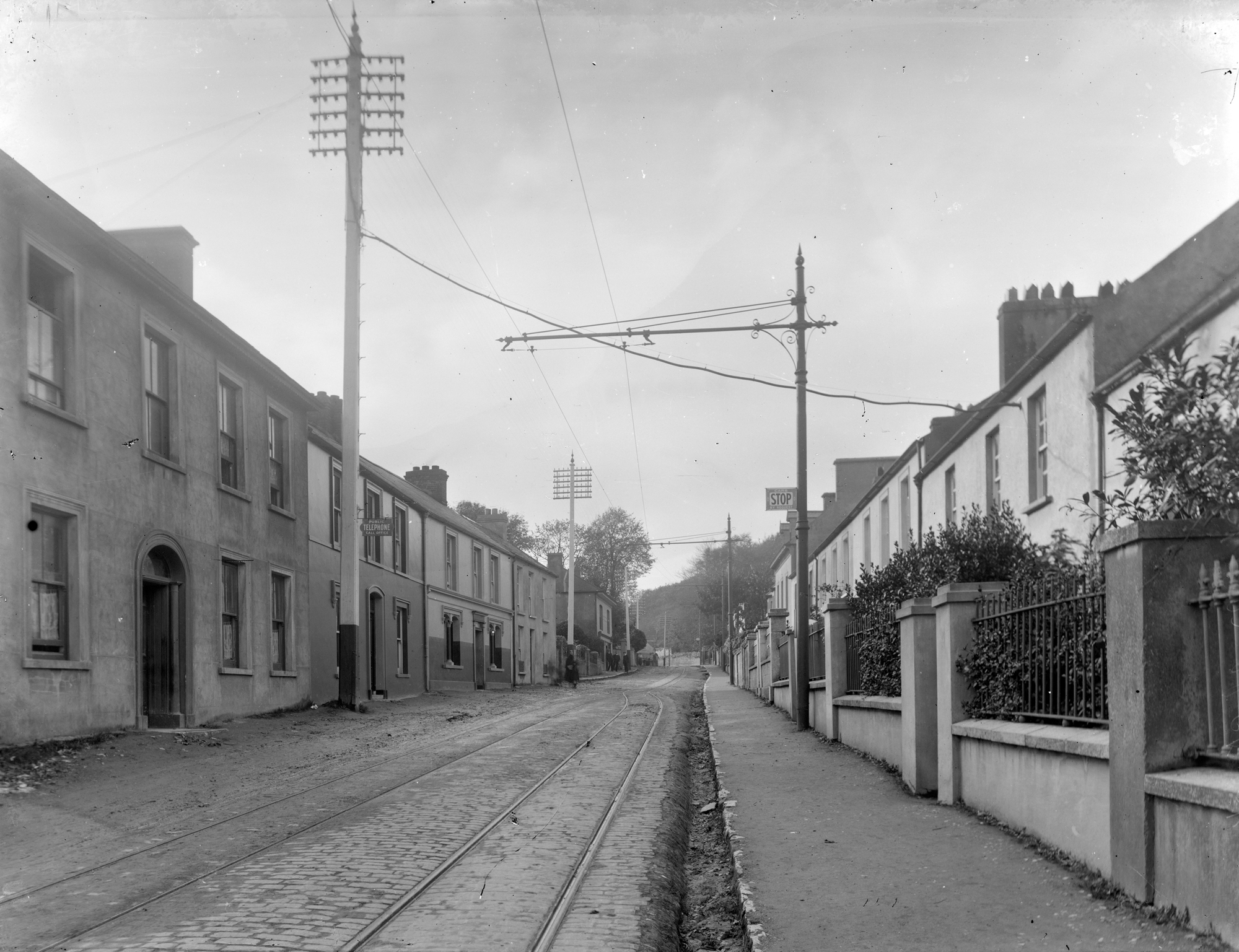
Blackrock at the turn of the 20th century. Their hurling dominance at county and national level led to the area being nicknamed the "home of hurling".

Formed as Cork Nationals in Blackrock in 1883, the club predates the foundation of the Gaelic Athletic Association by one year. They entered a team in the inaugural Cork County Championship in 1887, eventually being declared champions without having to play the final. They quickly established themselves as one of the preeminent teams, not only in Cork but in the country, and claimed ten championships in 21 years. Blackrock along with their great rivals from the early years of the championship St Finbarr's, are the only two teams that have never been relegated or faced regrading from senior level.

Glen Rovers was established in 1916 after five Blackpool-based members of the Brian Dillons club broke away over the failure to present winners' medals to the players after claiming the Cork Minor Championship in 1915. A decade after their formation, Glen Rovers joined the senior ranks after back-to-back promotions from the County Junior Championship in 1924 and the County Intermediate Championship in 1925.

The Glen's first ever senior championship game was a first-round tie against Blackrock on 25 April 1926. At that stage Blackrock had won 17 championship titles, were the all-time roll of honour leaders, were the reigning champions and were attempting to claim a third successive title. The Cork Examiner noted the one-sided nature of the game, with Blackrock claiming a 7–8 to 1–3 victory, however, it was also reported that the Glen hurled "well and determinedly" in the first half.

Two years later Blackrock once again put Glen Rovers to the sword when they clashed in a 1928 first round game before the two sides clashed in their very first final on 14 September 1930. Blackrock were arguably at the very peak of their hurling powers at this stage, while the Glen were making their championship decider debut. The Cork Examiner noted that "Glen Rovers extended their opponents in the most vigorous fashion in the first half"; however, "Blackrock had the measure of their plucky rivals in the second half." A 3–8 to 1–3 scoreline resulted in victory for a star-studded Blackrock team who contained the majority of the successful Cork senior hurling teams of that era. Blackrock made it four straight wins over Glen Rovers with a 3–4 to 1–1 victory in the 1931 second round.

=== 1934–1954 ===
On 26 August 1934, Glen Rovers recorded their very first championship victory over Blackrock. Fourteen points separated the teams at the final whistle, with contemporary newspaper reports highlighting that the game "fell far short of expectations" but "the superiority of the Glen Rovers was unmistakeable all the way from the first ball." The Glen asserted their dominance with a 1938 semi-final win before the sides clashed in their second-ever final on 15 October 1939. Billed as the game of the century, this was regarded as a battle between the old and the new. Blackrock held a one-point half-time lead; however, the Glen took complete control in the second half after Jack Lynch was moved to centre-forward. "Cooper" Moylan top-scored with 2–1 as the Glen claimed a record-breaking sixth successive title after the 5–4 to 2–5 victory.

After a third successive championship defeat of Blackrock in 1940 – their fourth overall – Glen Rovers next faced their rivals in the championship final on 17 October 1948. The Cork Examiner reported that "Glen Rovers once again proved themselves to be Cork's greatest hurling fifteen." In what was regarded as "a real day for the veterans", Jack Lynch and Din Joe Buckley of the Glen and Johnny Quirke of Blackrock came in for particular praise. Glen newcomer Jimmy Lynam was described as giving his best display since joining the senior team, as Blackrock were bested by 5–7 to 3–2.

The Glen recorded further championship wins over the Rockies at various stages of the championship in 1949, 1951 and 1953, before facing each other in the final on 26 September 1954. Glen Rovers lined out with eight of Cork's all-conquering 1952–1954 All-Ireland SHC-winning teams; however, the game was regarded as a tremendous struggle as an inexperienced Blackrock side stood up to the star-studded Glen. There were a number of outstanding performances on both sides including Vincy Twomey for Glen Rovers and Mick Cashman for Blackrock, while Christy Ring claimed his eighth winners' medal, just three weeks after winning an eighth All-Ireland medal, after the 3–7 to 3–2 win.

=== 1956–1978 ===
On 14 October 1956, Glen Rovers and Blackrock clashed for the fifth time in a final. The Cork Examiner described it as "a final that must rank with the best ever seen at the venue. It lived fully up to expectations of what a Cork Final should be and ended in the recording of the most popular victory in years." Three times over the course of the hour the sides were level; however, each time Blackrock showed their determination to come from behind. Top Glen Rovers forward Christy Ring was limited to just one goal as Blackrock held them scoreless for 30 minutes to secure a 2–10 to 2–2 victory and a first title since 1931. It was also the Rockies first win over the Glen in 25 years.

Glen Rovers avenged the 1956 defeat in the second round the following year, before once again facing each other in the final on 25 October 1959. The Glen looked to be in danger after the first half when, aided by a not inconsiderable breeze, they led by just a point. Blackrock had cause for optimism; however, with the wind at their backs in the second half they inexplicably collapsed. Christy Ring was, once again, the Glen's top scorer in the 3–11 to 3–5 victory.

After a quarter-final victory for the Glen in 1960, it would be 13 years before the two sides faced each other again. The occasion was the 1973 final on 14 October 1973. In what was described in the Cork Examiner as a "memorable" game, the Glen dominated the first half, while the Rockies took command after the interval and, courtesy of a fortuitous Donie Collins goal, secured a 2–12 to 2–10 win. The victory gave Blackrock their 25th championship title, while it also broke the Glen's unbeaten record in eight finals.

Two years later, Blackrock and Glen Rovers once again clashed in a final on 14 September 1975. Played at the Mardyke due to the construction of the new Páirc Uí Chaoimh, the game was described as "Ray Cummins' final" due to the large influence he asserted on the game at full-forward. Blackrock looked the slightly more impressive side in the first half, turning over with an interval lead of a goal. Their strength in attack was highlighted in the second half and the game was virtually over as a contest as early as eight minutes after the break. The Cork Examiner described it as "one of the poorest displays" from a Glen Rovers team, as they were bested by 4–11 to 0–10.

On 3 October 1976, the Glen and the Rockies clashed in a second successive final, the first to be played at newly built Páirc Uí Chaoimh. Glen Rovers looked to be destined for a second successive defeat when they trailed by six points at half time and lost their inspirational defender Denis Coughlan to an eye injury. The Glen clawed their way back into the game in the second half, with Patsy Harte securing the vital goal in the 50th minute to clinch a 2–7 to 0–10 victory and restore the Glen's pride.

For the fourth time in six seasons, Blackrock and the Glen faced each other in a final on 22 October 1978. Both sides had clashed earlier in the group stage of the newly restructured championship, with the Rockies claiming victory on that occasion. The final was just four minutes old when Blackrock conceded a shock goal; however, the Glen failed to capitalise on this. Blackrock were in ruthless form for the rest of the game, with Ray Cummins once again coming in for particular praise after a personal tally of 1–4. The Glen collapsed in the second half and endured a 4–12 to 1–7 defeat.

=== 1979–present ===
In the 30 championships to be held between 1979 and 2008, Blackrock and Glen Rovers faced each other on 16 occasions; however, not one of these was in a final. The Rockies dominated these encounters, claiming 11 victories to the Glen's five. On 4 October 2020, the two sides faced each other in a final for the first time since 1978. Blackrock's Alan Connolly knocked over a last-minute free to tie the game at 1–20 to 3–14, seconds after Patrick Horgan looked like he had clinched victory for the Glen with a point. Blackrock capitalised on the opportunity presented to them in extra-time with substitutes Robbie Cotter, Alan O'Callaghan and Tadhg Deasy scoring a combined tally of 3-5 when introduced. Shane O'Keeffe also netted in extra-time to secure a 4–26 to 4–18 victory.

== Honours, results and records ==
=== Honours ===
County honours
Competition	Blackrock		Glen Rovers	
Competition	Titles	Year	Titles	Year
Senior Championship	33	1887, 1889, 1891, 1893, 1894, 1895, 1897, 1898, 1903, 1908, 1910, 1911, 1912, 1913, 1920, 1924, 1925, 1927, 1929, 1930, 1931, 1956, 1961, 1971, 1973, 1975, 1978, 1979, 1985, 1999, 2001, 2002, 2020	27	1934, 1935, 1936, 1937, 1938, 1939, 1940, 1941, 1944, 1945, 1948, 1949, 1950, 1953, 1954, 1958, 1959, 1960, 1962, 1964, 1967, 1969, 1972, 1976, 1989, 2015, 2016
Intermediate Championship	1	2019	7	1925, 1954, 1956, 1957, 1958, 1961, 1965
Junior Championship	5	1895, 1901, 1910, 1931, 1947	2	1924, 1950
County total	39		36	
National and provincial honours
All-Ireland Club Championship	3	1972, 1974, 1979	2	1973, 1977
Munster Club Championship	5	1971, 1973, 1975, 1978, 1979	3	1964, 1972, 1976
National and provincial total	8		5	
Combined total
Combined total	47		41	

=== All-time results ===
Date	Venue	Matches			Competition
Date	Venue	Team 1	Score	Team 2	Competition
25 April 1926	The Mardyke	Blackrock	7–8 – 1–3	Glen Rovers	Cork SHC first round
25 March 1928	Turners Cross	Blackrock	5–7 – 2–1	Glen Rovers	Cork SHC first round
14 September 1930	Cork Athletic Grounds	Blackrock	3–8 – 1–3	Glen Rovers	Cork SHC final
15 November 1931	The Mardyke	Blackrock	3–4 – 1–1	Glen Rovers	Cork SHC second round
26 August 1934	The Mardyke	Glen Rovers	3–6 – 0–1	Blackrock	Cork SHC second round
25 September 1938	The Mardyke	Glen Rovers	6–5 – 1–6	Blackrock	Cork SHC semi-final
15 October 1939	Cork Athletic Grounds	Glen Rovers	5–4 – 2–5	Blackrock	Cork SHC final
16 June 1940	Cork Athletic Grounds	Glen Rovers	5–6 – 2–9	Blackrock	Cork SHC semi-final
17 October 1948	Cork Athletic Grounds	Glen Rovers	5–7 – 3–2	Blackrock	Cork SHC final
12 June 1949	Cork Athletic Grounds	Glen Rovers	2–8 – 2–2	Blackrock	Cork SHC first round
23 September 1951	Cork Athletic Grounds	Glen Rovers	5–7 – 4–4	Blackrock	Cork SHC semi-final
11 October 1953	Cork Athletic Grounds	Glen Rovers	1–13 – 0–8	Blackrock	Cork SHC semi-final
26 September 1954	Cork Athletic Grounds	Glen Rovers	3–7 – 3–2	Blackrock	Cork SHC final
14 October 1956	Cork Athletic Grounds	Blackrock	2–10 – 2–2	Glen Rovers	Cork SHC final
7 July 1957	Cork Athletic Grounds	Glen Rovers	2–8 – 2–4	Blackrock	Cork SHC second round
25 October 1959	Cork Athletic Grounds	Glen Rovers	3–11 – 3–5	Blackrock	Cork SHC final
10 July 1960	Cork Athletic Grounds	Glen Rovers	4–5 – 1–8	Blackrock	Cork SHC quarter-final
14 October 1973	Cork Athletic Grounds	Blackrock	2–12 – 2–10	Glen Rovers	Cork SHC final
14 September 1975	The Mardyke	Blackrock	4–11 – 0–10	Glen Rovers	Cork SHC final
3 October 1976	Páirc Uí Chaoimh	Glen Rovers	2–7 – 0–10	Blackrock	Cork SHC final
9 June 1978	Páirc Uí Chaoimh	Blackrock	0–17 – 1–9	Glen Rovers	Cork SHC group stage
22 October 1978	Páirc Uí Chaoimh	Blackrock	4–12 – 1–7	Glen Rovers	Cork SHC final
26 April 1979	Páirc Uí Chaoimh	Blackrock	2–12 – 1–10	Glen Rovers	Cork SHC group stage
22 September 1979	Páirc Uí Chaoimh	Blackrock	4–9 – 0–11	Glen Rovers	Cork SHC semi-final
31 May 1980	Páirc Uí Chaoimh	Blackrock	2–10 – 1–10	Glen Rovers	Cork SHC group stage
28 September 1980	Páirc Uí Chaoimh	Glen Rovers	1–12 – 0–12	Blackrock	Cork SHC semi-final
23 August 1981	Páirc Uí Chaoimh	Glen Rovers	5–9 – 3–11	Blackrock	Cork SHC semi-final
22 August 1982	Páirc Uí Chaoimh	Glen Rovers	1–17 – 2–14	Blackrock	Cork SHC semi-final
26 September 1982	Páirc Uí Chaoimh	Blackrock	1–16 – 2–8	Glen Rovers	Cork SHC semi-final replay
28 June 1985	Páirc Uí Chaoimh	Blackrock	0–16 – 2–10	Glen Rovers	Cork SHC quarter-final
8 September 1985	Páirc Uí Chaoimh	Blackrock	2–19 – 1–11	Glen Rovers	Cork SHC quarter-final replay
14 June 1986	Páirc Uí Chaoimh	Blackrock	1–19 – 2–9	Glen Rovers	Cork SHC quarter-final
13 August 1989	Páirc Uí Chaoimh	Glen Rovers	4–11 – 1–9	Blackrock	Cork SHC semi-final
12 July 1997	Páirc Uí Chaoimh	Blackrock	2–13 – 4–5	Glen Rovers	Cork SHC second round
11 October 1998	Páirc Uí Chaoimh	Blackrock	1–14 – 1–11	Glen Rovers	Cork SHC semi-final
25 September 2004	Páirc Uí Chaoimh	Blackrock	0–15 – 1–12	Glen Rovers	Cork SHC quarter-final
3 October 2004	Páirc Uí Chaoimh	Blackrock	0–18 – 0–11	Glen Rovers	Cork SHC quarter-final replay
17 August 2008	Páirc Uí Chaoimh	Glen Rovers	3–11 – 0–15	Blackrock	Cork SHC quarter-final
1 August 2020	Páirc Uí Chaoimh	Blackrock	4–26 – 4–18	Glen Rovers	Cork PSHC final
4 August 2023	Páirc Uí Rinn	Blackrock	3–20 – 1–18	Glen Rovers	Cork PSHC group stage

=== Records ===
- First championship meeting: Blackrock 7–8 – 1–3 Glen Rovers – Cork SHC first round, The Mardyke 25 April 1926
- Highest scoring game:
  - Blackrock 4–26 – 4–18 Glen Rovers, Cork SHC final, Páirc Uí Chaoimh, 4 October 2020
- Largest winning margin:
  - Blackrock 7–8 – 1–3 Glen Rovers, Cork SHC first round, The Mardyke, 25 April 1926
- Most consecutive wins: Glen Rovers: 9 (26 August 1934 – 26 September 1954)
- Longest undefeated run: Glen Rovers: 9 (26 August 1934 – 26 September 1954; 9 wins)
- Highest attendance: 26,887 – Blackrock 4–12 – 1–7 Glen Rovers, Cork SHC final, Páirc Uí Chaoimh, 22 October 1978
