= Blackrock–St Finbarr's hurling rivalry =

Hurling team rivalry

Blackrock v St Finbarr's
- Location: Cork
- Teams: Blackrock; St Finbarr's
- Latest meeting: 6 August 2022; Blackrock 1–20 – 0–24 St Finbarr's; Cork PSHC
- Next meeting: 16 October 2022

The Blackrock–St Finbarr's rivalry is a hurling rivalry between Cork city club teams Blackrock and St Finbarr's. It is considered to be one of the biggest rivalries in Cork hurling.

Regarded as two of Cork club hurling's "big three", with Glen Rovers making up the trio, a county final between "the Rockies" and "the Barrs" is historically regarded as a special occasion.

== History ==
=== Formation ===
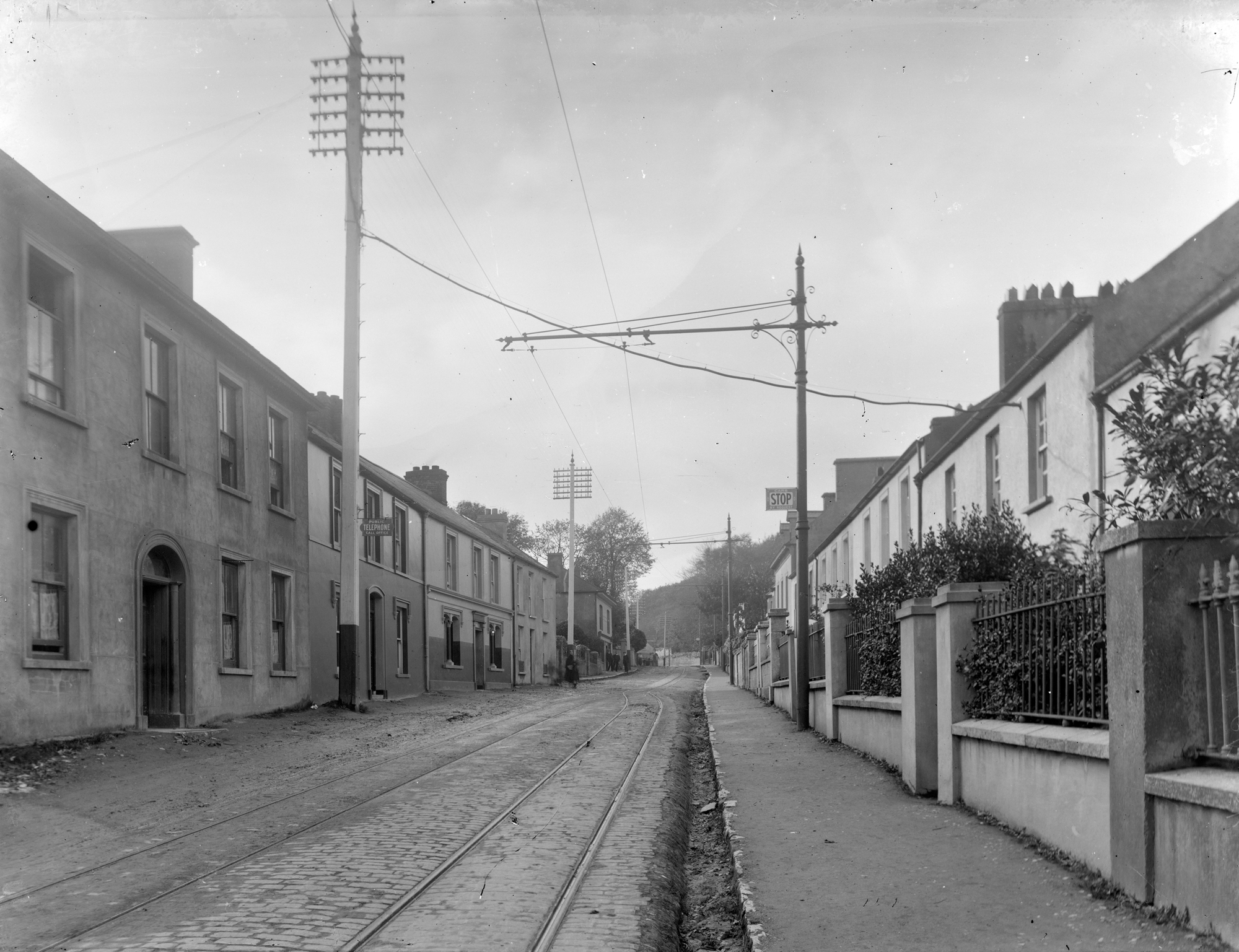
Blackrock at the turn of the 20th century. Their hurling dominance at county and national level led to the area being nicknamed the "home of hurling".

Formed as St Finbarr's National Hurling & Football Club in Togher in 1876, the club had been active and competitive in the years before the establishment of the Gaelic Athletic Association in 1884. They entered a team in the inaugural Cork County Championship in 1887, and claimed their first title in 1899.

Formed as Cork Nationals in Blackrock in 1883, the club predates the foundation of the Gaelic Athletic Association by one year. They entered a team in the inaugural Cork County Championship in 1887, eventually being declared champions without having to play the final. They quickly established themselves as one of the preeminent teams, not only in Cork but in the country, and claimed ten championships in 21 years. St Finbarr's and Blackrock are the only two teams that have never been relegated or faced regrading from senior level.

== Honours, results and records ==
=== Honours ===
County honours
Competition	Blackrock		St Finbarr's	
Competition	Titles	Year	Titles	Year
Senior Championship	33	1887, 1889, 1891, 1893, 1894, 1895, 1897, 1898, 1903, 1908, 1910, 1911, 1912, 1913, 1920, 1924, 1925, 1927, 1929, 1930, 1931, 1956, 1961, 1971, 1973, 1975, 1978, 1979, 1985, 1999, 2001, 2002, 2020	25	1899, 1904, 1905, 1906, 1919, 1922, 1923, 1926, 1932, 1933, 1942, 1943, 1946, 1947, 1955, 1965, 1968, 1974, 1977, 1980, 1981, 1982, 1984, 1988, 1993
Intermediate Championship	1	2019	1	1990
Junior Championship	5	1895, 1901, 1910, 1931, 1947	3	1902, 1903, 1956
County total	39		29	
National and provincial honours
All-Ireland Club Championship	3	1972, 1974, 1979	2	1975, 1978
Munster Club Championship	5	1971, 1973, 1975, 1978, 1979	3	1968, 1974, 1977
National and provincial total	8		5	
Combined total
Combined total	47		34	

=== Recent results ===
Date	Venue	Matches			Competition
Date	Venue	Team 1	Score	Team 2	Competition
10 August 1980	Ballinlough Grounds	Blackrock	2–10 – 0–12	St Finbarr's	Cork SHC group stage
10 October 1982	Páirc Uí Chaoimh	St Finbarr's	2–17 – 3–9	Blackrock	Cork SHC final
16 September 1984	Páirc Uí Chaoimh	St Finbarr's	4–9 – 2–10	Blackrock	Cork SHC semi-final
19 August 1988	Páirc Uí Chaoimh	St Finbarr's	3–12 – 2–15	Blackrock	Cork SHC semi-final
15 September 1988	Páirc Uí Chaoimh	St Finbarr's	2–6 – 0–7	Blackrock	Cork SHC semi-final replay
22 June 1996	Páirc Uí Chaoimh	St Finbarr's	4–15 – 1–9	Blackrock	Cork SHC second round
3 October 1999	Páirc Uí Rinn	St Finbarr's	0–16 – 2–10	Blackrock	Cork SHC semi-final
10 October 1999	Páirc Uí Chaoimh	Blackrock	1–17 – 0–15	St Finbarr's	Cork SHC semi-final replay
28 July 2002	Páirc Uí Chaoimh	Blackrock	1–12 – 1–9	St Finbarr's	Cork SHC round 3
20 August 2005	Páirc Uí Chaoimh	St Finbarr's	2–14 – 1–13	Blackrock	Cork SHC quarter-final
14 June 2008	Páirc Uí Chaoimh	St Finbarr's	0–14 – 0–14	Blackrock	Cork SHC round 3
22 June 2008	Páirc Uí Chaoimh	Blackrock	1–14 – 2–4	St Finbarr's	Cork SHC round 3 replay
21 June 2015	Páirc Uí Rinn	Blackrock	2–11 – 0–15	St Finbarr's	Cork SHC round 2
15 September 2018	Páirc Uí Chaoimh	Blackrock	1–20 – 1–11	St Finbarr's	Cork SHC quarter-final
10 October 2021	Páirc Uí Chaoimh	Blackrock	3–22 – 0–21	St Finbarr's	Cork PSHC round 3
6 August 2022	Páirc Uí Chaoimh	St Finbarr's	0–24 – 1–20	Blackrock	Cork PSHC round 2
16 October 2022	Páirc Uí Chaoimh	St Finbarr's	2–14 – 1–7	Blackrock	Cork PSHC final
