= 1971 Cork Senior Hurling Championship =

Annual hurling competition season

- Dates: 25 April – 3 October 1971
- Teams: 17
- Champions: Blackrock (24th title); John Horgan (captain)
- Runners-up: St. Finbarr's; Tony Maher (captain)

Tournament statistics
- Matches played: 16
- Goals scored: 97 (6.06 per match)
- Points scored: 302 (18.88 per match)
- Top scorer(s): Pat Moylan (0-37)

The 1971 Cork Senior Hurling Championship was the 83rd staging of the Cork Senior Hurling Championship since its establishment by the Cork County Board in 1887. The championship began on 25 April 1971 and ended on 3 October 1971.

University College Cork entered the championship as the defending champions, however, they were beaten by Passage in the second round.

The final was played on 3 October 1971 at the Athletic Grounds in Cork, between Blackrock and St. Finbvarr's, in what was their first meeting in the final in 42 years. Blackrock won the match by 2–19 to 5–04 to claim their 24th championship title overall and a first title in 10 years.

Blackrock's Pat Moylan was the championship's top scorer with 0-37.

== Team changes ==
=== To Championship ===
Promoted from the Cork Intermediate Hurling Championship

- Cloyne

== Results ==
=== First round ===
25 April 1971 First round	Carbery	4-07 - 5-08	Duhallow	Macroom
	S O'Neill 1-5, J Forrestal 1-1, T Crowley 1-0, V O'Donovan 1-0, A O'Halloran 0-1.		B Buckley 2-5, M Biggane 1-0, M Stokes 1-0, B O'Connor 1-0, John O'Sullivan 0-1, S Daly 0-1, TD Cronin 0-1.

=== Second round ===
25 April 1971 Second round	Blackrock	3-10 - 0-04	Avondhu	Castlelyons
	P Moylan 0-7, D Collins 1-2, N O'Keeffe 1-1, J O'Halloran 1-0.		P Morrissey 0-2, J Russell 0-1, P Buckley 0-1.

25 April 1971 Second round	Carrigdhoun	4-05 - 1-06	St. Vincent's	Ballincollig
	JJ Hurley 2-0, T Fogarty 1-3, F Coleman 1-0, D Walsh 0-1, B Coleman 0-1.		B Heffernan 0-4, N Heffernan 1-0, B O'Neill 0-2.

1 May 1971 Second round	Passage	4-10 - 1-10	University College Cork	Cork Athletic Grounds
	B Meade 0-7, N Rooney 1-1, J Coffey 1-0, F Gilligan 1-0, N Delaney 1-0, M O'Donoghue 0-2.		T Buckley 1-3, M Crotty 0-2, M Dowling 0-2, D Walsh 0-1, P Lucey 0-1, J Darcy 0-1.	Referee: M Walsh (Mayfield)

2 May 1971 Second round	Imokilly	2-08 - 1-14	Cloyne	Clonmult Memorial Park
	T Browne 2-2, S Barry 0-6.		D Motherway 0-5, T Canavan 1-1, B Aherne 0-3, D Clifford 0-2, J Aherne 0-1, M O'Brien 0-1, N Cusack 0-1.	Referee: M Walsh (Mayfield)

9 May 1971 Second round	Na Piarsaigh	3-10 - 2-10	Sarsfields	Páirc Séamus de Barra
	S Twomey 2-5, T Ahern 1-1, T Mullins 0-2, T Kennefick 0-1, L Joyce 0-1.		JJ Long 1-3, S O'Riordan 0-4, R Barry 1-0, T McEvoy 0-1, R Rahilly 0-1, P Lambe 0-1.	Referee: D O'Brien (Cobh)

9 May 1971 Second round	Duhallow	1-02 - 6-13	Glen Rovers	Bishop Casey Memorial Park
	M Biggane 1-0, B Buckley 0-2.		P Harte 3-2, D McCarthy 2-0, J Young 1-1, D Coughlan 0-4, T O'Brien 0-2, J Daly 0-2, B O'Connell 0-1, J O'Sullivan 0-1.	Referee: D Twomey (Mitchelstown)

6 June 1971 Second round	Seandún	4-12 - 4-14	Youghal	Castlemartyr
	J Barrett 1-3, J Good 1-2, W Murphy 1-2, B Hegarty 1-1, V Twomey 0-3, P O'Sullivan 0-1.		S O'Leary 1-7, F Cooper 2-0, F Keane 0-4, W Walsh 1-0, N Gallagher 0-2, P Hegarty 0-1.	Referee: F Murphy (Blackrock)

20 June 1971 Second round	Muskerry	0-09 - 2-10	St. Finbarr's	Charlie Hurley Park
	T Looney 0-3, T O'Mahony 0-2, M Malone 0-2, C Kelly 0-1, F Kelleher 0-1.		C Roche 0-4, M Archer 1-0, P Doolan 1-0, C Cullinane 0-3, S Gillen 0-2, D O'Grady 0-1.	Referee: F Murphy (Blackrock)

=== Quarter-finals ===
27 June 1971 Quarter-final	Blackrock	2-12 - 2-02	Cloyne	Páirc Uí Chonaill
	P Moylan 0-11, D Collins 1-1, N O'Keeffe 1-0.		M O'Brien 1-0, D Motherway 1-0, D Clifford 0-1, J Aherne 0-1.	Referee: D O'Brien (Cobh)

11 July 1971 Quarter-final	Youghal	7-10 - 2-04	Na Piarsaigh	Páirc Séamus de Barra
	F Keane 3-2, S O'Leary 3-1, F Cooper 1-0, M Hodnett 0-3, P Hegarty 0-2, N Gallagher 0-1, N Horgan 0-1.		S Twomey 1-2, F Foley 1-0, D O'Leary 0-1, L Joyce 0-1.

11 July 1971 Quarter-final	Glen Rovers	5-15 - 2-04	Passage	Cork Athletic Grounds
	T O'Brien 2-4, M Corbett 2-0, P Harte 1-5, M McAuliffe 0-3, D Coughlan 0-1, J Young 0-1, B O'Connell 0-1.		B Meade 1-0, N Rooney 1-0, J McCarthy 0-2, F Gilligan 0-1, G Sullivan 0-1.

8 August 1971 Quarter-final	St. Finbarr's	3-16 - 3-07	Carrigdhoun	Manning Park
	S Gillen 1-5, J Barry-Murphy 1-2, B O'Brien 1-1, G McCarthy 0-3, C Roche 0-2, T Butler 0-2, C Cullinane 0-1.		JK Coleman 1-2, G Hanley 1-1, J Ryan 1-0, D Coleman 0-2, B Coleman 0-1, JJ Hurley 0-1.	Referee: D O'Brien (Cobh)

=== Semi-finals ===
27 August 1971 Semi-final	St. Finbarr's	4-14 - 3-09	Glen Rovers	Cork Athletic Grounds
	M Archer 3-1, C Roche 0-4, B O'Brien 0-4, J Barry-Murphy 1-0, S Gillen 0-3, G McCarthy 0-2.		P Harte 1-6, P Doherty 1-1, J Young 1-0, M Cobett 0-2.	Referee: F Murphy (Blackrock)

29 August 1971 Semi-final	Blackrock	5-19 - 5-05	Youghal	Clonmult Memorial Park
	D Collins 2-5, R Cummins 2-3, P Moylan 0-9, D Prendergast 1-1, J O'Halloran 0-1.		S O'Leary 2-1, F Cooper 2-0, N Hogan 1-0, F Keane 0-1, R O'Sullivan 0-1, N Gallagher 0-1, P Hegarty 0-1.	Referee: D O'Brien (Cobh)

=== Final ===
3 October 1971 Final	Blackrock	2-19 - 5-04	St. Finbarr's	Cork Athletic Grounds
	P Moylan 0-10, R Cummins 2-1, D Collins 0-4, B Cummins 0-2, D Prendergast 0-1, J O'Halloran 0-1.		C McCarthy 3-0, C Cullinane 1-1, J Barry-Murphy 1-0, B O'Brien 0-2, G McCarthy 0-1.	Attendance: 22,115; Referee: J Moloney (Tipperary)

== Championship statistics ==
=== Top scorers ===
Top scorers overall

Rank	Player	Club	Tally	Total	Matches	Average
1	Pat Moylan	Blackrock	0-37	37	4	9.25
2	Patsy Harte	Glen Rovers	5-13	28	3	9.33
3	Seánie O'Leary	Youghal	6-09	27	3	9.00
4	Donie Collins	Blackrock	4-12	24	4	6.00
5	Ray Cummins	Blackrock	4-04	16	2	8.00
5	Seán Twomey	Na Piarsaigh	3-07	16	2	8.00
5	Frank Keane	Youghal	3-07	16	3	5.33
8	Frank Cooper	Youghal	5-00	15	3	5.00
9	Mick Archer	St. Finbarr's	4-01	13	3	4.33
9	Brendan Buckley	Duhallow	2-07	13	2	6.50
9	Séamus Gillen	St. Finbarr's	1-10	13	4	3.25

Top scorers in a single game

Rank	Player	Club	Tally	Total	Opposition
1	Patsy Harte	Glen Rovers	3-02	11	Duhallow
1	Frank Keane	Youghal	3-02	11	Na Piarsaigh
1	Seán Twomey	Na Piarsaigh	2-05	11	Sarsfields
1	Donie Collins	Blackrock	2-05	11	Youghal
1	Brendan Buckley	Duhallow	2-05	11	Carbery
1	Pat Moylan	Blackrock	0-11	11	Cloyne
7	Seánie O'Leary	Youghal	3-01	10	Na Piarsaigh
7	Mick Archer	St. Finbarr's	3-01	10	Glen Rovers
7	Teddy O'Brien	Glen Rovers	2-04	10	Passage
7	Seánie O'Leary	Youghal	1-07	10	Seandún
7	Pat Moylan	Blackrock	0-10	10	St. Finbarr's
