= Peter O'Grady =

Irish hurler (1903–1980)

Personal information
- Native name: Peadar Ó Gráda (Irish)
- Nickname: Hawker
- Born: 28 June 1903 Buttevant, County Cork, Ireland
- Died: 2 August 1980 (Aged 77) Victoria Hospital, Cork, Ireland
- Occupation: Welder

Sport
- Sport: Hurling
- Position: Full-forward
Clubs
- Years: Club
- Buttevant; Collins; Blackrock
Club titles
- Cork titles: 3
Inter-county
Years	County	Apps (scores)
1928-1931	Cork	15 (1-01)
Inter-county titles
- Munster titles: 3
- All-Irelands: 3
- NHL: 1

Philip Peter O'Grady (28 June 1903 – 2 August 1980), commonly known as Hawker O'Grady, was an Irish hurler. His career included County Championship successes with the Blackrock club and All-Ireland Championship victory with the Cork senior hurling team.

== Playing career ==
=== Blackrock ===
O'Grady first played hurling with his local club Buttevant and the Collins club in Cork, however, it was as a member of the Blackrock club that he enjoyed his greatest successes. He claimed his first silverware in 1929 when the club defeated St. Finbarr's by 5-06 to 2-02 to win the Cork County Championship. O'Grady added a second winners' medal to his collection the following year, after Blackrock's 3-08 to 1-03 victory over Glen Rovers in the final. Blackrock qualified for a third successive final in 1931, with O'Grady winning a third and final championship title after the 2-04 to 0-03 win over Éire Óg.

=== Cork ===
O'Grady made his first appearance for the Cork senior team when he was selected at right wing-back for the 1928 Munster final against Clare. After the 2-02 apiece draw, he was again selected in the same position for the replay and claimed his first Munster Championship medal after the 6-04 to 2-02 win. O'Grady won his first All-Ireland Championship after a 6-12 to 1-00 defeat of Galway in the 1928 All-Ireland final.

During the 1928-29 National League, O'Grady was switched from wing-back to centre-forward, a position he retained for the 1929 Munster Championship. He claimed a second successive provincial winners' medal after the 4-06 to 2-03 win over Waterford before later winning a second successive All-Ireland winners' medal after the 4-09 to 1-03 win over Galway in a second successive final. O'Grady won a National League medal when Cork claimed the 1929-30 title following a win over Dublin.

O'Grady won a third Munster Championship in four seasons after Cork's 5-04 to 1-02 win over Waterford in the 1931 Munster final replay. The subsequent All-Ireland final against Kilkenny went to two replays, however, O'Grady claimed a third winners' medal after the 5-08 to 3-04 victory in the third game. It was his last championship game for Cork.

== Personal life and death ==
O'Grady was born in Buttevant, County Cork, the youngest of six surviving children of local plasterer Philip and Mary (née Ahern). After completing his education, he joined the Irish Army and was based in Collins Barracks in Cork. He later worked as a welder with Henry Ford & Son Ltd. O'Grady married Margaret Rea from Sunday's Well in the North Cathedral in August 1932. They lived in a house in the Glen and had three children.

On 2 August 1980, O'Grady died aged 77 at the Victoria Hospital in Cork.

== Honours ==
Blackrock

- Cork Senior Hurling Championship (3): 1929, 1930, 1931

Cork

- All-Ireland Senior Hurling Championship (3): 1928, 1929, 1931
- Munster Senior Hurling Championship (3): 1928, 1929, 1931
