= 1888 Cork Senior Hurling Championship =

Annual hurling competition season

- Dates: 3 March 1888 – 29 April 1888
- Teams: 35
- Champions: Tower St. (1st title); William Gleeson (captain)
- Runners-up: Ballygarvan; Timothy Stanton (captain)

The 1888 Cork Senior Hurling Championship was the second staging of the Cork Senior Hurling Championship since its establishment by the Cork County Board in 1887. The draw for the opening round fixtures took place on 21 February 1888. The championship began on 3 March 1888 and ended on 29 April 1888. Due to the increased number of teams taking part, a divisional system was used.

Cork Nationals were the defending champions, however, they were beaten by St. Finbarr's 2nd 21.

On 29 April 1888, Tower St. won the championship following a 4–1 to 0–1 defeat of Ballygarvan in the final. This remains the club's only championship title.

== Participating teams ==
Cork city	East Cork	North-East Cork	North Cork	South Cork	Mid-Cork
Blackrock Douglas Greenmount St. Finbarr's 1st 21 St. Finbarr's 2nd 21 St Mary's St. Peter's and Paul's Tower Street	Aghada 1st 21 Aghada 2nd 21 Caherlag Carrigtwohill Cloyne Dungourney Killeagh and Inch Little Island Queenstown	Ballyhooly Bartlemy Glenville	Ballyhea Buttevant Charleville Mallow	Ballinhassig Ballygarvan Carrigaline Crosshaven Passage Tracton	Aghabullogue Blarney Carrigrohane Grenagh Inniscarra

== Results ==
=== Cork city ===
4 March 1888 First round	Cork Nationals	w/o -scr.	St Mary's	Cork Park

4 March 1888 First round	St. Finbarr's 2nd 21	1-07 - 0-00	Greenmount	Cork Park

18 March 1888 First round	St. Finbarr's 1st 21	7-04 - 0-00	St. Peter's and Paul's	Cork Park

18 March 1888 First round	Douglas	0-00 - 3-08	Tower Street	Cork Park

25 March 1888 Semi-final	St. Finbarr's 2nd 21	1-00 - 0-03	Cork Nationals	Cork Park

25 March 1888 Semi-final	Tower Street	2-01 - 0-03	St. Finbarr's 1st 21	Cork Park

8 April 1888 Final	Tower Street	2-05 - 0-00	St. Finbarr's 2nd 21	Cork Park

=== East Cork ===
4 March 1888 First round	Carrigtwohill	3-05 - 0-00	Killeagh and Inch	Midleton Enclosure

4 March 1888 First round	Queenstown	0-00 - 2-05	Caherlag	Midleton Enclosure

11 March 1888 First round	Dungourney	0-01 - 0-03	Cloyne	Midleton Enclosure

11 March 1888 First round	Aghada 1st 21	w/o - scr.	Aghada 2nd 21	Midleton Enclosure

18 March 1888 Second round	Little Island	2-02 - 3-00	Carrigtwohill	Midleton Enclosure

25 March 1888 Semi-final	Aghada	3-04 - 1-02	Carrigtwohill	Midleton Enclosure

25 March 1888 Semi-final	Caherlag	1-01 - 1-03	Cloyne	Midleton Enclosure

8 April 1888 Final	Aghada	1-05 - 0-00	Cloyne	Queenstown Enclosure

=== North-East Cork ===
4 March 1888 Semi-final	Glenville	0-01 - 1-02	Bartlemy	Fermoy Enclosure

April 1888 Final	Ballyhooly	v	Bartlemy	Fermoy Enclosure

=== North Cork ===
Semi-final	Mallow	v	Buttevant	Buttevant Enclosure

Semi-final	Ballyhea	v	Charleville	Buttevant Enclosure

Final	v	Buttevant Enclosure

=== South Cork ===
4 March 1888 First round	Carrigaline	1-00 - 0-02	Tracton	Carrigaline Enclosure

4 March 1888 First round	Ballygarvan	5-03 - 0-00	Crosshaven	Carrigaline Enclosure

11 March 1888 First round	Ballinhassig	0-01 - 0-02	Passage	Carrigaline Enclosure

11 March 1888 Second round	Ballygarvan	1-01 - 0-00	Carrigaline	Carrigaline Enclosure

18 March 1888 Final	Ballygarvan	1-02 - 1-00	Passage	Carrigaline Enclosure

=== Mid-Cork ===
4 March 1888 First round	Carrigrohane	0-01 - 2-05	Inniscarra	Cloghroe Enclosure

11 March 1888 First round	Aghabullogue	0-00 - 0-00	Blarney	Cloghroe Enclosure

11 March 1888 First round	Aghinagh	0-04 - 1-01	Grenagh	Cloghroe Enclosure

25 March 1888 First round replay	Aghabullogue	0-02 - 2-01	Blarney	Cloghroe Enclosure

25 March 1888 Second round	Inniscarra	3-04 - 0-00	Grenagh	Cloghroe Enclosure

8 April 1888 Final	Inniscarra	0-00 - 0-00	Blarney	Cloghroe Enclosure

14 April 1888 Final replay	Inniscarra	1-01 - 0-00	Blarney	Cloghroe Enclosure

=== Knockout stage ===
==== First round ====
8 April 1888 First round	Buttevant	2-02 - 0-00 (declared void)	Bartlemy	Mallow Town Park

14 April 1888 First round refixture	Buttevant	v	Bartlemy	Mallow Town Park

15 April 1888 First round	Ballygarvan	1-01 - 0-00	Aghada	Cork Park

15 April 1888 First round	Tower Street	3-05 - 0-00	Inniscarra	Cork Park

==== Semi-finals ====
22 April 1888 Semi-final	Tower Street	0-03 - 0-00	Buttevant	The Glen Field

22 April 1888 Semi-final	Ballygarvan	0-03 - 0-00	Bartlemy	Cork Park

==== Final ====
29 April 1888 Final	Tower Street	4-01 - 0-01	Ballygarvan	Cork Park

== Championship statistics ==
=== Miscellaneous ===
- In the first round of the Cork city division, Cork Nationals received a walkover from St Mary's after the latter were only able to field 14 players.
- The Aghabullogue-Blarney tie in the Mid-Cork division ended in a scoreless draw, however, Aghabullogue were declared the winners after being adjudged to haven been the better team.
- Ballygarvan qualify for the final for the first time.
