= 1960 Cork Intermediate Hurling Championship =

Irish hurling competition

- Champions: Passage (3rd title)
- Runners-up: St. Vincent's

The 1960 Cork Intermediate Hurling Championship was the 51st staging of the Cork Intermediate Hurling Championship since its establishment by the Cork County Board in 1909.

On 4 September 1960, Passage won the championship following a 3–07 to 1–08 defeat of St. Vincent's in the final at Riverstick Sportsfield. This was their third championship title overall and their first title since 1930.

== Results ==
=== First round ===
17 April 1960 First round	Ballymartle	v	Tracton	Kinsale Grounds

8 May 1960 First round	St. Vincent's	0-07 - 0-02	St. Finbarr's	The Mardyke

22 May 1960 First round	Newtownshandrum	0-06 - 2-05	Midleton	Páirc Mac Gearailt

22 May 1960 First round	Cobh	2-00 - 4-08	Glen Rovers	Riverstown Sportsfield

=== Quarter-finals ===
24 April 1960 Quarter-final	Carrigaline	5-10 - 6-03	Fermoy	Cork Athletic Grounds

22 June 1960 Quarter-final	University College Cork	0-03 - 5-14	Passage	Carrigaline Grounds

26 June 1960 Quarter-final	St. Vincent's	5-06 - 1-04	Ballymartle	Carrigaline Grounds

26 June 1960 Quarter-final	Midleton	2-12 - 4-04	Glen Rovers	Riverstown Sportsfield

=== Semi-finals ===
10 July 1960 Semi-final	St. Vincent's	2-11 - 2-06	Midleton	Cork Athletic Grounds

10 July 1960 Semi-final	Carrigaline	6-09 - 4-08; Match declared void and awarded to Passage after an objection	Passage	Douglas Grounds

=== Final ===
4 September 1960 Final	Passage	3-07 - 1-08	St. Vincent's	Riverstick Sportsfield

== Championship statistics ==
=== Miscellaneous ===
- Carrigaline were thrown out of the championship after qualifying for the final after an objection by Passage was upheld by the County Board. The objection was lodged by Passage on the grounds that one of the Carrigaline players had played foreign games.
