= Tower Street GAA =

Gaelic games club in County Cork, Ireland

Tower Street
- Sráid Túr
- Founded: 1886
- County: Cork
- Colours

Playing kits
Standard colours

Senior Club Championships
	All Ireland	Munster champions	Cork champions
Hurling:	0	0	1

Tower Street GAA Club was a Gaelic Athletic Association club in Cork, Ireland. The club was affiliated to the Cork County Board and was solely concerned with the game of hurling.

== History ==
Located in the Tower Street area on the southside of Cork, Tower Street GAA Club was one of the 21 clubs that affiliated to the Cork County Board at its inaugural meeting in December 1886. The new club reached the semi-final stage of the 1887 Cork SHC, where they lost to Passage. Tower Street won the Cork SHC the following year, following a 4–01 to 0–01 win over Ballygarvan in the final. This victory also saw the club represent Cork in the inter-county series of games and win the 1888 Munster SHC title after receiving a walkover from Clare. Tower Street went into decline following these victories and eventually disbanded, with many of their players joining the nearby Redmonds club.

== Honours ==
- Munster Senior Hurling Championships (1): 1888
- Cork Senior Hurling Championships (1): 1888

== Notable player ==
- William Gleeson
