= 1930 Cork Intermediate Hurling Championship =

Irish hurling competition

- Champions: Passage (2nd title); R. Lester (captain)
- Runners-up: Buttevant

The 1930 Cork Intermediate Hurling Championship was the 21st staging of the Cork Intermediate Hurling Championship since its establishment by the Cork County Board.

The final was played on 18 January 1931 at the Athletic Grounds in Cork, between Passage and Buttevant, in what was their first ever meeting in the final. Passage won the match by 4–01 to 1–03 to claim their second championship title overall and a first championship title in six years.

== Results ==
=== Final ===
18 January 1931 Final	Passage	4-01 - 1-03	Buttevant	Cork Athletic Grounds
