= 1924 Cork Intermediate Hurling Championship =

Irish hurling competition

- Champions: Passage (1st title)
- Runners-up: Sarsfields

The 1924 Cork Intermediate Hurling Championship was the 15th staging of the Cork Intermediate Hurling Championship since its establishment by the Cork County Board in 1909.

The final was played on 1 February 1925 at the Mardyke in Cork, between Passage and Sarsfields, in what was their first ever meeting in the final. Ballincollig won the match by 3–00 to 2–00 to claim their first ever championship title.

== Results ==
=== Final ===
1 February 1925 Final	Passage	3-00 - 2-00	Sarsfields	The Mardyke
