= 1927 Cork Senior Hurling Championship =

Annual hurling competition season

- Dates: 27 March 1927 – 27 November 1927
- Teams: 13
- Champions: Blackrock (18th title); Seán Óg Murphy (captain)
- Runners-up: Redmonds; B. Mullins (captain)

Tournament statistics
- Matches played: 11
- Goals scored: 64 (5.82 per match)
- Points scored: 60 (5.45 per match)

The 1927 Cork Senior Hurling Championship was the 39th staging of the Cork Senior Hurling Championship since its establishment by the Cork County Board in 1887. The draw for the opening round fixtures took place on 23 February 1927. The championship began on 27 March 1927 and ended on 27 November 1927.

St. Finbarr's were the defending champions.

On 27 November 1927, Blackrock won the championship following a 5–5 to 2–1 defeat of Redmonds in the final. This was their 18th championship title overall and their first title in two championship seasons.

== Team changes ==
=== To Championship ===
Promoted from the Cork Intermediate Hurling Championship

- Kinsale

== Results ==
=== First round ===
27 March 1927 First round	University College Cork	10-06 - 0-01	Passage	Cork Athletic Grounds, Cork

3 April 1927 First round	Kinsale	4-00 - 4-03	Glen Rovers	The Mardyke, Cork

17 April 1927 First round	Mallow	3-01 - 2-00	Midleton	Fermoy Sportsfield, Fermoy

1 May 1927 First round	Sarsfields	5-03 - 1-03	Shamrocks	Turners Cross, Cork

15 May 1927 First round	St. Finbarr's	1-00 - 4-02	Blackrock	Cork Athletic Grounds, Cork

22 May 1927 First round	Carrigtwohill	2-01 - 3-08	Collins	Riverstown Sportsfield, Sallybrook

- Redmonds received a bye in this round.

=== Second round ===
29 May 1927 Second round	Redmonds	3-02 - 1-01	Glen Rovers	The Mardyke, Cork

10 July 1927 Second round	Mallow	4-00 - 2-10	Collins	The Mardyke, Cork

17 July 1927 Second round	Blackrock	2-06 - 2-02	University College Cork	Cork Athletic Grounds, Cork

=== Semi-finals ===
31 July 1927 Semi-final	Sarsfields	2-02 - 2-03	Redmonds	Turners Cross, Cork

2 October 1927 Semi-final	Collins	7-04 - 2-06 (declared void)	Blackrock	Cork Athletic Grounds, Cork

=== Final ===
27 November 1927 Final	Blackrock	5-05 – 2-01	Redmonds	The Mardyke, Cork

=== Miscellaneous ===
- Redmonds qualify for the final for the last time.
