= 1979 Cork Senior Hurling Championship =

Annual hurling competition season

- Dates: 8 April – 7 October 1979
- Teams: 15
- Champions: Blackrock (28th title); Tim Murphy (captain); Joe McGrath; Tim Murphy (manager)
- Runners-up: St. Finbarr's; Jimmy Barry-Murphy (captain); Jim Power (manager)

Tournament statistics
- Matches played: 32
- Goals scored: 143 (4.47 per match)
- Points scored: 653 (20.41 per match)
- Top scorer(s): John Fenton (5-45)

The 1979 Cork Senior Hurling Championship was the 91st staging of the Cork Senior Hurling Championship since its establishment by the Cork County Board in 1887. The championship began on 8 April 1979 and ended on 7 October 1979.

Blackrock entered the championship as the defending champions.

The final was played on 7 October 1979 at Páirc Uí Chaoimh in Cork, between Blackrock and St. Finbarr's, in what was their first meeting in the final in five years. Blackrock won the match by 2–14 to 2–06 to claim their 28th championship title overall, their second title in succession and their fifth of the decade.

Midleton's John Fenton was the championship's top scorer with 5-45.

== Team changes ==
=== To Championship ===
Promoted from the Cork Intermediate Hurling Championship

- Midleton

== Results ==
=== Division 1 ===
==== Table ====
Pos	Team	Pld	W	D	L	SF	SA	Diff	Pts
1	St. Finbarr's	3	2	1	0	7-41	6-20	+24	5
2	Blackrock	3	2	0	1	8-36	2-36	+18	4
3	Glen Rovers	3	1	1	1	8-29	4-29	+12	3
4	Sarsfields	3	0	0	3	4-21	15-42	-54	0
Green background The two top-placed teams qualified for the semi-final stage of the championship proper. Yellow background The third-placed team qualified for the quarter-final stage of the championship proper.

==== Results ====
11 April 1979	St. Finbarr's	5-14 - 3-05	Sarsfields	Páirc Uí Chaoimh, Cork
	J Barry-Murphy 2-3, C Ryan 1-4, J O'Shea 1-1, M Kennedy 1-0, C McCarthy 0-3, J Cremin 0-2, J Allen 0-1.		T Murphy 1-2, P O'Riordan 1-0, E Kelleher 1-0, B Óg Murphy 0-2, B Lotty 0-1.	Referee: F Murphy (Blackrock)

26 April 1979	Blackrock	2-12 - 1-10	Glen Rovers	Páirc Uí Chaoimh, Cork
	É O'Donoghue 1-2, P Moylan 0-5, F Delaney 1-0, J Horgan 0-1, R Cummins 0-1, T Lyons 0-1, D Collins 0-1, É O'Sullivan 0-1.		T O'Neill 1-1, K O'Keeffe 0-4, P O'Doherty 0-3, P Horgan 0-1, J Buckley 0-1.	Referee: P Cronin (St. Finbarr's)

8 June 1979	St. Finbarr's	1-09 - 1-09	Glen Rovers	Páirc Uí Chaoimh, Cork
	C Ryan 1-0, C McCarthy 0-3, J Cremin 0-3, G McCarthy 0-1, J Barry-Murphy 0-1, J Allen 0-1.		P Horgan 0-7, T Collins 1-0, D Coughlan 0-1, J Buckley 0-1.	Referee: M O'Flaherty (Blackrock)

15 June 1979	Blackrock	4-18 - 0-08	Sarsfields	Páirc Uí Chaoimh, Cork
	P Kavanagh 1-3, P Moylan 0-6, F Cummins 1-1, É O'Donoghue 1-1, T Lyons 1-0, D Collins 0-2, E O'Sullivan 0-2, J Horgan 0-1, P Butler 0-1, D Buckley 0-1.		B Óg Murphy 0-5, T Murphy 0-2, J Darcy.	Referee: D O'Connor (Bishopstown)

18 July 1979	Glen Rovers	6-10 - 1-08	Sarsfields	Church Road, Blackrock
	K O'Keeffe 1-4, J O'Callaghan 1-2, P Horgan 1-1, T Collins 1-1, T O'Neill 1-0, L Mulcahy 1-0, J BUckley 0-1, JJ O'Neill 0-1.		B Óg Murphy 0-6, P O'Riordan 1-0, S O'Farrell 0-1, E Kelleher 0-1.

21 August 1979	Blackrock	2-06 - 1-18	St. Finbarr's	Páirc Uí Chaoimh, Cork
	É O'Donoghue 1-0, P Kavanagh 1-0, P Moylan 0-2, D Collins 0-2, R Cummins 0-1, F Cummins 0-1.		J Allen 0-7, J Barry-Murphy 1-2, J Cremin 0-4, T Maher 0-2, C McCarthy 0-1, B O'Brien 0-1, J Murphy 0-1.	Referee: D O'Connor (Bishopstown)

=== Division 2 ===
==== Table ====
Pos	Team	Pld	W	D	L	SF	SA	Diff	Pts
1	Midleton	5	4	1	0	13-65	13-49	+16	9
2	Youghal	5	3	0	2	16-54	6-59	+25	6
3	University College Cork	5	3	0	2	9-63	8-50	+16	6
4	Na Piarsaigh	5	2	1	2	14-50	12-45	+11	5
5	Nemo Rangers	5	1	0	4	12-32	13-67	-38	2
6	Bandon	5	1	0	4	6-54	18-42	-24	2
Green background The two top-placed teams qualified for the quarter-final stage of the championship proper.

==== Results ====
8 April 1979	Midleton	1-16 - 3-09	Youghal	Castlemartyr
	J Fenton 1-7, T McCarthy 0-4, G Glavin 0-2, S O'Brien 0-1, D Mulcahy 0-1, K Hennessy 0-1.		M Butler 2-1, S O'Leary 1-3, T Coyne 0-3, A O'Regan 0-1, H Fouhy 0-1.	Referee: J Motherway (Aghada)

8 April 1979	University College Cork	3-13 - 1-11	Bandon	Ballinhassig
	M Kelleher 1-2, P Curran 1-2, P O'Leary 1-0, B Waldron 0-3, S Feehan 0-2, J Higgins 0-2, N Leonard 0-1, B Dineen 0-1.		J Fitzgerald 1-2, P Crowley 0-4, K O'Driscoll 0-2, N Crowley 0-2, G O'Mahony 0-1.	Referee: P Cronin (St. Finbarr's)

22 April 1979	University College Cork	2-11 - 0-11	Na Piarsaigh	Páirc Uí Chaoimh, Cork
	B Waldron 0-7, P Curran 1-1, J Greally 1-1, J Minogue 0-1, J Higgins 0-1.		P Barry 0-5, D Murphy 0-4, John O'Sullivan 0-2.	Referee: M Flaherty (Blackrock)

22 April 1979	Midleton	3-11 - 1-10	Bandon	Páirc Uí Chaoimh, Cork
	J Fenton 1-6, S Farrell 1-0, J Hurley 1-0, S O'Brien 0-2, K Hennessy 0-1, T McCarthy 0-1, G Glavin 0-1.		P Crowley 0-6, K O'Driscoll 1-1, F Crowley 0-1, J Fitzgerald 0-1, J Murphy 0-1.	Referee: W Horgan (Brian Dillons)

28 April 1979	Youghal	3-12 - 1-11	University College Cork	Clonmult Memorial Park, Midleton
	S O'Leary 3-2, M Coyne 0-6, H Fuohy 0-3, S Ring 0-1.		B Waldron 0-8, J Greally 1-1, J Minogue 0-1, P Curran 0-1.	Referee: J Motherway (Aghada)

5 May 1979	Youghal	3-17 - 0-05	Nemo Rangers	Castlemartyr
	S O'Leary 2-5, C Hennessy 1-3, M Coyne 0-5, M Butler 1-0, S Ring 0-2, M Walsh 0-1, H Fuohy 0-1.		D Calnan 0-2, J Barry 0-1, W Barry 0-1, D Barry 0-1.	Referee: J Motherway (Aghada)

16 May 1979	Na Piarsaigh	3-09 - 3-06	Nemo Rangers	Ballinlough
	D Murphy 1-3, John O'Sullivan 1-1, W O'Connell 1-0, R McDonnell 0-2, Jim O'Sullivan 0-1, G Whooley 0-1, V Twomey 0-1.		P O'Callaghan 2-3, W Barry 1-1, G Dullea 0-1, S Hayes 0-1.	Referee: M O'Flaherty (Blackrock)

20 May 1979	Nemo Rangers	2-08 - 0-11	Bandon	Kinsale
	D Calnan 2-3, D Murphy 0-1, P O'Sullivan 0-1, W Barry 0-1, D O'Sullivan 0-1.		F Crowley 0-4, K O'Driscoll 0-2, J Murphy 0-2, N Crowley 0-2, PJ O'Mahony 0-1.	Referee: M Keane (Cloughduv)

9 June 1979	Midleton	5-13 - 5-08	Nemo Rangers	Riverstown
	K Hennessy 3-1, J Fenton 0-6, G Glavin 1-1, S O'Farrell 1-0, T McCarthy 0-3, G Smith 0-1, J Barry 0-1.		D Calnan 2-6, D Barry 2-0, K Murphy 1-1, W Barry 0-1.	Referee: W Horgan (Brian Dillons)

10 June 1979	Na Piarsaigh	6-10 - 2-04	Bandon	Cloughduv
	John O'Sullivan 1-7, Jim O'Sullivan 3-0, W O'Connell 1-1, R McDonnell 1-0, J Whooley 0-1, D Murphy 0-1.		P Crowley 1-1, D Desmond 1-0, F Crowley 0-2, N Crowley 0-1.	Referee: M English (Bishopstown)

24 June 1979	Bandon	2-18 - 4-06	Youghal	Páirc Uí Chaoimh, Cork
	P Crowley 0-12, F Crowley 1-2, G O'Mahony 1-1, K O'Driscoll 0-2, PJ O'Mahony 0-1.		S O'Leary 2-0, A Coyne 1-0, M Butler 1-0, M Coyne 0-2, R O'Sullivan 0-2, H Fouhy 0-2.

27 June 1979	University College Cork	2-17 - 2-05	Nemo Rangers	Ballinlough
	M Kelleher 2-1, B Waldron 0-7, J Higgins 0-4, E Murphy 0-2, P Fleming 0-1, J Greally 0-1, P O'Leary 0-1.		D Allen 1-2, J O'Neill 1-0, K Murphy 0-1, D Murphy 0-1, E Donnellan 0-1.	Referee: M English (Bishopstown)

14 July 1979	Youghal	3-10 - 2-09	Na Piarsaigh	Páirc Uí Chonaill, Cobh
	M Butler 2-0, M Coyne 0-6, T Coyne 1-1, S O'Leary 0-2, R O'Sullivan 0-1.		John O'Sullivan 2-6, R McDonnell 0-1, D Murphy 0-1, T McDonnell 0-1.	Referee: J Motherway (Aghada)

20 July 1979	Midleton	2-11 - 1-11	University College Cork	Carrigtwohill
	J Fenton 2-7, K Hennessy 0-2, J Smith 0-1, G Glavin 0-1.		B Waldron 0-4, M Kelleher 1-0, B Greally 0-2, J Higgins 0-2, P O'Leary 0-1, J Boylan 0-1, P Fleming 0-1.	Referee: M O'Flaherty (Blackrock)

17 August 1979	Midleton	2-14 - 3-11	Na Piarsaigh	Páirc Uí Chonaill, Cobh
	J Fenton 1-8, K Hennessy 1-1, D Mulcahy 0-1, T McCarthy 0-1, G Smith 0-1, S O'Brien 0-1, J Hurley 0-1.		W O'Connell 2-2, D Murphy 1-2, John O'Sullivan 0-4, V Twomey 0-1, M O'Sullivan 0-1, P Murphy 0-1.

==== Play-off ====
25 August 1979 Play-off	Youghal	3-09 - 1-08	University College Cork	Clonmult Memorial Park, Midleton
	T Coyne 2-1, M Butler 1-1, M Coyne 0-3, S O'Leary 0-1, M Walsh 0-1, R O'Sullivan 0-1, C Hennessy 0-1.		J Higgins 1-2, B Waldron 0-3, P Curran 0-1, J Greally 0-1, P Fleming 0-1.	Referee: J Motherway (Aghada)

=== Division 3 ===
First round

29 April 1979 First round	Imokilly	0-12 - 1-12	Muskerry	Páirc Uí Chaoimh, Cork
	M White 0-3, W Kearney 0-3, M Lynch 0-2, S O'Mahony 0-1, T Fogarty 0-1, K Lane 0-1, P O'Connor 0-1.		D Desmond 0-6, T Deasy 1-1, S Noonan 0-2, T Hourihan 0-1, T Dunne 0-1, J Lucey 0-1.	Referee: M O'Flaherty (Blackrock)

29 April 1979 First round	Seandún	2-05 - 4-06	Carrigdhoun	Manning Park, Passage
	W Murphy 1-3, P O'Sullivan 1-0, S Lucey 0-1, D Keane 0-1.		G Hanley 2-4, D Coleman 1-0, K O'Donovan 1-0, B Coleman 0-2.	Referee: J O'Riordan (Bandon)

Semi-finals

10 June 1979 Semi-final	Carbery	3-09 - 4-14	Avondhu	Páirc Uí Chaoimh, Cork
	P O'Leary 2-1, D Healy 1-1, S O'Neill 0-4, D Noonan 0-2, P Brennan 0-1.		S O'Gorman 2-3, D Ryan 1-5, G Regan 1-1, D Relihan 0-2, G Madigan 0-2, D Herlihy 0-1.	Referee: M O'Flaherty (Blackrock)

16 June 1979 Semi-final	Carrigdhoun	1-11 - 0-08	Muskerry	Church Road, Blackrock
	K O'Donovan 1-4, G Hanley 0-3, JL O'Sullivan 0-1, G Webb 0-1, B Coleman 0-1, W Coleman 0-1.		D Desmond 0-4, J O'Leary 0-2, J Coakley 0-1, F Deasy 0-1.	Referee: P Cronin (St. Finbarr's)

Final

21 July 1979 Final	Avondhu	3-11 - 3-06	Carrigdhoun	Riverstown
	T Sheehan 1-6, D Coughlan 1-1, D Relihan 1-0, D Herlihy 0-2, P Buckley 0-2.		F Tobin 2-0, G Hanley 0-5, D Dunne 1-0, B Coleman 0-1.	Referee: W Horgan (Brian Dillons)

=== Knock-out stage ===
Quarter-finals

9 September 1979 Quarter-final	Midleton	4-11 - 4-04	Youghal	Castlemartyr
	K Hennessy 3-5, G Glavin 1-0, J Fenton 0-3, T McCarthy 0-3.		S O'Leary 3-1, S Fitzgerald 1-1, R O'Sullivan 0-1, S Ring 0-1.	Referee: M O'Flaherty (Blackrock)

9 September 1979 Quarter-final	Glen Rovers	2-11 - 0-09	Avondhu	Castlelyons
	L Mulcahy 1-1, J O'Brien 1-0, J O'Neill 0-3, P Doherty 0-2, K O'Keeffe 0-2, J Buckley 0-1, P Horgan 0-1, D O'Donovan 0-1.		J Browne 0-3, S Gorman 0-3, D Coughlan 0-1, P Buckley 0-1, D Ryan 0-1.	Referee: F Murphy (Blackrock)

Semi-finals

22 September 1979 Semi-final	Blackrock	4-09 - 0-11	Glen Rovers	Páirc Uí Chaoimh, Cork
	R Cummins 1-2, D Buckley 1-2, É O'Donoghue 1-1, É O'Sullivan 1-1, P Moylan 0-2, P Kavanagh 0-1.		P Horgan 0-6, K O'Keeffe 0-2, J Buckley 0-2, D Coughlan 0-1.	Referee: J O'Riordan (Bandon)

23 September 1979 Semi-final	St. Finbarr's	2-10 - 1-12	Midleton	Riverstown
	T Maher 1-1, E Fitzpatrick 1-0, C Ryan 0-3, C McCarthy 0-3, G McCarthy 0-2, J Barry-Murphy 0-1.		J Fenton 0-8, S O'Farrell 1-0, D Mulcahy 0-2, K Hennessy 0-1, K Murley 0-1.	Referee: W Horgan (Brian Dillons)

Final

7 October 1979 Final	Blackrock	2-14 - 2-06	St. Finbarr's	Páirc Uí Chaoimh, Cork
	P Moylan 0-5, T Lyons 1-1, É O'Sullivan 1-0, É O'Donoghue 0-3, T Cashman 0-2, F Cummins 0-2, R Cummins 0-1.		C McCarthy 0-4, É Fitzpatrick 1-0, J Allen 1-0, B O'Brien 0-1, C Ryan 0-1.	Referee: S O'Grady (Limericky)

== Championship statistics ==
=== Top scorers ===
Top scorers overall

Rank	Player	Club	Tally	Total	Matches	Average
1	John Fenton	Midleton	5-45	60	7	8.57
2	Seánie O'Leary	Youghal	11-14	47	7	6.71
3	Kevin Hennessy	Midleton	7-12	33	7	4.71
4	John O'Sullivan	Na Piarsaigh	4-20	32	5	6.40
4	Brian Waldron	UCC	0-32	32	6	5.33
6	Pádraig Crowley	Bandon	1-23	26	4	6.50
7	Mick Butler	Youghal	7-02	23	6	3.83
7	Dan Calnan	Nemo Rangers	4-11	23	4	5.75
9	Mick Coyne	Youghal	0-22	22	7	3.14
10	Pat Moylan	Blackrock	0-20	20	5	4.00

Top scorers in a single game

Rank	Player	Club	Tally	Total	Opposition
1	Kevin Hennessy	Midleton	3-05	14	Youghal
2	John Fenton	Midleton	2-07	13	UCC
3	Dan Calnan	Nemo Rangers	2-06	12	Midleton
3	John O'Sullivan	Na Piarsaigh	2-06	12	Youghal
3	Pádraig Crowley	Bandon	0-12	12	Youghal
6	Seánie O'Leary	Youghal	3-02	11	UCC
6	Seánie O'Leary	Youghal	2-05	11	Nemo Rangers
6	John Fenton	Midleton	1-08	11	Na Piarsaigh
9	Kevin Hennessy	Midleton	3-01	10	Nemo Rangers
9	Seánie O'Leary	Youghal	3-01	10	Midleton
9	Ger Hanley	Carrigdhoun	2-04	10	Seandún
9	John Fenton	Midleton	1-07	10	Youghal
9	John O'Sullivan	Na Piarsaigh	1-07	10	Bandon

=== Miscellaneous ===
- Midleton return to the senior championship for the first time since 1964.
