= 1956 Cork Senior Hurling Championship =

Annual hurling competition season

- Dates: 8 April – 15 October 1956
- Teams: 16
- Champions: Blackrock (22nd title); Mick Cashman (captain)
- Runners-up: Glen Rovers; Donie O'Donovan (captain)

Tournament statistics
- Matches played: 15
- Goals scored: 108 (7.2 per match)
- Points scored: 204 (13.6 per match)
- Top scorer(s): Pat Healy (8-03)

The 1956 Cork Senior Hurling Championship was the 68th staging of the Cork Senior Hurling Championship since its establishment by the Cork County Board in 1887. The championship ended on 14 October 1956.

St. Finbarr's entered the championship as the defending champions.

On 14 October 1956, Blackrock won the championship following a 2–10 to 2–02 defeat of Glen Rovers in the final. This was their 22nd championship title overall and their first title since 1931.

Pat Healy was the championship's top scorer with 8-03.

== Team changes ==
=== To Championship ===
Promoted from the Cork Intermediate Hurling Championship

- Youghal

=== From Championship ===
Regraded to the Cork Intermediate Hurling Championship

- Bandon
- Shanballymore

Declined to field a team

- Imokilly

== Results ==
=== First round ===
8 April 1956 First round	Seandún	8-08 - 4-04	Muskerry	Coachford Sportsfield
	C O'Shea 2-0, P Coughlan 1-3, T O'Leary 1-3, T O'Flynn 1-1, T O'Sullivan 1-0, T Donoghue 1-0, F Maxwell 0-1.		P Cremin 3-1, T O'Riordan 1-0, O'Gorman 0-2, S Morrissey 0-1.	Referee: T Ó Tuama (Glen Rovers)

8 April 1956 First round	Carrigdhoun	7-10 - 4-04	Youghal	Cork Athletic Grounds, Cork
	J O'Sullivan 3-0, C Cooney 2-1, D Deasy 1-1, S Kelly 0-2, J Cooney 0-2, N Hartnett 0-1, S Mahony 0-1, C Nyhan 0-1, T Kelly 0-1.		J Coyne 1-1, P Curley 1-0, D O'Sullivan 1-0, J Cotter 0-2, J Dempsey 0-1.	Referee: D Owens (St. Nicholas')

29 April 1956 First round	University College Cork	7-06 - 5-05	Newtownshandrum	Buttevant Sportsfield
	J McCarthy 2-1, L Forrestal 2-1, J Dwane 2-0, S Long 1-0, J Moore 1-0, P Horgan 0-1.		J Lyons 2-0, T Galvin 1-1, B Galvin 1-0, J Browne 0-1.

29 April 1956 First round	Midleton	3-08 - 2-08	Nemo Rangers	Clonmult Memorial Park
	G Power 1-2, D Falvey 1-2, E Moriarty 1-1, D O'Brien 0-2, T O'Sullivan 0-1.		P O'Keeffe 1-3, G Allen 1-1, F Noonan 0-2, M Murphy 0-1, Lynch 0-1.	Referee: P O'Leary (Sarsfields)

13 May 1956 First round	Duhallow	1-03 - 2-10	Carbery	Macroom Sportsfield
	D Sullivan 1-0, D Curtis 0-2, D Nolan 0-1.		N Ahern 1-2, D Mahony 1-2, J Collins 0-2, A Scannell 0-2, J Riordan 0-1, J Fitzgerald 0-1.

13 May 1956 First round	Avondhu	2-04 - 4-10	Glen Rovers	Bishop Casey Memorial Park
	R Browne 1-0, O'Sullivan 1-0, O'Toole 0-2, M Fahy 0-1, McAuliffe 0-1,		C Ring 2-4, Healy 2-2, J Clifford 1-2, J Hartnett 0-1.

20 May 1956 First round	Carrigtwohill	3-07 - 5-11	St. Finbarr's	Riverstown Sportsfield
	L O'Driscoll 2-1, S Butler 1-1, K Tabb 0-2, G McCarthy 0-1, J O'Connor 0-1.		M Finn 1-8, C Maher 2-1, J O'Sullivan 1-0, J Ring 1-0, M Ryan 0-1.	Referee: T Ó Tuama (Glen Rovers)

24 June 1956 First round	Sarsfields	2-05 - 3-10	Blackrock	The Mardyke
	P Barry 1-2, R Lotty 1-1, W Walsh 0-1, L Dowling 0-1.		S Horgan 3-1, F O'Mahony 0-3, M Murphy 0-2, J Bennett 0-1, J Redmond 0-1, T Furlong 0-1, M Cashman 0-1.	Referee: C Conway (Blarney)

=== Second round ===
19 June 1956 Second round	Glen Rovers	8-10 - 2-02	University College Cork	The Mardyke
	P Healy 4-1, M Cullinane 2-5, C Ring 1-3, J Hartnett 1-1.		R Troy 1-1, J Forrestal 1-0, T Lineen 0-1.	Referee: M Barrett (Nemo Rangers)

8 July 1956 Second round	Carrigdhoun	2-08 - 5-05	St. Finbarr's	Cork Athletic Grounds
	J Cooney 1-2, J O'Sullivan 1-0, N Hartnett 0-2, S O'Mahony 0-1, J West 0-1.		J O'Sullivan 2-1, T Cronin 2-0, C Healy 1-1, M Finn 0-2, M Ryan 0-1.	Referee: C Conway (Blarney)

26 August 1956 Second round	Blackrock	4-10 - 1-04	Midleton	Riverstown Sportsfield
	M Murphy 1-2, S Horgan 1-1, EJ O'Sullivan 1-1, J Aherne 0-3, F O'Mahony 0-1, M Cashman 0-1, P Philpott 0-1.		D O'Brien 1-1, P Fitzgerald 0-2, E Moriarty 0-1.

2 September 1956 Second round	Carbery	4-09 - 4-05	Seandún	Cork Athletic Grounds
	Lehane 3-0, A Scannell 0-5, D O'Donovan 0-1, J Fitzgerald 0-2, White 0-1,		J O'Riordan 2-0, D Terry 1-0, T O'Leary 1-0, C O'Shea 0-2, B O'Shea 0-1, J Coughlan 0-1.	Referee: O Barry (Sarsfields)

=== Semi-finals ===
2 September 1956 Semi-final	Glen Rovers	7-06 - 3-03	St. Finbarr's	Cork Athletic Grounds
	J Daly 2-2, C Ring 2-1, P Healy 2-0, J Hartnett 1-0, J Clifford 0-2, D O'Donovan 0-1.		J Ring 1-0, T Cronin 1-0, C Healy 1-0, M Finn 0-3.

30 September 1956 Semi-final	Blackrock	1-12 - 1-05	Carbery	Cork Athletic Grounds
	J Twomey 1-0, T Furlong 0-3, F O'Mahony 0-3, J Dermody 0-2, EJ O'Sullivan 0-1, S Horgan 0-1, J Redmond 0-1.		R White 1-0, C Corcoran 0-2, D O'Mahony 0-1, J O'Riordan 0-1, A Scannell 0-1.	Referee: O Barry (Sarsfields)

=== Final ===
15 October 1956 Final	Blackrock	2-10 - 2-02	Glen Rovers	Cork Athletic Grounds
	M Murphy 1-3, S Horgan 1-1, J Bennett 0-1, Clifford 0-1, S Hearne 0-1, F O'Mahony 0-1, M Cashman 0-1, T Furlong 0-1.		C Ring 1-0, D O'Donovan 1-0, V Twomey 0-2.

== Championship statistics ==
=== Top scorers ===
Top scorers overall

Rank	Player	Club	Tally	Total	Matches	Average
1	Pat Healy	Glen Rovers	8-03	27	4	6.75
2	Christy Ring	Glen Rovers	6-08	26	4	6.50
3	Séamus Horgan	Blackrock	5-04	19	4	4.75
4	Mossie Finn	St. Finbarr's	1-13	16	3	5.33
5	Mick Murphy	Blackrock	2-07	13	4	3.25

=== Miscellaneous ===
- Youghal make their first appearance at senior level.
- Blackrock win their first title since 1931
