= Seánie O'Leary =

Irish hurler (1952–2021)

Personal information
- Native name: Seán Ó Laoire (Irish)
- Born: 25 February 1952 Youghal, County Cork, Munster, Ireland
- Died: 1 December 2021 (aged 69) Glounthaune, County Cork, Ireland
- Occupation: Agricultural finance manager
- Height: 5 ft 8 in (173 cm)

Sport
- Sport: Hurling
- Position: Left corner-forward
Club
- Years: Club
- 1970–1984: Youghal
Club titles
- Cork titles: 0
Inter-county*
| Years | County | Apps (scores) |
| 1971–1984 | Cork | 36 (30–33) |
Inter-county titles
- Munster titles: 9
- All-Irelands: 4
- NHL: 4
- All Stars: 3
- *Inter County team apps and scores correct as of 17:11, 20 December 2014.

Seán O'Leary (25 February 1952 – 1 December 2021) was an Irish hurler who played as a left corner-forward at senior level for the Cork county team.

== Career ==
Born in Youghal, County Cork, Munster, O'Leary first played competitive hurling whilst at school at St. Colman's College. He arrived on the inter-county scene at the age of seventeen when he first linked up with the Cork minor team, before later joining the under-21 side. He made his senior debut during the 1971 championship. O'Leary went on to play a key part for Cork, and won four All-Ireland medals, nine Munster medals and four National Hurling League medals. He was an All-Ireland runner-up on three occasions.

O'Leary was a member of the Munster inter-provincial team on a number of occasions, however, he ended his career without a Railway Cup medal. At club level he is an intermediate championship medallist with Youghal.

His grandfather, Tom Mahony, was also an All-Ireland medallist with Cork, while his son, Tomás, was an All-Ireland minor-winning captain who played rugby with London Irish.

Throughout his career O'Leary made 36 championship appearances. He retired from inter-county hurling following the conclusion of the 1984 championship.

O'Leary was widely regarded as one of Cork's all-time greatest and most popular players. During his playing days he won three All-Star awards, while he was later chosen as one of the 125 greatest hurlers of all-time in a 2009 poll.

In retirement from playing O'Leary became involved in team management and coaching. After a stint as coach of the Cork under-21 team, he was a two-time All-Ireland-winning selector with the Cork senior team.

O'Leary died on 1 December 2021, at the age of 69.

== Playing career ==
=== Club ===
In 1969 O'Leary was still eligible for the minor grade when he was a member of Youghal's top team that qualified for the final of the intermediate championship. A narrow 3–7 to 0–13 defeat of Cobh gave him a championship medal.

=== Minor and under-21 ===
O'Leary first played for Cork in 1969 when he joined the minor side. He made his debut when he came on as a substitute in the provincial semi-final, before starting the subsequent provincial decider at left corner-forward. O'Leary won his first Munster medal that year following a 1–12 to 2–4 defeat of Tipperary. This victory allowed Cork to advance to an All-Ireland final meeting with Kilkenny. O'Leary finished the game with 1–1 and collected his first All-Ireland medal as Cork triumphed by 2–15 to 3–6.

In 1970 O'Leary collected a second Munster medal as he scored a hat-trick of goals in Cork's 3–8 to 4–4 defeat of Tipperary. The subsequent All-Ireland decider saw Cork face Galway. O'Leary was Cork's joint-top scorer as the team powered to a 5–19 to 2–9 victory. It was his second All-Ireland medal in the minor grade.

O'Leary was still a member of the Cork minor team when he was added to the under-21 side for the All-Ireland decider with Wexford in 1970. He was introduced as a substitute and scored a decisive goal which resulted in Cork salvaging a draw. O'Leary started the replay and collected an All-Ireland medal in that grade as Cork recorded a 5–17 to 0–8 victory in the replay.

In 1971 O'Leary's underage run of success continued when he collected his first Munster medal in the under-21 grade following a 5–11 to 4–9 defeat of Tipperary. For the second successive year Cork faced Wexford in the under-21 All-Ireland decider. Cork dominated the game with goals, beating Wexford by 7–8 to 1–11. It was O'Leary's second All-Ireland medal.

Cork's bid for a fifth successive All-Ireland under-21 crown ended in 1972, however, the team bounced back the following year. A 4–11 to 2–7 defeat of Limerick gave O'Leary a third Munster medal in four seasons. Once again the subsequent All-Ireland decider featured Cork and Wexford. In a close game Cork triumphed by 2–10 to 4–2, with O'Leary securing a third All-Ireland medal. It was his final game in the under-21 grade.

=== Senior ===
==== Beginnings ====
O'Leary made his senior championship debut as a substitute on 4 July 1971 in a 2–16 to 2–14 Munster semi-final defeat by Limerick.

In 1972, O'Leary had his first senior success when he won a National League medal following a 3–14 to 2–14 defeat of Limerick. He later added a Munster medal to his collection following a 6–18 to 2–8 thrashing of Clare. Old rivals Kilkenny provided the opposition in the subsequent All-Ireland final on 3 September 1972. Halfway through the second-half Cork stretched their lead to eight points. Kilkenny's great scoring threat Eddie Keher was deployed closer to goal and finished the game with 2–9. A fifteen-point swing resulted in Kilkenny winning the game by 3–24 to 5–11.

Championship success eluded Cork over the next few years, however, O'Leary won a second league medal in 1974 following a 6–15 to 1–12 defeat of Limerick.

==== Three-in-a-row ====
O'Leary won his second Munster medal in 1975, as Cork defeated three-in-a-row hopefuls Limerick by 3–14 to 0–12. Cork retained the provincial title in 1976 following a 3–15 to 4–5 defeat of Limerick once again. Wexford provided the opposition in the subsequent All-Ireland final on 5 September 1976. Wexford got off to a strong start and were 2–2 to no score ahead after just six minutes. Wexford had a two-point lead with ten minutes to go, however, three points from Jimmy Barry-Murphy, two from Pat Moylan and a kicked effort from Ray Cummins gave Cork a 2–21 to 4–11 victory. It was O'Leary's first All-Ireland medal. He was later presented with his first All-Star.

Cork faced Clare in the provincial decider in 1977, on a day when armed robbers made away with the takings from the gate of £24,579 during the second half of the game. Clare conceded an early penalty but they fought back to take the lead until a contentious red card for full back Jim Power turned the tide for Cork and they fought on to win by 4–15 to 4–10, with O'Leary collecting a fourth winners' medal. The subsequent All-Ireland final on 4 September 1977 was a repeat of the previous year, with Wexford providing the opposition once again. Before the game had even started O'Leary injured himself. During a pre-match warm-up in front of Hill 16 he got hit in the face with a sliotar, suffering a broken nose. He missed the parade before the game due to his injury but played for the full seventy minutes, being described throughout the game by RTÉ commentator Michael O'Hehir as "the man who nearly didn't play". In spite of this injury, O'Leary scored the decisive goal for Cork as the game entered the last quarter, while Martin Coleman brought off a match-winning save from Christy Keogh to foil the Wexford comeback. A 1–17 to 3–8 victory gave him his second All-Ireland medal while he was later presented with a second successive All-Star.

O'Leary's season was hampered at the start of 1978 as he endured a long lay-off after having a kidney removed. He fought back to regain his place on the championship starting fifteen as Cork defeated Waterford in the Munster semi-final. O'Leary missed Cork's provincial triumph, however, he was restored to the team as Cork faced Kilkenny in the All-Ireland decider on 3 September 1978. Cork secured a first three-in-a-row of All-Ireland titles for the first time in over twenty years, as a Jimmy Barry-Murphy goal helped the team to a 1–15 to 2–8 victory over Kilkenny. It was O'Leary's third successive All-Ireland medal.

==== Decline ====
Cork won a record-equaling fifth successive Munster title in 1979, however, O'Leary once again missed the final. Cork's quest for a fourth successive All-Ireland title ended with a semi-final defeat by Galway.

O'Leary added a third league medal to his collection in 1980, as Limerick were defeated after a draw and a replay. A record-breaking sixth successive provincial championship eluded Cork that year, however, O'Leary won a fourth league medal in 1981 as Offaly were defeated by 3–11 to 2–8.

==== Twilight successes ====
In 1982 Cork powered their way through the championship. A decisive 5–21 to 3–6 defeat of Waterford in the provincial decider, with O'Leary scoring four goals, gave him a fifth Munster medal. On 5 September 1982 Cork faced Kilkenny in the All-Ireland decider. Kilkenny surprised many on the day, with Christy Heffernan scoring two goals in a forty-second spell just before the interval. Ger Fennelly got a third goal within eight minutes of the restart, giving Kilkenny a 3–18 to 1–15 victory.

After missing Cork's provincial win in 1983, O'Leary was back on the starting fifteen as Cork faced Kilkenny in a second successive All-Ireland decider on 4 September 1983. Kilkenny used a strong wind to dominate the opening half and built up a lead at the interval. Cork came back with goals by Tomás Mulcahy and O'Leary, however, at the full-time whistle Kilkenny had won by 2–14 to 2–12.

O'Leary had a more settled season in 1984 as Cork booked their place in their third successive Munster decider. Tipperary provided the opposition in the provincial final. With six minutes remaining, Tipperary held a four-point lead. After a John Fenton free reduced the deficit, a goal from substitute Tony O'Sullivan brought the sides level. A subsequent O'Sullivan point attempt was batted away by John Sheedy, however, O'Leary was on hand to send the sliotar to the net for the winning goal. Fenton added a pointed free and Cork had won the game by 4–15 to 3–14, with O'Leary picking up a sixth winners' medal. Cork subsequently faced Offaly in the centenary year All-Ireland decider at Semple Stadium on 2 September 1984. It was the first meeting of these two sides in one hundred years of Gaelic games. The game was a triumph for Cork, who won by 3–16 to 1–12 courtesy of second-half goals by Kevin Hennessy and two by O'Leary. It was O'Leary's fourth All-Ireland medal, while he later picked up a third All-Star.

=== Inter-provincial ===
In 1973 O'Leary was added to the Munster team for the inter-provincial championship. He was an unused substitute that year as Munster faced a 1–13 to 2–8 defeat by Leinster.

== Coaching career ==
=== Imokilly ===
In 1997 O'Leary was coach of the Imokilly divisional side that qualified for a second successive senior championship decider. A 1-18 to 2-12 defeat of Sarsfields secured a first championship title for the east Cork division.

Imokilly repeated their championship success again in 1998. A 1-10 to 1-5 victory over county kingpins Blackrock secured a second successive championship for Imokilly and for O'Leary as coach.

=== Cork ===
O'Leary took his first steps into inter-county management in 1992 when he was appointed coach of the Cork under-21 team. His two-year tenure in charge ended without success.

By 1998 O'Leary was a selector under Jimmy Barry-Murphy with the Cork senior team. That year Cork secured their first silverware in six years when the team won the National League title. The following season proved to be even more successful, with Cork claiming the Munster title following a 1–15 to 0–14 defeat of three-in-a-row hopefuls Clare. Cork later faced Kilkenny in the All-Ireland decider on 12 September 1999. At half time, Cork trailed by 0–5 to 0–4 after a low-scoring first half. Kilkenny increased the pace after the interval, pulling into a four-point lead. Cork responded through Joe Deane, Ben O'Connor and Seánie McGrath, scoring five unanswered points. Kilkenny could only manage one more score – a point from a Henry Shefflin free – and Cork held out to win by 0–13 to 0–12.

Cork secured a second successive Munster title in 2000, as Cork retained their title following a 0–23 to 3–12 defeat of Tipperary. O'Leary and the rest of the management team stepped down after Cork's All-Ireland semi-final defeat by Offaly.

In late 2002 O'Leary was back as a selector with the Cork senior team. In 2003, Cork claimed the Munster title following a 3–16 to 3–12 defeat of Waterford. The subsequent All-Ireland final on 14 September 2003 saw Cork face Kilkenny for the first time in four years. Both teams remained level for much of the game, exchanging tit-for-tat scores. A Setanta Ó hAilpín goal gave Cork the advantage, however, a Martin Comerford goal five minutes from the end settled the game as Kilkenny went on to win by 1–14 to 1–11.

After facing a narrow 3–16 to 1–21 defeat by Waterford in the 2004 Munster final, Cork worked their way through the qualifiers and lined out against Kilkenny in the All-Ireland decider on 12 September 2004. A rain-soaked day made conditions difficult as Kilkenny aimed to secure a third successive championship. The first half was a low-scoring affair, however, the second half saw Cork take over. For the last twenty-three minutes Cork scored nine unanswered points and went on to win the game by 0–17 to 0–9. It was O'Leary's second All-Ireland medal as a selector.

Following the resignation of Dónal O'Grady as manager following this victory, O'Leary was the front-runner to take over the position. The position, however, went to John Allen.

== Career statistics ==
=== Club ===
| Team | Year | Cork SHC | |
| Team | Year | Apps | Score |
|---|---|---|---|
| Youghal | 1970 | 2 | 1-05 |
| Youghal | 1971 | 3 | 6-09 |
| Youghal | 1972 | 4 | 0-16 |
| Youghal | 1973 | 3 | 4-08 |
| Youghal | 1974 | 2 | 2-05 |
| Youghal | 1975 | 2 | 3-04 |
| Youghal | 1976 | 1 | 0-01 |
| Youghal | 1977 | 3 | 0-20 |
| Youghal | 1978 | 3 | 2-07 |
| Youghal | 1979 | 7 | 11-14 |
| Youghal | 1980 | 4 | 1-04 |
| Youghal | 1981 | 2 | 0-02 |
| Youghal | 1982 | x | 0-00 |
| Youghal | 1983 | 4 | 3-04 |
| Youghal | 1984 | 2 | 1-02 |
| Youghal | Total | x | 34-101 |

=== Inter-county ===
| Team | Season | National League | | | Munster | | All-Ireland | | Total | |
| Team | Season | Division | Apps | Score | Apps | Score | Apps | Score | Apps | Score |
|---|---|---|---|---|---|---|---|---|---|---|
| Cork | 1970-71 | Division 1A | 0 | 0-00 | 1 | 0-00 | 0 | 0-00 | 1 | 0-00 |
| Cork | 1971-72 | Division 1A | 10 | 12-05 | 4 | 4-02 | 2 | 4-01 | 16 | 20-08 |
| Cork | 1972-73 | Division 1A | 5 | 4-08 | 1 | 0-00 | 0 | 0-00 | 6 | 4-08 |
| Cork | 1973-74 | Division 1A | 9 | 5-08 | 1 | 1-01 | 0 | 0-00 | 10 | 6-09 |
| Cork | 1974-75 | Division 1A | 3 | 0-01 | 3 | 3-05 | 1 | 0-04 | 7 | 3-10 |
| Cork | 1975-76 | Division 1A | 7 | 6-06 | 2 | 1-04 | 1 | 0-01 | 10 | 7-11 |
| Cork | 1976-77 | Division 1A | 1 | 1-01 | 2 | 2-01 | 2 | 2-04 | 5 | 5-06 |
| Cork | 1977-78 | Division 1A | 1 | 0-00 | 1 | 0-03 | 1 | 0-01 | 3 | 0-04 |
| Cork | 1978-79 | Division 1B | 5 | 3-17 | 1 | 0-00 | 1 | 0-01 | 7 | 3-18 |
| Cork | 1979-80 | Division 1A | 6 | 3-05 | 2 | 2-00 | 0 | 0-00 | 8 | 5-05 |
| Cork | 1980-81 | Division 1A | 4 | 0-02 | 1 | 1-00 | 0 | 0-00 | 5 | 1-02 |
| Cork | 1981-82 | Division 1A | 0 | 0-00 | 3 | 5-02 | 1 | 0-00 | 4 | 5-02 |
| Cork | 1982-83 | Division 1A | 4 | 0-01 | 1 | 0-00 | 1 | 1-00 | 6 | 1-01 |
| Cork | 1983-84 | Division 1A | 7 | 2-06 | 2 | 2-02 | 1 | 2-01 | 10 | 6-09 |
| Total | | | 62 | 36-60 | 25 | 21-20 | 11 | 9-13 | 96 | 66-93 |

== Honours ==
=== Player ===
Youghal

- Cork Intermediate Hurling Championship (1): 1969

Cork

- All-Ireland Senior Hurling Championship (4): 1976, 1977, 1978, 1984
- Munster Senior Hurling Championship (9): 1972, 1975, 1976, 1977, 1978 (sub), 1979 (sub), 1982, 1983 (sub), 1984
- National Hurling League (4): 1971–72, 1973–74, 1979–80, 1980–81
- All-Ireland Under-21 Hurling Championship (3): 1970, 1971, 1973
- Munster Under-21 Hurling Championship (2): 1971, 1973
- All-Ireland Minor Hurling Championship (2): 1969, 1970
- Munster Minor Hurling Championship (2): 1969, 1970

=== Coach ===
Imokilly

- Cork Senior Hurling Championship (2): 1997, 1998

=== Selector ===
Cork

- All-Ireland Senior Hurling Championship (2): 1999, 2004
- Munster Senior Hurling Championship (3): 1999, 2000, 2003
- National Hurling League (1): 1998

=== Individual ===
Awards

- The 125 greatest stars of the GAA: No. 96
- All-Stars (3): 1976, 1977, 1984
