= 1926 Cork Senior Hurling Championship =

Annual hurling competition season

- Dates: 25 April 1926 – 7 November 1926
- Teams: 12
- Champions: St. Finbarr’s (8th title); Dan Coughlan (captain)
- Runners-up: Blackrock; Seán Óg Murphy (captain)

Tournament statistics
- Matches played: 11
- Goals scored: 85 (7.73 per match)
- Points scored: 68 (6.18 per match)

The 1926 Cork Senior Hurling Championship was the 38th staging of the Cork Senior Hurling Championship since its establishment by the Cork County Board in 1887. The draw for the opening round fixtures took place on 2 March 1926. The championship began on 25 April 1926 and ended on 7 November 1926.

Blackrock were the defending champions.

On 7 November 1926, St. Finbarr's won the championship following a 6–02 to 5–04 defeat of Blackrock in the final. This was their eighth championship title overall and their first title in three championship seasons.

== Team changes ==
=== To Championship ===
Promoted from the Cork Intermediate Hurling Championship

- Glen Rovers

=== From Championship ===
Regraded to the Cork Intermediate Hurling Championship

- Castletreasure

== Results ==
=== First round ===
25 April 1926 First round	Collins	4-04 - 1-01	Midleton	Riverstown Sportsfield, Sallybrook

25 April 1926 First round	Glen Rovers	1-03 - 7-08	Blackrock	The Mardyke, Cork

2 May 1926 First round	Passage	1-02 - 8-05	Redmonds	Cork Athletic Grounds, Cork

9 May 1926 First round	St. Finbarr's	5-07 - 5-02	Carrigtwohill	Riverstown Sportsfield, Sallybrook

23 May 1926 First round	Shamrocks	4-03 - 2-01	Sarsfields	Cork Athletic Grounds, Cork

20 June 1926 First round	Mallow	4-01 - 2-05	Cloughduv	Cork Athletic Grounds, Cork

=== Second round ===
1 August 1926 Second round	Mallow	3-05 - 2-01	Redmonds	Military Grounds, Fermoy

8 August 1926 Second round	Blackrock	5-03 - 0-02	Collins	The Mardyke, Cork

=== Semi-finals ===
22 August 1926 Semi-final	St. Finbarr's	5-01 - 1-01	Shamrocks	Turners Cross, Cork

29 August 1926 Semi-final	Blackrock	12-06 - 2-01	Mallow	Cork Athletic Grounds, Cork

=== Final ===
7 November 1926 Final	St. Finbarr’s	6-02 – 5-04	Blackrock	Cork Athletic Grounds, Cork

== Statistics ==
=== Miscellaneous ===
- Glen Rovers make their first appearance in the senior championship.
