= Pat Healy (hurler) =

Irish hurler

Personal information
- Native name: Pádraig Ó hÉilí (Irish)
- Born: 1938 Blackpool, Cork, Ireland
- Died: 19 July 1970 (aged 32) Mallow, County Cork, Ireland
- Height: 5 ft 5 in (165 cm)

Sport
- Sport: Hurling
- Position: Right corner-forward
Club
Years	Club	Apps (scores)
1956-1960	Glen Rovers	11 (12-10)
Club titles
- Cork titles: 2
Inter-county*
Years	County	Apps (scores)
1956-1960	Cork	4 (0-01)
Inter-county titles
- Munster titles: 1
- All-Irelands: 0
- NHL: 0
- *Inter County team apps and scores correct as of 18:21, 17 April 2015.

Patrick Healy (1938 – 19 July 1970) was an Irish sportsperson. He played hurling with his local club Glen Rovers and is an internationally acclaimed sportsman in tennis, cricket, squash, volleyball and rugby. Healy was also a member of the Cork senior inter-county team in the 1950s. Healy won an All-Ireland runners-up medal as a non playing substitute and one Munster title with Cork in 1956. He won two gold medals for Ireland; this was quite an achievement.
