= William Gleeson (hurler, fl. 1880s) =

Irish hurler

William Gleeson was an Irish sportsperson in the 1880s. Born in County Cork he played hurling with the Tower St. club that won the senior county championship in 1888. As a result of this Gleeson became the first man to captain a team representing Cork in the Munster Championship. Unfortunately, the 1888 championship was never completed owing to a Gaelic Athletic Association tour to the United States.

Preceded by N/A	Cork Senior Hurling Captain; 1888	Succeeded by Stephen Hayes
