= 1961 Cork Senior Hurling Championship =

Annual hurling competition season

- Dates: 9 April – 17 September 1961
- Teams: 16
- Champions: Blackrock (23rd title); Mick Cashman (captain)
- Runners-up: Avondhu

Tournament statistics
- Matches played: 16
- Goals scored: 120 (7.5 per match)
- Points scored: 243 (15.19 per match)
- Top scorer(s): Richie Browne (9-11)

The 1961 Cork Senior Hurling Championship was the 73rd staging of the Cork Senior Hurling Championship since its establishment by the Cork County Board in 1887. The draw for the opening round fixtures took place at the Cork Convention on 29 January 1961. The championship began ob 9 April 1961 and ended on 17 September 1961.

Glen Rovers were the defending champions, however, they were defeated by Avondhu at the semi-final stage.

On 17 September 1961, Blackrock won the championship following a 4–10 to 3–7 defeat of Avondhu in the final. This was their 23rd championship title overall and their first title in five championship seasons.

Avondhu's Richie Browne was the championship's top scorer with 9–11.

== Team changes ==
=== To Championship ===
Promoted from the Cork Intermediate Hurling Championship

- Passage
- St. Vincent's

== Results ==
First round

9 April 1961 First round	Imokilly	0-09 - 3-08	St. Vincent's	Riverstown
	J O'Gorman 0-4, S Butler 0-2, P Fitzgerald 0-1, L O'Driscoll 0-1, M O'Brien 0-1.		D O'Sullivan 1-1, D Joyce 1-1, C Cronin 1-0, B O'Shea 0-2, P O'Rourke 0-2, C O'Shea 0-2.

9 April 1961 First round	Mallow	2-04 - 6-04	Carbery	Cork Athletic Grounds, Cork
	B Nagle 1-0, M Glynn 1-0, N White 0-2, L Sheehan 0-2.		R O'Donovan 3-1, E Young 2-1, M Begley 1-1, H Haddon 0-1.	Referee: P O'Leary (Sarsfields)

16 April 1961 First round	Duhallow	3-02 - 6-09	St. Finbarr's	Macroom
	P Cotter 2-0, D Donoghue 0-2,		D Lehane 2-3, T Murphy 1-0, M McCarthy 1-0, Cronin 1-0, Doyle 0-2, Murphy 0-2, Finn 0-2.

16 April 1961 First round	Sarsfields	5-10 - 6-07	Passage	Cork Athletic Grounds, Cork
	P Barry 3-1, P O'Meara 2-0, R Lotty 0-4, P Coogan 0-3, D Hurley 0-1, T Murphy 0-1.		J Coughlan 3-1, M O'Donoghue 1-2, J Fitzgerald 1-1, J Barry 1-0, J Snow 0-2, J Reilly 0-1.

23 April 1961 First round	Carrigdhoun	1-06 - 3-12	Blackrock	Cork Athletic Grounds, Cork
	C Cooney 1-0, J Kelly 0-2, J Desmond 0-2, T Kelly 0-1, J Nyhan 0-1.		M Murphy 1-3, N O'Connell 1-1, F O'Mahony 1-0, W Galligan 0-3, R Ryan 0-3, J Bennett 0-2.	Referee: C Conway (Blarney)

23 April 1961 First round	University College Cork	6-10 - 1-04	Muskerry	Ballincollig
	J O'Driscoll 3-2, M Mortell 0-5, S Long 1-1, D Murphy 1-0, J O'Flynn 1-0, C Flynn 0-1, O Harrington 0-1.		F Sheehan 1-0, D Ford 0-1, J Barry-Murphy 0-1, M Murphy 0-1, D Riordan 0-1.

30 April 1961 First round	Glen Rovers	6-10 - 2-05	Na Piarsaigh	Cork Athletic Grounds, Cork
	C Ring 2-4, M Quane 2-1, J Clifford 2-0, P Harte 0-4, J Salmon 0-1.		P Allen 1-2, T McCarthy 1-0, D Sheehan 0-2, J O'Neill 0-1.	Referee: P Cronin (St. Finbarr's)

30 April 1961 First round	Seandún	2-08 - 8-12	Avondhu	Riverstown
	S McCarthy 1-2, P Carroll 1-0, J Curley 0-3, J Furlong 0-1, V Barrett 0-1, S Fitzpatrick 0-1.		R Browne 4-3,

21 May 1961 First round replay	Sarsfields	7-10 - 4-06	Passage	Cork Athletic Grounds, Cork
	M Barry 3-3, R Lotty 2-0, P Barry 1-1, M Kenny 1-0, D Hurley 0-2, T Murphy 0-1, P O'Meara 0-1, P Coogan 0-1, J White 0-1.		S Fitzgerald 2-1, J Reilly 1-2, J Mahony 1-0, J Barry 0-3.	Referee: P Cronin (St. Finbarr's)

Quarter-finals

20 May 1961 Quarter-final	University College Cork	4-05 - 2-09	St. Finbarr's	Cork Athletic Grounds, Cork
	D Murphy 1-1, M Mortell 1-0, S Long 1-0, J O'Driscoll 1-0, JJ Browne 0-3, J O'Byrne 0-1.		M Finn 1-6, T Cronin 1-0, W Walsh 0-1, M Leahy 0-1, P Lockheed 0-1.	Referee: P O'Leary (Sarsfields)

11 June 1961 Quarter-final	Glen Rovers	5-10 - 3-01	St. Vincent's	The Mardyke, Cork
	P Harte 3-0, C Ring 0-7, T Corbett 1-2, W Good 1-0, J Clifford 0-1.		P O'Rourke 1-1, B O'Shea 1-0, C O'Shea 1-0.	Referee: P Cronin (St. Finbarr's)

11 June 1961 Quarter-final	Avondhu	5-04 - 2-05	Carbery	Coachford
	P Behan 2-1, R Browne 2-0, R Ennis 1-1, J White 0-2.		M Begkey 1-1, B Kennedy 1-0, A Scannell 0-3, M Hussey 0-1.	Referee: P O'Leary (Matt Talbots)

2 July 1961 Quarter-final	Blackrock	3-12 - 3-05	Sarsfields	Cork Athletic Grounds, Cork
	N O'Connell 2-1, J O'Halloran 1-0, N Murphy 0-3, J Bennett 0-2, DJ Crowley 0-2, F O'Mahony 0-1, W Galligan 0-1, J O'Leary 0-1, M Cashman 0-1.		P Barry 2-3, M Barry 1-0, P O'Meara 0-1, D Hurley 0-1.	Referee: C Conway (Blarney)

Semi-finals

27 August 1961 Semi-final	Glen Rovers	4-07 - 5-11	Avondhu	Cork Athletic Grounds, Cork
	M Quane 3-0, C Ring 0-5, J Clifford 1-0, P Harte 0-1, S Kennefick 0-1.		J O'Connor 3-2, R Browne 2-5, P Behan 0-2, P Morrissey 0-1, B Hegarty 0-1.	Referee: P Cronin (St. Finbarr's)

3 September 1961 Semi-final	Blackrock	4-11 - 2-10	University College Cork	Cork Athletic Grounds, Cork
	N O'Connell 2-3, G O'Leary 1-1, M Murphy 1-1, M Cashman 0-4, W Galligan 0-1, J Bennett 0-1.		JJ Browne 2-6, S Long 0-1, J O'Flynn 0-1, R Counihan 0-1, J Blake 0-1.	Referee: C Conway (Blarney)

Final

17 September 1961 Final	Blackrock	4-10 - 3-07	Avondhu	Cork Athletic Grounds, Cork
	W Galligan 1-5, G O'Leary 1-1, J O'Halloran 1-0, M Murphy 1-0, J Bennett 0-2, M Waters 0-1, M Cashman 0-1.		R Browne 1-3, P Morrissey 1-2, R Ennis 1-0, P Behan 1-0, B Hegarty 0-1.	Referee: C Conway (Blarney)

== Championship statistics ==
=== Top scorers ===
Top scorer overall

Rank	Player	Club	Tally	Total	Matches	Average
1	Richie Browne	Avondhu	9-11	38	4	9.50
2	Paddy Barry	Sarsfields	6-05	23	3	7.66
3	Christy Ring	Glen Rovers	2-16	22	3	7.33
4	Noel O'Connell	Blackrock	5-05	20	4	5.00
5	Mick Quane	Glen Rovers	5-01	16	2	8.00
5	Michael Murphy	Glen Rovers	3-07	16	4	4.00
7	Martin Barry	Sarsfields	4-03	15	3	5.00
7	J. J. Browne	UCC	2-09	15	2	7.50
9	Jim O'Driscoll	UCC	4-02	14	3	4.66
9	Patsy Harte	Glen Rovers	3-05	14	3	4.66

Top scorers in a single game

Rank	Player	Club	Tally	Total	Opposition
1	Richie Browne	Avondhu	4-03	15	Seandún
2	Martin Barry	Sarsfields	3-03	12	Passage
2	J. J. Browne	UCC	2-06	12	Blackrock
4	Jim O'Driscoll	UCC	3-02	11	Muskerry
4	Johnny O'Connor	Avondhu	3-02	11	Glen Rovers
4	Richie Browne	Avondhu	2-05	11	Glen Rovers
7	Raymond O'Donovan	Carbery	3-01	10	Mallow
7	Paddy Barry	Sarsfields	3-01	10	Passage
7	John Coughlan	Passage	3-01	10	Sarsfields
7	Christy Ring	Glen Rovers	2-04	10	Na Piarsaigh

=== Miscellaneous ===
- Avondhu miss out on the double after they won the 1961 Cork Senior Football Championship
