= 1978 Cork Senior Hurling Championship =

Annual hurling competition season

- Dates: 6 April – 22 October 1978
- Teams: 14
- Champions: Blackrock (27th title); John Horgan (captain); Joe McGrath (manager)
- Runners-up: Glen Rovers; Martin O'Doherty (captain); Christy Ring (manager)

Tournament statistics
- Matches played: 24
- Goals scored: 89 (3.71 per match)
- Points scored: 528 (22 per match)
- Top scorer(s): Pádraig Crowley (1-25)

The 1978 Cork Senior Hurling Championship was the 90th staging of the Cork Senior Hurling Championship since its establishment by the Cork County Board in 1887. The championship began on 6 April 1978 and ended on 22 October 1978.

St. Finbarr's entered the championship as the defending champions, however, they were beaten by Glen Rovers in the semi-finals.

The final was played on 22 October 1978 at Páirc Uí Chaoimh in Cork, between Blackrock and Glen Rovers, in what was their first meeting in the final in two years. Blackrock won the match by 4–12 to 1–07 to claim their 27th championship title overall and a first title in three years.

Bandon's Pádraig Crowley was the championship's top scorer with 1-25.

== Format change ==
=== Overview ===
Since its inception in 1887 the championship had been played on a straight knock-out basis. If any team was defeated at any stage it meant automatic elimination. This system was deemed the fairest as the county champions would always be the team who won all of their games. There were some problems with this system and a special committee was established to examine the standard of competing teams. At the County Convention on 5 February 1978, delegates voted by 143 to 93 in favour of changing the format of the championship.

=== New format ===
Section one

Section one comprised the five top-graded club teams. They met each other on a league basis. The two teams to top the league table qualified for the championship semi-finals and each were included on a separate side of the draw. The third team in the section qualified for the championship quarter-final.

Section two

Section two comprised the five remaining club teams. They also met each other on a league basis. The two teams to top the league table qualified for the championship quarter-finals.

Section three

Section three comprised all the divisional and college teams. They played off on a knock-out basis with the winners of the section qualifying for the championship quarter-finals.

== Team changes ==
=== From Championship ===
Regraded to the Cork Intermediate Hurling Championship

- Mallow

Declined to field a team.

- Imokilly

== Results ==
=== Section one ===
==== Table ====
Pos	Team	Pld	W	D	L	SF	SA	Diff	Pts
1	Blackrock	4	4	0	0	4-66	8-30	+24	8
2	Glen Rovers	4	3	0	1	7-51	4-40	+20	6
3	St. Finbarr's	3	1	0	0	6-36	4-41	+1	2
4	Youghal	3	0	0	3	6-25	6-45	-20	0
5	University College Cork	2	0	0	2	3-10	4-32	-25	0
Green background The two top-placed teams qualified for the semi-final stage of the championship proper. Yellow background The third-placed team qualified for the quarter-final stage of the championship proper.

==== Results ====
6 April 1978	Blackrock	1-15 - 2-04	University College Cork	Páirc Uí Chaoimh
	B Cummins 1-1, D Collins 0-3, T Lyons 0-3, T Cashman 0-2, E O'Donoghue 0-2, F Cummins 0-1, E O'Sullivan 0-1, P Crowley 0-1, F Norberg 0-1.		T Brennan 1-0, T Cullinane 1-0, B Waldron 0-2, M McDonnell 0-2.	Referee: P Cronin (St. Finbarr's)

7 April 1978	Glen Rovers	1-14 - 1-12	St. Finbarr's	Páirc Uí Chaoimh
	K O'Keeffe 1-3, JJ O'Neill 0-2, D Coughlan 0-2, M Ryan 0-2, P Horgan 0-2, R Crowley 0-1, T Collins 0-1, N Corcoran 0-1.		J Barry-Murphy 1-1, C McCarthy 0-4, B Meade 0-2, B Wiley 0-1, E Fitzpatrick 0-1, G McCarthy 0-1, J Allen 0-1, B O'Brien 0-1.	Referee: F Murphy (Blackrock)

15 April 1978	Glen Rovers	2-11 - 2-05	Youghal	Clonmult Memorial Park
	P Horgan 0-7, T Collins 1-1, M Ryan 1-0, R Crowley 0-2, D Coughlan 0-1.		S Fitzgerald 1-0, R O'Sullivan 0-2, M Walsh 0-1, S O'Leary 0-1, M Butler 0-1.	Referee: W Horgan (Brian Dillons)

22 April 1978	Glen Rovers	3-17 - 1-06	University College Cork	Páirc Uí Chaoimh
	T O'Neill 1-5, K O'Keeffe 0-8, R Whitley 1-1, R Crowley 1-0, P Horgan 0-2, JJ O'Neill0-1.		B Waldron 0-5, T Cullinane 1-0, B Dineen 0-1.	Referee: P Cronin

23 April 1978	Blackrock	1-17 - 3-07	St. Finbarr's	Páirc Uí Chaoimh
	D Collins 0-8, E O'Sullivan 0-4, B Cummins 1-0, E O'Donoghue 0-3, F Cummins 0-1, T Lyons 0-1.		J Barry-Murphy 2-2, J Allen 1-1, G McCarthy 0-3, T Butler 0-1.	Referee: W Horgan (Brian Dillons)

6 May 1978	Blackrock	2-17 - 2-10	Youghal	Páirc Uí Chaoimh
	E O'Donoghue 1-6, E O'Sullivan 1-2, T Lyons 0-3, F Collins 0-2, D Collins 0-2, F Cummins 0-2.		R O'Sullivan 1-2, M Butler 1-0, S O'Leary 0-3, S Fitzgerald 0-2, S Ring 0-2, A O'Regan 0-1.	Referee: M English (Bishopstown)

9 June 1978	Blackrock	0-17 - 1-09	Glen Rovers	Páirc Uí Chaoimh
	D Collins 0-7, E O'Sullivan 0-3, E O'Donoghue 0-2, J Horgan 0-2, R Cummins 0-2, T Lyons 0-1.		L McAuliffe 1-1, K O'Keeffe 0-3, JJ O'Neill 0-2, P Horgan 0-2, D Clifford 0-1.	Referee: P Cronin (St. Finbarr's)

18 June 1978	St. Finbarr's	2-17 - 2-10	Youghal	Páirc Uí Chaoimh
	J Cremin 0-7, J Barry-Murphy 2-0, J O'Shea 1-2, C McCarthy 0-3, J Allen 0-3, B Wiley 0-2.		S O'Leary 2-3, M Coyne 0-1, M Walsh 0-1, M Butler 0-1.	Referee: M O'Flaherty (Blackrock)

=== Section two ===
==== Table ====
Pos	Team	Pld	W	D	L	SF	SA	Diff	Pts
1	Sarsfields	3	2	0	1	9-33	5-30	+15	4
2	Nemo Rangers	3	2	0	1	9-40	9-30	+10	4
3	Bandon	3	2	0	1	3-33	5-34	-8	4
4	Na Piarsaigh	3	0	0	3	2-32	4-44	-18	0
Green background The top-placed team qualified for the quarter-final stage of the championship proper. Yellow background These teams contested a play-of to determine which of them would enter the championship proper, however, they were later thrown out of the championship.

==== Results ====
8 April 1978	Nemo Rangers	2-16 - 1-10	Na Piarsaigh	Ballinlough
	D Allen 2-5, B Morgan 0-4, N Morgan 0-4, S Coughlan 0-1, D O'Driscoll 0-1, J Barrett 0-1.		John O'Sullivan 0-4, P Buckley 1-0, R McDonnell 0-3, D Murphy 0-1, P Barry 0-1, Jim O'Sullivan 0-1.	Referee: W Horgan (Brian Dillons)

16 April 1978	Bandon	1-11 - 1-07	Sarsfields	Páirc Uí Chaoimh
	F Crowley 1-1, N Crowley 0-3, P Crowley 0-3, J Fitzgerald 0-2, K O'Driscoll 0-1, A Duggan 0-1.		T Murphy 1-0, E Kelleher 0-3, B Óg Murphy 0-1, B Cotter 0-1, S Farrell 0-1, J Darcy 0-1.	Referee: D O'Connor

23 April 1978	Bandon	0-12 - 0-10	Na Piarsaigh	Ballinhassig
	N Crowley 0-6, J Fitzgerald 0-2, D Desmond 0-1, R Wilmot 0-1, P O'Donovan 0-1, L Ryan 0-1.		Jim O'Sullivan 0-3, John O'Sullivan 0-2, D Murphy 0-2, B Kelleher 0-1, J Whooley 0-1, J Gardiner 0-1.	Referee: D Collins (Kinsale)

23 April 1978	Sarsfields	6-10 - 3-07	Nemo Rangers	Páirc Uí Chaoimh
	B Cotter 3-1, T Murphy 1-2, E Kelleher 1-0, P O'Riordan 1-0, B Óg Murphy 0-2, J Darcy 0-2, S O'Farrell 0-2, G McEvoy 0-1.		N Morgan 2-0, B Morgan 1-3, S Coughlan 0-3, C Murphy 0-1.

10 June 1978	Sarsfields	2-16 - 1-12	Na Piarsaigh	Church Road

1 July 1978	Nemo Rangers	4-17 - 2-10	Bandon	Páirc Uí Ríogin
	J O'Neill 2-3, B Morgan 0-6, D Allen 1-1, D Calnan 1-1, N Morgan 0-3, W Barry 0-2, J Barrett 0-1.		P Crowley 1-7, F Crowley 1-2, N Crowley 0-1.	Referee: D Collins (Kinsale)

Play-off

8 July 1978 Play-off	Nemo Rangers	1-11 - 1-11	Bandon	Páirc Uí Ríogáin
	B Morgan 0-5, D Barry 1-0, D Allen 0-3, S Coughlan 0-1, N Morgan 0-1, J O'Neill 0-1.		P Crowley 0-8, N Gallagher 1-1, J Fitzgerald 0-1, K O'Driscoll 0-1.	Referee: D Collins (Kinsale)

6 August 1978 Play-off replay	Nemo Rangers	2-08 - 0-08 (abandoned)	Bandon	Páirc Uí Ríogáin
	B Morgan 1-3, W Barry 1-0, S Coughlan 0-2, D Calnan 0-1, K Murphy 0-1, J Barrett 0-1.		P Crowley 0-7, K O'Driscoll 0-1.	Referee: D Collins (Kinsale)

=== Section three ===
First round

23 April 1978 First round	Avondhu	4-16 - 2-12	Carrigdhoun	Páirc Uí Chaoimh
	D Ryan 2-4, P Buckley 1-4, D Coughlan 1-0, J Buckley 0-3, C Brassil 0-2, D O'Herlihy 0-1, P O'Herlihy 0-1, G Madigan 0-1.		G Hanley 1-6, JL O'Sullivan 1-1, K O'Donovan 0-1, G O'Sullivan 0-1, D Coleman 0-1, J Reynolds 0-1, G Webb 0-1.	Referee: M O'Flaherty (Blackrock)

Semi-finals

23 April 1978 Semi-final	Muskerry	1-15 - 2-10	Carbery	Ballinhassig
	J Finn 1-2, M Malone 0-4, D Desmond 0-4, L Lynch 0-2, MP Buckley 0-1, J O'Leary 0-1, T Hourighane 0-1.		F O'Leary 1-1, D Noonan 0-4, T Crowley 1-0, D Healy 0-3, F O'Regan 0-1, N Collins 0-1.	Referee: M English (Bishopstown)

4 June 1978 Semi-final	Seandún	4-10 - 4-08	Avondhu	Riverstown
	K Keane 1-2, P O'Sullivan 1-2, M Murphy 1-1, J McCarthy 1-1, J Nodwell 0-2, E Murphy 0-1, T O'Neill 0-1.		P Buckley 2-3, D Ryan 1-2, D Herlihy 1-1, PJ Greensmith 0-1, P Ryan 0-1.

Final

4 July 1978 Final	Muskerry	0-15 - 2-08	Seandún	Charlie Hurley Park
	D Desmond 0-12, J O'Leary 0-1, D O'Flynn 0-1, S Noonan 0-1.		P O'Sullivan 1-0, P Doyle 1-0, J McCarthy 0-3, K Keane 0-3, G O'Sullivan 0-1, M Murphy 0-1.

=== Knock-out section ===
Quarter-finals

8 July 1978 Quarter-final	St. Finbarr's	4-14 - 2-08	Sarsfields	Ballinlough
	C McCarthy 1-4, J Barry-Murphy 1-2, C Ryan 0-2, J Allen 0-2, B Wiley 1-0, E Fitzpatrick 1-0, G McCarthy 0-2, E Fitzpatrick 0-1.		B Óg Murphy 2-4, T Murphy 0-2, P Ryan 0-1, E Kelleher 0-1.	Referee: F Murphy (Blackrock)

Semi-finals

13 August 1978 Semi-final	Glen Rovers	2-11 - 2-10	St. Finbarr's	Páirc Uí Chaoimh
	P Horgan 0-5, T Collins 1-0, P Barry 1-0, J Buckley 0-2, K O'Keeffe 0-2, JJ O'Neill 0-1, R Crowley 0-1.		J Barry-Murphy 1-1, J Allen 1-1, C McCarthy 0-3, C Ryan 0-2, J Cremin 0-2, G McCarthy 0-1.	Referee: S O'Grady (Limerick)

15 October 1978 Semi-final	Blackrock	3-17 - 1-07	Muskerry	Páirc Uí Chaoimh
	R Cummins 2-3, D Buckley 1-2, D Collins 0-4, T Lyons 0-3, E O'Sullivan 0-3, P Kavanagh 0-1, E O'Donoghue 0-1.		MP Buckley 1-1, D Desmond 0-4, S Noonan 0-1, J Lucey 0-1.	Referee: J O'Riordan (Bandon)

Final

22 October 1978 Final	Blackrock	4-12 - 1-07	Glen Rovers	Páirc Uí Chaoimh
	R Cummins 1-4, É O'Sullivan 2-0, É O'Donoghue 1-2, D Collins 0-2, P Moylan 0-1, J Horgan 0-1, D Buckley 0-1, T Cashman 0-1.		T O'Brien 1-0, P Horan 0-2, J O'Brien 0-2, M Ryan 0-2, P Doherty 0-1.	Referee: S O'Grady (Limericky)

== Championship statistics ==
=== Top scorers ===
Top scorers overall

Rank	Player	Club	Tally	Total	Matches	Average
1	Pádraig Crowley	Bandon	1-25	28	5	5.30
2	Jimmy Barry-Murphy	St. Finbarr's	7-06	27	5	5.20
2	Billy Morgan	Nemo Rangers	2-21	27	5	5.20
4	Donie Collins	Blackrock	0-26	26	6	4.33
5	Éamonn O'Sullivan	Blackrock	3-13	22	6	3.66
5	Éamonn O'Donoghue	Blackrock	2-16	22	6	3.66
7	Pat Horgan	Glen Rovers	0-20	22	6	3.66
7	Denis Desmond	Muskerry	0-20	20	3	6.66
9	Kieran O'Keeffe	Glen Rovers	1-16	19	6	3.16
10	Dinny Allen	Nemo Rangers	3-09	18	5	3.60
10	Ray Cummins	Blackrock	3-09	18	4	4.50

Top scorers in a single game

Rank	Player	Club	Tally	Total	Opposition
1	Denis Desmond	Muskerry	0-12	12	Seandún
2	Dinny Allen	Nemo Rangers	2-05	11	Na Piarsaigh
3	Brian Cotter	Sarsfields	3-01	10	Nemo Rangers
3	Dave Ryan	Avondhu	2-04	10	Carrigdhoun
3	Bertie Óg Murphy	Sarsfields	2-04	10	St. Finbarr's
3	Pádraig Crowley	Bandon	1-07	10	Nemo Rangers
7	Seánie O'Leary	Youghal	2-03	9	St. Finbarr's
7	John O'Neill	Nemo Rangers	2-03	9	Bandon
7	Pat Buckley	Avondhu	2-03	9	Seandún
7	Ray Cummins	Blackrock	2-03	9	Muskerry
7	Éamonn O'Donoghue	Blackrock	1-06	9	Youghal
7	Ger Hanley	Carrigdhoun	1-06	9	Avondhu

=== Miscellaneous ===
- Nemo Rangers and Bandon were disqualified from the championship following a fracas in their section three play-off game. Both clubs were also fined £75 each and a share of the gate receipts, while a number of players subsequently received suspensions.
