= 1931 Cork Senior Hurling Championship =

Annual hurling competition season

- Dates: 22 March 1931 – 13 December 1931
- Teams: 15
- Champions: Blackrock (21st title); Eudie Coughlan (captain)
- Runners-up: Éire Óg; Dinny Barry-Murphy (captain)

Tournament statistics
- Matches played: 14
- Goals scored: 77 (5.5 per match)
- Points scored: 91 (6.5 per match)

The 1931 Cork Senior Hurling Championship was the 43rd staging of the Cork Senior Hurling Championship since its establishment by the Cork County Board in 1887. The draw for the opening round fixtures took place at the Cork Convention on 25 January 1931. The championship began on 22 March 1931 and ended on 13 December 1931.

Blackrock were the defending champions.

On 13 December 1931, Blackrock won the championship following a 2–4 to 0–3 defeat of Éire Óg in the final. This was their 21st championship title overall and their third successive title.

== Team changes ==
=== To Championship ===
Promoted from the Cork Intermediate Hurling Championship

- Midleton
- Passage West
- St. Anne's

== Results ==
=== First round ===
22 March 1931 First round	Ballincollig	3-05 - 2-00	Passage West	Cork Athletic Grounds, Cork

12 April 1931 First round	Blackrock	8-08 - 1-00	Midleton	Riverstown Sportsfield, Glanmire

19 April 1931 First round	Redmonds	2-03 - 6-04	Éire Óg	Cork Athletic Grounds, Cork

26 April 1931 First round	Glen Rovers	9-04 - 2-00	Mallow	Blarney Sportsfield, Blarney

3 May 1931 First round	St. Anne's	3-04 - 5-01	Fr. Mathew Hall	The Mardyke, Cork

17 May 1931 First round	University College Cork	1-04 - 6-06	St. Finbarr's	Cork Athletic Grounds, Cork

21 June 1931 First round	Carrigtwohill	3-03 - 3-05	Sarsfields	Cork Athletic Grounds, Cork

=== Second round ===
17 May 1931 Second round	Nemo Rangers	4-03 - 0-04	Ballincollig	Cork Athletic Grounds, Cork

5 July 1931 Second round	St. Finbarr's	3-04 - 0-02	Fr. Mathew Hall	The Mardyke, Cork

12 July 1931 Second round	Sarsfields	1-00 - 2-06	Éire Óg	Cork Athletic Grounds, Cork

15 November 1931 Second round	Blackrock	3-04 - 1-01	Glen Rovers	The Mardyke, Cork

=== Semi-finals ===
22 November 1931 Semi-final	Éire Óg	2-07 - 2-03	Nemo Rangers	Cork Athletic Grounds, Cork
	D Murphy 1-2, D Barry-Murphy 1-0, B Flynn 0-3, M Murphy 0-1.		Aherne 1-0, O'Connor 0-1.

29 November 1931 Semi-final	Blackrock	3-02 - 0-01	St. Finbarr's	Cork Athletic Grounds, Cork
	D Coughlan 1-1, M Aherne 1-0, J Quirke 1-0, E Coughlan 0-1.		J Kenneally 0-1.

=== Final ===
13 December 1931 Final	Blackrock	2-04 - 0-03	Éire Óg	Cork Athletic Grounds, Cork
	T Delea 1-0, M Ahern 0-2, E Coughlan 0-1.		B O'Flynn 0-3.	Referee: W Gleeson (Fedamore)

== Championship statistics ==
=== Miscellaneous ===
- On the eve of their first-round game against Glen Rovers, the Honorary Secretary of the Mallow club received a telegram, allegedly from County Board Secretary Seán Óg Murphy, announcing that the game was off due to an unplayable pitch. The telegram was later revealed to be a hoax.
