= 1891 Cork Senior Hurling Championship =

Annual hurling competition season

- Teams: 22
- Champions: Blackrock (3rd title); Stephen Hayes (captain)
- Runners-up: Inniscarra; William Ryan (captain)

The 1891 Cork Senior Hurling Championship was the fifth staging of the Cork Senior Hurling Championship since its establishment by the Cork County Board in 1887.

Aghabullogue were the defending champions, however, they decided not to field a team and granted a walkover to Inniscarra. For the first time ever the championship was divided along divisional lines. The champion clubs of the four divisions contested the county championship.

On 31 May 1891, Blackrock won the championship following a 4–04 to 0–00 defeat of Inniscarra in the final. This was their third championship title overall and their first title in two years.

== Results ==
=== Semi-finals ===
| 10 May 1891 Semi-final | Inniscarra | 3-03 - 0-03 | Ballyhea | Mallow Town Park, Mallow |

| 10 May 1891 Semi-final | Blackrock | 1-07 - 1-01 | Dungourney | Midleton Sportsfield, Midleton |

=== Final ===
| 31 May 1891 Final | Blackrock | 4-04 – 0-00 | Inniscarra | Mallow Town Park, Mallow |

== Championship statistics ==
=== Miscellaneous ===
- It was reported in The Nation newspaper that the attendance of 16,000 at the Blackrock-St. Finbarr's game was a then record for a hurling game in Ireland.
- Blackrock win their first title on the field of play.
