= Donie Collins =

Irish hurler

Personal information
- Native name: Dónall Ó Coileáin (Irish)
- Born: 1 September 1950 (age 76) Castlehaven, County Cork, Ireland
- Occupation: Insurance official

Sport
- Sport: Hurling
- Position: Right wing-forward
Clubs
- Years: Club
- Blackrock; James Stephens; Castlehaven
Club titles
- Cork titles: 5
- Munster titles: 5
- All-Ireland Titles: 4
Inter-county
Years	County	Apps (scores)
1971-1972	Cork	4 (1-4)
Inter-county titles
- Munster titles: 0
- All-Irelands: 0
- NHL: 1
- All Stars: 0

Donal "Donie" Collins (born 1 September 1950) is an Irish retired hurler who played as a right wing-forward for the Cork senior team.

Collins joined the team during the 1971-72 National Hurling League and was a regular member of the starting fifteen for just one season until he left the panel after the 1972 championship. During that time he won one Munster medal and one National League medal. Collins was an All-Ireland runner-up on one occasion.

At club level Collins was a record four-time All-Ireland medalist with Blackrock and James Stephens. In addition to this he has also won five Munster medals and five county club championship medals.

== Playing career ==
=== Club ===
Collins began his club hurling career with Castlehaven, however, a move to Cork city resulted in a transfer to Blackrock.

In 1971 he lined out in his first senior decider as Blackrock faced St. Finbarr's. A 2-19 to 5-4 victory secured a Cork Senior Hurling Championship medal for Collins. Blackrock subsequently represented Cork in the provincial series of games and faced Moyne-Templetuohy in the decider. A 4-10 to 3-1 victory gave Collins a Munster Senior Club Hurling Championship medal. The subsequent All-Ireland decider pitted Blackrock against Rathnure. A high-scoring game followed, and, a narrow 5-13 to 6-9 victory gave Collins an All-Ireland Senior Club Hurling Championship medal.

Blackrock surrendered their club, provincial and All-Ireland decider the following year, however, in 1973 Collins lined out in a second county championship final. A 2-12 to 2-10 defeat of Glen Rovers gave him a second championship medal. A subsequent two-point defeat of Newmarket-on-Fergus in the provincial decider gave Collins a second Munster medal. The subsequent All-Ireland final pitted Blackrock against Rathnure. A draw was followed by a replay. Late goals by Collins and Éamonn O'Donoghue secured a 3-8 to 1-9 victory and a second All-Ireland medal for Collins.

Once again back-to-back championship titles eluded Blackrock, however, a 4-11 to 0-10 defeat of Glen Rovers in 1975 gave Collins a third championship medal. He later added a third Munster medal to his collection following a 8-12 to 3-8 defeat of Mount Sion. Kilkenny's James Stephen provided the opposition in the subsequent All-Ireland final. Five points down at half-time, the Kilkenny club came back and defeated Collins's side by 2-10 to 2-4.

It was 1978 before Collins had his next success. A 4-12 to 1-7 defeat of Glen Rovers gave him a fourth championship medal. Once again Blackrock progressed through the provincial championship and defeated Newmarket-on-Fergus by two goals, giving Collins a fourth Munster medal. The All-Ireland final saw Cork take on Kilkenny again. This time it was Blackrock versus Ballyhale Shamrocks. Ray Cummins scored two goals in succession in the opening thirty minutes to put Blackrock in front. At the full-time whistle Blackrock were the winners by 5-7 to 5-5, giving Collins a third All-Ireland medal.

A 2-14 to 2-6 defeat of St. Finbarr's in 1979 gave Collins his fifth and final championship medal. It was the first time that Blackrock had won back-to-back championships in almost fifty years. He later picked up a fifth Munster medal following a 0-13 to 1-8 defeat of Dunhill.

A move to Kilkenny saw Collins join the James Stephens club. In 1982 he came on as a substitute in the All-Ireland final as the village club faced Mount Sion. A 3-13 to 3-8 victory gave Collins a record fourth All-Ireland medal.

=== Inter-county ===
Collins first came to prominence on the inter-county scene as a member of the Cork under-21 hurling team in 1970. He made his debut in the provincial semi-final that year, however, he was an unused substitute as Cork later claimed the Munster and All-Ireland crowns.

The following year Collins was still eligible for the under-21 grade. He played in the early stages of the provincial championship but was later dropped from the starting fifteen. He was introduced as a substitute in the subsequent All-Ireland decider against Wexford. A 7-8 to 1-11 victory gave Collins his first All-Ireland medal on the field of play.

Collins made his senior debut in the National Hurling League in 1971. It was a successful campaign for Cork and Collins collected a National Hurling League medal following a narrow 3-14 to 2-14 defeat of Limerick. He later made his championship debut for Cork and made a number of cameo appearances during that year's campaign. A 6-18 to 2-8 win over Clare gave Collins a Munster medal, albeit as an unused sub. The subsequent All-Ireland decider saw Cork face Kilkenny. The Rebels dominated the early exchanges and went eight points clear after a long-range score from wing-back Con Roche in the 17th minute of the second half. They didn't score again. Kilkenny took control and were level after a Frank Cummins goal, after which they went on to win by eight points.

== Honours ==
=== Team ===
Blackrock

- All-Ireland Senior Club Hurling Championship (4): 1972, 1974, 1979
- Munster Senior Club Hurling Championship (5): 1971, 1973, 1975, 1978, 1979
- Cork Senior Club Hurling Championship (5): 1971, 1973, 1975, 1978, 1979

James Stephens

- All-Ireland Senior Club Hurling Championship (1): 1982
- Leinster Senior Club Hurling Championship (1): 1981 (sub)
- Kilkenny Senior Club Hurling Championship (1): 1981 (sub)

Cork

- Munster Senior Hurling Championship (1): 1972 (sub)
- National Hurling League (1): 1971-72
- All-Ireland Under-21 Hurling Championship (2): 1970 (sub), 1971
- Munster Under-21 Hurling Championship (2): 1970 (sub), 1971 (sub)
