= 1930 Cork Senior Hurling Championship =

Annual hurling competition season

- Dates: 13 April 1930 – 14 September 1930
- Teams: 12
- Champions: Blackrock (20th title); Eudie Coughlan (captain)
- Runners-up: Glen Rovers; Paddy Collins (captain)

Tournament statistics
- Matches played: 10
- Goals scored: 62 (6.2 per match)
- Points scored: 71 (7.1 per match)

The 1930 Cork Senior Hurling Championship was the 42nd staging of the Cork Senior Hurling Championship since its establishment by the Cork County Board in 1887. The draw for the opening round fixtures took place at the Cork Convention on 26 January 1930. The championship began on 13 April 1930 and ended on 14 September 1930.

Blackrock were the defending champions.

On 14 September 1930, Blackrock won the championship following a 3–8 to 1–3 defeat of Glen Rovers in the final. This was their 20th championship title overall and their second successive title.

== Team changes ==
=== To Championship ===
Promoted from the Cork Intermediate Hurling Championship

- Ballincollig

=== From Championship ===
Regraded to the Cork Intermediate Hurling Championship

- Collins

== Results ==
=== First round ===
13 April 1930 First round	Ballincollig	3-01 - 6-06	Nemo Rangers	Cork Athletic Grounds

27 April 1930 First round	Blackrock	3-04 - 1-01	Carrigtwohill	The Mardyke

18 May 1930 First round	Redmonds	0-02 - 3-06	Glen Rovers	The Mardyke

25 May 1930 First round	Éire Óg	4-06 - 3-02	Sarsfields	Cork Athletic Grounds

25 May 1930 First round	St. Finbarr's	3-00 - 5-02	Mallow	Mitchelstown Sportsfield

First round	Fr. Matthew Hall	w/o - scr.	University College Cork

=== Second round ===
15 June 1930 Second round	Blackrock	6-05 - 5-04	Nemo Rangers	The Mardyke

29 June 1930 Second round	Éire Óg	7-03 - 2-04	Fr. Matthew Hall	Ballincollig Sportsfield

=== Semi-finals ===
13 July 1930 Semi-final	Glen Rovers	3-03 - 1-03	Mallow	Cork Athletic Grounds

17 August 1930 Semi-final	Blackrock	2-07 - 1-01	Éire Óg	Cork Athletic Grounds

=== Final ===
14 September 1930 Final	Blackrock	3-08 - 1-03	Glen Rovers	Cork Athletic Grounds
	P Ahern 2-2, Leahy 1-1, M Ahern 0-2, O'Grady 0-1, J Hurley 0-1, M Murphy 0-1.		Deasy 1-0, P Connell 0-1, C Sheehan 0-1, J Lee 0-1.	Referee: D Lanigan (Limerick)

== Championship statistics ==
=== Miscellaneous ===
- Glen Rovers qualified for the final for the first time in their history.
