= 1887 Cork Senior Hurling Championship =

Annual hurling competition season

- Dates: 6 March 1887 – 24 July 1887
- Teams: 22
- Champions: Cork Nationals (1st title)
- Runners-up: Passage

The 1887 Cork Senior Hurling Championship was the inaugural staging of the Cork Senior Hurling Championship since its establishment by the Cork County Board. The draw for the opening round fixtures took place on 30 January 1887.

The championship began on 6 March 1887, however the latter stages ended in disarray and were unfinished, however, Cork Nationals were subsequently declared the champions without having to play Passage in the final.

== Participation ==
All clubs in County Cork were invited to participate in the inaugural championship. The closing date for entries was 29 January 1887. The cost of entering a team was 2s 6d.

== Results ==
=== First round ===
6 March 1887 First round	Glasheen	1-02 - 0-00	Cork Nationals 2nd 21	Cork Park

13 March 1887 First round	Ballinhassig	1-02 - 0-01	Douglas	Cork Park

20 March 1887 First round	Tower Street	0-04 - 0-02	Evergreen Road	Cork Park

27 March 1887 First round	Blarney	1-01 - 1-00 (declared void)	Little Island	Cork Park

27 March 1887 First round	St. Finbarr's	0-05 - 0-00	Quarry Road	Cork Park

17 April 1887 First round	Aghada 2nd 21	1-00 - 3-07	St Mary's	Cork Park

17 April 1887 First round	Mogeely	0-01 - 2-03	Aghada	Cork Park

24 April 1887 First round	Inniscarra	0-00 - 1-06	Ballygarvan	Cork Park

24 April 1887 First round	Passage	w/o - scr. (declared void)	Charleville	Cork Park

1 May 1887 First round	Carrignavar	0-02 - 0-01	Monkstown	Cork Park

1 May 1887 First round	Cork Nationals	0-03 - 0-00	Aghabullogue	Cork Park

8 May 1887 First round refixture	Little Island	2-01 - 0-01	Blarney	Cork Park

15 May 1887 First round refixture	Passage	1-00 - 0-00	Charleville	Cork Park

=== Second round ===
15 May 1887 Second round	Little Island	0-07 - 0-00	Aghada	Cork Park

15 May 1887 Second round	Glasheen	0-02 - 0-02	Ballygarvan	Cork Park

22 May 1887 Second round	Tower St.	4-04 - 0-00	St Mary's	Cork Park

22 May 1887 Second round	St. Finbarr's	3-08 - 0-00	Carrignavar	Cork Park

22 May 1887 Second round	Cork Nationals	w/o - scr.	Ballinhassig	Cork Park

26 June 1887 Second round replay	Glasheen	2-01 - 0-00	Ballygarvan	Cork Park

=== Third round ===
26 June 1887 Third round	Cork Nationals	3-06 - 1-01	Little Island	Cork Park

10 July 1887 Third round	St. Finbarr's	5-04 - 2-00	Glasheen	Cork Park

=== Semi-finals ===
12 June 1887 Semi-final	Passage	3-04 – 1-06	Tower St.	Cork Park

17 July 1887 Semi-final	Cork Nationals	0-01 - 0-00	St. Finbarr's	Cork Park

23 July 1887 Semi-final refixture	Cork Nationals	v	St. Finbarr's	Cork Park

=== Final ===
24 July 1887 Final	Cork Nationals	v	Passage	Cork Park

== Championship statistics ==
=== Miscellaneous ===
- The semi-final between Cork Nationals and St. Finbarr's ended after twenty minutes when both sides and the match officials disagreed over the awarding of a point. An emergency meeting of the Cork County Committee was held with representatives from Passage Hurling Club, St. Finbarr's and the Cork Nationals being brought before the meeting. After some discussion, the Passage Hurling Club agreed to withdraw from the championship. St. Finbarr's agreed to a proposal that lots be drawn between themselves and the Cork Nationals to decide who would represent Cork in the All-Ireland Championship. The Cork Nationals rejected the idea, however, they were later awarded the championship.
