= 1929 Cork Senior Hurling Championship =

Annual hurling competition season

- Dates: 24 March 1929 – 17 November 1929
- Teams: 13
- Champions: Blackrock (19th title)
- Runners-up: St. Finbarr's

Tournament statistics
- Matches played: 11
- Goals scored: 60 (5.45 per match)
- Points scored: 67 (6.09 per match)

The 1929 Cork Senior Hurling Championship was the 41st staging of the Cork Senior Hurling Championship since its establishment by the Cork County Board in 1887. The draw for the opening round fixtures took place at the Cork Convention on 27 January 1929. The championship began on 24 March 1929 and ended on 17 November 1929.

Éire Óg were the defending champions, however, they were defeated by Blackrock at the semi-final stage.

On 17 November 1929, Blackrock won the championship after a 5–06 to 2–02 defeat of St. Finbarr's in the final. This was their 19th championship title overall and their first in two championship seasons.

== Team changes ==
=== From Championship ===
Regraded to the Cork Intermediate Hurling Championship

- Cobh
- Midleton

=== To Championship ===
Promoted from the Cork Intermediate Hurling Championship

- Nemo Rangers

=== Amalgamation ===
Kinsale and Shamrocks amalgamated to form Owenabue.

== Results ==
=== First round ===
24 March 1929 First round	University College Cork	1-02 - 1-01	Fr. Matthew Hall	Turners Cross, Cork

7 April 1929 First round	Sarsfields	1-02 - 3-03	Blackrock	Riverstown Sportsfield, Riverstown

5 May 1929 First round	Mallow	2-02 - 5-02	Carrigtwohill	The Mardyke, Cork

12 May 1929 First round	St. Finbarr's	3-08 - 0-04	Redmonds	Cork Athletic Grounds, Cork

12 May 1929 First round	Glen Rovers	2-01 - 4-02	Owenabue	Cork Athletic Grounds, Cork

3 June 1929 First round	Collins	0-03 - 7-05	Éire Óg	The Mardyke, Cork

=== Second round ===
19 May 1929 Second round	University College Cork	3-05 - 3-02	Nemo Rangers	Cork Athletic Grounds, Cork

6 October 1929 Second round	Blackrock	9-03 - 0-04	Carrigtwohill	Riverstown Sportsfield, Riverstown

20 October 1929 Second round	Éire Óg	5-03 - 0-02	Owenabue	Cork Athletic Grounds, Cork

=== Semi-finals ===
Semi-final	St. Finbarr's	w/o - scr.	University College Cork

3 November 1929 Semi-final	Blackrock	2-04 - 2-01	Éire Óg	Coachford Sportsfield, Coachford

=== Final ===
17 November 1929 Final	Blackrock	5-06 - 2-02	St. Finbarr's	Cork Athletic Grounds, Cork
