= Passage West GAA =

Gaelic Athletic Association club based in Passage West, Republic of Ireland

Passage West
- An Pasáiste
- Founded: 1885
- County: Cork
- Colours: Green and White

Playing kits
Standard colours

Senior Club Championships
| | All Ireland | Munster champions | Cork champions |
|---|---|---|---|
| Football: | 0 | 0 | 0 |
| Hurling: | 0 | 0 | 0 |

Passage West GAA is a Gaelic Athletic Association club based in the town of Passage West, in County Cork, Ireland. The club fields teams in both Gaelic football and hurling. It is a member of the Seandún division of Cork GAA. The club is geographically located in the Carrigdhoun GAA division and was originally a member of it prior to transferring to Seandún following a dispute. As of 2024, the club was playing Junior Football and Junior Hurling. The club's ground is located in the Maulbaun area of the town. It also has Ladies Football teams at underage, Minor, under 21, and Junior levels. It has won Cork County Ladies Football titles in under 12, under 16, as well as the Mid Cork Junior League.

== History ==
Passage West GAA Club was founded in 1885. Three men decided to approach a local farmer known to have interest in hurling, and asked him for the use of land as a playing pitch for hurling. The following week, the three men met again with other people and set about setting up a committee with responsibility for affiliating the new club to the Cork County Board of the GAA and, subsequently, for the running the affairs of the club.

The first decision made was that the club colours would be green and white. The first set of jerseys worn by the club was a white jersey with a large green star on the front. The first pitch used was on the land of the chairman, adjoining Rathanker, near Monkstown. The pitch was the home to the club for the next thirty years.

This pitch was also the venue for a "historic" match in 1896. A game between Redmonds and Blackrock that attracted up to 15 thousand people, the largest crowd ever known to assemble for any event in Passage. People came from Cloyne, Midleton and other parts of the county to witness the contest. Such were the crowd in Passage that the local constabulary authorities in apprehension of a breach of the peace, made an order that all pubs and hotels in the town could not open for liquor between 10 am and 10 pm. Over 100 R.I.C. men were drafted into the town to keep the peace. Redmonds won the contest by 1-3 to 4 points for Blackrock.

In 1887, the committee felt that the team was adequately prepared to enter the first ever Cork Senior Hurling Championship, playing Charleville in the first round. Passage beat Charleville by 1-0 to 0-0 but Charlville filed a protest to Cork County Board on the following grounds: (1) that Passage had men playing who were not residing in the parish, and (2) dubious decisions of the referee during the match, but both objections were rejected.

Passage played Cloyne in round 2, winning 3-7 to 0-0. In the next two rounds Passage defeated Inniscarra and Little Island, thus qualifying to meet Tower Street in the semi-final. Passage played and beat Tower Street 3-4 to 1-6, thus qualifying for the final. Meanwhile, on the other side of the draw, Cork Nationals of Blackrock and St. Finbarr's GAA (the Barr's) reached the semi-final; during their game many disputes arose, one been that Cork Nationals claimed a point given to the Barr's was not a point and therefore would not puck out the ball to restart the game. After an investigation into the matter, the County Committee decided that the remaining time would be played by both teams with the winners due to play Passage in the final. The Barr's would not accept the decision and a long protracted series of meetings took place to try to solve the matter. The end result was that the final was never played due to various reasons.

The following year, both Passage and Cork Nationals applied to the County Committee for the medals. However, the trophies were granted to the Blackrock-based club and so, today, the Cork County Board records show that Cork Nationals were the first winners of the Cork Senior Hurling Championship. The County committee denied Passage the opportunity of being the first Senior Hurling Champions of Cork.

== Achievements ==
- Cork Senior Hurling Championship Runners-Up 1887
- Cork Intermediate Hurling Championship Winners (4) 1924, 1925, 1930, 1960 Runner-Up 1975, 1976
- Cork Intermediate Football Championship Winner (1) 1983
- Cork Junior Hurling Championship Winners (2) 1905, 1906 Runner-Up 1945
- Cork Junior Football Championship Winner (1) 1982
- Cork Junior B Football Championship: Runner-Up 2007
- Cork Under-21 B Football Championship Runner-Up 2010

=== South East Division Title Winners ===
- Minor Hurling Championship Winners (7) 1931, 1932, 1933, 1934, 1946, 1949, 1950
- Minor Football Championship Winners (3) 1933, 1934, 1945.
- Carrigdhoun Junior Hurling Championship Winner (2) 1931, 1945
- Carrigdhoun Junior Football Championship Winner (1) 1944 Runner-Up 1934, 1951

=== City Titles ===
- Cork City Junior Hurling Championship Winners (1) 2021; Runner-Up 1990, 1995, 2000, 2002, 2003, 2020
- Cork City Junior Football Championship Winner (6) 1969, 1980, 1982, 1989, 1993, 1994, 2020 Runner-Up 1966, 1967, 1970, 1981, 1992, 2014
- City Junior B Football Championship Winners (3) 1982, 2007, 2012 Runners-up 2014
- City Junior C Football Championship Winners (1) 2007
- City U-21 Football Championship Winners (3) 2003, 2010, 2015 Runners-up 2013, 2014
- City U-21 B Hurling Championship Winners (2) 1982, 1990 2018 runners up 2016
- City Minor Hurling B Championship Winners (4) 1971, 1981, 1999, 2005
- City Minor Hurling B League Winners (4) 1959, 1963, 1972, 1998
- City McSwiney Cup Football Winners (6) 1966, 1967, 1970, 1980, 1981, 1982, 2017
- City McCurtain Cup Hurling Winners (3) 2002, 2018, 2023
- City Seandun Cup Football Winners (2) 2015, 2017
- City Seandun Junior Hurling A League (2) 2001, 2018, 2022
- City Seandun Junior Football A League (1) 2021

== Notable players ==
- John Horgan, 1978 Texaco Hurler of the Year
- Justin McCarthy, 1966 Hurler of the Year
- Joe Murphy
- Eddie O'Brien
- Cian McCarthy
