= Brian Corcoran =

Cork hurler and Gaelic footballer

Personal information
- Nickname: BC
- Born: 23 March 1973 (age 53) Glounthaune, County Cork, Ireland
- Occupations: Global Manufacturing Systems; Strategy Senior Manager
- Height: 6 ft 1 in (185 cm)

Sport
- Football Position: Half-back
- Hurling Position: Centre-back, Full-forward
Club
- Years: Club
- Erin's Own
Club titles
- Cork titles: 3
Inter-county*
Years	County	Apps (scores)
1993–1998 1991–2001 2004–2006	Cork (F); Cork (H); Cork (H)	17 (0–00); 22 (0–7); 17 (6–19)
Inter-county titles
	Football	Hurling
Munster Titles	3	5
All-Ireland Titles	0	3
League titles	0	2
All-Stars	0	3
- *Inter County team apps and scores correct as of (18:50, 2 August 2014 (UTC)).

Brian Corcoran (born 23 March 1973) is an Irish former hurler and Gaelic footballer who played as a centre-back and as a full-forward for the Cork senior teams.

Born in Glounthaune, County Cork, Corcoran first played competitive Gaelic games whilst at school at Midleton CBS Secondary School. He arrived on the inter-county scene at the age of fifteen when he first linked up with the Cork minor teams as a dual player, before later joining the under-21 sides. He made his senior debut during the 1991-92 National Hurling League. Corcoran went on to play a key part for Cork as both a hurler and as a footballer, and won three All-Ireland medals, five Munster medals and two National Hurling League medals. He also won three Munster medals as a footballer. He was an All-Ireland runner-up on three occasions.

As a member of the Munster inter-provincial teams in both codes, Corcoran won one Railway Cup medal. At club level he is a three-time championship medallist with Erin's Own.

His grandfather, Bill Corcoran, was an All-Ireland champion runner while his brother, John, was a dual player at minor and under-21 levels with Cork.

Throughout his career Corcoran made a combined total of 56 championship appearances for the Cork hurling and football teams. Having retired for football following the conclusion of the 1998 championship, Corcoran announced his second retirement from inter-county hurling on 14 November 2006.

Corcoran is widely regarded as one of the greatest hurlers of his generation and second only to Christy Ring in terms of Cork's all-time greatest players, and second to the great Clare Hurler Seanie McMahon in terms of the country's all time outstanding centre backs. He has been repeatedly voted onto teams made up of the sport's greats, including at left corner-back on the Cork Hurling Team of the Century in 2000, while he was later chosen as one of the 125 greatest hurlers of all-time in a 2009 poll. Corcoran also won two Hurler of the Year accolades and three All-Star awards.

== Early life ==
Corcoran was born in Caherlag, Glounthaune, County Cork in March 1973. He attended the local prima, before later completing his secondary schooling at Midleton CBS Secondary School.

Corcoran graduated from Cork Regional Technical College with a BSc in computing application and currently works as a VP of IT at Regeneron Pharmaceuticals.

== Playing career ==
=== Colleges ===
Corcoran enjoyed much success during his tenure at Midleton CBS. He captained the school to the Rice Cup in 1987, before joining the senior team the following year. He won a Dr. Harty Cup medal that year following a 2-7 to 2-3 defeat of Thurles CBS. Corcoran's side later faced St. Kieran's College in the All-Ireland decider, however, victory went to the Kilkenny college by 3-10 to 2-7.

=== Club ===
In 1991 Corcoran joined the Erin's Own senior hurling team. The following year the club reached their very first championship decider. Na Piarsaigh provided the opposition, however, Corcoran produced a masterclass and scored ten points in Erin's Own 1-12 to 0-12 victory. It was his first championship medal.

Two years later Erin's Own qualified for the junior football championship decider, having already captured the East Cork title. Kiskeam were the opponents, however, Corcoran collected a championship medal following a narrow 0-15 to 2-7 defeat of Kiskeam.

Having lost the hurling decider in 2000, Erin's Own reached the championship final once again in 2006. Two-time defeated finalists Cloyne provided the opposition, however, two vital scores from Kieran Murphy and Corcoran secured a 2-19 to 3-14 victory.

=== Minor and under-21 ===
Corcoran was just fifteen-years-old when he was invited onto the Cork minor hurling panel. Due to his age he reluctantly declined, however, he was persuaded at the second time of asking a few weeks later. To his surprise Corcoran was included on the starting fifteen and won his first Munster medal following a 5-7 to 1-2 trouncing of Tipperary. Cork later qualified for the All-Ireland final against Kilkenny with Corcoran lining out at midfield. The Cats were too strong on that occasion as Cork were defeated by 3-13 to 0-12.

Two years later Corcoran was a regular player with both the minor hurling and football teams. He won a second Munster medal that year following a 1-9 to 0-9 defeat of Clare. Once again Cork faced Kilkenny in the All-Ireland decider, however, both sides finished level at 3-14 apiece. Corcoran broke his ankle in a club game the week before the replay, however, he was introduced as a substitute. Once again Kilkenny proved too strong as Cork faced a heavy 3-16 to 0-11 defeat.

In 1991 Corcoran won a Munster medal with the Cork minor footballers following a narrow 0-10 to 0-8 defeat of Kerry. The subsequent All-Ireland final saw Mayo providing the opposition, however, Cork put in a tremendous performance to claim a 1-9 to 1-7 victory. The victory gave Corcoran an All-Ireland Minor Football Championship medal in what was his last game in the under-18 grade.

That same year Corcoran was called up to the Cork under-21 hurling team. He won a Munster medal that year as Cork defeated Limerick by 0-17 to 1-7.

Corcoran added a second Munster under-21 medal to his collection in 1993 following another 1-18 to 3-9 defeat of Limerick. Once again All-Ireland success eluded the team.

In 1994 Corcoran won a Munster medal with the Cork under-21 footballers following a comfortable 2-11 to 0-4 defeat of a Larry Tompkins-coached Waterford. The All-Ireland decider saw Mayo provide the opposition. Cork got off to a great start after scoring a goal in the first minute and maintained their advantage throughout the first half. Mayo rallied after scoring a goal from a penalty in the second half and reduced their deficit to two points, however, Cork pulled away to win by 1-12 to 1-5. Corcoran once again collected an All-Ireland medal.

=== Senior ===
==== Beginnings ====
Corcoran was just out of the minor grade in 1991 and immediately came to the attention of the Cork senior hurling selectors who invited him to play a challenge game against Dublin. After impressing in that game Corcoran was very nearly picked for Cork's Munster final team.

On 22 May 1992 Corcoran made his senior hurling championship debut in a 0-22 to 0-8 Munster quarter-final defeat of Kerry. He later outplayed the reigning Hurler of the Year Pat Fox in the semi-final before collecting his first Munster medal following a 1-22 to 3-11 defeat of Limerick in the provincial decider. Cork later faced underdogs Kilkenny in the All-Ireland decider on 6 September 1992. The Rebels shot five points without reply before D. J. Carey rattled home a penalty before half-time to leave Kilkenny just two adrift at half time. John Power kicked a goal and Cork, despite a Ger Manley goal, were unable to get back on terms as Kilkenny ran out winners on a 3-10 to 1-12 scoreline. In spite of this defeat Corcoran later collected his first All-Star, while at nineteen he became the youngest player ever to win the Texaco Hurler of the Year award. It was only the fourth time in the history of the award that a non-All-Ireland winning player claimed the accolade.

Corcoran was appointed captain of the Cork hurling team in 1993 and collected his first National Hurling League medal following a marathon three-game saga with Wexford.

==== Dual player ====
On 18 July 1993 Corcoran made his senior football championship debut in a 1-16 to 1-8 provincial final defeat of Tipperary. It was his first Munster medal. On 19 September 1993 Cork faced Derry in the All-Ireland decider. Cork got off to a good start, however, Derry capitalised on some careless play to take the lead. Tony Davis was wrongly sent off for what was later seen as a legal challenge. Enda Gormley scored six points for Derry, however, it was Séamus Downey who scored the decisive goal as Derry secured their first All-Ireland following a 1-14 to 2-8 victory.

Corcoran won a second Munster football medal in 1994 following a 2-19 to 3-9 defeat of Tipperary. Cork retained their title for a third successive year in 1995, with Corcoran winning a third Munster medal following a 0-15 to 1-9 defeat of old rivals Kerry.

In 1998 Corcoran won his second National Hurling League medal following a 2-14 to 0-13 defeat of Waterford. Later that year he decided to retire from inter-county football in an effort to prolong his hurling career.

After a seven-year hiatus Cork's hurlers claimed the provincial title in 1999. A 1-15 to 0-14 defeat of three-in-a-row hopefuls Clare gave Corcoran his second Munster medal in that code. Cork later faced Kilkenny in the All-Ireland decider on 12 September 1999. In a dour contest played on a wet day, Cork trailed by 0-5 to 0-4 after a low-scoring first half. Kilkenny increased the pace after the interval, pulling into a four-point lead. Cork moved up a gear and through Joe Deane, Ben O'Connor and Seánie McGrath Cork scored five unanswered points. Kilkenny could only manage one more score – a point from a Henry Shefflin free – and Cork held out to win by 0-13 to 0-12. It was Corcoran's first All-Ireland medal. He later won his second All-Star before claiming two Hurler of the Year titles.

Corcoran won a third Munster medal in 2000, as Cork retained their title following a 0-23 to 3-12 defeat of Tipperary.

Following Cork's exit from the 2001 championship, Corcoran shocked the hurling world when he announced his retirement from club and inter-county hurling.

==== Comeback ====
After a 2 1/2-year absence, Corcoran returned to club hurling early in 2004. His performances at club level resulted in a recall to the Cork senior team. On 16 May 2004 Corcoran made his return to championship hurling, scoring 1-1 after coming on as a substitute in a 4-19 to 1-7 Munster quarter-final defeat of Kerry. After facing a narrow 3-16 to 1-21 defeat by Waterford in one of the greatest Munster finals of all-time in 2004, Cork worked their way through the qualifiers and lined out against Kilkenny in the All-Ireland decider on 12 September 2004. The game was expected to be a classic, however, a rain-soaked day made conditions difficult as Kilkenny aimed to secure a third successive championship. The first half was a low-scoring affair and provided little excitement for fans, however, the second half saw Cork completely take over. For the last twenty-three minutes Cork scored nine unanswered points and went on to win the game by 0-17 to 0-9. It was Corcoran's second All-Ireland medal. He finished off the year by winning a third All-Star.

Corcoran won his fourth Munster medal in 2005 following a 1-21 to 1-16 defeat of old rivals Tipperary. On 11 September 2005 Cork faced surprise semi-final winners Galway in the All-Ireland decider. A sixteenth minute Ben O'Connor goal gave Cork the platform needed to withstand a Galway fightback through a Damien Hayes goal, which brought Galway within a point with twenty-one minutes remaining. Galway failed to score for the last ten minutes as Cork claimed a 1-21 to 1-16 score line. It was Corcoran's third All-Ireland medal.

Cork retained their provincial crown in 2006. Goalkeeper Donal Óg Cusack stopped two certain goals in the first half to help Cork to a 2-14 to 1-4 victory and a fifth Munster medal for Corcoran. On 3 September 2006 Cork had the opportunity to become the first side in nearly thirty years to secure three successive All-Ireland champions as they faced Kilkenny in the decider. Like previous encounters neither side took a considerable lead, however, Kilkenny had a vital goal from Aidan Fogarty. Cork were in arrears coming into the final few minutes, however, Ben O'Connor scored a late goal for Cork. It was too little too late as the Cats denied Cork on a score line of 1-16 to 1-13.

In late 2006 Corcoran was the front-runner to be named Cork captain for the upcoming league and championship campaigns. In spite of this he announced his retirement on 14 November 2006.

=== Inter-provincial ===
In 1996 Corcoran lined out for both the Munster inter-provincial hurling and football teams. After losing 1-13 to 0-9 to Leinster in the football decider, Corcoran came on as a substitute in the hurling decider. A 2-20 to 0-10 trouncing of Leinster gave him his sole Railway Cup medal.

== Career statistics ==
=== Club ===
Team	Season	Cork		Munster		All-Ireland		Total	
Team	Season	Apps	Score	Apps	Score	Apps	Score	Apps	Score
Erin's Own	1991	1	1-05	—		—		1	1-05
Erin's Own	1992	5	0-44	1	0-05	—		6	0-49
Erin's Own	1993	3	1-17	—		—		3	1-17
Erin's Own	1994	1	0-07	—		—		1	0-07
Erin's Own	1995	2	1-10	—		—		2	1-10
Erin's Own	1996	3	0-06	—		—		3	0-06
Erin's Own	1997	2	0-04	—		—		2	0-04
Erin's Own	1998	1	0-01	—		—		1	0-01
Erin's Own	1999	2	0-00	—		—		2	0-00
Erin's Own	2000	6	0-03	—		—		6	0-03
Erin's Own	2001	2	0-00	—		—		2	0-00
Erin's Own	2002	—		—		—		—	
Erin's Own	2003	—		—		—		—	
Erin's Own	2004	2	0-07	—		—		2	0-07
Erin's Own	2005	1	0-01	—		—		1	0-01
Erin's Own	2006	5	1-05	2	0-00	—		7	1-05
Career total		36	4-110	3	0-05	—		39	4-115

== Honours ==
=== Team ===
Midleton CBS

- Dr. Harty Cup (1): 1988
- Dean Ryan Cup (1): 1989

Erin's Own

- Cork Senior Hurling Championship (2): 1992, 2006
- Cork Junior Football Championship (1): 1994

Cork

- All-Ireland Senior Hurling Championship (3): 1999, 2004, 2005
- Munster Senior Hurling Championship (5): 1992, 1999, 2000, 2005, 2006
- Munster Senior Football Championship (3): 1993, 1994, 1995
- National Hurling League (2): 1992-93 (c), 1998
- All-Ireland Under-21 Football Championship (1): 1994
- Munster Under-21 Football Championship (1): 1994
- Munster Under-21 Hurling Championship (2): 1991, 1993
- All-Ireland Minor Football Championship (1): 1991
- Munster Minor Football Championship (1): 1991
- Munster Minor Hurling Championship (2): 1988, 1990

Munster

- Railway Cup (1): 1996

=== Individual ===
Awards

- Cork Hurling Team of the Century: Left corner-back
- 125 greatest hurlers of the GAA: No. 58
- Texaco Hurler of the Year (2): 1992, 1999
- All-Stars Hurler of the Year (1): 1999
- All-Star (3): 1992, 1999, 2004
- All-Ireland Senior Hurling Championship Final Man of the Match (1): 1999
- In May 2020, a public poll conducted by RTÉ.ie named Corcoran in the full-back line alongside Brian Lohan and Diarmuid O'Sullivan in a team of hurlers who had won All Stars during the era of The Sunday Game.
- Also in May 2020, the Irish Independent named Corcoran at number six in its "Top 20 hurlers in Ireland over the past 50 years".

Sporting positions
Preceded by Ger FitzGerald	Cork Senior Hurling Captain; 1993	Succeeded by Ger Cunningham
Awards
Preceded by Pat Fox (Tipperary)	Texaco Hurler of the Year; 1992	Succeeded by D.J. Carey (Kilkenny)
Preceded by Brian Whelahan (Offaly)	Texaco Hurler of the Year; 1999	Succeeded by D.J. Carey (Kilkenny)
Preceded by Brian Whelahan (Offaly)	All-Ireland Senior Hurling Final; Man of the match 1999	Succeeded by D.J. Carey (Kilkenny)
Preceded by Tony Browne (Waterford)	Eircell Hurler of the Year; 1999	Succeeded by D.J. Carey (Kilkenny)
