= 1995 Cork Senior Hurling Championship =

Annual hurling competition season

- Dates: 14 May – 24 September 1995
- Teams: 21
- Sponsor: TSB Bank
- Champions: Na Piarsaigh (2nd title); Leonard Forde (captain); Éamonn Ryan (manager)
- Runners-up: Ballyhea; Alec Morrissey (captain); Tony Moloney (manager)

Tournament statistics
- Matches played: 20
- Goals scored: 61 (3.05 per match)
- Points scored: 448 (22.4 per match)
- Top scorer(s): Niall Ahern (4-17)

The 1995 Cork Senior Hurling Championship was the 107th staging of the Cork Senior Hurling Championship since its establishment by the Cork County Board in 1887. The draw for the opening fixtures took place on 11 December 1994. The championship began on 14 May 1995 and ended on 24 September 1995.

Carbery entered the championship as the defending champions, however, they were beaten by Erin's Own in the second round.

The final was played on 24 September 1995 at Páirc Uí Chaoimh in Cork, between Na Piarsaigh and Ballyhea, in what was their first ever meeting in the final. Na Piarsaigh won the match by 1–12 to 3–01 to claim their second championship title overall and a first title in five years.

Niall Ahern was the championship's top scorer with 4–17.

== Team changes ==
=== To Championship ===
Promoted from the Cork Intermediate Hurling Championship

- St. Catherine's

== Results ==
First round

14 May 1995 First round	Avondhu	0-10 - 3-07	Blackrock	Watergrasshill
	R O'Connell 0-5, D Moher 0-4, W Hegarty 0-1.		A Browne 1-1, D Coakley 1-0, B O'Keeffe 1-0, N O'Leary 0-3, A Ryan 0-1, F Ryan 0-1, J O'Flynn 0-1.	Referee: J Motherway (Aghada)

14 May 1995 First round	Duhallow	2-10 - 5-12	Sarsfields	Watergrasshill
	C Buckley 1-3, D Breen 1-0, T Burke 0-2, T Browne 0-1, J Sheahan 0-1, T Mahony 0-1, M Cottrell 0-1, D Twomey 0-1.		P Ahern 3-8, T McCarthy 1-1, J Barry 1-1, G Murphy 0-1, B O'Callaghan 0-1.	Referee: D Relihan

10 June 1995 First round	St. Catherine's	2-09 - 1-20	Bishopstown	Clonmult Memorial Park, Midleton
	K Morrison 2-0, C Clancy 0-5, M Hegarty 0-2, T O'Connell 0-1, J Sheehan 0-1.		D O'Mahony 0-9, A O'Sullivan 1-3, V Murray 0-3, J Ryan 0-2, M Hayes 0-1, L Meaney 0-1, T Keating 0-1.	Referee: G Harrington (Carrigaline)

10 June 1995 First round	Imokilly	1-15 - 1-13	Glen Rovers	Clonmult Memorial Park, Midleton
	R Lewis 1-6, J O'Connor 0-3, E O'Mahony 0-2, M Landers 0-2, P Cahill 0-1, J Smiddy 0-1.		C O'Riordan 0-6, G O'Riordan 0-4, R Kelleher 1-0, S McGrath 0-2, T Mulcahy 0-1.	Referee: D Relihan (Castletownroche)

11 June 1995 First round	Youghal	2-11 - 5-12	University College Cork	Fr. O'Neill's Sportsfield, Ballymacoda
	B Coleman 2-0, E Coleman 0-5, M Downey 0-2, L O'Leary 0-2, B Hogan 0-1.		O O'Neill 3-2, D Murphy 1-2, J Kiely 1-1, J Brenner 0-4, J Maguire 0-2, E Enright 0-1.	Referee: E Murphy (Douglas)

Second round

10 June 1995 Second round	Blackrock	1-06 - 1-13	Sarsfields	Páirc Uí Rinn, Cork
	N O'Leary 0-4, A Browne 1-0, D Coakley 0-1, J O'Flynn 0-1.		N Ahern 1-3, G Murphy 0-2, T McCarthy 0-2, B O'Callaghan 0-2, J Barry 0-2, T Óg Lynch 0-1, P O'Callaghan 0-1.	Referee: J O'Leary (Na Piarsaigh)

10 June 1995 Second round	Ballyhea	6-17 - 0-04	Cork Regional Technical College	Carrowkeel Sportsfield, Mallow
	M O'Callaghan 3-3, I Ronan 2-4, A Morrissey 1-1, D Ronan 0-4, P O'Connell 0-3, T O'Riordan 0-1, A O'Connor 0-1.		F O'Mahony 0-1, V Cooney 0-1, F Kelly 0-1, P Dowling 0-1.	Referee: R Murphy (Lyre)

10 June 1995 Second round	Milford	1-13 - 3-13	Muskerry	Carrowkeel Sportsfield, Mallow
	V Sheehan 0-6, N Geary 1-0, D O'Brien 0-3, P Madigan 0-2, C Collins 0-1, J Sheehan 0-1.		K Murray 1-3, M Sheehan 1-2, F O'Callaghan 1-1, J O'Callaghan 0-4, J Foley 0-1, K O'Donoghue 0-1, T Barry-Murphy 0-1.	Referee: P Spillane (Carrigtwohill)

11 June 1995 Second round	Carbery	0-14 - 1-12	Erin's Own	Páirc Uí Chaoimh, Cork
	P Crowley 0-6, B Harte 0-2, D O'Connell 0-2, D O'Donoghue 0-1, C Murphy 0-1, P Condon 0-1.		B Corcoran 0-6, T Kelleher 1-0, J Corcoran 0-2, P Geasley 0-2, F Horgan 0-1, M Wallace 0-1.	Referee: W Horgan (Brian Dillons)

11 June 1995 Second round	St. Finbarr's	2-12 - 0-12	Carrigdhoun	Páirc Uí Chaoimh, Cork
	B Cunningham 1-3, K Kelleher 1-3, M Ryan 0-2, M Barry 0-2, N Hosford 0-1, C Duffy 0-1.		K Kingston 0-2, S McCarthy 0-2, Damien McCarthy 0-2, C O'Donovan 0-2, P Deasy 0-2, J Dineen 0-1, G Cummins 0-1.	Referee: J Motherway (Aghada)

23 June 1995 Second round	Seandún	1-13 - 2-13	Imokilly	Riverstown
	B Egan 1-7, K Egan 0-3, A McCarthy 0-1, G Healy 0-1, M McElhinney 0-1.		R Lewis 0-5, J Smiddy 1-1, P Cahill 1-0, E O'Mahony 0-3, J O'Connor 0-2, M Landers 0-1, J Deane 0-1.	Referee: G Harrington (Carrigaline)

25 June 1995 Second round	Midleton	1-13 - 0-11	Bishopstown	Lisgoold
	G Manley 0-6, G Fitzgerald 1-1, C Quirke 0-2, P O'Brien 0-2, P Smith 0-1, M O'Connell 0-1.		V Murray 0-3, A Kelly 0-2, A O'Sullivan 0-2, L Meaney 0-2, D O'Sullivan 0-2.	Referee: J O'Leary (Na Piarsaigh)

25 June 1995 Second round	Na Piarsaigh	1-15 - 1-08	University College Cork	Páirc Uí Rinn, Cork
	J Moran 1-7, Mark Mullins 0-2, Mick Mullins 0-2, D Daly 0-2, J O'Connor 0-1, K Butterworth 0-1.		J Brenner 0-4, D Murphy 1-0, E Enright 0-1, P Collins 0-1, T Harrington 0-1, J Maguire 0-1.	Referee: W Horgan (Brian Dillons)

Quarter-finals

28 July 1995 Quarter-final	Na Piarsaigh	3-15 - 0-05	Muskerry	Innishannon
	J Moran 1-4, T O'Sullivan 0-6, Mark Mullins 1-1, J O'Connor 1-0, G Daly 0-1, M Sullivan 0-1, C Lynch 0-1, Mick Mullins 0-1.		J Healy 0-4, M O'Regan 0-1.	Referee: J Motherway

29 July 1995 Quarter-final	Imokilly	0-12 - 0-09	Midleton	Youghal
	J Smiddy 0-5, R Lewis 0-4, J O'Connor 0-2, R Dwane 0-1.		G Manley 0-5, C Quirke 0-1, P O'Brien 0-1, M O'Connell 0-1, W Wallace 0-1.	Referee: D O'Leary (Cloughduv)

30 July 1995 Quarter-final	St. Finbarr's	2-10 - 0-12	Sarsfields	Páirc Uí Rinn, Cork
	B Cunningham 1-4, E Griffin 1-0, C Duffy 0-2, F Ramsey 0-2, M Quaid 0-1, P Forde 0-1.		N Ahern 0-6, T McCarthy 0-3, B O'Callaghan 0-1, C O'Leary 0-1, D Kenneally 0-1.	Referee: W Horgan (Brian Dillons)

30 July 1995 Quarter-final	Ballyhea	1-14 - 2-10	Erin's Own	Páirc Mac Gearailt, Fermoy
	D Ronan 1-2, M O'Callaghan 0-4, A Morrissey 0-3, P O'Connell 0-2, I Ronan 0-2, J O'Sullivan 0-1.		J Corcoran 1-6, B Corcoran 1-4.	Referee: G Harrington (Carrigaline)

Semi-finals

26 August 1995 Semi-final	Na Piarsaigh	1-15 - 2-05	St. Finbarr's	Páirc Uí Rinn, Cork
	T O'Sullivan 0-7, J O'Connor 1-1, Mark Mullins 0-5, Mick Mullins 0-1, G Daly 0-1.		P Forde 1-1, E GRiffin 1-0, M Ryan 0-2, B Cunningham 0-2.	Referee: J Motherway

26 August 1995 Semi-final	Ballyhea	2-09 - 1-11	Imokilly	Páirc Uí Rinn, Cork
	M O'Callaghan 1-1, A Morrissey 0-4, I Ronan 1-0, J O'Sullivan 0-2, D Ronan 0-1, N Ronan 0-1.		P Cahill 1-2, J Smiddy 0-5, J O'Connor 0-2, D Motherway 0-1, J Deane 0-1.	Referee: J O'Leary (Na Piarsaigh)

Final

24 September 1995 Final	Na Piarsaigh	1-12 - 3-01	Ballyhea	Páirc Uí Chaoimh, Cork
	M O'Sullivan 1-1, JA Moran 0-4, T O'Sullivan 0-3, Mark Mullins 0-2, C Lynch 0-2.		J O'Sullivan 1-0, M O'Callaghan 1-0, D Ronan 1-0, P O'Connell 0-1.	Attendance: 12,718; Referee: J Motherway

== Championship statistics ==
=== Top scorers ===
Overall

Rank	Player	Club	Tally	Total	Matches	Average
1	Niall Ahern	Sarsfields	4-17	29	3	9.66
2	Mike O'Callaghan	Ballyhea	5-08	23	4	5.75
3	John Anthony Moran	Na Piarsaigh	2-15	21	4	5.25
4	Richie Lewis	Imokilly	1-15	18	4	4.50
5	Tony O'Sullivan	Na Piarsaigh	0-16	16	4	4.00
6	Ian Ronan	Ballyhea	3-06	15	4	3.75
6	Brian Cunningham	St. Finbarr's	2-09	15	3	5.00
6	Jimmy Smiddy	Imokilly	1-12	15	4	3.75
7	Darren Ronan	Ballyhea	2-07	13	4	3.25
7	Mark Mullins	Na Piarsaigh	1-10	13	4	3.25
7	Brian Corcoran	Erin's Own	1-10	13	2	6.50

In a single game

Rank	Player	Club	Tally	Total	Opposition
1	Niall Ahern	Sarsfields	3-08	17	Duhallow
2	Mike O'Callaghan	Ballyhea	3-03	12	Cork RTC
3	Owen O'Neill	UCC	3-02	11	Youghal
4	John Anthony Moran	Na Piarsaigh	1-07	10	UCC
4	Barry Egan	Seandún	1-07	10	Imokilly
5	John Corcoran	Erin's Own	1-06	9	Ballyhea
5	Richie Lewis	Imokilly	1-06	9	Glen Rovers
5	Donal O'Mahony	Bishopstown	0-09	9	St. Catherine's
6	John Anthony Moran	Na Piarsaigh	1-04	7	Muskerry
6	Brian Corcoran	Erin's Own	1-04	7	Ballyhea
6	Brian Cunningham	St. Finbarr's	1-04	7	Sarsfields
6	Tony O'Sullivan	Na Piarsaigh	0-07	7	St. Finbarr's

=== Miscellaneous ===
- Cork Regional Technical College play in the championship for the first time.
- Ballyhea qialify for the final for the first time since 1984.
