= 1996 Cork Senior Hurling Championship =

Annual hurling competition season

- Dates: 2 June 1996 – 6 October 1996
- Teams: 22
- Sponsor: TSB Bank
- Champions: Avondhu (3rd title); Aidan Kenny (captain); Jack Russell (manager)
- Runners-up: Imokilly; Mark Landers (captain); Seánie O'Leary (manager)

Tournament statistics
- Matches played: 28
- Goals scored: 81 (2.89 per match)
- Points scored: 661 (23.61 per match)
- Top scorer(s): Jimmy Smiddy (3-38)

The 1996 Cork Senior Hurling Championship was the 108th staging of the Cork Senior Hurling Championship since its establishment by the Cork County Board in 1887. The draw for the opening fixtures took place on 10 December 1995. The championship began on 2 June 1996 and ended on 6 October 1996.

Na Piarsaigh entered the championship as the defending champions, however, they were defeated by Imokilly at the semi-final stage.

On 6 October 1996, Avondhu won the championship following a 0–13 to 1–08 defeat of Imokilly in a replay of the final. This was their third championship title overall and their first in 30 championship seasons.

Imokilly's Jimmy Smiddy was the championship's top scorer with 3-38.

== Team changes ==
=== To Championship ===
Promoted from the Cork Intermediate Hurling Championship

- Kilbrittain

== Results ==
First round

2 June 1996 First round	Sarsfields	4-14 - 0-11	Seandún	Páirc Uí Chaoimh, Cork
	N Ahern 3-7, P O'Callaghan 1-1, P Ryan 0-3, J Murphy 0-2, C O'Leary 0-1.		B Egan 0-6, M McElhinney 0-2, K Egan 0-1, D Quinlan 0-1, D McElhinney 0-1.	Referee: J Motherway (Aghada)

2 June 1996 First round	Duhallow	0-07 - 1-16	Muskerry	Carrowkeel Sportsfield, Mallow
	C Buckley 0-3, W King 0-2, T O'Mahony 0-1, P Newman 0-1.		T Barry-Murphy 0-10, K O'Donoghue 1-1, S O'Donoghue 0-2, A Dorgan 0-2, P Maher 0-1.	Referee: W Horgan (Brian Dillons)

2 June 1996 First round	Milford	1-12 - 2-12	Glen Rovers	Carrowkeel Sportsfield, Mallow
	V Sheehan 0-5, G Sheehan 1-0, S Stritch 0-2, D O'Brien 0-2, J Fitzgibbon 0-1, R Geary 0-1, C Collins 0-1.		T Mulcahy 1-3, K O'Callaghan 1-3, C O'Riordan 0-2, L de Faoite 0-2, G O'Riordan 0-1, R Kelleher 0-1.	Referee: L O'Flynn (Éire Óg)

23 June 1996 First round	Midleton	3-12 - 2-16	University College Cork	Rathcormac
	G Manley 1-8, E Crotty 2-1, M O'Connell 0-2, G Fitzgerald 0-1.		J Enright 1-11, J Deane 1-2, P O'Dwyer 0-1, E Enright 0-1, D McGrath 0-1.	Referee: D Relihan (Castletownroche)

23 June 1996 First round	Avondhu	9-18 - 0-06	Cork Regional Technical College	Rathcormac
	R Sheehan 4-3, W O'Donoghue 2-2, D Moher 1-5, B O'Driscoll 1-3, A Walsh 0-4, S Kileen 1-0, R O'Connell 0-1.		V Cooney 0-4, JD Murphy 0-1, J O'Sullivan 0-1.	Referee: M O'Flaherty

23 June 1996 First round	Youghal	0-14 - 1-11	Bishopstown	Cobh
	E Coleman 0-6, P O'Brien 0-3, G Geary 0-2, M Downing 0-1, F O'Sullivan 0-1, B Coleman 0-1.		E O'Farrell 1-3, L Meaney 0-3, A O'Sullivan 0-2, B Cuthbert 0-1, T Keating 0-1, C Coffey 0-1.	Referee: G Harrington (Carrigaline)

30 June 1996 First round replay	Youghal	1-11 - 5-09	Bishopstown	Cobh
	E Coleman 1-7, B Coleman 0-2, B Hogan 0-1, P Cody 0-1.		A O'Sullivan 2-2, D O'Mahony 2-1, E O'Farrell 1-2, L Meaney 0-4.	Referee: G Harrington (Carrigaline)

Second round

2 June 1996 Second round	Imokilly	1-17 - 2-06	Carrigdhoun	Páirc Uí Chaoimh, Cork
	R Dwane 1-4, J Smiddy 0-6, R Lewis 0-4, M Landers 0-2, M Daly 0-1.		A O'Driscoll 1-2, K Kingston 1-0, D McCarthy 0-2, G Cummins 0-1, J Kingston 0-1.	Referee: J O'Leary (Na Piarsaigh)

22 June 1996 Second round	St. Finbarr's	4-15 - 1-09	Blackrock	Páirc Uí Chaoimh, Cork
	B CUnningham 1-5, M Barry 2-0, C Duffy 1-3, K Kelleher 0-2, B O'Shea 0-2, M Ryan 0-1, E Griffin 0-1, A O'Regan 0-1.		A Cummins 1-2, A Ryan 0-3, E Kavanagh 0-1, N O'Leary 0-1, B O'Keeffe 0-1, J Browne 0-1.	Referee: J Motherway

23 June 1996 Second round	Ballyhea	2-12 - 1-16	St. Catherine's	Páirc Mac Gearailt, Fermoy
	D Ronan 2-0, A Morrissey 0-5, I Ronan 0-4, N Ronan 0-2, M O'Callaghan 0-1.		C Clancy 0-10, B Cotter 1-0, D O'Connell 0-3, C Casey 0-2, K Morrison 0-1.	Referee: W Horgan (Brian Dillons)

29 June 1996 Second round	Kilbrittain	2-14 - 2-14	Sarsfields	Cloughduv
	T McCarthy 2-0, D O'Connell 0-6, T Brennan 0-2, E Sheehy 0-2, N Crowley 0-1, G O'Connell 0-1, C O'Donoghue 0-1, B Ahern 0-1.		N Ahern 0-9, Johnny Murphy 1-1, P O'Callaghan 1-0, P Ryan 0-2, C O'Leary 0-1, Gerry Murphy 0-1.

5 July 1996 Second round	Na Piarsaigh	1-12 - 1-05	Muskerry	Páirc Uí Chaoimh, Cork
	M Mullins 0-4, K Butterworth 1-0, T O'Sullivan 0-3, J O'Connor 0-1, C Lynch 0-1, JA Moran 0-1, P O'Flynn 0-1, G Shaw 0-1.		S Holland 1-2, S O'Donoghue 0-1, T Barry 0-1, J Foley 0-1.	Referee: W Horgan (Brian Dillons)

6 July 1996 Second round	Erin's Own	0-15 - 2-09	Bishopstown	Páirc Uí Rinn, Cork
	J Corcoran 0-7, B Corcoran 0-3, K Murphy 0-3, P Kelly 0-1, F Horgan 0-1.		A O'Sullivan 1-3, D O'Mahony 0-5, J Ryan 1-0, M Hayes 0-1.	Referee: M O'Flaherty (Blackrock)

6 July 1996 Second round	Avondhu	0-10 - 0-09	Carbery	Coachford Sportsfield, Coachford
	R O'Connell 0-5, B O'Driscoll 0-2, J Walsh 0-1, W O'Donoghue 0-1, J Hayes 0-1.		C Murphy 0-3, D O'Donoghue 0-2, J O'Sullivan 0-2, T Crowley 0-1, B Harte 0-1.

7 July 1996 Second round replay	Kilbrittain	2-08 - 1-10	Sarsfields	Cloughduv
	D O'Connell 2-3, T Brennan 0-3, E Sheehy 0-1, C O'Donoghue 0-1.		N Ahern 1-0, P Ryan 0-3, C O'Leary 0-2, P O'Callaghan 0-2, B Lotty 0-2, J Murphy 0-1.	Referee: L O'Flynn (Éire Óg)

14 July 1996 Second round	Glen Rovers	1-13 - 1-12	University College Cork	Páirc Uí Rinn, Cork
	C O'Riordan 0-6, S McGrath 0-5, R Kelleher 1-0, L White 0-1, T Mulcahy 0-1.		J Enright 0-7, E Enright 1-0, J Deane 0-2, D Bennett 0-1, P O'Dwyer 0-1, D McGrath 0-1.	Referee: G Harrington (Carrigaline)

27 July 1996 Second round replay	Erin's Own	4-12 - 0-11	Bishopstown	Páirc Uí Chaoimh, Cork
	M Wallace 2-0, J Corcoran 0-6, P Geasley 1-2, J Dillon 1-0, M Dunne 0-2, B Corcoran 0-1, F Horgan 0-1.		J Ryan 0-4, M Hayes 0-2, A O'Sullivan 0-2, C Dineen 0-1, D O'Mahony 0-1, C Doyle 0-1.	Referee: M O'Flaherty (Blackrock)

Quarter-finals

20 July 1996 Quarter-final	Imokilly	0-14 - 3-05	Kilbrittain	Páirc Uí Rinn, Cork
	J Smiddy 0-5, B Walsh 0-3, R Lewis 0-2, T McCarthy 0-1, D Barrett 0-1, R Dwane 0-1, Seán O'Farrell 0-1.		D O'Connell 3-4, P Sexton 0-1.	Referee: W Horgan (Brian Dillons)

27 July 1996 Quarter-final	Glen Rovers	0-13 - 0-13	St. Finbarr's	Páirc Uí Chaoimh, Cork
	S McGrath 0-4, C O'Riordan 0-4, G Riordan 0-2, T Murphy 0-1, T Mulcahy 0-1, K McGuckin 0-1.		B O'Shea 0-6, B Cunningham 0-4, C Duffy 0-2, M Ryan 0-1.	Referee: J O'Leary

28 July 1996 Quarter-final	Avondhu	0-20 - 0-10	St. Catherine's	Páirc Mac Gearailt, Fermoy
	R O'Connell 0-8, B O'Driscoll 0-3, D Moher 0-3, A Walsh 0-3, A Kenny 0-2, F McCormack 0-1.		C Clancy 0-4, K Morrison 0-2, D Walsh 0-1, C Casey 0-1, D O'Leary 0-1, M Hegarty 0-1.	Referee: J Motherway (Aghada)

3 August 1996 Quarter-final	Na Piarsaigh	3-11 - 0-08	Erin's Own	Páirc Uí Chaoimh, Cork
	JA Moran 2-4, Mark Mullins 0-6, G Daly 1-0, T O'Sullivan 0-1.		J Corcoran 0-3, B Corcoran 0-2, P Geasley 0-2, T O'Keeffe 0-1.	Referee: L O'Flynn

4 August 1996 Quarter-final replay	Imokilly	3-18 - 1-10	Kilbrittain	Páirc Uí Rinn, Cork
	J Smiddy 1-10, R Dwane 1-3, T McCarthy 1-0, R Lewis 0-2, B Walsh 0-2, S O'Farrell 0-1.		D O'Connell 1-5, P Sexton 0-2, T Brennan 0-1, N Crowley 0-1, J O'Connell 0-1.	Referee: W Horgan (Brian Dillons)

24 August 1996 Quarter-final replay	Glen Rovers	1-13 - 1-10	St. Finbarr's	Páirc Uí Chaoimh, Cork
	C O'Riordan 0-4, T Mulcahy 1-0, G O'Riordan 0-3, T Harte 0-3, S McGrath 0-2, T Murphy 0-1.		B Cunningham 1-3, B O'Shea 0-4, F Lehane 0-1, M Ryan 0-1, C Duffy 0-1.	Referee: J Motherway

Semi-finals

25 August 1996 Semi-final	Imokilly	1-09 - 0-10	Na Piarsaigh	Páirc Uí Chaoimh, Cork
	J Smiddy 1-5, T McCarthy 0-4.		Mark Mullins 0-4, JA Moran 0-3, T O'Sullivan 0-2, Mick Mullins 0-1.	Referee: L O'Flynn (Éire Óg)

8 September 1996 Semi-final	Avondhu	0-17 - 2-11	Glen Rovers	Páirc Uí Chaoimh, Cork
	R O'Connell 0-5, D Moher 0-5, B O'Driscoll 0-3, F McCormack 0-2, A Kenny 0-1, J Walsh 0-1.		T Mulcahy 1-2, C O'Riordan 0-4, R Kelleher 1-0, S McGrath 0-3, G O'Riordan 0-1, D Cooper 0-1.	Referee: J Motherway

14 September 1996 Semi-final replay	Avondhu	4-14 - 2-12	Glen Rovers	Páirc Uí Chaoimh, Cork
	S Killeen 2-3, B O'Driscoll 1-5, R O'Connell 1-1, F McCormack 0-3, A Kenny 0-2.		S McGrath 1-3, G O'Riordan 0-4, R Kelleher 1-0, T Murphy 0-2, C O'Riordan 0-2, T Mulcahy 0-1.	Referee: J Motherway

Final

22 September 1996 Final	Imokilly	1-12 - 1-12	Avondhu	Páirc Uí Chaoimh, Cork
	J Smiddy 1-6, P Cahill 0-2, M Landers 0-1, B Walsh 0-1, R Dwane 0-1, R Lewis 0-1.		R O'Connell 0-5, B O'Driscoll 0-4, R Sheehan 1-0, J Hayes 0-1, S Killeen 0-1, F McCormack 0-1.	Referee: J O'Leary (Na Piarsaigh)

6 October 1996 Final replay	Avondhu	0-13 - 1-08	Imokilly	Páirc Uí Chaoimh, Cork
	R O'Connell 0-5, B O'Driscoll 0-2, F McCormack 0-2, R Sheehan 0-2, A Kenny 0-1, J Hayes 0-1.		J Smiddy 0-6, B Walsh 1-0, D Barrett 0-1, P Cahill 0-1.	Referee: J O'Leary (Na Piarsaigh)

== Championship statistics ==
=== Top scorers ===
Overall

Rank	Player	Club	Tally	Total	Matches	Average
1	Jimmy Smiddy	Imokilly	3-38	47	6	7.83
2	Dan O'Connell	Kilbrittain	6-21	39	5	7.80
3	Ray O'Connell	Avondhu	1-30	33	7	4.71
4	Niall Ahern	Sarsfields	4-16	28	3	9.33
4	Brian O'Driscoll	Avondhu	2-22	28	7	4.00
6	Conor O'Riordan	Glen Rovers	0-22	22	6	3.33
7	Johnny Enright	UCC	1-18	21	2	10.50
8	Ronan Sheehan	Avondhu	5-05	20	7	2.85
8	Seánie McGrath	Glen Rovers	1-17	20	6	3.33
10	Brian Cunningham	St. Finbarr's	2-12	18	3	6.00

In a single game

Rank	Player	Club	Tally	Total	Opposition
1	Niall Ahern	Sarsfields	3-07	16	Seandún
2	Ronan Sheehan	Avondhu	4-03	15	Cork RTC
3	Johnny Enright	UCC	1-11	14	Midleton
4	Jimmy Smiddy	Imokilly	1-10	13	Kilbrittain
5	Ger Manley	Midleton	1-08	11	UCC
6	John Anthony Moran	Na Piarsaigh	2-04	10	Erin's Own
6	Eoin Coleman	Youghal	1-07	10	Bishopstown
6	Christy Clancy	St. Catherine's	0-10	10	Ballyhea
6	Tim Barry-Murphy	Muskerry	0-10	10	Duhallow
10	Shane Killeen	Avondhu	2-03	9	Glen Rovers
10	Dan O'Connell	Kilbrittain	2-03	9	Sarsfields
10	Jimmy Smiddy	Imokilly	1-06	9	Avondhu
10	Niall Ahern	Sarsfields	0-09	9	Kilbrittain

=== Miscellaneous ===
- The final was the first to feature two divisional teams.
- Avondhu win the title for the first time since 1966
- Imokilly qualify for the final for the first time since 1968
