= Seánie McGrath =

Irish hurler (born 1975)

Personal information
- Native name: Seánie Mac Craith (Irish)
- Born: 10 June 1975 (age 51) Mayfield, Cork, Ireland
- Occupation: Managing director
- Height: 5 ft 10 in (178 cm)

Sport
- Sport: Hurling
- Position: Left corner-forward
Club
Years	Club	Apps (scores)
1993-2007	Glen Rovers	41 (5-83)
Club titles
- Cork titles: 0
College
- Years: College
- 1993-1997: University College Cork
College titles
- Fitzgibbon titles: 2
Inter-county*
Years	County	Apps (scores)
1997–2003	Cork	17 (1–32)
Inter-county titles
- Munster titles: 3
- All-Irelands: 1
- NHL: 1
- All Stars: 1
- *Inter County team apps and scores correct as of 17:05, 19 July 2014.

Seánie McGrath (born 10 June 1975) is an Irish retired hurler who played as a left corner-forward for the Cork senior team.

Born in Mayfield, Cork, McGrath first played competitive hurling during his schooling at Mayfield Community School. He arrived on the inter-county scene at the age of seventeen when he first linked up with the Cork minor team, before later joining the under-21 side. He made his senior debut during the 1997 championship. McGrath went on to win one All-Ireland medal, two Munster medals and one National Hurling League medal. He was an All-Ireland runner-up on one occasion.

As a member of the Munster inter-provincial team McGrath won three Railway Cup medals. At club level he enjoyed a lengthy career with Glen Rovers.

Throughout his inter-county career McGrath made 17 championship appearances for Cork. His retirement came following the conclusion of the 2003 championship.

In retirement from playing McGrath became involved in team management and coaching. He is currently a selector with the Cork senior team, having earlier served with the Cork minor team.

== Playing career ==
=== University College Cork ===
On 2 March 1997, McGrath was at left wing-forward when University College Cork faced the Garda College in the final of the Fitzgibbon Cup. He scored three points from play and collected a winners' medal in the 0-14 to 1-08 victory.

McGrath lined out in a second Fitzgibbon Cup final on 1 March 1998. He top scored with 1-04 from left wing-forward in the 2-17 to 0-13 defeat of the Waterford Institute of Technology in the final. McGrath was also named man of the match.

=== Glen Rovers ===
McGrath began his club hurling career with Mayfield before later joining the Glen Rovers club. On 12 November 1995, McGrath was at left wing-forward when Glen Rovers faced Ballincollig in the final of the Cork Under-21 Championship. McGrath top scorer with 1-05 in the 2-14 to 1-14 victory.

By this stage McGrath had already joined the Glen Rovers senior team. He made his first appearance for the team on 11 July 1993 in a 3-09 to 2-04 defeat by Na Piarsaigh.

McGrath played his last senior championship game for the club in a 2-15 to 1-12 defeat by Newtownshandrum on 9 September 2007. He subsequently joined the Glen Rovers junior team and won a City Division Championship on 23 September 2008 after a 2-13 to 0-10 defeat of Douglas in the final. McGrath top scored with 1-05 as well as being joint captain of the team.

=== Cork ===
==== Minor and under-21 ====
McGrath first played for Cork when he was selected for the minor team during the 1992 Munster Championship. He made his first appearance on 1 May and scored two points from left corner-forward in a 1-11 to 0-11 defeat by Tipperary.

McGrath was eligible for the minor grade again in 1993. He was at right corner-forward on 4 July when Cork suffered a 1-22 to 1-09 defeat by Tipperary in the Munster final.

On 27 July 1994, McGrath made his first appearance for the Cork under-21 team in a 3-13 to 2-10 defeat by Clare in the Munster Championship.

After an unsuccessful season in 1995, McGrath was appointed captain of the team for the 1996 Munster Championship. On 24 July he captained Cork to a 3-16 to 2-07 defeat of Clare in the Munster final.

==== Senior ====
McGrath was drafted onto the Cork senior team before the 1997 National League. He made his first appearance for the team on 9 March and scored two points in a 6-21 to 2-04 defeat of Westmeath. McGrath made his championship debut on 8 June and scored five points from right corner-forward in a 1-19 to 0-18 defeat by Clare.

On 17 May 1998, McGrath won a National Hurling League medal at right wing-forward following a 2-14 to 0-13 defeat of Waterford in the final.

McGrath lined out in his first Munster final on 4 July 1999. He scored two points from right corner-forward in a 1-15 to 0-14 defeat of reigning champions Clare. On 11 September, McGrath was again at right corner-forward for the All-Ireland final against Kilkenny. He scored three points and claimed a winners' medal following the 0-13 to 0-12 victory. McGrath was later honoured with an All-Star award.

On 3 July 2000, McGrath lined out in his second Munster final. He scored three points from right corner-forward and collected a second consecutive winners' medal following a 0-23 to 3-12 defeat of Tipperary.

McGrath lined out in six of Cork's games during the 2002 National League. He was an unused substitute on 5 May when Cork suffered a 2-15 to 2-14 defeat by Kilkenny in the final. On 29 November, McGrath and all 29 of his teammates withdrew their services from the county in the hope of better treatment from the county board. He played a low-key role during the strike before a settlement was agreed with the county board on 13 December.

McGrath lined out in all seven of Cork's games during the 2003 National League but failed to secure a place on the starting fifteen for the championship. He won a third Munster Championship medal as a non-playing substitute on 29 June after a 3-16 to 3-12 defeat of Waterford in the final. On 14 September, McGrath was also named on the bench when Cork faced Kilkenny in the All-Ireland final. He was introduced as a 67th-minute substitute and scored a point in the 1-14 to 1-11 defeat. It was his last game for Cork.

=== Munster ===
McGrath was first picked for the Munster inter-provincial team in 1997. It was a successful campaign for the southern province, as a 0–14 to 0–10 defeat of fierce rivals Leinster gave McGrath his first Railway Cup medal.

After back-to-back defeats over the next two years, success returned for Munster in 2000. A narrow 3–15 to 2–15 defeat of Leinster secured a second Railway Cup medal for McGrath. Munster retained the title in 2001, with McGrath collecting a third Railway Cup medal following a 1–21 to 1–15 defeat of Connacht in what was his last appearance for the province.

== Coaching career ==
=== Cork minor ===
McGrath joined John Considine's minor management team as a selector for the 2010 Munster Championship. His two-year tenure with the team ended with early defeats by Waterford and Tipperary.

=== Cork ===
On 1 September 2011, McGrath was named as one of Jimmy Barry-Murphy's selectors with the Cork senior team.

On 6 May 2012, McGrath guided Cork to a National League final meeting with Kilkenny. Cork suffered a 3-21 to 0-16 defeat.

McGrath helped Cork reach the Munster final on 14 July 2013, however, Cork suffered a 0-24 to 0-15 defeat by Limerick. In spite of this defeat, Cork subsequently qualified to meet Clare in the All-Ireland final on 8 September. That game ended in a 3-16 to 0-25 draw, however, Cork suffered a 5-16 to 3-16 defeat in the replay on 28 September.

On 3 July 2014, McGrath enjoyed his first success as a selector when Cork won the Munster Championship after a 2-24 to 0-24 defeat of Limerick in the final.

McGrath stepped down as selector following Jimmy Barry-Murphy's resignation on 29 August 2015.

=== Cork minor ===
McGrath returned as a selector with the Cork minor hurling team for the 2019 Munster Championship.

== Media career ==
In retirement from playing McGrath served as a hurling analyst and pundit on radio, television and in the print media. On radio he was a regular with Newstalk's Off the Ball programme and on Cork's Red FM. On television he was an analyst with Setanta Sports during their coverage of the National League. McGrath also had a weekly column in the Evening Echo

== Career statistics ==
=== Club ===
Team	Season	Cork SHC	
Team	Season	Apps	Score
Glen Rovers	1993	1	0-00
Glen Rovers	1994	3	0-12
Glen Rovers	1995	1	0-02
Glen Rovers	1996	6	1-17
Glen Rovers	1997	1	1-01
Glen Rovers	1998	5	1-14
Glen Rovers	1999	2	0-05
Glen Rovers	2000	2	0-04
Glen Rovers	2001	2	1-02
Glen Rovers	2002	2	1-06
Glen Rovers	2003	2	0-04
Glen Rovers	2004	6	0-10
Glen Rovers	2005	3	0-04
Glen Rovers	2006	2	0-02
Glen Rovers	2007	3	0-00
Glen Rovers	Total	41	5-83
Glen Rovers	Year	Cork JHC	
Glen Rovers	Year	Apps	Score
Glen Rovers	2008	1	0-02
Glen Rovers	Total	1	0-02
Career total		42	5-85

=== Inter-county ===
Team	Year	National League			Munster		All-Ireland		Total	
Team	Year	Division	Apps	Score	Apps	Score	Apps	Score	Apps	Score
Cork Minor	1992	—			1	0-02	—		1	0-02
Cork Minor	1993	—			3	2-07	—		3	2-07
Cork Minor	Total	—			4	2-09	—		4	2-09
Cork U21	1994	—			1	0-00	—		1	0-00
Cork U21	1995	—			1	0-00	—		1	0-00
Cork U21	1996	—			2	0-03	1	1-03	3	1-06
Cork U21	Total	—			4	0-03	1	1-03	5	1-06
Cork	1997	Division 2	6	4-12	1	0-05	—		7	4-17
Cork	1998	Division 1B	7	1-09	2	0-07	—		9	1-16
Cork	1999	Division 1B	6	0-09	2	0-02	2	0-05	10	0-16
Cork	2000	Division 1B	5	2-05	3	1-09	1	0-01	9	3-15
Cork	2001	Division 1B	4	3-07	1	0-02	—		5	3-09
Cork	2002	Division 1B	6	0-10	1	0-00	2	0-00	9	0-10
Cork	2003	Division 1B	7	0-11	0	0-00	2	0-01	9	0-12
Cork	Total		41	10-63	10	1-25	7	0-07	58	11-95
Career total			41	10-63	18	3-37	8	1-10	67	14-110

== Honours ==
=== Team ===
University College Cork

- Fitzgibbon Cup (2): 1997, 1998

Glen Rovers

- City Junior A Hurling Championship (1): 2008
- Cork Under-21 Hurling Championship (1): 1995

Cork

- All-Ireland Senior Hurling Championship (1): 1999
- Munster Senior Hurling Championship (3): 1999, 2000, 2003
- National Hurling League (1): 1998
- Munster Under-21 Hurling Championship (1): 1996 (c)

Munster

- Railway Cup (3): 1997, 2000, 2001

=== Individual ===
Awards

- All-Star (1): 1999

=== Selector ===
- Munster Senior Hurling Championship (1): 2014
