= 1989 Cork Senior Hurling Championship =

Annual hurling competition season

- Dates: 29 April – 1 October 1989
- Teams: 17
- Champions: Glen Rovers (25th title); Tomás Mulcahy (captain); Donie O'Donovan (manager)
- Runners-up: Sarsfields; Vincie Barry (captain); Joe McGrath (manager)

Tournament statistics
- Matches played: 17
- Goals scored: 88 (5.18 per match)
- Points scored: 374 (22 per match)
- Top scorer(s): Tadhg Murphy (3-27)

The 1989 Cork Senior Hurling Championship was the 101st staging of the Cork Senior Hurling Championship since its establishment by the Cork County Board in 1887. The draw for the opening fixtures took place on 18 December 1988. The championship began on 29 April 1989 and ended on 1 October 1989.

St. Finbarr's entered the championship as the defending champions, however, they were beaten by Sarsfields in a semi-final replay.

On 1 October 1989, Glen Rovers won the championship following a 4–15 to 3–13 defeat of Sarsfields in the final. This was their 25th championship title and their first in thirteen championship seasons. This was their 25th championship title overall and their first since 1976.

Sarsfields' Tadhg Murphy was the championship's top scorer with 3-27.

== Results ==
=== First round ===
29 April 1989 First round	Midleton	4-05 - 0-08	University College Cork	Riverstown
	K Hennessy 2-1, J Boylan 1-1, J Fenton 1-1, E Cleary 0-1, G Fitzgerald 0-1.		M Foley 0-5, C Casey 0-2, A Tobin 0-1.	Referee: W Horgan (Brian Dillons)

=== Second round ===
13 May 1989 Second round	St. Finbarr's	2-16 - 2-11	Carrigdhoun	Manning Park, Passage
	F O'Brien 1-2, M Barry 1-2, B Cunningham 0-7, N Leonard 0-3, T Finn 0-1, J Cremin 0-1.		S McCarthy 0-8, L Kelly 2-0, K Kingston 0-2, DJ Kiely 0-1.	Referee: W Horgan (Brian Dillons)

14 May 1989 Second round	Carbery	2-18 - 3-08	Muskerry	Páirc Uí Ríogáin, Ballinspittle
	D O'Connell 2-4, P Crowley 0-5, E Kenneally 0-4, D O'Neill 0-2, F Sheehy 0-1, J O'Connell 0-1, T Brennan 0-1.		G Manley 1-4, J Grainger 1-2, G Hall 1-0, T Barry-Murphy 0-2.

14 May 1989 Second round	Glen Rovers	1-11 - 1-10	Milford	Dr. Mannix Park, Charleville
	C Ring 1-1, T Mulcahy 0-2, K McGuckin 0-2, G O'Riordan 0-2, J Buckley 0-1, J Fitzgibbon 0-1, D Whitley 0-1, C McGuckin 0-1.		V Sheehan 1-3, P Madigan 0-2, S O'Gorman 0-1, N Fitzgibbon 0-1, S Stritch 0-1, G Fitzgibbon 0-1, M Fitzgibbon 0-1.

14 May 1989 Second round	Seandún	4-08 - 1-12	Ballyhea	Dr. Mannix Park, Charleville
	J Corcoran 2-0, P Lynch 1-1, P Walsh 1-1, L Tuohy 0-2, D Murphy 0-1, C Coffey 0-1, T Hurley 0-1, G McCarthy 0-1.		G O'Connor 0-8, D Ryan 1-3, M O'Callaghan 0-1.

21 May 1989 Second round	Imokilly	3-18 - 3-10	Avondhu	Páirc Uí Chaoimh, Cork
	P Cahill 1-6, T Coyne 1-4, G Lee 0-5, C Counihan 1-0, G Lewis 0-3,		P Herbert 2-0, R Sheehan 1-0, P McCormack 0-3, J Walsh 0-2, J Keane 0-2, C Hannon 0-1, D Curtin 0-1, D Coughlan 0-1.	Referee: L O'Flynn (Éire Óg)

21 May 1989 Second round	Blackrock	3-15 - 1-12	Midleton	Páirc Uí Chaoimh, Cork
	F Delaney 2-7, M Kilcoyne 1-0, J Cashman 0-2, M Dineen 0-2, F Collins 0-1, E Kavanagh 0-1, P Deasy 0-1, J Evans 0-1.		D Quirke 0-5, G Fitzgerald 0-4, KR Roche 1-0, K Boqlan 0-1, K Hennessy 0-1, P O'Brien 0-1.	Referee: M Keane (Cloughduv)

21 May 1989 Second round	Erin's Own	3-11 - 3-10	Duhallow	Castletownroche
	C Twohig 2-0, F Horgan 1-1, M Bowen 0-4, J Corcoran 0-2, G Bowen 0-2, PJ Murphy 0-1, R O'Connor 0-1.		T Burke 2-7, J Healy 1-0, J o'Connor 0-1, D Sheahan 0-1, F Keane 0-1.

28 May 1989 Second round	Sarsfields	3-07 - 1-08	Na Piarsaigh	Páirc Uí Chaoimh, Cork
	N Ahern 2-0, T Murphy 1-3, B Lotty 0-1, D Walsh 0-1, D Kenneally 0-1, B Óg Murphy 0-1.		T O'Sullivan 0-6, M Kearney 1-0, J O'Sullivan 0-1, C Connery 0-1.	Referee: W Horgan (Brian Dillons)

=== Quarter-finals ===
9 July 1989 Quarter-final	St. Finbarr's	3-16 - 1-12	Imokilly	Clonmult Memorial Park, Midleton
	B Cunningham 0-8, F O'Brien 1-3, J Meyler 1-2, M Barry 1-1, C Ryan 0-1, F Ramsey 0-1.		P Cahill 0-7, T Hurley 1-0, G Morgan 0-2, G Lewis 0-1, J Lewis 0-1, T Mulcahy 0-1.	Referee: F Murphy (Blackrock)

9 July 1989 Quarter-final	Sarsfields	4-13 - 0-06	Erin's Own	Páirc Uí Chaoimh, Cork
	T Murphy 2-4, N Ahern 1-1, J Barry 1-1, B Óg Murphy 0-3, T McCarthy 0-2, B Lotty 0-2.		R O'Connor 0-2, M Bowen 0-1, F Horgan 0-1, J Corcoran 0-1, PJ Murphy 0-1.	Referee: W Horgan (Brian Dillons)

9 July 1989 Quarter-final	Glen Rovers	3-14 - 3-04	Seandún	Páirc Uí Chaoimh, Cork
	T Mulcahy 2-1, C Ring 1-3, J Fitzgibbon 0-3, P Horgan 0-3, D Whitley 0-3, G O'Riordan 0-1.		P Walsh 2-1, D Murphy 1-0, C Coffey 0-1, P Lynch 0-1, G McCarthy 0-1.

15 July 1989 Quarter-final	Blackrock	3-12 - 1-08	Carbery	Jack Barrett Park, Kinsale
	E Kavanagh 1-2, T Cashman 1-1, M Dineen 1-1, É O'Donoghue 0-3, F Delaney 0-3, J Cashman 0-1, T Deasy 0-1.		D O'Connell 1-1, P Crowley 0-4, G O'Connell 0-2, G Collins 0-1.	Referee: D Collins

=== Semi-finals ===
13 August 1989 Semi-final	Glen Rovers	4-11 - 1-09	Blackrock	Páirc Uí Chaoimh, Cork
	J Fitzgibbon 2-1, K McGuckian 0-7, C Ring 1-0, T Mulcahy 1-0, P Horgan 0-1, G O'Riordan 0-1, J Buckley 0-1.		P Delaney 1-5, E Kavanagh 0-2, M Kilcoyne 0-1, F Collins 0-1.	Referee: G Motherway (Aghada)

27 August 1989 Semi-final	Sarsfields	2-09 - 1-12	St. Finbarr's	Páirc Uí Chaoimh, Cork
	B Óg Murphy 2-1, T Murphy 0-6, P O'Callaghan 0-1, D O'Callaghan 0-1.		B Cunningham 0-8, M Barry 1-0, C Ryan 0-2, É Fitzpatrick 0-1, J Griffin 0-1.	Attendance: 7,000

24 September 1989 Semi-final replay	Sarsfields	2-13 - 3-09	St. Finbarr's	Páirc Uí Chaoimh, Cork
	T Murphy 0-5, B Óg Murphy 1-1, N Ahern 1-1, P O'Callaghan 0-3, B Lotty 0-1, D Kenneally 0-1, T McAuliffe 0-1.		B Cunningham 0-7, T Finn 1-1, É Fitzpatrick 1-0, N Leonard 0-1.	Referee: J O'Leary

=== Final ===
1 October 1989 Final	Glen Rovers	4-15 - 3-13	Sarsfields	Páirc Uí Chaoimh, Cork
	K McGuckin 1-4, J Fitzgibbon 1-3, T Mulcahy 1-1, J O'Brien 1-1, J Buckley 0-3, G O'Riordan 0-2, P Horgan 0-1.		T Murphy 0-9, B Óg Murphy 2-0, N Ahern 1-2, M O'Flynn 0-1 B Lotty 0-1.	Attendance: 25,000; Referee: F Murphy (Blackrock)

== Championship statistics ==
=== Scoring ===
Top scorers overall

Rank	Player	Club	Tally	Total	Matches	Average
1	Tadhg Murphy	Sarsfields	3-27	36	5	7.20
2	Brian Cunningham	St. Finbarr's	0-30	30	4	7.50
3	Finbarr Delaney	Blackrock	3-15	26	3	8.66
4	Bertie Óg Murphy	Sarsfields	5-06	21	5	4.20
5	Niall Ahern	Sarsfields	5-04	19	4	4.75
6	John Fitzgibbon	Glen Rovers	3-08	17	4	4.25
7	Tomás Mulcahy	Glen Rovers	4-04	16	4	4.00
7	Philip Cahill	Imokilly	1-13	16	2	8.00
7	Kieran McGuckin	Glen Rovers	1-13	16	4	4.00
10	Dan O'Connell	Carbery	3-05	14	2	7.00

Top scorers in a single game

Rank	Player	Club	Tally	Total	Opposition
1	Finbarr Delaney	Blackrock	2-07	13	Midleton
1	Timmy Burke	Duhallow	2-07	13	Erin's Own
3	Dan O'Connell	Carbery	2-04	10	Muskerry
3	Tadhg Murphy	Sarsfields	2-04	10	Erin's Own
5	Philip Cahill	Imokilly	1-06	9	Avondhu
6	Finbarr Delaney	Blackrock	1-05	8	Glen Rovers
7	Seánie McCarthy	Carrigdhoun	0-08	8	St. Finbarr's
7	Ger O'Connor	Ballyhea	0-08	8	Seandún
7	Brian Cunningham	St. Finbarr's	0-08	8	Imokilly
7	Brian Cunningham	St. Finbarr's	0-08	8	Sarsfields

=== Miscellaneous ===
- Sarsfields qualified for the final for the first time since 1957.
