= 1993 Cork Senior Hurling Championship =

Annual hurling competition season

- Dates: 28 May 1993 – 17 October 1993
- Teams: 20
- Champions: St. Finbarr's (25th title); Mick Barry (captain); Charlie McCarthy (manager)
- Runners-up: Carbery; Charlie Wilson (captain); Noel Crowley (manager)

Tournament statistics
- Matches played: 24
- Goals scored: 75 (3.13 per match)
- Points scored: 542 (22.58 per match)
- Top scorer(s): Brian Cunningham (0-24)

The 1993 Cork Senior Hurling Championship was the 105th staging of the Cork Senior Hurling Championship since its establishment by the Cork County Board in 1887. The draw for the opening fixtures took place on 13 December 1992. The championship ended on 17 October 1993.

Erin's Own entered the championship as the defending champions.

On 17 October 1993, St. Finbarr's won the championship following a 1–14 to 1–13 defeat of Carbery in a replay of the final. This was their 25th championship title and their first in five championship seasons. It remains their last championship triumph.

== Team changes ==
=== To Championship ===
Promoted from the Cork Intermediate Hurling Championship

- Bishopstown

== Results ==
First round

28 May 1993 First round	Imokilly	3-16 - 0-12	Carrigdhoun	Ballinlough Sportsfield, Cork
	G Lewis 2-2, D Devoy 0-4, C Casey 0-4, P Cahill 1-0, C Clancy 0-3, B Walsh 0-2, J O'Connor 0-1.		S McCarthy 0-4, Denis McCarthy 0-3, Damien McCarthy 0-2, G Cummins 0-1, M Brady 0-1, J O'Mahony 0-1.	Referee: J O'Leary (Na Piarsaigh)

6 June 1993 First round	Duhallow	3-11 - 2-10	Valley Rovers	Coachford Sportsfield, Coachford
	J Linehan 1-3, T Burke 0-5, J O'Connor 1-1, J Sheehan 1-0, T o'Mahony 0-1, I O'Sullivan 0-1.		D Kiely 1-2, A Crowley 0-4, B O'Sullivan 1-0, J Shiels 0-2, L Burke 0-1, C O'Donovan 0-1.	Referee: L O'Flynn (Éire Óg)

18 June 1993 First round	Milford	0-11 - 1-12	Avondhu	Gaels Memorial Grounds, Ballyhea
	V Sheehan 0-5, S Sheehan 0-2, S Stritch 0-1, P Madigan 0-1, S O'Gorman 0-1.		B McCarthy 1-2, B O'Driscoll 0-4, G Buckley 0-4, J Hayes 0-2.	Referee: R Murphy

19 June 1993 First round	University College Cork	1-11 - 1-11	Ballyhea	Fr. Con Buckley Park, Buttevant
	T Coffey 0-5, L Bowe 1-0, S Murphy 0-2, J Maguire 0-2, A Tobin 0-1, J Kiely 0-1.		I Ronan 1-1, P Ryan 0-3, A Morrissey 0-3, J O'Sullivan 0-3, M O'Callaghan 0-1.	Referee: P Spillane (Carrigtwohill)

27 June 1993 First round replay	University College Cork	1-07 - 3-09	Ballyhea	Fr. Con Buckley Park, Buttevant
	T Coffey 0-4, M Salmon 1-0, J Brenner 0-2, T Harrington 0-1.		I Ronan 1-3, D Ronan 1-1, P Ryan 1-1, A Morrissey 0-2, M O'Callaghan 0-1, J Mortell 0-1.	Referee: R Murphy

Second round

28 May 1993 Second round	Seandún	3-08 - 4-10	Muskerry	Ballincollig
	B Egan 1-5, M Huggins 1-1, K Hyland 1-0, G Healy 0-1, W Leahy 0-1.		P O'Flynn 2-0, P O'Mahony 0-4, G Nagle 1-0, L Dromey 1-0, T Barry-Murphy 0-3, J O'Callaghan 0-2, D Lucey 0-1.	Referee: P O'Neill (Shamrocks)

19 June 1993 Second round	Imokilly	1-06 - 1-16	Carbery	Cloughduv
	R Dwane 1-1, G Lewis 0-2, P Cahill 0-1, R Lewis 0-1, C Clancy 0-1.		B Harte 0-5, P Crowley 0-4, P Kenneally 0-4, D O'Connell 1-0, D Healy 0-2, D O'Neill 0-1.	Referee: J O'Leary (Na Piarsaigh)

9 July 1993 Second round	Ballyhea	1-09 - 3-09	Avondhu	Mannix Park, Charleville
	1-0 (og), M O'Callaghan 0-3, A Morrissey 0-3, D Ronan 0-2, D O'Riordan 0-1.		B McCarthy 2-1, J Ryan 1-0, N O'Brien 0-3, R O'Connell 0-2, J Buckley 0-2, J Walsh 0-1.	Referee: M O'Flaherty

10 July 1993 Second round	St. Finbarr's	3-16 - 1-12	Sarsfields	Páirc Uí Rinn, Cork
	P Forde 2-1, B Cunningham 0-7, M Barry 1-1, F Ramsey 0-4, E Griffin 0-2, B O'Shea 0-1.		N Ahern 0-7, T McAuliffe 1-0, P O'Callaghan 0-2, T McCarthy 0-1, C Byron 0-1, T Murphy 0-1.

11 July 1993 Second round	Na Piarsaigh	3-09 - 2-04	Glen Rovers	Páirc Uí Chaoimh, Cork
	M O'Sullivan 1-2, R Sweeney 1-1, J O'Connor 1-0, Mark Mullins 0-2, G Maguire 0-2, Mick Mullins 0-2.		K Fitzgibbon 2-0, G O'Riordan 0-2, J Fox 0-1, T Mulcahy 0-1.	Referee: J Motherway (Aghada)

11 July 1993 Second round	Blackrock	4-11 - 1-13	Duhallow	Carrowkeel Sportsfield, Mallow
	E Kavanagh 2-0, J Murphy 1-1, N O'Leary 1-0, M Harrington 0-3, A Browne 0-3, J Smith 0-2, J Cashman 0-1, D Downey 0-1.		T Burke 0-5, J O'Mahony 1-0, M Doyle 0-4, E Geaney 0-2, T O'Mahony 0-1, J Lenihan 0-1.	Referee: D Relihan (Castletownroche)

11 July 1993 Second round	Midleton	1-11 - 1-11	Bishopstown	Cobh
	P O'Brien 0-6, K Hennessy 1-1, M O'Mahony 0-2, G Fitzgerald 0-1, J Boylan 0-1.		O O'Farrell 1-2, O O'Mahony 0-5, A O'Sullivan 0-2, J Ryan 0-2.	Referee: G Harrington (Carrigaline)

20 July 1993 Second round	Erin's Own	3-17 - 0-14	Tracton	Páirc Uí Chaoimh, Cork
	PJ Murphy 3-3, B Corcoran 0-6, J Corcoran 0-4, G Bowen 0-1, M Nichol 0-1, F Horgan 0-1, P Geasley 0-1.		P Murphy 0-6, K Kingston 0-3, M Quinn 0-3, DJ Kiely 0-1, L Kelly 0-1.	Referee: J O'Leary (Na Piarsaigh)

18 July 1993 Second round replay	Bishopstown	2-09 - 1-08	Midleton	Cobh
	E O'Farrell 0-5, V Murray 1-0, L Meaney 1-0, J Ryan 0-1, C Coffey 0-1, A O'Sullivan 0-1, K O'Donoghue 0-1.		G Manley 1-2, M O'Mahony 0-2, G Fitzgerald 0-2, C O'Neill 0-1, D Quirke 0-1.	Referee: G Harrington (Carrigaline)

Quarter-finals

25 July 1993 Quarter-final	Na Piarsaigh	4-13 - 2-06	Muskerry	Páirc Liam Mhic Chárthaigh, B'garvan
	M Mullins 1-2, M O'Sullivan 1-2, J O'Connor 1-1, G Daly 1-1, T O'Sullivan 0-4, R Sweeney 0-2, P O'Connor 0-1.		T Barry-Murphy 1-1, P O'Flynn 1-0, B Sheehan 0-2, G Nagle 0-1, P Martin 0-1, D Murphy 0-1.	Referee: J Motherway (Aghada)

25 July 1993 Quarter-final	Carbery	2-07 - 1-07	Blackrock	Jack Barret Park, Kinsale
	C Murphy 1-0, M Foley 1-0, P Crowley 0-3, D O'Donoghue 0-2, B Harte 0-2.		M Dineen 1-1, A Browne 0-2, D Downey 0-1, A Ryan 0-1, J Smith 0-1, D O'Sullivan 0-1.	Referee: G Harrington (Carrigaline)

28 July 1993 Quarter-final	St. Finbarr's	0-14 - 1-06	Bishopstown	Páirc Uí Chaoimh, Cork
	B Cunningham 0-9, B O'Shea 0-2, F Ramsey 0-1, M Barry 0-1, P Forde 0-1.		K O'DOnoghue 1-0, M O'Connor 0-2, M Lyons 0-1, C Coffey 0-1, D O'Mahony 0-1, A O'Sullivan 0-1.	Referee: W Horgan (Brian Dillons)

1 August 1993 Quarter-final	Avondhu	3-11 - 3-11	Erin's Own	Páirc Mac Gearailt, Fermoy
	B McCarthy 2-1, G Morrissey 1-0, R O'Connell 0-3, R Sheehan 0-3, G Buckley 0-2, N O'Brien 0-1, F McCormack 0-1.		B Corcoran 1-3, B O'Neill 1-2, PJ Murphy 1-1, J Corcoran 0-3, J Dillon 0-1, P Geasley 0-1.	Referee: M O'Flaherty (Blackrock)

28 August 1993 Quarter-final replay	Avondhu	2-16 - 0-14	Erin's Own	Páirc Mac Gearailt, Fermoy
	R O'Connell 0-7, J Hayes 1-1, G Buckley 1-0, R Sheehan 0-3, J Walsh 0-2, J Sheehan 0-2, F McCormack 0-1.		B Corcoran 0-8, J Corcoran 0-2, J Corcoran 0-1, G Bowen 0-1, PJ Murphy 0-1, K Murphy 0-1.	Referee: M O'Flaherty (Blackrock)

Semi-finals

29 August 1993 Semi-final	Carbery	1-10 - 1-10	Na Piarsaigh	Páirc Uí Chaoimh, Cork
	B Harte 1-0, D O'Donoghue 0-2, G O'Connell 0-2, C Murphy 0-2, M Foley 0-1, D O'Connell 0-1, M Holland 0-1, J O'Sullivan 0-1.		T O'Sullivan 1-5, R Sweeney 0-2, Mark Mullins 0-1, P Kelleher 0-1, G Maguire 0-1.	Referee: G Harrington (Cork)

4 September 1993 Semi-final	St. Finbarr's	2-09 - 0-14	Avondhu	Carrigtwohill
	B Cunningham 0-7, M Barry 2-0, M Quaid 0-1, B O'Shea 0-1.		R O'Connell 0-8, R Sheehan 0-2, N O'Brien 0-2, J Hayes 0-1, M Noonan 0-1.	Referee: L O'Flynn (Éire Óg)

26 September 1993 Semi-final replay	Carbery	1-14 - 0-16	Na Piarsaigh	Páirc Uí Chaoimh, Cork
	D O'Donoghue 1-7, D O'Connell 0-4, J O'Connell 0-1, J O'Sullivan 0-1, C Murphy 0-1.		T O'Sullivan 0-8, Mark Mullins 0-2, Mick Mullins 0-2, R Sweeney 0-1, M O'Sullivan 0-1, C O'Donovan 0-1, M Dineen 0-1.

Final

10 October 1993 Final	St. Finbarr's	1-17 - 1-17	Carbery	Páirc Uí Chaoimh, Cork
	I O'Mahony 1-3, F Ramsey 0-4, B O'Shea 0-4, M Barry 0-2, J O'Connor 0-1, P Ford 0-1, B Cunningham 0-1, S O'Leary 0-1.		P Crowley 0-7, J O'Connell 1-1, D O'Donoghue 0-3, D O'Neill 0-2, D O'Connell 0-2, C Murphy 0-1, B Harte 0-1.	Attendance: 12,000; Referee: L O'Flynn

17 October 1993 Final replay	St. Finbarr's	1-14 - 1-13	Carbery	Páirc Uí Chaoimh, Cork
	B O'Shea 0-7, M Quaid 1-1, E Griffin 0-2, M Barry 0-2, M Ryan 0-1, I O'Mahony 0-1.		P Crowley 1-4, D O'Donoghue 0-3, D O'Connell 0-2, C Murphy 0-2, M Foley 0-1.

== Championship statistics ==
=== Top scorers ===
Overall

Rank	Player	Club	Tally	Total	Matches	Average
1	Brian Cunningham	St. Finbarr's	0-24	24	4	6.00
2	Pádraig Crowley	Carbery	1-18	21	6	3.50
3	Tony O'Sullivan	Na Piarsaigh	1-17	20	3	6.66
3	Brian Corcoran	Erin's Own	1-17	20	3	6.66
3	Darren O'Donoghue	Carbery	1-17	20	6	3.33
3	Ray O'Connell	Avondhu	0-20	20	5	4.00
7	Billy McCarthy	Avondhu	5-04	19	5	3.80
8	P. J. Murphy	Erin's Own	4-05	17	3	5.66
9	Mick Barry	St. Finbarr's	3-06	15	5	3.00
9	Billy O'Shea	St. Finbarr's	0-15	15	5	3.00

In a single game

Rank	Player	Club	Tally	Total	Opposition
1	P. J. Murphy	Erin's Own	3-03	12	Tracton
2	Darren O'Donoghue	Carbery	1-07	10	Na Piarsaigh
3	Brian Cunningham	St. Finbarr's	0-09	9	Bishopstown
4	Ger Lewis	Imokilly	2-02	8	Carrigdhoun
4	Barry Egan	Seandún	1-05	8	Muskerry
4	Tony O'Sullivan	Na Piarsaigh	1-05	8	Carbery
4	Ray O'Connell	Avondhu	0-08	8	St. Finbarr's
4	Brian Corcoran	Erin's Own	0-08	8	Avondhu
4	Tony O'Sullivan	Na Piarsaigh	0-08	8	Carbery
10	Billy McCarthy	Avondhu	2-01	7	Ballyhea
10	Paul Forde	St. Finbarr's	2-01	7	Sarsfields
10	Billy McCarthy	Avondhu	2-01	7	Erin's Own
10	Pádraig Crowley	Carbery	1-04	7	St. Finbarr's
10	Brian Cunningham	St. Finbarr's	0-07	7	Avondhu
10	Ray O'Connell	Avondhu	0-07	7	Erin's Own
10	Niall Ahern	Sarsfields	0-07	7	St. Finbarr's
10	Brian Cunningham	St. Finbarr's	0-07	7	Sarsfields
10	Billy O'Shea	St. Finbarr's	0-07	7	Carbery
10	Pádraig Crowley	Carbery	0-07	7	St. Finbarr's

=== Miscellaneous ===
- Bishopstown make their first appearance in the SHC.
- Carbery qualify for the final for the first time.
