= 1994 Cork Senior Hurling Championship =

Annual hurling competition season

- Dates: 29 April – 11 September 1994
- Teams: 20
- Sponsor: TSB Bank
- Champions: Carbery (1st title); Barry Harte (captain); Noel Crowley (manager)
- Runners-up: Midleton; Ger Power (captain); Ollie O'Keeffe (manager)

Tournament statistics
- Matches played: 20
- Goals scored: 72 (3.6 per match)
- Points scored: 485 (24.25 per match)
- Top scorer(s): Brian Cunningham (4-13)

The 1994 Cork Senior Hurling Championship was the 106th staging of the Cork Senior Hurling Championship since its establishment by the Cork County Board in 1887. The draw for the opening fixtures took place on 12 December 1994. The championship ended on 11 September 1994.

St. Finbarr's entered the championship as the defending champions, however, they were defeated by Midleton in the semi-finals.

The final was played on 11 September 1994 at Páirc Uí Chaoimh in Cork, between Carbery and Midleton, in what was their first ever meeting in the final. Carbery won the match by 3–13 to 3–06 to claim their first ever championship title. It remans their only championship title.

Brian Cunningham was the championship's top scorer with 4–13.

== Team changes ==
=== To Championship ===
Promoted from the Cork Intermediate Hurling Championship

- Youghal

== Results ==
=== First round ===
29 April 1994 First round	University College Cork	4-11 - 1-06	Seandún	Páirc Uí Rinn
	G Maguire 1-5, E O'Neill 2-1, K Morrison 1-3, E Enright 0-1, T O'Connell 0-1.		M McElhinney 1-2, G Healy 0-2, T Gould 0-1, G McAuliffe 0-1.	Referee: M O'Flaherty (Blackrock)

11 June 1994 First round	Tracton	2-11 - 0-20	Muskerry	Charlie Hurley Park
	DJ Kiely 0-5, P Murphy 1-2, J O'Callaghan 1-0, K Kingston 0-3, J Kingston 0-1.		A Murphy 0-6, J O'Callaghan 0-5, K Murray 0-4, D Slyne 0-2, T Barry-Murphy 0-2, B Sheehan 0-1.	Referee: S Crean (Bandon)

12 June 1994 First round	Imokilly	1-07 - 0-10	Bishopstown	Caherlag Sportsfield
	J Smiddy 1-1, R Lewis 0-3, C Casey 0-2, JJ Kearney 0-1.		K O'Donoghue 0-7, J Ryan 0-1, D O'Mahony 0-1, A O'Sullivan 0-1	Referee: D Relihan (Castletownroche)

12 June 1994 First round	Glen Rovers	2-11 - 1-13	Erin's Own	Páirc Uí Chaoimh
	S McGrath 0-5, J Fox 1-1, G Riordan 0-4, T Mulcahy 1-0, R Kelleher 0-1.		B Corcoran 0-7, F Horgan 1-1, P Geasley 0-3, PJ Murphy 0-1, T Kelleher 0-1.	Referee: J O'Leary (Na Piarsaigh)

25 June 1994 First round replay	Imokilly	1-11 - 1-08	Bishopstown	Caherlag Sportsfield
	B Walsh 1-1, J Smiddy 0-4, R Lewis 0-3, D Motherway 0-1, M Landers 0-1, T McAuliffe 0-1, P Cahill 0-1.		K O'Donoghue 0-4, V Murray 1-0, A O'Sullivan 0-1, T O'Leary 0-1, M Hayes 0-1, L Meaney 0-1.	Referee: D Relihan (Castletownroche)

=== Second round ===
22 May 1994 Second round	Midleton	1-11 - 1-10	Carrigdhoun	Páirc Uí Rinn
	P O'Brien 1-1, G Manley 0-4, D Quirke 0-3, G Fitzgerald 0-2, N O'Neill 0-1.		Damien McCarthy 0-7, Denis McCarthy 1-0, A O'Driscoll 0-1, S McCarthy 0-1, C O'Donovan 0-1.	Referee: W Horgan (Brian Dillons)

12 June 1994 Second round	Na Piarsaigh	2-15 - 2-13	Sarsfields	Páirc Uí Chaoimh
	G Maguire 2-0, M Mullins 0-6, T O'Sullivan 0-3, P O'Connor 0-2, G Daly 0-2, J O'Connor 0-1, K Butterworth 0-1/		N Ahern 1-10, R Lotty 1-0, B O'Callaghan 0-1, T McCarthy 0-1, B Óg Murphy 0-1.	Referee: L O'Flynn (Éire Óg)

25 June 1994 Second round	Blackrock	5-25 - 0-05	Duhallow	Carrowkeel Sportsfield
	A Browne 3-4, A Ryan 2-1, A Cummins 0-6, J O'Donoghue 0-6, J Cashman 0-3, F Ryan 0-3, N O'Leary 0-1, M Harrington 0-1.		C Buckley 0-4, T Burke 0-1.	Referee: L O'Flynn (Éire Óg)

25 June 1994 Second round	Avondhu	3-14 - 0-07	Muskerry	Páirc Uí Rinn
	B McCarthy 3-1, R Sheehan 0-7, R O'Connell 0-2, G Buckley 0-2, F McCormack 0-1, N O'Brien 0-1.		A Murphy 0-2, M Sheehan 0-2, P O'Flynn 0-1, T Barry-Murphy 0-1, D Slyne 0-1.	Referee: J Motherway (aghada)

25 June 1994 Second round	St. Finbarr's	1-20 - 1-11	Youghal	Clonmult Memorial Park
	B Cunningham 1-4, I O'Mahony 0-4, B O'Shea 0-2, M Ryan 0-2, M Quaid 0-2, E Griffin 0-2, F Ramsey 0-1, N Hosford 0-1, M Barry 0-1, P McSweeney 0-1.		E Coleman 0-6, T Coyne 1-2, B Hogan 0-1, N Hogan 0-1, M Downing 0-1.	Referee: W Horgan (Brian Dillons)

25 June 1994 Second round	Carbery	1-20 - 3-09	Ballyhea	Páirc Uí Rinn
	P Crowley 0-6, D Fleming 1-1, P Kenneally 0-5, C Murphy 0-3, D O'Donoghue 0-2, D O'Connell 0-2, G O'Connell 0-1.		D O'Flynn 1-0, M O'Callaghan 1-0, D Hanley 1-0, I Ronan 0-3, A Morrissey 0-3, D Ronan 0-1, T Brassil 0-1, A O'Connor 0-1.	Referee: P Spillane (Carrigtwohill)

16 July 1994 Second round	Glen Rovers	3-17 - 2-11	Milford	Páirc Mac Gearailt
	S O'Riordan 0-7, S McGrath 0-5, T Harte 1-1, R Kelleher 1-1, K McGuckin 1-1, G O'Riordan 0-2.		G Fitzgibbon 1-1, V Sheehan 1-1, S O'Gorman 0-4, D O'Brien 0-2, P Buckley 0-2, M Fitzgibbon 0-1.	Referee: P Spillane (Carrigtwohill)

18 July 1994 Second round	University College Cork	1-11 - 1-15	Imokilly	Riverstown Sportsfield
	K Morrison 1-3, J Brenner 0-4, E Enright 0-1, G Maguire 0-1, D Quigley 0-1, T Harrington 0-1.		R Lewis 0-10, T McAuliffe 1-1, M Landers 0-2, K O'Keeffe 0-1, O O'Mahony 0-1.	Referee: W Horgan (Brian Dillons)

=== Quarter-finals ===
23 July 1994 Quarter-final	Na Piarsaigh	2-15 - 1-16	Blackrock	Páirc Uí Chaoimh
	T O'Sullivan 0-8, G Maguire 1-1, G Daly 1-0, M Mullins 0-3, J O'Connor 0-1, L Forde 0-1, P O'Connor 0-1.		A Browne 0-8, N O'Leary 0-5, A Cummins 1-1, E Kavanagh 0-1, J Cashman 0-1.	Referee: P Spillane (Carrigtwohill)

31 July 1994 Quarter-final	Carbery	1-13 - 2-08	Glen Rovers	Páirc Uí Chaoimh
	P Crowley 0-5, D Fleming 1-0, D O'Donoghue 0-2, P Kenneally 0-2, J O'Connell 0-2, C Murphy 0-1, M Foley 0-1.		K McGuckin 1-2, T Mulcahy 1-0, C Riordan 0-3, S McGrath 0-2, B O'Connell 0-1.	Referee: M O'Flaherty (Blackrock)

6 August 1994 Quarter-final	Midleton	4-11 - 3-13	Avondhu	Páirc Uí Chaoimh
	G Fitzgerald 1-4, C Quirke 1-2, D Quirke 1-1, J Boylan 1-0, K Roche 0-2, D Curran 0-1, P O'Brien 0-1.		N O'Brien 2-1, R Sheehan 0-5, B O'Driscoll 1-0, F McCormack 0-2, J Walsh 0-2, R O'Connell 0-2, G Buckley 0-1.	Referee: J O'Leary (Na Piarsaigh)

12 August 1994 Quarter-final	St. Finbarr's	3-15 - 2-09	Imokilly	Páirc Uí Chaoimh
	B Cunningham 1-4, E Griffin 1-2, I O'Mahony 1-1, M Ryan 0-3, F Ramsey 0-3, M Barry 0-1, B O'Shea 0-1.		M Landers 1-1, R Lewis 0-4, M Treacy 1-0, JJ Kearney 0-2, B Walsh 0-1, S Barrett 0-1.

=== Semi-finals ===
21 August 1994 Semi-final	Carbery	3-14 - 2-13	Na Piarsaigh	Páirc Uí Chaoimh
	D O'Connell 2-2, P Crowley 0-5, J O'Sullivan 1-0, P Kenneally 0-3, B Harte 0-2, D O'Donoghue 0-2.		T O'Sullivan 0-10, G Daly 2-0, L Forde 0-1, C Lynch 0-1, M O'Sullivan 0-1.	Attendance: 5,243; Referee: W Horgan (Brian Dillons)

27 August 1994 Semi-final	Midleton	1-11 - 2-07	St. Finbarr's	Páirc Uí Chaoimh
	G Manley 0-4, K Hennessy 1-0, D Quirke 0-2, M O'Mahony 0-2, G Fitzgerald 0-2, Cormac Quirke 0-1.		B Cunningham 2-5, M Ryan 0-1, B O'Shea 0-1.

=== Final ===
11 September 1994 Final	Carbery	3-12 - 3-06	Midleton	Páirc Uí Chaoimh
	J O'Connell 2-1, D O'Connell 1-0, C Murphy 0-3, P Kenneally 0-2, P Crowley 0-2, M Holland 0-1, T Crowley 0-1, D O'Neill 0-1, D O'Donoghue 0-1.		G Manley 1-4, D Quirke 1-1, M O'Mahony 1-0, P Smith 0-1.	Attendance: 17,889; Referee: J O'Leary (Na Piarsaigh)

== Championship statistics ==
=== Top scorers ===
Overall

Rank	Player	Club	Tally	Total	Matches	Average
1	Brian Cunningham	St. Finbarr's	4-13	25	3	8.33
2	Alan Browne	Blackrock	3-12	21	2	10.50
2	Tony O'Sullivan	Na Piarsaigh	0-21	21	3	7.00
4	Richie Lewis	Imokilly	0-20	20	4	5.00
5	Pádraig Crowley	Carbery	0-18	18	4	4.50
6	Ger Manley	Midleton	1-12	15	3	5.00
7	Niall Ahern	Sarsfields	1-10	13	1	13.00
7	Dan O'Connell	Carbery	3-04	13	4	3.25
9	Kieran Morrison	UCC	2-06	12	2	6.00
9	Ronan Sheehan	Avondhu	0-12	12	2	6.00
9	Seánie McGrath	Blackrock	0-12	12	3	4.00

In a single game

Rank	Player	Club	Tally	Total	Opposition
1	Alan Browne	Blackrock	3-04	13	Duhallow
1	Niall Ahern	Sarsfields	1-10	13	Na Piarsaigh
3	Brian Cunningham	St. Finbarr's	2-05	11	Midleton
4	Billy McCarthy	Avondhu	3-01	10	Muskerry
4	Richie Lewis	Imokilly	0-10	10	UCC
4	Tony O'Sullivan	Na Piarsaigh	0-10	10	Carbery
7	Dan O'Connell	Carbery	2-02	8	Na Piarsaigh
7	Gerry Maguire	UCC	1-05	8	Seandún
7	Tony O'Sullivan	Na Piarsaigh	0-08	8	Blackrock
7	Alan Browne	Blackrock	0-08	8	Na Piarsaigh

=== Miscellaneous ===
- Carbery win their first title and in the process become the first, and to date, only West Cork side to win a SHC title.
