= 1998 Cork Senior Hurling Championship =

Annual hurling competition season

- Dates: 4 June 1998 – 1 November 1998
- Teams: 22
- Champions: Imokilly (2nd title); William O'Riordan (captain); Seánie O'Leary (manager)
- Runners-up: Blackrock; Fergal Ryan (captain); Michael O'Brien (manager)

Tournament statistics
- Matches played: 23
- Goals scored: 66 (2.87 per match)
- Points scored: 556 (24.17 per match)
- Top scorer(s): Brian Cunningham (3-23)

The 1998 Cork Senior Hurling Championship was the 110th staging of the Cork Senior Hurling Championship since its establishment by the Cork County Board in 1887. The draw for the opening fixtures took place on 14 December 1997. The championship ended on 1 November 1998.

Imokilly entered the championship as the defending champions.

On 1 November 1998, Imokilly won the championship following a 1–10 to 1–05 defeat of Blackrock in the final. This was their second championship title overall and their second in succession. I Brian Cunningham of St. Finbarr's was the championship's top scorer with 3-23.

== Team changes ==
=== To Championship ===
Promoted from the Cork Intermediate Hurling Championship

- Cloyne

== Results ==
First round

6 June 1998 First round	Duhallow	1-13 - 0-12	Glen Rovers	Buttevant
	R Kelleher 1-5, C O'Riordan 0-4, J Anderson 0-2, S McGrath 0-2.		T O'Mahony 0-3, C Buckley 0-3, T Burke 0-2, G Angland 0-2, W King 0-1, D Crowley 0-1.	Referee: L O'Flynn (Éire Óg)

6 June 1998 First round	Midleton	1-11 - 1-13	Muskerry	Páirc Uí Rinn, Cork
	M O'Connell 1-4, G Manley 0-3, V Reddy 0-2, M Quirke 0-1, D Quirke 0-1.		F Kelly 1-7, K Murray 0-4, J O'Mahony 0-1, J Hurley 0-1.	Referee: W Horgan (Brian Dillons)

28 June 1998 First round	University College Cork	2-17 - 1-11	Bishopstown	Páirc Uí Chaoimh, Cork
	J Enright 1-12, J Murphy 1-0, J Deane 0-2, J Murray 0-2, J Burke 0-1.		D O'Mahony 1-5, M Hayes 0-2, C Doyle 0-1, M Cogan 0-1, V Murray 0-1, K O'Donoghue 0-1.	Referee: P Spillane (Carrigtwohill)

4 July 1998 First round	Newtownshandrum	1-11 - 3-09	Cloyne	Moore Park, Kilworth
	J O'Connor 1-4, B O'Connor 0-7.		V Cusack 2-0, E Canavan 0-4, B Motherway 1-0, D O'Sullivan 0-3, J Cotter 0-1, A O'Brien 0-1.	Referee: P Nolan (Na Piarsaigh)

6 July 1998 First round	Carrigdhoun	3-11 - 1-08	Cork Institute of Technology	Manning Park, Passage
	G Cummins 0-4, N Murphy 1-0, M Kingston 1-0, B Hayes 1-0, R O'Donovan 0-3, J Kingston 0-2, A McCarthy 0-1, E Carey 0-1.		E O'Neill 1-4, F Cantwell 0-2, R Tynan 0-1, E Carey 0-1.	Referee: D O'Leary (Cloughduv)

10 July 1998 First round	Seandún	3-16 - 1-10	Erin's Own	Páirc Uí Rinn, Cork
	J O'Driscoll 1-3, J Egan 1-2, T Twomey 1-1, B Egan 0-4, G Healy 0-3, T Finnegan 0-1, A Costello 0-1, M O'Driscoll 0-1.		P Kelly 0-4, P Collins 1-0, K Murphy 0-2, T O'Keeffe 0-1, T Kelleher 0-1, B Corcoran 0-1, J Corcoran 0-1.	Referee: G Harrington

Second round

4 June 1998 Second round	Avondhu	2-08 - 2-11	Carbery	Coachford Sportsfield, Coachford
	R O'Connell 0-5, R Sheehan 1-0, D Moher 1-0, F McCormack 0-2, B O'Driscoll 0-1.		C Murphy 1-4, M Walsh 1-1, D O'Donoghue 0-3, J Nyhan 0-1, P Condon 0-1, T Crowley 0-1.	Referee: D Kirwan (Éire Óg)

27 June 1998 Second round	Sarsfields	2-11 - 1-14	Glen Rovers	Páirc Uí Chaoimh, Cork
	J O'Flynn 1-0, J Barry 1-0, P Gahan 0-3, J Murphy 0-2, T Óg Lynch 0-2, P Ryan 0-2, G McCarthy 0-1, B O'Callaghan 0-1.		C O'Riordan 0-6, R Kelleher 1-1, J Anderson 0-3, T Mulcahy 0-2, S McGrath 0-2.	Referee: L O'Flynn (Éire Óg)

28 June 1998 Second round	Ballyhea	2-11 - 2-12	St. Catherine's	Kildorrery
	N Ronan 1-7, M O'Callaghan 1-2, D Ronan 0-2.		C Casey 1-5, K Morrison 0-4, D O'Connell 1-0, J Sheehan 0-2, M Hegarty 0-1.	Referee: W Horgan (Brian Dillons)

3 July 1998 Second round	St. Finbarr's	3-18 - 2-13	Muskerry	Páirc Uí Chaoimh, Cork
	B Cunningham 0-9, C Duffy 1-2, F O'Mahony 1-1, C McCarthy 1-0, M Ryan 0-3, E Fitzpatrick 0-2, J Griffin 0-1.		K Murray 2-5, D O'Leary 0-2, B Sheehan 0-2, F Kelly 0-2, J O'Mahony 0-1, T O'Mahony 0-1.	Referee: W Horgan (Brian Dillons)

18 July 1998 Second round	Kilbrittain	2-06 - 2-18	Seandún	Páirc Uí Chaoimh, Cork
	D O'Connell 1-3, M Holland 1-1, N Crowley 0-1, J McSweeney 0-1.		B Egan 0-9, J Egan 1-2, J Horgan 1-0, G Healy 0-2, J O'Driscoll 0-2, T Twomey 0-2, M O'Driscoll 0-1.	Referee: P O'Neill (Shamrocks)

19 July 1998 Second round	Imokilly	3-12 - 0-09	Cloyne	Clonmult Memorial Park, Midleton
	E Fitzgerald 2-1, T McCarthy 1-1, J Smiddy 0-3, D Irwin 0-2, M Walsh 0-2, D Barrett 0-1, M Landers 0-1, B Coleman 0-1.		E Canavan 0-6, D O'Sullivan 0-1, E O'Sullivan 0-1, P Cahill 0-1.	Referee: L O'Flynn (Éire Óg)

25 July 1998 Second round	Blackrock	0-18 - 2-08	Carrigdhoun	Páirc Uí Rinn, Cork
	A Browne 0-7, A Coughlan 0-6, B O'Keeffe 0-1, A Cummins 0-1, J O'Flynn 0-1, B Hennebrey 0-1, J Cashman 0-1.		R O'Donovan 0-5, N Murphy 1-0, A McCarthy 1-0, G Cummins 0-2, J Kingston 0-1.	Referee: D Kirwan (Éire Óg)

2 August 1998 Second round	Na Piarsaigh	0-15 - 2-16	University College Cork	Páirc Uí Chaoimh, Cork
	M Mullins 0-8, T Ó hAilpín 0-2, G Daly 0-2, T O'Sullivan 0-1, K Lynch 0-1, C Connery 0-1.		J Enright 1-8, J Deane 1-1, D Bennett 0-4, J Murphy 0-2, E Enright 0-1.	Referee: D O'Leary (Cloughduv)

2 August 1998 Second round replay	Sarsfields	0-12 - 3-17	Glen Rovers	Páirc Uí Chaoimh, Cork
	P Ryan 0-5, J Murphy 0-3, B O'Callaghan 0-1, J J Barry 0-1, P Roche 0-1, J Flynn 0-1.		C O'Riordan 1-6, S McGrath 1-6, R Kelleher 1-2, D Cooper 0-1, K O'Callaghan 0-1, G O'Riordan 0-1.	Referee: L O'Flynn (Éire Óg)

Quarter-finals

1 August 1998 Quarter-final	Carbery	0-16 - 1-13	St. Finbarr's	Riverstick
	C Murphy 0-8, D O'Donoghue 0-3, M Walsh 0-2, K Long 0-1, T Coffey 0-1, J Crowley 0-1.		B Cunningham 1-5, B O'Shea 0-2, A O'Regan 0-1, F Lehane 0-1, M Ryan 0-1, P McSweeney 0-1, C Duffy 0-1, K Kelleher 0-1.	Referee: L O'Flynn (Éire Óg)

2 August 1998 Quarter-final	Imokilly	2-11 - 1-05	Seandún	Páirc Uí Rinn, Cork
	E Fitzgerald 0-4, M Landers 1-0, J O'Connor 1-0, T McCarthy 0-3, M Daly 0-2, S O'Farrell 0-1, B Coleman 0-1.		M Barry 1-0, B Egan 0-3, T Twomey 0-1, K Hyland 0-1.	Referee: G Harrington (Carrigaline)

8 August 1998 Quarter-final	Blackrock	1-09 - 0-11	St. Catherine's	Carrigtwohill
	A Coughlan 0-5, C O'Flaherty 1-0, J O'Flynn 0-2, J Cashman 0-1, A Brown 0-1.		C Clancy 0-8, K Morrison 0-2, C Casey 0-1.	Referee: W Horgan (Brian Dillons)

15 August 1998 Quarter-final replay	St. Finbarr's	3-13 - 0-14	Carbery	Riverstick
	B Cunningham 2-5, M Barry 1-0, B O'Shea 0-2, P McSweeney 0-2, F O'Mahony 0-1, A O'Regan 0-1, M Ryan 0-1, C McCarthy 0-1.		C Murphy 0-7, D O'Donoghue 0-3, P Kenneally 0-2, J Crowley 0-1, M Walsh 0-1.	Referee: L O'Flynn (Éire Óg)

30 August 1998 Quarter-final	Glen Rovers	0-16 - 0-14	University College Cork	Páirc Uí Chaoimh, Cork
	C O'Riordan 0-4, K O'Callaghan 0-4, J Anderson 0-2, T Murphy 0-2, S McGrath 0-2, T Mulcahy 0-1, R Kelleher 0-1.		J Deane 0-6, D Bennett 0-3, D McGrath 0-2, S Fitzpatrick 0-2, S Ryan 0-1.	Referee: J Motherway (Aghada)

Semi-finals

30 August 1998 Semi-final	Imokilly	3-17 - 3-08	St. Finbarr's	Páirc Uí Chaoimh, Cork
	E Fitzgerald 1-7, M Daly 1-2, T McCarthy 0-5, M Landers 1-1, J O'Connor 0-1, R Dwane 0-1.		E Fitzpatrick 2-0, B Cunningham 0-4, C McCarthy 1-0, A O'Regan 0-2, P McSweeney 0-1, J McCarthy 0-1.	Referee: L O'Flynn (Éire Óg)

11 October 1998 Semi-final	Blackrock	1-14 - 1-11	Glen Rovers	Páirc Uí Chaoimh, Cork
	A Browne 1-5, J O'Flynn 0-3, A Coughlan 0-3, D Dempsey 0-2, J Cashman 0-1.		C O'Riordan 0-4, R Kelleher 1-0, D Cooper 0-2, J Anderson 0-2, S McGrath 0-2, C O'Callaghan 0-1.

Final

1 November 1998 Final	Imokilly	1-10 - 1-5	Blackrock	Páirc Uí Chaoimh, Cork
	S O'Farrell (1-1), M Landers (0-3), D Barrett (0-2), T McCarthy (0-1), M Daly (0-1), B Coleman (0-1), E Fitzgerald (0-1).	Report	A Browne (1-1), J O'Flynn (0-1), A Coughlan (0-1), B O'Keeffe (0-1), J Cashman (0-1).

== Championship statistics ==
=== Top scorers ===
Overall

Rank	Player	Club	Tally	Total	Matches	Average
1	Brian Cunningham	St. Finbarr's	3-23	32	4	8.00
2	Conor O'Riordan	Glen Rovers	1-24	27	5	5.40
3	Johnny Enright	UCC	2-20	26	2	13.00
4	Eoin Fitzgerald	Imokilly	3-13	22	4	5.50
5	Richie Kelleher	Glen Rovers	4-09	21	5	4.20
5	Colman Murphy	Carbery	1-19	22	3	7.33
6	Alan Browne	Blackrock	2-14	20	4	5.00
7	Seánie McGrath	Glen Rovers	1-14	17	5	3.40
8	Barry Egan	Seandún	0-16	16	3	5.33
9	Kevin Murray	Muskerry	2-09	15	2	7.50
9	Adrian Coughlan	Blackrock	0-15	15	4	3.75

In a single game

Rank	Player	Club	Tally	Total	Opposition
1	Johnny Enright	UCC	1-12	15	Bishopstown
2	Brian Cunningham	St. Finbarr's	2-05	11	Carbery
2	Kevin Murray	Muskerry	2-05	11	St. Finbarr's
2	Johnny Enright	UCC	1-08	11	Na Piarsaigh
3	Neil Ronan	Ballyhea	1-07	10	St. Catherine's
3	Finbarr Kelly	Muskerry	1-07	10	Midleton
3	Eoin Fitzgerald	Imokilly	1-07	10	St. Finbarr's
4	Conor O'Riordan	Glen Rovers	1-06	9	Sarsfields
4	Seánie McGrath	Glen Rovers	1-06	9	Sarsfields
4	Brian Cunningham	St. Finbarr's	0-09	9	Muskerry
4	Barry Egan	Seandún	0-09	9	Kilbrittain

=== Miscellaneous ===
- It was the third year in-a-row that the championship title went to a divisional side.
- Imokilly become the first divisional team to qialify for three finals in a row. They also become the first divisional team to win back to back titles.
- Blackrock qualify for the final for first time sine 1986.
- Newtownshandrum return to the SHC for the first time since 1984.
