= 1992 Cork Senior Hurling Championship =

Annual hurling competition season

- Dates: 13 June – 11 October 1992
- Teams: 19
- Champions: Erin's Own (1st title); Frankie Horgan (captain); P. J. Murphy (manager)
- Runners-up: Na Piarsaigh; Paul O'Connor (captain); Éamonn Ryan (manager)

Tournament statistics
- Matches played: 22
- Goals scored: 57 (2.59 per match)
- Points scored: 500 (22.73 per match)
- Top scorer(s): Brian Corcoran (0-44)

The 1992 Cork Senior Hurling Championship was the 104th staging of the Cork Senior Hurling Championship since its establishment by the Cork County Board in 1887. The draw for the opening fixtures took place on 15 December 1991. The championship began on 13 June 1992 and ended on 11 October 1992.

Midleton entered the championship as the defending champions, however, they were defeated by Na Piarsaigh in the second round.

The final was played on 11 October 1992 at Páirc Uí Chaoimh in Cork between Erin's Own and Na Piarsaigh, in what was their first ever meeting in a final. Erin's Own won the match by 1–12 to 0–12 to claim their first ever championship title.

Brian Corcoran of Erin's Own was the championship's top scorer with 0-44.

== Team changes ==
=== To Championship ===
Promoted from the Cork Intermediate Hurling Championship

- Tracton

== Results ==
=== First round ===
14 June 1992 First round	Valley Rovers	1-10 - 1-10	Carrigdhoun	Minane Bridge
	C O'Donovan 1-1, J Shiels 0-4, P Murphy 0-2, D Kiely 0-2, M Cronin 0-1.		S McCarthy 1-3, D McCarthy 0-2, J Kennefick 0-2, P Ahern 0-1, A O'Driscoll 0-1, D Lombard 0-1.	Referee: J Motherway (Aghada)

14 June 1992 First round	Imokilly	2-18 - 3-07	Muskerry	Ballinhassig
	B Walsh 2-3, C Casey 0-4, C Clancy 0-3, P Cahill 0-2, T Hurley 0-2, D Walsh 0-1, R Lewis 0-1, R Dwane 0-1.		G Manley 3-6, T Barry-Murphy 0-1.	Referee: M O'Flaherty (Blackrock)

20 June 1992 First round	Seandún	0-11 - 0-12	Blackrock	Páirc Uí Chaoimh, Cork
	B Egan 0-9, M Lyons 0-1, C Coffey 0-1.		N O'Leary 0-7, E Kavanagh 0-2, D Dempsey 0-1, A Ryan 0-1, D Downey 0-1.	Referee: P Spillane (Carrigtwohill)

14 June 1992 First round replay	Valley Rovers	3-09 - 3-08	Carrigdhoun	Minane Bridge
	J Shiels 1-4, P Murphy 1-1, D Kiely 1-0, A Crowley 0-2, D O'Sullivan 0-1, E Burke 0-1.		A O'Driscoll 1-4, C Deasy 1-1, J Kennefick 1-0, S McCarthy 0-1, D McCarthy 0-1, J O'Mahony 0-1.	Referee: J Motherway (Aghada)

=== Second round ===
13 June 1992 Second round	Ballyhea	3-12 - 4-11	Carbery	Coachford
	P Ryan 1-3, M O'Callaghan 1-2, J O'Callaghan 0-4, I Ronan 1-0, T O'Donoghue 0-1, A Morrissey 0-1, E Morrissey 0-1.		P Crowley 1-1, M Foley 1-1, C Murphy 0-5, G O'Connell 1-0, D O'Connell 1-0, P Kenneally 0-2, T Crowley 0-2.

14 June 1992 Second round	Milford	2-14 - 2-13	Sarsfields	Páirc Mac Gearailt, Fermoy
	V Sheehan 1-5, S O'Gorman 0-4, J O'Gorman 1-0, N Fitzgibbon 0-1, P Buckley 0-1, S Stritch 0-1, G Fitzgibbon 0-1, G Sheehan 0-1.		D Walsh 0-9, P O'Callaghan 2-0, B Lotty 0-1, T Murphy 0-1, D Kenneally 0-1, P Smith 0-1.	Referee: W Horgan (Brian Dillons)

20 June 1992 Second round	Erin's Own	1-12 - 1-12	Glen Rovers	Páirc Uí Chaoimh, Cork
	B Corcoran 0-9, P Murphy 1-0, J Corcoran 0-1, B O'Neill 0-1, F Horgan 0-1.		P Horgan 0-5, G O'Riordan 1-1, K McGuckin 0-3, D Cooper 0-1, C McGuckin 0-1, J Fitzgibbon 0-1.	Referee: L O'Flynn (Éire Óg)

20 June 1992 Second round	St. Finbarr's	1-16 - 0-09	Duhallow
	B Cunningham 0-8, M Barry 1-1, I O'Mahony 0-3, B O'Shea 0-2, D Hurley 0-2.		T Burke 0-5, J Sheehan 0-2, J O'Mahony 0-1, M Doyle 0-1.	Referee: D Relihan (Castletownroche)

21 June 1992 Second round	Na Piarsaigh	1-12 - 0-03	Midleton	Páirc Uí Chaoimh, Cork
	T O'Sullivan 0-6, J O'Connor 0-4, Mick Mullins 1-0, Mark Mullins 0-1, M O'Sullivan 0-1.		G Fitzgerald 0-3.	Attendance: 5,156; Referee: W Horgan (Brian Dillons)

21 June 1992 Second round	Avondhu	0-06 - 2-11	University College Cork	Rathcormac
	R O'Connell 0-3, T Healy 0-1, M O'Brien 0-1, J Ryan 0-1.		J Ryan 1-1, D Quigley 1-1, D O'Mahony 0-4, M Salmon 0-2, V Murray 0-2, S O'Neill 0-1.

11 July 1992 Second round replay	Erin's Own	1-18 - 3-10	Glen Rovers	Páirc Uí Chaoimh, Cork
	B Corcoran 0-11, P Geasley 1-0, PJ Murphy 0-3, C O'Connell 0-1, G Bowen 0-1, F Horgan 0-1, B O'Neill 0-1.		C McGuckin 1-2, C Ring 1-1, B McGuckin 1-0, K McGuckin 0-3, T Mulcahy 0-2, D Cooper 0-2.	Referee: L O'Flynn (Éire Óg)

12 July 1992 Second round	Valley Rovers	0-14 - 0-14	Blackrock	Páirc Uí Chaoimh, Cork
	A Crowley 0-5, D Kiely 0-3, J Shiels 0-3, TJ Deasy 0-1, P Murphy 0-1, B O'Sullivan 0-1.		N Cahalane 0-3, N O'Leary 0-3, J Cashman 0-2, E Kavanagh 0-2, A Ryan 0-2, J Smith 0-1, A Browne 0-1.	Referee: L O'Flynn (Éire Óg)

12 July 1992 Second round	Imokilly	3-14 - 1-10	Tracton	Páirc Uí Chaoimh, Cork
	P Cahill 3-1, C Clancy 0-6, G Lewis 0-2, D O'Leary 0-2, G Scully 0-1, B Walsh 0-1, D Devoy 0-1.		DJ Kiely 1-2, K Kingston 0-3, B Long 0-3, P Murphy 0-2.	Referee: E Murphy

19 July 1992 Second round replay	Blackrock	1-15 - 3-07	Valley Rovers	Páirc Uí Chaoimh, Cork
	N O'Leary 0-6, N Cahalane 1-1, M Harrington 0-3, E Kavanagh 0-2, D Dempsey 0-1, A Ryan 0-1, J Murphy 0-1.		A Crowley 2-3, D Kiely 1-1, J Shiels 0-2, P Murphy 0-1.	Referee: L O'Flynn (Éire Óg)

=== Quarter-finals ===
19 July 1992 Quarter-final	Erin's Own	2-14 - 2-09	University College Cork	Páirc Uí Chaoimh, Cork
	B Corcoran 0-7, J Corcoran 1-1, G Bowen 1-0, PJ Murphy 0-2, P Geasley 0-2, F Horgan 0-1, J Leahy 0-1.		J Ryan 1-1, J Brenner 0-4, E Farrell 1-0, S O'Neill 0-2, D O'Mahony 0-2.	Referee: M Flaherty

19 July 1992 Quarter-final	Na Piarsaigh	2-13 - 0-05	Carbery	Innishannon
	T O'Sullivan 0-9, Mark Mullins 2-0, M O'Sullivan 0-3, P O'Connor 0-1.		C Murphy 0-3, D O'Neill 0-1, P Crowley 0-1.	Referee: G Harrington (Carrigaline)

26 July 1992 Quarter-final	Blackrock	1-18 - 1-10	Milford	Coachford
	N O'Leary 0-5, J Murphy 1-1, J Cashman 0-3, E Kavanagh 0-3, M Harrington 0-2, A Browne 0-2, A Ryan 0-1, N Cahalane 0-1.		S Stritch 1-1, V Sheehan 0-4, P Buckley 0-2, S O'Gorman 0-1, G Fitzgibbon 0-1, N Fitzgibbon 0-1.	Referee: W Horgan (Brian Dillons)

31 July 1992 Quarter-final	Imokilly	1-10 - 1-10	St. Finbarr's	Clonmult Memorial Park, Midleton
	C Clancy 0-4, G Lewis 1-0, B Walsh 0-2, D O'Leary 0-2, P Cahill 0-1, C Carey 0-1.		M Barry 1-1, B Cunningham 0-3, Christy Ryan 0-2, B O'Shea 0-2, Conor Ryan 0-1, Kieran Murphy 0-1.	Referee: L O'Flynn (Éire Óg)

19 September 1992 Quarter-final replay	Imokilly	1-11 - 0-10	St. Finbarr's	Clonmult Memorial Park, Midleton
	C Clancy 1-5, P Cahill 0-4, B Walsh 0-2.		B Cunningham 0-8, F Lehane 0-2.	Referee: L O'Flynn (Éire Óg)

=== Semi-finals ===
19 September 1992 Semi-final	Na Piarsaigh	1-14 - 1-06	Blackrock	Páirc Uí Chaoimh, Cork
	Mark Mullins 1-3, T O'Sullivan 0-4, J O'Connor 0-2, C O'Donovan 0-2, M O'Sullivan 0-2, Mick Mullins 0-1.		N O'Leary 0-4, N Cahalane 1-0, D Dempsey 0-1, J Murphy 0-1.	Referee: J Motherway (Aghada)

27 September 1992 Semi-final	Erin's Own	0-17 - 1-11	Imokilly	Páirc Uí Chaoimh, Cork
	B Corcoran 0-7, P Geasley 0-3, J Corcoran 0-3, F Horgan 0-2, PJ Murphy 0-1, C O'Connell 0-1.		C Clancy 1-4, B Walsh 0-3, C Casey 0-2, D O'Leary 0-1, P Cahill 0-1.	Referee: G Harrington (Carrigaline)

=== Final ===
11 October 1992 Final	Erin's Own	1-12 - 0-12	Na Piarsaigh	Páirc Uí Chaoimh, Cork
	B Corcoran 0-10, B O'Neill 1-0, J Corcoran 0-1, J Dillon 0-1.		T O'Sullivan 0-6, J O'Connor 0-2, Mark Mullins 0-1, G Maguire 0-1, P O'Connor 0-1, Mick Mullins 0-1.	Attendance: 18,000; Referee: W Horgan (Brian Dillons)

== Championship statistics ==
=== Top scorers ===
Overall

Rank	Player	Club	Tally	Total	Matches	Average
1	Brian Corcoran	Erin's Own	0-44	44	5	8.80
2	Christy Clancy	Imokilly	2-22	28	5	5.60
3	Noel O'Leary	Blackrock	0-25	25	5	5.00
3	Tony O'Sullivan	Na Piarsaigh	0-25	25	4	6.25
5	Brian Cunningham	St. Finbarr's	0-19	19	3	6.33
6	Philip Cahill	Imokilly	3-09	18	5	3.60
7	Brendan Walsh	Imokilly	2-11	17	5	3.40
8	Aidan Crowley	Valley Rovers	2-10	16	4	4.00
8	John Shiels	Valley Rovers	1-13	16	4	4.00
10	Ger Manley	Muskerry	3-06	15	1	15.00

In a single game

Rank	Player	Club	Tally	Total	Opposition
1	Ger Manley	Muskerry	3-06	15	Imokilly
2	Brian Corcoran	Erin's Own	0-11	11	Glen Rovers
3	Philip Cahill	Imokilly	3-01	10	Tracton
3	Brian Corcoran	Erin's Own	0-10	10	Na Piarsaigh
5	Aidan Crowley	Valley Rovers	2-03	9	Blackrock
5	Brendan Walsh	Imokilly	2-03	9	Muskerry
5	Brian Corcoran	Erin's Own	0-09	9	Glen Rovers
5	Tony O'Sullivan	Na Piarsaigh	0-09	9	Carbery
5	Dave Walsh	Sarsfields	0-09	9	Milford
5	Barry Egan	Seandún	0-09	9	Blackrock

=== Miscellaneous ===
- Erin's Own win their first title in their first appearance in the final.
