= 1988 Cork Senior Hurling Championship =

Annual hurling competition season

- Dates: 1 May – 16 October 1988
- Teams: 17
- Champions: St. Finbarr's (24th title); Ger Cunningham (captain); Con Roche (manager)
- Runners-up: Glen Rovers; Tomás Mulcahy (captain); Donie O'Donovan (manager)

Tournament statistics
- Matches played: 17
- Goals scored: 65 (3.82 per match)
- Points scored: 385 (22.65 per match)
- Top scorer(s): Brian Cunningham (2-29)

The 1988 Cork Senior Hurling Championship was the 100th staging of the Cork Senior Hurling Championship since its establishment by the Cork County Board in 1887. The championship began on 1 May 1988 and ended on 16 October 1988.

Midleton entered the championship as the defending champions, however, they were defeated by Blackrock in the second round.

The final was played on 16 October 1988 at Páirc Uí Chaoimh in Cork, between St. Finbarr's and Glen Rovers, in what was their first meeting in the final in seven years. St. Finbarr's won the match by 3–18 to 2–14 to claim their 24th championship title overall and a first title in four years.

Brian Cunningham was the championship's top scorer with 2-29.

== Team changes ==
=== To Championship ===
Promoted from the Cork Intermediate Hurling Championship

- Erin's Own

== Results ==
=== First round ===
1 May 1988 First round	Blackrock	4-08 – 1-06	Ballyhea	Páirc Mac Gearailt, Fermoy
	P Deasy 2-0, O Kavanagh 1-1, F Delaney 0-4, P Maher 1-0, M Kilcoyne 0-1, E O'Donoghue 0-1, T Cashman 0-1.		A Morrissey 1-0, M O'Callaghan 0-3, D Ryan 0-2, J O'Callaghan 0-1.	Referee: J O'Leary (Na Piarsaigh)

=== Second round ===
14 May 1988 Round 2	Na Piarsaigh	2-20 – 1-09	Carbery	Cloughduv
	Mick Mullins 1-5, J Twomey 1-2, T O'Sullivan 0-3, J O'Sullivan 0-3, C Connery 0-2, D Murphy 0-2, L Forde 0-2, R McDonnell 0-2.		M Foley 1-3, P Crowley 0-2, P Harte 0-2, T Brennan 0-1, D Collins 0-1.	Referee: M Keane

15 May 1988 Round 2	Midleton	0-12 – 2-10	Blackrock	Páirc Uí Chaoimh, Cork
	J Fenton 0-7, J Hartnett 0-1, K Hennessy 0-1, G Fitzgerald 0-1, J Boylan 0-1, G Glavin 0-1.		F Delaney 2-4, O Kavanagh 0-3, T Cashman 0-1, E O'Donoghue 0-1, J Cashman 0-1.	Referee: W Horagn (Brian Dillons)

15 May 1988 Round 2	St. Finbarr’s	2-17 – 0-10	Muskerry	Charlie Hurley Park, Bandon
	M Barry 1-4, F O'Brien 1-2, J Cremin 0-5, J Griffin 0-4, T Finn 0-2.		G Manley 0-6, T Ó Murchú 0-2, D O'Driscoll 0-1, M O'Donoghue 0-1.	Referee: J O'Leary (Na Piarsaigh)

15 May 1988 Round 2	Glen Rovers	2-12 – 1-08	Imokilly	Páirc Uí Chaoimh, Cork
	J Fitzgibbon 1-2, C Ring 0-4, T Mulcahy 1-0, J Buckley 0-2, P Horgan 0-2, T Harte 0-1, K McGuckin 0-1.		G Lewis 1-0, P Cahill 0-3, G Lee 0-2, C Casey 0-2, P Kidney 0-1.	Referee: R Murphy

15 May 1988 Round 2	Avondhu	4-09 – 2-06	Seandún	Ballinlough
	M Carroll 2-0, R Sheehan 0-5, D Relihan 1-1, PJ Stokes 1-0, D Coughlan 0-2, J Keane 0-1.		C Coffey 0-4, G McCarthy 1-0, L Twohig 1-0, A O'Sullivan 0-2.	Referee: P Spillane (Carrigtwohill)

15 May 1988 Round 2	Milford	1-18 – 1-12	Erin’s Own	Castletownroche
	S Stritch 1-5, P Madigan 0-4, M Fitzgibbon 0-3, S O'Gorman 0-2, V Sheehan 0-1, G Fitzgibbon 0-1, N Fitzgibbon 0-1, J Fitzgibbon 0-1.		M Bowen 0-6, J Dillon 1-1, R O'Connor 0-2, PJ Murphy 0-2, J Bowen 0-1.	Referee: P Cronin (St. Finbarr's)

15 May 1988 Round 2	Carrigdhoun	0-17 – 2-04	Cloughduv	Charlie Hurley Park, Bandon
	S McCarthy 0-7, L Kelly 0-4, J Kennefick 0-3, D McCarthy 0-2, K Kingston 0-1.		D O'Leary 2-2, B McSweeney 0-1, D Lynch 0-1.

22 May 1988 Round 2	Sarsfields	6-10 – 3-11	Duhallow	Castletownroche
	T McCarthy 2-2, S Considine 1-1, T McAuliffe 1-0, B Lotty 1-0, T Murphy 1-0, D Kenneally 0-3, B Óg Murphy 0-2, J Ryan 0-1, P Smith 0-1.		T Burke 2-7, F Keane 1-1, D Sheahn 0-3.	Referee: M Flaherty (Blackrock)

=== Quarter-finals ===
12 June 1988 Quarter-final	Blackrock	3-19 – 0-09	Sarsfields	Páirc Uí Chaoimh, Cork
	E O'Donoghue 2-5, O Kavanagh 1-3, F Delaney 0-5, T Cashman 0-2, F Collins 0-2, M Kilcoyne 0-1, P Deasy 0-1.		D Kenneally 0-6, T McCarthy 0-2, T McAuliffe 0-1.	Referee: W Horgan (Brian Dillons)

26 June 1988 Quarter-final	Na Piarsaigh	1-13 – 1-07	Carrigdhoun	Páirc Uí Chaoimh, Cork
	Mick Mullins 1-6, T O'Sullivan 0-3, R McDonnell 0-2, J O'Sullivan 0-1, J Twomey 0-1.		K Kingston 1-5, M Fitzpatrick 0-1, J O'Mahony 0-1.	Referee: P Spillane (Carrigtwohill)

26 June 1988 Quarter-final	St. Finbarr's	3-12 – 3-10	Milford	Fr. Con Buckley Park, Buttevant
	B Cunningham 1-3, J Cremin 1-3, G Cunningham 1-0, J Griffin 0-3, T Finn 0-2, J Tobin 0-1.		G Fitzgibbon 1-2, S O'Gorman 1-2, S Stritch 1-1, P Madigan 0-3, N Fitzgibbon 0-1, V Sheehan 0-1.	Referee: F Murphy (Blackrock)

2 July 1988 Quarter-final	Glen Rovers	4-11 – 2-09	Avondhu	Clonmult Memorial Park, Midleton
	T Mulcahy 2-2, P Horgan 1-1, J O'Leary 1-0, G O'Riordan 0-3, C Ring 0-2, K McGuckin 0-2, J Fitzgibbon 0-1.		Dan Relihan 2-0, R Sheehan 0-4, T O'Callaghan 0-2, M Carroll 0-1, D Murphy 0-1, Dave Relihan 0-1.	Referee: J Motherway (Aghada)

=== Semi-finals ===
19 August 1988 Semi-final	Blackrock	2-15 – 3-12	St. Finbarr’s	Páirc Uí Chaoimh, Cork
	F Delaney 1-7, T Cashman 0-4, N Cahalane 1-0, E O'Donoghue 0-2, E Kavanagh 0-1, F Collins 0-1.		B Cunningham 1-10, T Finn 1-1, M Barry 1-0, J Cremin 0-1.	Referee: W Horgan (Brian Dillons)

20 August 1988 Semi-final	Glen Rovers	1-13 – 1-11	Na Piarsaigh	Páirc Uí Chaoimh, Cork
	P Horgan 0-5, J Fitzgibbon 1-1, G O'Riordan 0-3, K Keane 0-1, J Buckley 0-1, D Cooper 0-1, T Mulcahy 0-1.		A Goulding 1-0, L Forde 0-3, Mick Mullins 0-2, J O'Sullivan 0-2, T O'Sullivan 0-2, R McDonnell 0-1, J O'Meara 0-1.	Referee: F Murphy (Blackrock)

25 September 1988 Semi-final replay	Blackrock	0-07 – 2-06	St. Finbarr’s	Páirc Uí Chaoimh, Cork
	F Delaney 0-5, E O'Donoghue 0-1, F Collins 0-1.		B Cunningham 0-4, C Ryan 1-0, M Barry 1-0, E Fitzpatrick 0-1, T Finn 0-1.

=== Final ===
16 October 1988 Final	St. Finbarr's	3-18 – 2-14	Glen Rovers	Páirc Uí Chaoimh, Cork
15:30	B Cunningham 0-12, E Fitzpatrick 2-0, T Finn 1-2, C Ryan 0-3, J Cremin 0-1.		G O'Riordan 1-6, P Horgan 1-4, J Fitzgibbon 0-1, T Mulcahy 0-1, J Buckley 0-1, D Cooper 0-1.	Attendance: 20,120; Referee: F Murphy (Blackrock)

== Championship statistics ==
=== Top scorers ===
Overall

Rank	Player	Club	Tally	Total	Matches	Average
1	Brian Cunningham	St. Finbarr's	2-29	35	4	8.75
2	Finbarr Delaney	Blackrock	3-25	34	5	6.80
3	Mick Mullins	Na Piarsaigh	2-13	19	3	6.33
4	Pat Horgan	Glen Rovers	2-12	18	4	4.50
5	Éamonn O'Donoghue	Blackrock	2-10	16	5	3.20
6	Ger O'Riordan	Glen Rovers	1-12	15	3	5.00
7	Tim Finn	St. Finbarr's	2-08	14	5	2.80
7	Eoin Kavanagh	Blackrock	2-08	14	5	2.80
9	Mick Barry	St. Finbarr's	3-04	13	5	2.60
9	Tomás Mulcahy	Glen Rovers	3-04	13	4	3.25
9	Tim Burke	Duhallow	2-07	13	1	13.00

In a single game

Rank	Player	Club	Tally	Total	Opposition
1	Tim Burke	Duhallow	2-07	13	Sarsfields
1	Brian Cunningham	St. Finbarr's	1-10	13	Blackrock
3	Brian Cunningham	St. Finbarr's	0-12	12	Blackrock
4	Éamonn O'Donoghue	Blackrock	2-05	11	Sarsfields
5	Finbarr Delaney	Blackrock	2-04	10	Midleton
5	Finbarr Delaney	Blackrock	1-07	10	St. Finbarr's
7	Ger O'Riordan	Glen Rovers	1-06	9	St. Finbarr's
7	Mick Mullins	Na Piarsaigh	1-06	9	Carrigdhoun
9	Donald O'Leary	Cloughduv	2-02	8	Carrigdhoun
9	Teddy McCarthy	Sarsfields	2-02	8	Duhallow
9	Tomás Mulcahy	Glen Rovers	2-02	8	Avondhu
9	Mick Mullins	Na Piarsaigh	1-05	8	Carbery
9	Séamus Stritch	Milford	1-05	8	Erin's Own
9	Kieran Kingston	Carrigdhoun	1-05	8	Na Piarsaigh
