= 1997 Cork Senior Hurling Championship =

Annual hurling competition season

- Dates: 25 May 1997 – 5 October 1997
- Teams: 21
- Sponsor: TSB Bank
- Champions: Imokilly (1st title); Brian O'Driscoll (captain); Seánie O'Leary (manager)
- Runners-up: Sarsfields; Pat Smith (captain); Tadhg Murphy (manager)

Tournament statistics
- Matches played: 22
- Goals scored: 69 (3.14 per match)
- Points scored: 556 (25.27 per match)
- Top scorer(s): Pat Ryan (1-47)

The 1997 Cork Senior Hurling Championship was the 109th staging of the Cork Senior Hurling Championship since its establishment by the Cork County Board in 1887. The draw for the opening fixtures took place on 8 December 1996. The championship ended on 5 October 1997.

Avondhu entered the championship as the defending champions, however, they were defeated by Sarsfields at the quarter-final stage.

On 5 October 1997, Imokilly won the championship following a 1–18 to 2–12 defeat of Sarsfields in the final. This was their first championship title.

Sarsfields' Pat Ryan was the championship's top scorer with 1-47.

== Team changes ==
=== To Championship ===
Promoted from the Cork Intermediate Hurling Championship

- Newtownshandrum

=== From Championship ===
Regraded to the Cork Intermediate Hurling Championship

- Milford
- Youghal

== Results ==
First round

14 June 1997 First round	Muskerry	2-08 - 0-11	Bishopstown	Páirc Uí Rinn, Cork
	C Hennessy 1-1, K Murray 1-0, B Sheehan 0-3, J O'Dwyer 0-2, S Holland 0-1, A Beale 0-1.		D O'Mahony 0-4, J Murphy 0-2, A O'Sullivan 0-2, L Meaney 0-1, M Hayes 0-1, M Cogan 0-1.	Referee: K Healy (Ballymartle)

15 June 1997 First round	University College Cork	3-16 - 0-09	Carrigdhoun	Páirc Uí Rinn, Cork
	J Enright 1-5, J Deane 0-7, E O'Neill 1-1, J Murphy 1-1, E Enright 0-2.		S McCarthy 0-7, J O'Mahony 0-1, J Mullaney 0-1.	Referee: P Spillane (Carrigtwohill)

15 June 1997 First round	Carbery	1-13 - 2-13	St. Catherine's	Páirc Uí Chaoimh, Cork
	C Murphy 0-7, M Walsh 1-1, J Forrestal 0-3, J Collins 0-1, D Twohig 0-1.		C Clancy 0-6, D O'Leary 1-2, B Cotter 1-1, K Morrison 0-1, M Hegarty 0-1, J Sheehan 0-1, S Kearney 0-1.	Referee: D O'Leary (Cloughduv)

21 June 1997 First round	Midleton	2-09 - 4-18	Blackrock	Páirc Uí Chaoimh, Cork
	L Walsh 1-2, D Quirke 1-1, G Manley 0-3, P Smith 0-2.		A Browne 2-5, J O'Flynn 1-2, C O'Flaherty 1-2, A Cummins 0-3, B Hennebrey 0-3, B O'Keeffe 0-2, J Smith 0-1.	Referee: L O'Flynn (Éire Óg)

28 June 1997 First round	Kilbrittain	2-12 - 1-11	Newtownshandrum	Páirc Uí Chaoimh, Cork
	D O'Connell 1-2, F O'Mahony 1-0, N Crowley 0-3, J O'Brien 0-2, V O'Brien 0-2, P Sexton 0-2, G O'Connell 0-1.		B O'Connor 1-2, M Morrissey 0-2, J O'Connor 0-2, P Noonan 0-1, D Mulcahy 0-1, B Troy 0-1, R Troy 0-1, P Mulcahy 0-1.	Referee: J O'Leary

Second round

25 May 1997 Second round	Duhallow	1-10 - 3-13	Ballyhea	Milford
	C Buckley 0-7, T Burke 1-1, K McCarthy 0-1, G Angland 0-1.		N Ronan 1-7, D Ronan 1-3, M O'Callaghan 1-0, D O'Riordan 0-1, I Ronan 0-1, J Mortell 0-1.	Referee: L O'Flynn (Éire Óg)

14 June 1997 Second round	St. Finbarr's	1-14 - 3-07	Na Piarsaigh	Páirc Uí Chaoimh, Cork
	P Forde 1-5, K Kelleher 0-4, B O'Shea 0-3, E Fitzpatrick 0-1, F Lehane 0-1.		C Connery 1-2, G Daly 1-1, D O'Sullivan 1-0, Mark Mullins 0-2, T O'Sullivan 0-1, L Forde 0-1.	Referee: J Motherway (Aghada)

15 June 1997 Second round	Cork Regional Technical College	1-02 - 3-23	Imokilly	Clonmult Memorial Park, Midleton
	F Kelly 1-1, V Cooney 0-1.		P Cahill 2-3, J Smiddy 0-7, M Daly 0-5, E Canavan 1-1, R Dwane 0-4, T McCarthy 0-1, D O'Sullivan 0-1, R Meaney 0-1.	Referee: G Harrington (Carrigaline)

6 July 1997 Second round	Sarsfields	3-10 - 1-16	Seandún	Clonmult Memorial Park, Midleton
	P Ryan 0-7, G Murphy 1-1, J Murphy 1-0, P Gahan 1-0, T McCarthy 0-1, J Barry 0-1.		G Healy 0-5, G O'Connor 1-0, B Egan 0-4, B Couttes 0-2, M McElhinney 0-2, J O'Driscoll 0-1, D Quinlan 0-1, D O'Callaghan 0-1.	Referee: J O'Leary

12 July 1997 Second round	Glen Rovers	4-05 - 2-13	Blackrock	Páirc Uí Chaoimh, Cork
	R Kelleher 2-0, S McGrath 1-1, R Kelleher 1-0, J Anderson 0-1, T Mulcahy 0-1, G Riordan 0-1, C Riordan 0-1.		C O'Flaherty 1-3, B O'Keeffe 1-1, A Browne 0-3, J Cashman 0-3, A Coughlan 0-2, A Cummins 0-1.	Referee: L O'Flynn (Éire Óg)

13 July 1997 Second round	Avondhu	2-16 - 3-11	St. Catherine's	Watergrasshill
	R O'Connell 0-6, B O'Driscoll 1-2, S Killeen 1-0, R Geary 0-3, F McCormack 0-3, R Sheehan 0-2.		C Clancy 1-6, K Morrisson 1-1, C Casey 1-1, B Cotter 0-2, D O'Leary 0-1.	Referee: J O'Leary (Na Piarsaigh)

20 July 1997 Second round	Kilbrittain	1-14 - 0-18	University College Cork	Jack Barrett Park, Kinsale
	D O'Connell 0-5, P Sexton 0-4, N Crowley 1-0, T Brennan 0-2, E Sheehy 0-1, G O'Connell 0-1, D McSweeney 0-1.		D Bennett 0-10, D McGrath 0-3, J Murphy 0-1, E Enright 0-1, J O'Brien 0-1, E O'Neill 0-1, R Woods 0-1.	Referee: P O'Neill (Shamrocks)

27 July 1997 Second round	Erin's Own	3-13 - 1-10	Muskerry	Páirc Uí Rinn, Cork
	S Dunne 1-2, J Corcoran 0-4, T O'Keeffe 1-0, P Kelly 1-0, B Corcoran 0-3, J Dillon 0-3, T Kelleher 0-1.		S Holland 1-1, C Conway 0-4, K Murray 0-3, J Miskella 0-1, T O'Mahony 0-1.	Referee: W Horgan (Brian Dillons)

2 August 1997 Second round replay	Sarsfields	3-21 - 3-21 (aet)	Seandún	Clonmult Memorial Park, Midleton
	P Ryan 0-14, J Murphy 2-3, N Ahern 1-1, J Considine 0-1, T Óg Murphy 0-1, T McCarthy 0-1.		M McElhinney 1-3, D Quinlan 0-6, B Egan 0-5, D McElhinney 1-1, J Horgan 1-0, G Healy 0-3, P Finnegan 0-2, D O'Callaghan 0-1.	Referee: L O'Flynn (Éire Óg)

10 August 1997 Second round second replay	Sarsfields	3-11 - 2-12	Seandún	Clonmult Memorial Park, Midleton
	N Ahern 2-1, P Ryan 0-6, J Murphy 1-0, P O'Callaghan 0-3, T Óg Lynch 0-1.		B Egan 0-5, D Quinlan 1-1, M McElhinney 1-0, J Horgan 0-2, T O'Donovan 0-1, C Hartnett 0-1.	Referee: D O'Leary

Quarter-finals

2 August 1997 Quarter-final	Imokilly	2-20 - 0-13	University College Cork	Caherlag Sportsfield, Glounthaune
	S O'Farrell 1-3, E Canavan 0-6, P Cahill 1-2, B Coleman 0-4, D Barrett 0-2, R Dwane 0-2, M Landers 0-1.		D Bennett 0-9, J Enright 0-2, J O'Brien 0-2.	Referee: W Horgan (Brian Dillons)

3 August 1997 Quarter-final	St. Finbarr's	0-11 - 0-05	Ballyhea	Carrowkeel Sportsfield, Mallow
	B Cunningham 0-5, P Forde 0-3, E Fitzpatrick 0-1, K Kelleher 0-1, P McSweeney 0-1,		A Morrissey 0-2, D Ronan 0-2, E Morrissey 0-1.	Referee: G Harrington (Carrigaline)

9 August 1997 Quarter-final	Blackrock	1-14 - 0-11	Erin's Own	Páirc Uí Chaoimh, Cork
	A Cummins 0-5, B O'Keeffe 1-1, B Hennebrey 0-4, J Cashman 0-2, C O'Flaherty 0-1, A Browne 0-1.		J Corcoran 0-7, B Corcoran 0-1, P Kelly 0-1, K Murphy 0-1, T O'Keeffe 0-1.	Referee: L O'Flynn

16 August 1997 Quarter-final	Sarsfields	1-15 - 2-09	Avondhu	Páirc Uí Chaoimh, Cork
	P Ryan 0-9, J Barry 1-1, C McCarthy 0-1, J Murphy 0-1, T Óg Lynch 0-1, B O'Callaghan 0-1, N Ahern 0-1.		R O'Connell 1-4, R Sheehan 1-0, F McCormack 0-1, J Hayes 0-1, D Moher 0-1, B O'Driscoll 0-1, R Geary 0-1.	Referee: L O'Flynn

Semi-finals

24 August 1997 Semi-final	Imokilly	0-17 - 1-09	St. Finbarr's	Páirc Uí Chaoimh, Cork
	J Smiddy 0-8, P Cahill 0-5, M Daly 0-2, D Barrett 0-1, S O'Farrell 0-1.		B Cunningham 0-7, M Ryan 1-1, A O'Regan 0-1.	Referee: W Horgan (Brian Dillons)

30 August 1997 Semi-final	Sarsfields	1-10 - 0-12	Blackrock	Páirc Uí Chaoimh, Cork
	P Ryan 0-4, G Ryan 1-0, B O'Callaghan 0-2, J Murphy 0-2, C McCarthy 0-1, N Ahern 0-1.		J O'Flynn 0-3, J Cashman 0-3, A Coughlan 0-2, A Cummins 0-2, C O'Flaherty 0-1, A Browne 0-1.	Referee: J O'Leary

Final

5 October 1997 Final	Imokilly	1-18 - 2-12	Sarsfields	Páirc Uí Chaoimh, Cork
	J Smiddy 0-7, T McCarthy 1-2, M Daly 0-2, P Cahill 0-2, S O'Farrell 0-2, M Landers 0-1, D Barrett 0-1, M Downing 0-1.		P Ryan 1-7, C O'Leary 1-0, B O'Callaghan 0-3, J Murphy 0-1, N Aherne 0-1.	Attendance: 15,000; Referee: G Harrington

== Championship statistics ==
=== Top scorers ===
Overall

Rank	Player	Club	Tally	Total	Matches	Average
1	Pat Ryan	Sarsfields	1-47	50	6	6.33
2	Jimmy Smiddy	Imokilly	0-22	22	4	5.50
3	Philip Cahill	Imokilly	3-12	21	4	5.25
4	John Murphy	Sarsfields	4-07	19	6	3.16
4	Dave Bennett	UCC	0-19	19	2	9.50
5	Alan Browne	Blackrock	2-10	16	4	4.00
6	Christy Clancy	St. Catherine's	1-12	15	2	7.50
7	Niall Ahern	Sarsfields	3-05	14	6	2.33
7	Barry Egan	Seandún	0-14	14	3	4.66
8	Colm O'Flaherty	Blackrock	2-07	13	4	3.25
8	Ray O'Connell	Avondhu	1-10	13	2	6.50

In a single game

Rank	Player	Club	Tally	Total	Opposition
1	Pat Ryan	Sarsfields	0-14	14	Seandún
2	Alan Browne	Blackrock	2-05	11	Midleton
3	Neil Ronan	Ballyhea	1-07	10	Duhallow
3	Pat Ryan	Sarsfields	1-07	10	Imokilly
3	Dave Bennett	UCC	0-10	10	Kilbrittain
4	Philip Cahill	Imokilly	2-03	9	Cork RTC
4	John Murphy	Sarsfields	2-03	9	Seandún
4	Christy Clancy	St. Catherine's	1-06	9	Avondhu
4	Dave Bennett	UCC	0-09	9	Imokilly
4	Pat Ryan	Sarsfields	0-09	9	Avondhu

=== Miscellaneous ===
- Imokilly win their first title.
- Sarsfeilds qualify for the final for the first time since 1989.
