= Jimmy Smiddy =

Irish hurler

Personal information
- Native name: Séamus Smidí (Irish)
- Born: 1974 (age 51–52) Castlemartyr, County Cork, Ireland
- Occupation: Garda Síochána

Sport
- Sport: Hurling
- Position: Right corner-forward
Clubs
Years	Club	Apps (scores)
1991-2015 1993-2005	Castlemartyr → Imokilly	28 (5-94)
Club titles
- Cork titles: 2
College
- Years: College
- Garda College
College titles
- Fitzgibbon titles: 0
Inter-county
Years	County	Apps (scores)
1996	Cork	0 (0-00)
Inter-county titles
- Munster titles: 0
- All-Irelands: 0
- NHL: 0
- All Stars: 0

James Smiddy (born 1974) is an Irish former hurler. At club level he played with Castlemartyr and divisional side Imokilly and at inter-county level was a member of the Cork senior hurling team. Smiddy usually lined out as a forward.

== Career ==
Smiddy first played hurling and Gaelic football at juvenile and underage levels with the Castlemartyr club. He also played in various competitions as a schoolboy with Midleton CBS, including the Harty Cup. Smiddy spent 25 years as a player at adult level with Castlemartyr and won several divisional titles as a dual player before winning a Cork JAHC title in 2014. He also earned selection with the Imokilly divisional team and won consecutive Cork SHC titles in 1997 and 1998.

Smiddy first appeared on the inter-county scene as a dual player at minor level. After winning a Munster MFC title, he later won a Munster U21HC title while also lining out with the under-21 football team. Smiddy was part of the Cork junior hurling team that won the Munster JHC title in 1996, the same year he made a number of appearances for the Cork senior hurling team in various tournament and pre-season games. He was part of the Cork intermediate hurling team that beat Galway in the 1997 All-Ireland intermediate final.

== Honours ==
Castlemarty

- Cork Junior A Hurling Championship: 2014
- East Cork Junior A Football Championship: 1991
- East Cork Junior A Hurling Championship: 2009, 2010, 2013, 2014

Imokilly

- Cork Senior Hurling Championship: 1997, 1998

Cork

- All-Ireland Intermediate Hurling Championship: 1997
- Munster Intermediate Hurling Championship: 1997
- Munster Junior Hurling Championship: 1996
- Munster Under-21 Hurling Championship: 1996
- Munster Minor Football Championship: 1992
