= Pádraig Crowley =

Irish hurler

Personal information
- Native name: Pádraig Ó Crualaíoch (Irish)
- Born: 1957 (age 68–69) Bandon, County Cork, Ireland

Sport
- Sport: Hurling
- Position: Left wing-forward
Clubs
Years	Club	Apps (scores)
1975-1997 1981-1995	Bandon → Carbery	19 (7-74); 31 (9-108)
Club titles
- Cork titles: 1
Inter-county*
Years	County	Apps (scores)
1980-1983	Cork	2 (0-00)
Inter-county titles
- Munster titles: 2
- All-Irelands: 0
- NHL: 1
- All Stars: 0
- *Inter County team apps and scores correct as of 19:23, 21 March 2021.

Pádraig Crowley (born 1957) is an Irish retired hurler who played for club side Bandon, divisional side Carbery and was a member of the Cork senior hurling team from 1980 until 1984.

== Career ==
Born in Bandon, Crowley first came to prominence on the inter-county scene on the Cork minor team that lost to Kilkenny in the 1975 All-Ireland final. Munster Championship success followed with the under-21 team before a spell with the Cork senior team yielded a National League medal and back-to-back Munster Championship titles. Crowley enjoyed a 23-season club career with Bandon, however, it was with divisional side Carbery that he enjoyed his greatest club success when the division claimed the 1994 County Championship.

== Honours ==
Bandon

- South West Junior A Hurling Championship: 1990, 1995

Carbery

- Cork Senior Hurling Championship: 1994

Cork

- Munster Senior Hurling Championship: 1982, 1983
- National Hurling League: 1980-81
- Munster Under-21 Hurling Championship: 1977
- Munster Minor Hurling Championship: 1975
