= Niall Ahern =

Irish hurler

Personal information
- Native name: Niall Ó hEathírn (Irish)
- Born: 1968 (age 57–58) Glanmire, County Cork, Ireland
- Occupation: Secondary school principal

Sport
- Sport: Hurling
- Position: Full-forward
Club
Years	Club	Apps (scores)
1989-1997	Sarsfields	22 (19-61)
Club titles
- Cork titles: 0
College
- Years: College
- 1986-1991: University College Cork
College titles
- Fitzgibbon titles: 2
Inter-county
Years	County	Apps (scores)
1989-1990	Cork	0 (0-00)
Inter-county titles
- Munster titles: 0
- All-Irelands: 0
- NHL: 0
- All Stars: 0

Niall Ahern (born 1968) is an Irish former hurler. At club level he played with Sarsfields and at inter-county level was a member of the Cork senior hurling team. Ahern usually lined out as a forward.

== Career ==
Ahern first played hurling and Gaelic football at juvenile and underage levels with the Sarsfields and Glanmire clubs. He simultaneously lined out as a schoolboy with Coláiste an Chroí Naofa in Carrignavar and won an All-Ireland Colleges medal in 1985. He subsequently won Fitzgibbon Cup titles as a student with University College Cork. After being part of the Glanmire team that won the 1987 Cork IFC title, Ahern was on the Sarsfields senior team that lost county finals to Glen Rovers in 1989 and Imokilly in 1997. Ahern first appeared on the inter-county scene as a member of the Cork under-21 hurling team in 1989. He was later drafted onto the senior team during the 1989-90 NHL.

== Career statistics ==
Team	Year	National League			Munster		All-Ireland		Total	
Team	Year	Division	Apps	Score	Apps	Score	Apps	Score	Apps	Score
Cork	1989-90	Division 1A	1	0-00	—		—		1	0-00
Career total			1	0-00	—		—		1	0-00

== Honours ==
Coláiste an Chroí Naofa

- All-Ireland Colleges Senior B Football Championship: 1985
- Munster Colleges Senior B Football Championship: 1985

University College Cork

- Fitzgibbon Cup: 1990, 1991
- All-Ireland Freshers' Hurling Championship: 1987

Glanmire

- Cork Intermediate Football Championship: 1987
