= Brian Cunningham (hurler) =

Irish retired hurler

Personal information
- Native name: Brian Mac Cuinneagáin (Irish)
- Born: 1970 (age 55–56) Togher, Cork, Ireland

Sport
- Sport: Hurling
- Position: Full Forward
Club
Years	Club	Apps (scores)
1988-2003	St Finbarr's	49 (19-247)
Club titles
- Cork titles: 2
College
- Years: College
- 1987-1991: University College Cork
College titles
- Fitzgibbon titles: 3
Inter-county*
Years	County	Apps (scores)
1988-1993	Cork	1 (0-00)
Inter-county titles
- Munster titles: 0
- All-Irelands: 0
- NHL: 0
- All Stars: 0
- *Inter County team apps and scores correct as of 00:07, 29 June 2018.

Brian Cunningham (born 1970) is an Irish former hurler. Most notable as a member of the full-forward line, he was a member at senior level of the Cork county team at various times from 1988 until 1993.

== Career ==
Born in Togher, Cunningham was educated at Coláiste Iognáid Rís, representing the school in the Harty Cup. He later attended University College Cork, with whom he won three Fitzgibbon Cup medals.

One of the top club scorers of his generation, Cunningham was a member of the St Finbarr's club. After joining the club's senior team in 1988, he won his first championship medal in his debut season as well as finishing the year as the championship's top scorer and man of the match in the final. Cunningham was top scorer on a further four occasions, as well as winning a second championship medal in 1993.

Cunningham first came to prominence on the inter-county scene as a member of the Cork minor team in 1986. An All-Ireland runner-up in his first year on the team, he was also an All-Ireland runner-up in 1988. Cunningham subsequently joined the Cork under-21 team, winning a Munster medal in 1991. By this stage he had also joined his brother, Ger, on the Cork senior team, making his debut during the 1987-88 league. Cunningham played a number of times before leaving the panel after the 1993 championship.

== Career statistics ==
=== Club ===
Team	Season	Cork		Munster		All-Ireland		Total	
Team	Season	Apps	Score	Apps	Score	Apps	Score	Apps	Score
St Finbarr's	1988-89	4	2-29	0	0-00	—		4	0-03
St Finbarr's	1989-90	4	0-30	—		—		4	0-30
St Finbarr's	1990-91	5	2-28	—		—		5	2-28
St Finbarr's	1991-92	2	1-07	—		—		2	1-07
St Finbarr's	1992-93	3	0-19	—		—		3	0-19
St Finbarr's	1993-94	4	0-24	0	0-00	—		5	2-28
St Finbarr's	1994-95	3	4-13	—		—		3	4-13
St Finbarr's	1995-96	3	2-09	—		—		3	2-09
St Finbarr's	1996-97	3	2-12	—		—		3	2-12
St Finbarr's	1997-98	2	0-12	—		—		2	0-12
St Finbarr's	1998-99	4	3-23	—		—		4	3-23
St Finbarr's	1999-00	4	0-14	—		—		4	0-14
St Finbarr's	2000-01	2	0-00	—		—		2	0-00
St Finbarr's	2001-02	2	1-14	—		—		2	1-14
St Finbarr's	2002-03	2	1-05	—		—		2	1-05
St Finbarr's	2003-04	2	1-08	—		—		2	1-08
Career total		49	19-247	0	0-00	—		49	19-247

== Honours ==
University College Cork

- Fitzgibbon Cup (3): 1988, 1990, 1991

St Finbarr's

- Cork Senior Hurling Championship (2): 1988, 1993

Cork

- Munster Under-21 Hurling Championship (1): 1991
- Munster Minor Hurling Championship (2): 1986, 1988
