= Denis Mulcahy =

Irish hurler

Personal information
- Native name: Donncha Ó Maolcatha (Irish)
- Nickname: Muller
- Born: 15 August 1956 (age 70) Midleton, County Cork, Ireland
- Occupation: Distillery employee
- Height: 6 ft 0 in (183 cm)

Sport
- Sport: Hurling
- Position: Right corner-back
Club
- Years: Club
- 1974-1993: Midleton
Club titles
- Cork titles: 4
- Munster titles: 2
- All-Ireland Titles: 1
Inter-county*
Years	County	Apps (scores)
1981–1992	Cork	24 (0-00)
Inter-county titles
- Munster titles: 4
- All-Irelands: 2
- NHL: 1
- All Stars: 1
- *Inter County team apps and scores correct as of 16:10, 17 May 2015.

Denis Mulcahy (born 15 August 1956) is an Irish retired hurler who played as a right corner-back for the Cork senior team.

Born in Midleton, County Cork, Mulcahy first played competitive hurling during his schooling at Midleton CBS. He arrived on the inter-county scene at the age of twenty when he first linked up with the Cork under-21 team. He made his senior debut during the 1980-81 league. Mulcahy subsequently became a regular member of the starting fifteen and won two All-Ireland medals, four Munster medals and one National Hurling League medal. He was an All-Ireland runner-up on one occasion.

As a member of the Munster inter-provincial team on a number of occasions, Mulcahy won one Railway Cup medal as a non-playing substitute. At club level he is a one-time All-Ireland medallist with Midleton. In addition to this he has also won two Munster medals and four championship medals.

Throughout his career Mulcahy made 24 championship appearances. His retirement came following the conclusion of the 1992 championship.

== Playing career ==
=== Club ===
After some success at underage levels, culminating in the winning of an East Cork minor championship in 1972, Mulcahy subsequently joined the Midleton intermediate team. In 1978 he enjoyed his first major success when he captured a championship medal in the intermediate grade as Midleton defeated Newtownshandrum by 1-12 to 1-10.

Five years later Mulcahy was left corner-back of the Midleton senior team that bridged a forty-five year gap to qualify for the championship decider. The opponents, St. Finbarr's, were appearing in their fifth successive decider and were hoping to secure fourth championship in-a-row. A 1-18 to 2-9 victory gave Midleton their first title since 1916, while Mulcahy collected his first championship medal. He later collected a Munster medal following a 1-14 to 1-11 defeat of Borris-Ileigh in the provincial decider.

Two-in-a-row proved beyond Midleton, while the club also lost the decider to Blackrock in 1985. The following year Midleton were back in the decider and Mulcahy collected a second championship medal as the club secured a 1-18 to 1-10 defeat of Blackrock.

In 1987 Midleton faced Na Piarsaigh in the championship decider. An exciting 2-12 to 0-15 victory gave Mulcahy a third championship medal. He later won a second Munster medal as Cappawhite were accounted for by 1-12 to 1-11 in the provincial decider. On 17 March 1988 Midleton faced Athenry in the All-Ireland decider and a close game developed. Two early goals by Kevin Hennessy and a kicked goal by Colm O'Neill gave Midleton a 3–8 to 0–9 victory and gave Mulcahy an All-Ireland Senior Club Hurling Championship medal.

Mulcahy was in the twilight of his career in 1991 when Midleton reached the championship decider once again. A 1-17 to 1-8 defeat of Glen Rovers gave him his fourth championship medal.

=== Inter-county ===
Mulcahy first played for Cork as a member of the under-21 hurling team on 13 April 1977. He was at full-back on his debut in a 4-12 to 0-7 Munster quarter-final defeat of Clare. He was dropped from the starting fifteen for Cork's subsequent provincial final defeat of Limerick and their All-Ireland defeat by Kilkenny.

During the 1980-81 league campaign Mulcahy was included on the Cork senior team. He won a National Hurling League medal that year when he came on as a substitute in Cork's 3-11 to 2-8 defeat of Offaly in the league decider. Mulcahy was later included as a substitute for the championship, however, Cork fell at the first hurdle.

Mulcahy made his senior championship debut on 3 June 1984 in a 3-15 to 2-13 Munster semi-final defeat of Limerick. Cork proved to be the dominant force in Munster once again, with Mulcahy winning a first Munster medal following a memorable 4–15 to 3–14 defeat of Tipperary in the provincial showpiece. The subsequent All-Ireland final on 2 September 1984, played at Semple Stadium in Thurles, saw Cork take on Offaly for the first time ever in championship history. The centenary-year final failed to live up to expectations and Cork recorded a relatively easy 3–16 to 1–12 victory. It was Mulcahy's first All-Ireland medal. A week later Mulcahy was at centre-back on the Cork junior football team that faced Warwickshire in the All-Ireland decider. A huge 3-20 to 0-7 victory gave him an All-Ireland Junior Football Championship medal.

In 1985 Mulcahy added a second Munster medal to his collection as Cork defeated Tipperary by 4–17 to 4–11 in the provincial decider once again.

Cork made it five-in-a-row in Munster in 1986 as they defeated Clare by 2–18 to 3–12 to take the provincial title. It was Mulcahy's third Munster medal. This victory paved the way for an All-Ireland final meeting with Galway on 7 September 1986. The men from the west were the red-hot favourites against a Cork team in decline, however, on the day a different story unfolded. Four Cork goals, one from John Fenton, two from Tomás Mulcahy and one from Kevin Hennessy, stymied the Galway attack and helped the Rebels to a 4–13 to 2–15 victory. It was Mulcahy's second All-Ireland medal while he was later honoured with an All-Star.

Tipperary bested Cork over the next two years, with Mulcahy serving as captain in 1988. Waterford beat Cork in the provincial semi-final in 1989 and Mulcahy effectively brought the curtain down on his inter-county career.

Mulcahy's impressive display at full-back during Midleton's club championship success in 1991 saw him being recalled to the Cork team in 1992. He later won a fourth Munster medal as Cork defeated Limerick by 1-22 to 3-11. On 6 September 1992 Cork faced Kilkenny in the All-Ireland decider for the first time in a decade. After playing with the wind for the opening half Cork were ahead by two points at the interval. John Power and Michael Phelan added two second-half goals to the one D. J. Carey scored in the first half to give Kilkenny a 3–10 to 1–12 victory.

=== Inter-provincial ===
Mulcahy also had the honour of being selected to play for Munster in the inter-provincial series of games. He played with his province for four seasons from 1985 until 1988, winning just one Railway Cup winners' medal in his first year. Munster defeated Connacht by a single point on that occasion.

== Honours ==
Midleton

- All-Ireland Senior Club Hurling Championship: 1988
- Munster Senior Club Hurling Championship: 1983, 1987
- Cork Senior Hurling Championship: 1983, 1986, 1987, 1991
- Cork Intermediate Football Championship: 1984
- Cork Intermediate Hurling Championship: 1978
- East Cork Minor Hurling Championship: 1972

Imokilly

- Cork Senior Football Championship: 1984

Cork

- All-Ireland Senior Hurling Championship: 1984, 1986
- Munster Senior Hurling Championship: 1984, 1985, 1986, 1992
- National Hurling League: 1980-81
- All-Ireland Junior Football Championship: 1984
- Munster Junior Football Championship: 1984
- Munster Under-21 Hurling Championship: 1977

Munster

- Railway Cup: 1985

Sporting positions
Preceded by Kevin Hennessy	Cork senior hurling team captain 1988	Succeeded by Ger Cunningham
