= Ger Glavin =

Irish Gaelic footballer and hurler (1956–2023)

Personal information
- Native name: Gearóid Ó Gláimhín (Irish)
- Born: 1956 Midleton, County Cork, Ireland
- Died: 25 March 2023 (aged 66) Ballincollig, Cork, Ireland
- Occupation: Bank official

Sport
- Sport: Gaelic football
- Position: Centre-forward
Clubs
- Years: Club
- 1974-1992 1980-1984 1993-1998: Midleton → Imokilly; Ballincollig
Club titles
	Football	Hurling
Cork titles	1	3
Munster titles	0	2
All-Ireland titles	0	1
Inter-county
Years	County	Apps (scores)
1984-1985	Cork	0 (0-00)
Inter-county titles
- Munster titles: 0
- All-Irelands: 0
- NFL: 0
- All Stars: 0

Gerard P. Glavin (1956 – 25 March 2023) was an Irish Gaelic footballer and hurler. At club level, he played with Midleton, Ballincollig and divisional side Imokilly and was also a member of the Cork senior football team.

== Career ==
Glavin first played hurling and Gaelic football at club level with Midleton. After progressing through the juvenile and underage ranks, his first success at adult level came in 1978 when Midleton won the Cork IHC title. He won the first of three Cork SHC titles and the first of two Munster Club SHC titles in 1983. Glavin had one of his most successful club seasons in 1984 when he captained the Midleton junior team to the Cork JAHC before winning a Cork IFC title. He was also part of the Imokilly divisional team that won the Cork SFC title in 1984. Glavin achieved the ultimate club success when Midleton beat Gort in the 1988 All-Ireland senior club final. He later transferred to Ballincollig and won a second Cork IFC with his adopted club in 1994.

Glavin first appeared on the inter-county scene with Cork as a member of the junior team. He won a Munster JFC title in 1984, however, he later lost his place on the starting fifteen and was listed amongst the substitutes when Cork beat Warwickshire in the 1984 All-Ireland junior final. Glavin earned a call-up to the Cork senior team following this success, and he made a number of appearances during the opening stages of the 1984–85 National League. He lined out with the junior team in 1985.

== Personal life and death ==
Glavin was raised in Midleton and attended Midleton CBS Secondary School. His father, Phil Glavin, was a member of the Midleton Urban District Council in the 1960s and 1970s. His brother, Willie Glavin, won an All-Ireland MHC medal with Cork in 1967.

Glavin died on 25 March 2023, at the age of 66.

== Honours ==
Midleton

- All-Ireland Senior Club Hurling Championship: 1988
- Munster Senior Club Hurling Championship: 1983, 1987
- Cork Senior Hurling Championship: 1983, 1986, 1987
- Cork Intermediate Football Championship: 1984
- Cork Intermediate Hurling Championship: 1978
- Cork Junior A Hurling Championship: 1984 (c)
- East Cork Junior A Hurling Championship: 1984 (c)

Ballincollig

- Cork Intermediate Football Championship: 1994

Imokilly

- Cork Senior Football Championship: 1984

Cork

- All-Ireland Junior Football Championship: 1984
- Munster Junior Football Championship: 1984
