= John Hartnett (hurler) =

Irish hurler

Personal information
- Native name: Seán Ó hAirtnéada (Irish)
- Born: 1960 (age 65–66) Midleton, County Cork, Ireland

Sport
- Sport: Hurling
- Position: Centre-forward
Club
- Years: Club
- Midleton
Club titles
- Cork titles: 4
- Munster titles: 2
- All-Ireland Titles: 1
Inter-county
Years	County	Apps (scores)
1983-1986	Cork	3 (0-00)
Inter-county titles
- Munster titles: 2
- All-Irelands: 1
- NHL: 0
- All Stars: 0

John Hartnett (born 1960) is an Irish former hurler. At club level, he played with Midleton and at inter-county level with the Cork senior hurling team.

== Career ==
At club level, Hartnett first played for Midleton as a dual player in the juvenile and underage grades. He was part of the Midleton team that won the Cork U21HC title in 1979, after a 3–11 to 2–04 defeat of Milford.

Hartnett collected his first silverware at adult level when, in 1978, Midleton secured the Cork IHC title after a win over Newtownshandrum in the final. Hartnett later won Cork SHC medals between 1983 and 1991. He also claimed two Munster Club SHC titles during this period, and was at centre-forward for Midleton's 3–08 to 0–09 defeat of Athenry in the 1988 All-Ireland Club SHC final.

At inter-county level, Hartnett first played for Cork during a two-year tenure with the minor team. He won consecutive Munster MHC medals, before lining out at midfield in Cork's defeat of Kilkenny in the 1978 All-Ireland MHC final. Hartnett subsequently lined out with the under-21 team.

Hartnett was drafted onto the senior team in October 1983. He was listed amongst the substitutes for Cork's 3–16 to 1–12 defeat of Offaly in the 1984 All-Ireland final. Hartnett also won consecutive Munster SHC medals.

== Honours ==
Midleton

- All-Ireland Senior Club Hurling Championship: 1988
- Munster Senior Club Hurling Championship: 1983, 1987
- Cork Senior Hurling Championship: 1983, 1986, 1987, 1991
- Cork Intermediate Football Championship: 1984
- Cork Intermediate Hurling Championship: 1978
- Cork Under-21 Hurling Championship: 1979

Cork

- All-Ireland Senior Hurling Championship: 1984
- Munster Senior Hurling Championship: 1984, 1985
- All-Ireland Minor Hurling Championship: 1978
- Munster Minor Hurling Championship: 1977, 1978
