= Ger Power (hurler) =

Irish hurler

Personal information
- Native name: Gearóid de Paor (Irish)
- Nickname: The King
- Born: 9 May 1960 (age 66) Midleton, County Cork, Ireland
- Occupation: Butcher
- Height: 5 ft 8 in (173 cm)

Sport
- Sport: Hurling
- Position: Goalkeeper
Club
- Years: Club
- 1980-1994: Midleton
Club titles
- Cork titles: 4
- Munster titles: 2
- All-Ireland Titles: 1
Inter-county
Years	County	Apps (scores)
1983-1989	Cork	0 (0-00)
Inter-county titles
- Munster titles: 2
- All-Irelands: 1
- NHL: 0
- All Stars: 0

Gerard Power (born 9 May 1960) is an Irish former hurler. At club level, he played with Midleton and at inter-county level with the Cork senior hurling team.

== Career ==
At club level, Power first played for Midleton as a dual player in the juvenile and underage grades. He was part of the Midleton team that claimed the Cork U21HC title in 1979, after a 3–11 to 2–04 defeat of Milford. Power eventually became the goalkeeper on the club's senior team and won four Cork SHC medals between 1983 and 1991. He also claimed two Munster Club SHC titles during this period, and captained Midleton to a 3–08 to 0–09 defeat of Athenry in the 1988 All-Ireland Club SHC final.

Power first appeared on the inter-county scene for Cork when he was drafted onto the senior team in October 1983. He was substitute goalkeeper to Ger Cunningham for Cork's 3–16 to 1–12 defeat of Offaly in the 1984 All-Ireland final. Power also won consecutive Munster SHC medals. He remained on the panel as sub-goalkeeper until 1989.

== Honours ==
Midleton

- All-Ireland Senior Club Hurling Championship: 1988 (c)
- Munster Senior Club Hurling Championship: 1983, 1987 (c)
- Cork Senior Hurling Championship: 1983, 1986, 1987 (c), 1991
- Cork Intermediate Football Championship: 1984
- Cork Under-21 Hurling Championship: 1979

Cork

- All-Ireland Senior Hurling Championship: 1984
- Munster Senior Hurling Championship: 1984, 1985

Achievements
Preceded by Mick Ryan	All-Ireland Senior Club Hurling Final winning captain 1988	Succeeded by Pat Kenny
