= 1985 Cork Senior Hurling Championship =

Annual hurling competition season

- Dates: 4 May – 29 September 1985
- Teams: 18
- Champions: Blackrock (29th title); Andy Creagh (captain); Tim Murphy (manager)
- Runners-up: Midleton; Pat Hartnett (captain); Denis Kelleher (manager)

Tournament statistics
- Matches played: 18
- Goals scored: 64 (3.56 per match)
- Points scored: 365 (20.28 per match)
- Top scorer(s): Finbarr Delaney (3-22)

The 1985 Cork Senior Hurling Championship was the 97th staging of the Cork Senior Hurling Championship since its establishment by the Cork County Board in 1887. The championship began on 4 May 1985 and ended on 29 September 1985.

St. Finbarr's entered the championship as the defending champions, however, they were beaten by Carbery in the second round.

The final was played on 29 September 1985 at Páirc Uí Chaoimh in Cork, between Blackrock and Midleton, in what was their first meeting in the final in 70 years. Blackrock won the match by 1–14 to 1–08 to claim their 29th championship title overall and a first title in six years.

Blackrock's Finbarr Delaney was the championship's top scorer with 3-22.

== Team changes ==
=== To Championship ===
Promoted from the Cork Intermediate Hurling Championship

- Erin's Own

=== From Championship ===
Regraded to the Cork Intermediate Hurling Championship

- Nemo Rangers

== Results ==
=== First round ===
4 May 1985 First round	Seandún	4-07 - 1-06	Duhallow	Fr. Con Buckley Park
	P Walsh 2-0, P McCarthy 2-0, E Murphy 0-2, G McCarthy 0-2, J Crowley 0-1, T Harrington 0-1, C Coffey 0-1.		P Smith 1-0, T Mullane 0-2, D Sheehan 0-2, G Sheehan 0-2.	Referee: P Noonan (Newtownshandrum)

4 May 1985 First round	Erin's Own	2-07 - 2-08	Carrigdhoun	Church Road
	M Bowen 1-5, R O'Connor 1-0, B Murphy 0-1, PJ Murphy 0-1.		D Dunne 1-2, A O'Driscoll 1-0, J Drinan 0-3, J Dineen 0-1, B O'Sullivan 0-1, D McCarthy 0-1.	Referee: W Horgan (Brian Dillons)

=== Second round ===
4 May 1985 Second round	Ballyhea	1-07 - 2-11	Imokilly	Páirc Mac Gearailt
	G O'Connor 1-0, D O'Flynn 0-2, D Ryan 0-2, J O'Callaghan 0-1, L O'Connor 0-1, L O'Halloran 0-1.		M Treacy 1-2, P Cahill 1-2, J Lewis 0-3, K Murphy 0-2, J Halbert 0-1, P Devlin 0-1.	Referee: M O'Flaherty (Blackrock)

4 May 1985 Second round	Carbery	2-09 - 2-08	St. Finbarr's	Cloughduv
	R Wilmot 1-3, T Crowley 1-1, P Crowley 0-3, R O'Regan 0-1, N Crowley 0-1.		D Walsh 1-3, J Meyler 1-2, B Searls 0-1, J Cremin 0-1, F Ramsey 0-1.	Referee: M Keane (Cloughduv)

4 May 1985 Second round	Muskerry	1-08 - 5-08	Sarsfields	Ballinhassig
	D Desmond 0-4, M O'Donoghue 1-0, P Maher 0-2, J O'Leary 0-1, M McDonnell 0-1.		P O'Riordan 3-0, T Murphy 1-4, G McEvoy 1-0, B Lotty 0-2, B Óg Murphy 0-2.	Referee: P Cronin (St. Finbarr's)

4 May 1985 Second round	Na Piarsaigh	0-04 - 3-11	Midleton	Carrigtwohill
	T O'Sullivan 0-4.		J Fenton 1-5, G Glavin 1-1, K Hennessy 0-4, C O'Neill 1-0, T McCarthy 0-1.	Referee: F Murphy (Blackrock)

4 May 1985 Second round	University College Cork	1-08 - 5-26	Blackrock	Ballinlough
	M Foley 1-3, M Quaid 0-3, D Burke 0-1, M Walsh 0-1.		F Delaney 1-9, É O'Donoghue 3-1, J Cashman 1-3, T Deasy 0-5, P Kavanagh 0-3, P Deasy 0-2, P Moylan 0-1, F Collins 0-1, D Mac Curtain 0-1.	Referee: D O'Connor

19 May 1985 Second round	Avondhu	0-07 - 1-08	Carrigdhoun	Bride Rovers Park
	D Relihan 0-2, J Dennehy 0-2, J Keane 0-1, D Curtin 0-1, C O'Sullivan 0-1.		K Kingston 1-3, D McCarthy 0-2, D Dunne 0-1, S McCarthy 0-1, J Drinan 0-1.

25 May 1985 Second round	Youghal	0-09 - 0-16	Milford	Mitchelstown
	T Coyne 0-4, S Ring 0-2, J Kennedy 0-1, P Grace 0-1, G Cotter 0-1.		M Fitzgibbon 0-9, P Buckley 0-2, N Fitzgibbon 0-2, S O'Gorman 0-1, S Sheehan 0-1, J Fitzgibbon 0-1.	Referee: M Beecher (Ballyhooley)

26 May 1985 Second round	Seandún	1-04 - 0-08	Glen Rovers	Church Road
	E Lingane 1-1, G McCarthy 0-2, M O'Regan 0-1.		P Barry 0-4, C Ring 0-2, T Mulcahy 0-1, D Cronin 0-1.	Referee: M Keane (Cloughduv)

=== Quarter-finals ===
8 June 1985 Quarter-final	Sarsfields	3-04 - 0-10	Imokilly	Clonmult Memorial Park
	B Óg Murphy 1-2, T Murphy 1-1, P O'Riordan 1-0, J Barry 0-1.		P Cahill 0-5, J Lewis 0-1, D Walsh 0-1, J Horgan 0-1, P Ronan 0-1, D Ahern 0-1.	Referee: W Horgan (Brian Dillons)

9 June 1985 Quarter-final	Milford	1-16 - 1-06	Carbery	Millstreet
	P Buckley 1-5, M Fitzgibbon 0-5, S Sheehan 0-4, V Sheehan 0-1, J O'Gorman 0-1.		E Kenneally 1-4, R Wilmot 0-1, P O'Donovan 0-1.	Referee: M Keane (Cloughduv)

28 June 1985 Quarter-final	Blackrock	0-16 - 2-10	Glen Rovers	Páirc Uí Chaoimh
	F Delaney 0-5, T Deasy 0-4, T Cashman 0-3, P Deasy 0-2, É O'Donoghue 0-1, M Kilcoyne 0-1.		J Fitzgibbon 2-1, P Horgan 0-5, P Barry 0-1, K McGuckian 0-1, T Mulcahy 0-1, T O'Neill 0-1.	Referee: M Keane

30 June 1985 Quarter-final	Midleton	3-15 - 2-10	Carrigdhoun	Liam MacCarthy Park
	J Fenton 0-6, C O'Neill 1-1, G Glavin 1-1, J Boylan 1-1, D Boylan 0-2, K Hennessy 0-2, P Hartnett 0-1, T McCarthy 0-1.		S McCarthy 0-5, B Scanlon 1-0, A O'Driscoll 1-0, K Kingston 0-3, L Kelly 0-1, W Ashman 0-1.	Referee: W Horgan (Brian Dillons)

8 September 1985 Quarter-final replay	Blackrock	2-19 - 1-11	Glen Rovers	Páirc Uí Chaoimh
	F Delaney 1-3, F Collins 0-6, M Kilcoyne 1-1, É O'Donoghue 0-3, T Deasy 0-2, J Cashman 0-1, T Cashman 0-1, P Kavanagh 0-1, P Deasy 0-1.		J Buckley 1-2, C McGuckian 0-3, C Ring 0-2, P Horgan 0-1, A Kinsella 0-1, T O'Neill 0-1, J Fitzgibbon 0-1.	Referee: M Keane

=== Semi-finals ===
10 August 1985 Semi-final	Midleton	6-14 - 5-10	Sarsfields	Páirc Uí Chonaill
	J Fenton 1-7, G Fitzgerald 2-3, G Glavin 2-2, M Hartnett 1-0, J Hartnett 0-2.		B Óg Murphy 1-5, P O'Riordan 2-0, M Carroll 1-2, T Murphy 1-1, K Looney 0-1.	Referee: J Motherway (Aghada)

15 September 1985 Semi-final	Blackrock	3-08 - 0-14	Milford	Páirc Mac Gearailt
	É O'Donoghue 3-2, T Deasy 0-2, F Delaney 0-2, M Kilcoyne 0-1, J Cashman 0-1.		M Fitzgibbon 0-5, N Fitzgibbon 0-4, J Dillon 0-2, S Sheehan 0-1, V Sheehan 0-1, C Collins 0-1.	Referee: J Motherway (Aghada)

=== Final ===
29 September 1985 Final	Blackrock	1-14 - 1-08	Midleton	Páirc Uí Chaoimh
	F Delaney 1-3, P Kavanagh 0-3, P Deasy 0-2, T Cashman 0-2, E Kavanagh 0-2, É O'Donoghue 0-1, M Kilcoyne 0-1.		K Hennessy 1-0, C O'Neill 0-2, G Fitzgerald 0-2, J Fenton 0-2, D Boylan 0-1, P Hartnett 0-1.

== Championship statistics ==
=== Top scorers ===
Top scorers overall

Rank	Player	Club	Tally	Total	Matches	Average
1	Finbarr Delaney	Blackrock	3-22	31	5	6.20
2	Éamonn O'Donoghue	Blackrock	6-08	26	5	5.20
2	John Fenton	Midleton	2-20	26	4	6.50
4	Mossie Fitzgibbon	Milford	0-19	19	3	6.33
5	Paul O'Riordan	Sarsfields	6-00	18	3	6.00
6	George Galvin	Midleton	4-04	16	4	4.00
7	Tadhg Murphy	Sarsfields	3-06	15	3	5.00
7	Bertie Óg Murphy	Sarsfields	2-09	15	3	5.00
9	Tim Deasy	Blackrock	0-13	13	4	3.25
10	Ger Fitzgerald	Midleton	2-05	11	2	5.50

Top scorers in a single game

Rank	Player	Club	Tally	Total	Opposition
1	Finbarr Delaney	Blackrock	1-09	12	UCC
2	Éamonn O'Donoghue	Blackrock	3-02	11	Milford
3	Éamonn O'Donoghue	Blackrock	3-01	10	UCC
3	John Fenton	Midleton	1-07	10	Sarsfields
5	Paul O'Riordan	Sarsfields	3-00	9	Muskerry
5	Ger FitzGerald	Midleton	2-03	9	Sarsfields
5	Mossie Fitzgibbon	Milford	0-09	9	Youghal
8	Ger Glavin	Midleton	2-02	8	Sarsfields
8	Bertie Óg Murphy	Sarsfields	1-05	8	Midleton
8	Martin Bowen	Erin's Own	1-05	8	Carrigdhoun
8	John Fenton	Midleton	1-05	8	Na Piarsaigh
8	Pat Buckley	Milford	1-05	8	Carbery

=== Miscellaneous ===
- Milford qualified for the semi-final stage of the championship for the first time in their history.
