= Pat Hartnett (hurler) =

Irish hurler, coach, and selector

Personal information
- Native name: Pádraig Ó hAirtnéid (Irish)
- Born: 1 December 1962 (age 63) Midleton, County Cork, Ireland
- Occupation: Dental surgeon
- Height: 5 ft 10 in (178 cm)

Sport
- Sport: Hurling
- Position: Wing-back
Club
- Years: Club
- Midleton
Club titles
- Cork titles: 4
- Munster titles: 2
- All-Ireland Titles: 1
College
- Years: College
- University College Cork
College titles
- Fitzgibbon titles: 1
Inter-county
Years	County	Apps (scores)
1984-1994	Cork	21 (0-10)
Inter-county titles
- Munster titles: 4
- All-Irelands: 2
- NHL: 1
- All Stars: 0

Pat Hartnett (born 1 December 1962) is an Irish hurling selector, coach and former player. His league and championship career with the Cork senior team spanned eleven seasons from 1984 to 1994.

Born in Midleton, County Cork, Hartnett first played competitive hurling at St. Colman's College in Fermoy. Here he was a member of the senior team that played in the Harty Cup. Hartnett later lined out with University College Cork, winning a Fitzgibbon Cup medal in 1985.

Hartnett first appeared for the Midleton club at juvenile and underage levels, winning county under-21 championship medals. He later joined the club's senior team and won an All-Ireland medal in 1988. Hartnett also won two Munster medals and four county senior championship medals.

In spite of never having played minor hurling for Cork, Hartnett made his debut on the inter-county scene at the age of nineteen when he was selected for the Cork under-21 team. He enjoyed two championship seasons with the under-21 team, winning an All-Ireland medal as a non-playing substitute in 1982. Hartnett subsequently joined his brother, John, on the Cork senior team, making his debut during the 1984 championship. Over the course of the next ten years, he won two All-Ireland medals, beginning with a lone triumph in his debut season in 1984 before adding a second winners' medal in 1986. Hartnett also won four Munster medals and one National Hurling League medal.

After being chosen on the Munster Munster inter-provincial team for the first time in 1985, Hartnett was an automatic choice on the starting fifteen for three consecutive seasons. During that time he won one Railway Cup medal.

After being involved in team management and coaching with the Midleton under-21 hurling team, Hartnett was appointed as a selector to the Cork minor team in 2014. He became a senior selector as part of Kieran Kingston's management team in 2015.

== Honours ==
University College Cork

- Fitzgibbon Cup (1): 1985

Midleton

- All-Ireland Senior Club Hurling Championship (1): 1988
- Munster Senior Club Hurling Championship (2): 1983, 1987
- Cork Senior Hurling Championship (4): 1983, 1986, 1987, 1991

Cork

- All-Ireland Senior Hurling Championship (2): 1984, 1986
- Munster Senior Hurling Championship (4): 1984, 1985, 1986, 1992
- National Hurling League (1): 1992-93
- All-Ireland Under-21 Hurling Championship (1): 1982
- Munster Under-21 Hurling Championship (1): 1982

Munster

- Railway Cup (1): 1985
