= John Fitzgibbon (Cork hurler) =

Irish hurler

Personal information
- Native name: Seán Mac Giobuin (Irish)
- Born: 6 May 1967 (age 59) Blackpool, Cork, Ireland
- Height: 5 ft 11 in (180 cm)

Sport
- Sport: Hurling
- Position: Corner-forward
Club
Years	Club	Apps (scores)
1985-1993	Glen Rovers	25 (19-32)
Club titles
- Cork titles: 1
Inter-county*
Years	County	Apps (scores)
1986-1993	Cork	17 (14-08)
Inter-county titles
- Munster titles: 3
- All-Irelands: 2
- NHL: 1
- All Stars: 2
- *Inter County team apps and scores correct as of 16:37, 6 April 2019.

John Fitzgibbon (born 6 May 1967) is a retired Irish hurler who played for Cork Senior Championship club Glen Rovers. He played for the Cork senior hurling team for seven seasons, during which time he usually lined out as a left corner-forward.

Fitzgibbon began his hurling career at club level with Glen Rovers. He broke onto the club's top adult team as an 18-year-old in 1985, having enjoyed championship successes in the minor and under-21 grades. Fitzgibbon was at right wing-forward on the Glen's 1989 Cork Senior Championship-winning team. He played his last club game in 1993 after making 25 championship appearances for Glen Rovers.

At inter-county level, Fitzgibbon was part of the successful Cork minor team that won the All-Ireland Championship in 1985 before later winning an All-Ireland Championship with the under-21 team in 1988. He joined the Cork senior team in 1986. From his debut, Fitzgibbon was ever-present as an inside forward and made a combined total of 38 National League and Championship appearances in a career that ended with his last game in 1993. During that time he was part of two All-Ireland Championship-winning teams – in 1986 and 1990. Fitzgibbon also secured three Munster Championship medals and a National Hurling League medal. Fitzgibbon's inter-county career ended in 1993 after he was forced to emigrate.

== Playing career ==
=== Glen Rovers ===
Fitzgibbon joined the Glen Rovers club from Brian Dillons at a young age and played in all grades at juvenile and underage levels. On 16 December 1984, he was only 17-years-old when he lined out at left corner-forward when Glen Rovers defeated Tracton by 1–14 to 2–09 to win the Cork Under-21 Championship.

On 6 October 1985, Fitzgibbon was selected to play at full-forward when Glen Rovers reached the final of the Cork Minor Championship. He scored a point from play in the 0–14 to 0–07 defeat of St. Patrick's in the final.

Fitzgibbon was still eligible for the minor grade when he was selected for the Glen Rovers senior team. He made his first appearance on 26 May 1985 when he was introduced as a substitute for the Glen's 0–08 to 1–04 defeat of Seandún.

On 16 October 1988, Fitzgibbon lined out in his first Cork Senior Championship final. He scored a point from full-forward in the 3–18 to 2–14 defeat by St. Finbarr's.

On 1 October 1989, Fitzgibbon was at right wing-back when Glen Rovers faced Sarsfields in the final of the Cork Senior Championship. He scored 1-03 from play and collected a winners' medal following the 4–15 to 3–13 victory. Fitzgibbon was also named as the man of the match.

On 22 September 1991, Fitzgibbon was selected at full-forward when Glen Rovers faced Midleton in the Cork Senior Championship final. He was held scoreless as Glen Rovers suffered a 1–17 to 1–08 defeat.

=== Cork ===
==== Minor and under-21 ====
Fitzgibbon first played for Cork as a member of the minor team during the 1984 Munster Championship. He made his first appearance for the team on 18 April when he lined out at right corner-back in a 1–18 to 3–04 defeat of Kerry.

On 7 July 1985, Fitzgibbon won a Munster Championship medal after scoring a point from left corner-forward in a 1–13 to 1–08 defeat of Tipperary in the final. He was switched to left wing-forward for the All-Ireland final against Wexford on 1 September. Fitzgibbon scored a 37th-minute goal in the 3–10 to 0–12 victory.

Fitzgibbon was added to the Cork under-21 team for the 1987 Munster Championship. He made his first appearance on 22 April when he scored two points from left corner-forward in a 1–15 to 2–05 defeat of Clare.

On 27 July 1988, Fitzgibbon won a Munster Championship medal after scoring 1-01 from left corner-forward in a 4–12 to 1–07 defeat of Limerick in the final. He was moved to the left wing-forward position for the All-Ireland final against Kilkenny on 11 September. Fitzgibbon goaled after just 15 seconds in the 4–11 to 1–05 victory.

==== Senior ====
Fitzgibbon was selected for the Cork senior team for the first time on 8 June 1986. He was an unused substitute for the 6–13 to 0–09 defeat of Waterford in the Munster Championship. After impressing in a series of challenge matches, Fitzgibbon was named at right corner-forward for the Munster final against Clare. He scored 1-01 from play in the 2–18 to 3–12 victory. He was dropped from the starting fifteen for the subsequent All-Ireland Championship. On 7 September, Fitzgibbon won an All-Ireland medal as a non-playing substitute in Cork's 4–13 to 2–15 defeat of Galway in the final.

On 15 July 1990, Fitzgibbon was selected at left corner-forward for Cork's Munster final meeting with Tipperary. He scored two goals and collected a second provincial winners' medal following the 4–16 to 2–14 defeat of Tipperary. On 2 September, Fitzgibbon was again at left corner-forward for the All-Ireland final against Galway. He scored two goals in the space of 90 seconds in the second half to help Cork to a 5–15 to 2–21 victory. It was Fitzgibbon's second winners' medal overall and his first on the field of play. He ended the season by being selected for the All-Star team.

Fitzgibbon ended the 1991 season with a second consecutive All-Star award.

On 5 July 1992, Fitzgibbon won a third Munster Championship medal after lining out at left corner-forward in Cork's 1–22 to 3–11 defeat of Limerick in the final. He was retained at left corner-forward for the subsequent All-Ireland final against Kilkenny. Fitzgibbon was once again held scoreless in the 3–10 to 1–12 defeat.

On 22 May 1993, Fitzgibbon was named as a substitute for Cork second National League final replay with Wexford. He scored a goal after being introduced as a substitute in the 3–11 to 1–12 victory.

== Career statistics ==
=== Club ===
Team	Year	Cork		Munster		All-Ireland		Total	
Team	Year	Apps	Score	Apps	Score	Apps	Score	Apps	Score
Glen Rovers	1985	3	2-02	—		—		3	2-02
Glen Rovers	1986	1	3-01	—		—		1	3-01
Glen Rovers	1987	3	4-05	—		—		3	4-05
Glen Rovers	1988	4	2-05	—		—		4	2-05
Glen Rovers	1989	4	3-08	2	2-01	—		6	5-09
Glen Rovers	1990	2	2-02	—		—		2	2-02
Glen Rovers	1991	4	1-07	—		—		4	1-07
Glen Rovers	1992	1	0-01	—		—		1	0-01
Glen Rovers	1993	1	0-00	—		—		1	0-00
Career total		23	17-31	2	2-01	—		25	19-32

=== Inter-county ===
Team	Year	National League			Munster		All-Ireland		Total	
Team	Year	Division	Apps	Score	Apps	Score	Apps	Score	Apps	Score
Cork	1985-86	Division 1	—		1	1-01	0	0-00	1	1-01
Cork	1986-87	Division 1	3	3-00	4	2-00	—		7	5-00
Cork	1987-88	Division 1	—		—		—		—	
Cork	1988-89	Division 2	—		1	0-00	—		1	0-00
Cork	1989-90	Division 1	9	4-06	1	2-00	2	4-01	12	10-07
Cork	1990-91	Division 1	3	0-01	3	4-03	—		6	4-04
Cork	1991-92	Division 1B	4	2-02	3	1-01	1	0-00	8	3-03
Cork	1992-93	Division 1B	2	1-00	1	0-02	—		3	1-02
Career total			21	10-09	14	10-07	3	4-01	38	24-17

== Honours ==
Glen Rovers

- Cork Senior Hurling Championship (1): 1989
- Cork Under-21 Hurling Championship (1): 1984
- Cork Minor Hurling Championship (1): 1985

Cork

- All-Ireland Senior Hurling Championship (1): 1986, 1990
- Munster Senior Hurling Championship (1): 1986, 1990, 1992
- All-Ireland Under-21 Hurling Championship (1): 1988
- Munster Under-21 Hurling Championship (1): 1988
- All-Ireland Minor Hurling Championship (1): 1985
- Munster Minor Hurling Championship (1): 1985
