= Paddy FitzGerald =

Irish hurler

Personal information
- Native name: Páidí Mac Gearailt (Irish)
- Born: 1939 (age 86–87) Midleton, County Cork, Ireland
- Height: 5 ft 10 in (178 cm)

Sport
- Sport: Hurling
- Position: Left wing-back
Clubs
- Years: Club
- Midleton → Imokilly
Club titles
- Cork titles: 0
Inter-county
| Years | County | Apps (scores) |
| 1958-1968 | Cork | 21 (1-02) |
Inter-county titles
- Munster titles: 1
- All-Irelands: 1
- NHL: 0

Patrick FitzGerald (born 1939) is an Irish former hurler and manager. At club level he played with Midleton and Imokilly and was also a member of the Cork senior hurling team. His son, Ger FitzGerald, also played with Midleton and Cork.

== Club career ==
Born and raised in Midleton, County Cork, FitzGerald first played hurling as a schoolboy with Midleton CBS Secondary School. He progressed through the juvenile and underage ranks with the Midleton club before eventually joining the club's intermediate team. FitzGerald was part of the Midleton team that won the 1962 Cork IHC title after a defeat of Cobh. His performances for Midleton also earned a call-up to divisional side Imokilly and he was a member of the team that was beaten by St Finbarr's in the 1968 final.

== Inter-county career ==
FitzGerald first played at inter-county level as a member of the Cork minor hurling team. His two-year association with the team ended with consecutive defeats by Tipperary. FitzGerald's progression onto the Cork senior hurling team was instant and he made his debut against Dublin in the 1957-58 National League. He made his first championship appearance in a game against Tipperary later that season.

After being dropped from the Cork senior team in 1960, FitzGerald was later drafted onto the intermediate team for their unsuccessful 1961 championship campaign. His performances in this grade earned a recall to the senior team in 1962 and he was a regular member of the starting fifteen in the years that followed. FitzGerald was at left wing-back on the Cork team that beat Kilkenny in the 1966 All-Ireland final, having earlier won a Munster Championship medal. He played his last game for the Cork senior team in 1968, however, he returned to inter-county activity with the intermediate team in 1970.

== Inter-provincial career ==
FitzGerald's performances at inter-county level resulted in his selection for Munster in their 1964 Railway Cup final defeat by Leinster. It was the first of four successive appearances in finals with the inter-provincial team, with FitzGerald claiming a winners' medal after a defeat of Leinster in 1966.

== Coaching career ==
FitzGerald's first major role in management came when he was appointed as a selector with the Cork senior hurling team in September 1974. He was part of the selection committee the following year that helped secure the Munster Championship title before later losing to Galway in the 1975 All-Ireland semi-final.

FitzGerald spent a long number of years over a period of three decades as coach and trainer with Midleton. He enjoyed his first success at club level when Midleton won the 1978 Cork IHC title. After a brief time away from the team, FitzGerald returned to guide Midleton through the most successful period in their history. Midleton, under FitzGerald, won three Cork SHC titles between 1986 and 1991, however, the high point of his tenure in charge was the securing of the All-Ireland Club Championship title in 1988.

== Honours ==
=== Player ===
Midleton

- Cork Intermediate Hurling Championship: 1962

Cork

- All-Ireland Senior Hurling Championship: 1966
- Munster Senior Hurling Championship: 1966

Munster

- Railway Cup: 1966

=== Coach ===
Midleton

- All-Ireland Senior Club Hurling Championship: 1988
- Munster Senior Club Hurling Championship: 1987
- Cork Senior Hurling Championship: 1986, 1987, 1991
- Cork Intermediate Hurling Championship: 1978
- Cork Junior A Hurling Championship: 1984
- East Cork Junior A Hurling Championship: 1984

Cork

- Munster Senior Hurling Championship: 1975
