= Pat Hartnett =

Pat Hartnett may refer to:

- Pat Hartnett (footballer) (1910–1990), Australian rules footballer
- Pat Hartnett (hurler) (born 1960), Irish hurler for Cork
- Pat Hartnett (baseball) (1863–1935), baseball player
