= 1992 Munster Senior Hurling Championship final =

- Event: 1992 Munster Senior Hurling Championship
Cork	Limerick
1-22	3-11
- Date: 5 July 1992
- Venue: Páirc Uí Chaoimh, Cork
- Referee: Willie Barrett (Tipperary)
- Attendance: 48,036
- Weather: Sunny

The 1992 Munster Senior Hurling Championship final was contested by Limerick and Cork, and took place on 5 July 1992 at Páirc Uí Chaoimh in Cork. Cork, captained by Ger FitzGerald, won the game by 1–22 to 3–11.

== Route to the final ==
=== Cork ===
24 May
Quarter-Final

Cork	0-22 – 0-8	Kerry
T. O'Sullivan (0-9), T. Mulcahy (0-4), G. FitzGerald (0-3), K. Hennessy (0-2), B. Corcoran (0-2), C. Casey (0-1), P. Buckley (0-1).		D. Regan (0-5), C. Walsh (0-2), S. Sheehan (0-1).

Páirc Uí Chaoimh, Cork
Referee: J. McDonald (Tipperary)
7 June
Semi-Final

Cork	2-12 – 1-12	Tipperary
T. O'Sullivan (0-7), J. Fitzgibbon (1-1), T. Mulcahy (1-0), B. Corcoran (0-2), G. FitzGerald (0-1), K. Hennessy (0-1).		D. Ryan (1-1), M. Cleary (0-3), C. Stakelum (0-3), P. Fox (0-2), A. Ryan (0-2), D. Carr (0-1).

Páirc Uí Chaoimh, Cork
Attendance: 42,416
Referee: K. Walsh (Clare)

=== Limerick ===
14 June
Semi-Final

Limerick	2-13 – 1-13	Waterford
G. Kirby (1-4), J. O'Connor (1-2), A. Carmody (0-2), G. Hegarty (0-2), M. Houlihan (0-1), S. Fitzgibbon (0-1), A. Garvey (0-1).		J. Meaney (1-5), S. Daly (0-3), P. Prendergast (0-2), B. O'Sullivan (0-2), G. Fitzpatrick (0-1).

Semple Stadium, Thurles
Attendance: 19,228
Referee: Willie Barrett (Tipperary)

== Match ==
=== Details ===
5 July

Cork	1-22 – 3-11	Limerick
T. O'Sullivan (0-7), B. Egan (0-4), T. Mulcahy (1-0), G. Manley (0-3), C. Casey (0-3), S. McCarthy (0-3), K. Hennessy (0-2).		G. Kirby (1-8), D. Flynn (1-0), M. Reale (1-0), C. Carey (0-1), P. Davoren (0-1), R. Sampson (0-1).

Páirc Uí Chaoimh, Cork
Attendance: 48,036
Referee: Willie Barrett (Tipperary)
