= Colm O'Neill (Midleton Gaelic footballer) =

Irish hurler and Gaelic footballer

Personal information
- Native name: Colm Ó Néill (Irish)
- Born: 20 June 1964 (age 62) Midleton, County Cork, Ireland
- Occupation: Accountant
- Height: 6 ft 2 in (188 cm)

Sport
- Sport: Gaelic football
- Position: Full forward
Club
- Years: Club
- Midleton
Club titles
	Football	Hurling
Cork titles	0	3
Munster titles	0	2
All-Ireland titles	0	1
Inter-county
Years	County	Apps (scores)
1984-1991	Cork	16 (2-24)
Inter-county titles
- Munster titles: 4
- All-Irelands: 2
- NFL: 1
- All Stars: 0

Colm O'Neill (born 20 June 1964) is an Irish former Gaelic footballer. At club level he played with Midleton and was also a member of the Cork senior football team. O'Neill usually lined out as a forward.

== Playing career ==
O'Neill first came to prominence as a dual player at club level with Midleton. It was as a hurler that he enjoyed his greatest club success, winning an All-Ireland Club Championship title in 1988. O'Neill first appeared on the inter-county scene as a member of the Cork minor football team in 1981. He won an All-Ireland Minor Championship title in his debut season after scoring three goals in the final against Derry. A subsequent three-year spell with the under-21 team yielded two consecutive All-Ireland Under-21 Championship titles. O'Neill was still a member of the under-21 team when he was drafted onto the Cork senior football team in 1984. He went on to win consecutive All-Ireland Championship titles in 1989 and 1990, however, he was sent off for striking Mick Lyons in the 1990 All-Ireland final defeat of Meath. O'Neill's other honours with Cork include four consecutive Munster Championship titles and a National League title.

== Personal life ==
O'Neill immigrated to the United States after winning the Diversity Immigrant Visa lottery program. He currently lives in Colorado, and his son Shane is a professional footballer and a former United States youth international.

== Honours ==
Midleton

- All-Ireland Senior Club Hurling Championship: 1988
- Munster Senior Club Hurling Championship: 1983, 1987
- Cork Senior Club Hurling Championship: 1983, 1986, 1987

Cork

- All-Ireland Senior Football Championship: 1989, 1990
- Munster Senior Football Championship: 1987, 1988, 1989, 1990
- National Football League: 1988-89
- All-Ireland Under-21 Football Championship: 1984, 1985
- Munster Under-21 Football Championship: 1984, 1985
- All-Ireland Minor Football Championship: 1981
- Munster Minor Football Championship: 1981
