= 1889 Cork Senior Football Championship =

Gaelic football competition

- Champions: Midleton (1st title); Jim Power (captain)
- Runners-up: Macroom

The 1889 Cork Senior Football Championship was the third staging of the Cork Senior Football Championship since its establishment by the Cork County Board in 1887.

Lees were the defending champions.

Midleton won the championship following a 1–00 to 0–01 defeat of Macroom in the final at Cork Park. This was their first championship title.

== Results ==
=== Final ===
| 7 July 1889 Final | Midleton | 1-00 - 0-01 | Macroom | Ballincollig |

== Championship statistics ==
=== Miscellaneous ===
- Midleton win their first title.
- Macroom qualify for the final for the first time.
