= 1984 All-Ireland Senior Club Hurling Championship final =

- Event: 1983–84 All-Ireland Senior Club Hurling Championship
| Ballyhale Shamrocks | Gort |
| Ballyhale Shamrocks | Gort |
| 1-10 | 1-10 |
- Date: 15 April 1984
- Venue: O'Connor Park, Birr
- Referee: George Ryan (Tipperary)
- Attendance: 3,000

Replay
| Ballyhale Shamrocks | Gort |
| 1-10 | 0-7 |
- Date: 3 June 1984
- Venue: Semple Stadium, Thurles
- Referee: George Ryan (Tipperary)
- Attendance: 3,000

The 1984 All-Ireland Senior Club Hurling Championship final was a hurling match played at Croke Park on 15 April 1984 to determine the winners of the 1983–84 All-Ireland Senior Club Hurling Championship, the 14th season of the All-Ireland Senior Club Hurling Championship, a tournament organised by the Gaelic Athletic Association for the champion clubs of the four provinces of Ireland. The final was contested by Ballyhale Shamrocks of Kilkenny and Gort of Galway, with the game ending in a 1-10 apiece draw. The replay took place at Semple Stadium on 3 June 1984. Ballyhale.

The All-Ireland final was a unique occasion as it was the first ever championship meeting between Ballyhale Shamrocks and Castlegar. Ballyhale Shamrocks were hoping to win their second All-Ireland title while Gort were hoping to claim their first title.

Ballyhale Shamrocks were without the services of Liam Fennelly who sustained a leg injury playing for Kilkenny against Waterford. Castlegar held a half-time lead of 0-7 to 0-5. In the 41st minute the game was slipping away from Ballyhale when the selectors decided to risk Fennelly in spite of his injury. After setting up a goal for his brother Kevin he later engineered two frees to tie the match at 1-10 apiece. A third free, once again won by Fennelly, was sent wide.

The replay didn't take place for seven weeks and, once again, it was a close affair. The sides were level at 0-4 apiece after twenty minutes, before a goal from Ger Fennelly and a point from his brother Kevin put them ahead by 1-5 to 0-4 at the interval. The Gort challenge faltered in the second half and they only added two more points after the break.

Ballyhale Shamrocks victory secured their second All-Ireland title. They became the fifth club to win a second All-Ireland title.

== Match details ==
=== Drawn match ===
16 April 1984

| Ballyhale Shamrocks | 1-10 - 1-10 | Gort |
|---|---|---|
| K Fennelly 1-4 (2f), D Fennelly 0-2 (2f), G Fennelly 0-2 (2f), L Long 0-1 (1 '70'), M Fennelly 0-1. | | G Lally 0-5 (4f), M Cahill 1-1, K Fajy 0-2, P Hehir 0-1, S Linnane 0-1 (1sl). |

O'Connor Park, Birr
Attendance: 3,000
Referee: G Ryan (Tipperary)

=== Replay ===
3 June 1984

| Ballyhale Shamrocks | 1-10 - 0-7 | Gort |
|---|---|---|
| D Fennelly 0-5, K Fennelly 0-4, G Fennelly 1-0, B Fennelly 0-1. | | P Piggott 0-3, G Lally 0-3, G Linnane 0-1. |

O'Connor Park, Birr
Attendance: 3,000
Referee: G Ryan (Tipperary)
