= Ger FitzGerald (hurler) =

Irish hurler (1964–2025)

Personal information
- Native name: Gearoid Mac Gearailt (Irish)
- Born: 24 April 1964 Midleton, County Cork, Ireland
- Died: 17 March 2025 (aged 60) Curraheen, County Cork, Ireland
- Occupation: Construction equipment supplier
- Height: 6 ft 1 in (185 cm)

Sport
- Sport: Hurling
- Position: Right corner-forward
Club
| Years | Club | Apps (scores) |
| 1982–1999 | Midleton | 49 (21-88) |
Club titles
- Cork titles: 4
- Munster titles: 2
- All-Ireland Titles: 1
Inter-county
| Years | County | Apps (scores) |
| 1984–1993 | Cork | 22 (11-22) |
Inter-county titles
- Munster titles: 3
- All-Irelands: 2
- NHL: 1
- All Stars: 0

Gerard FitzGerald (24 April 1964 – 17 March 2025) was an Irish hurler who played as a right corner-forward for the Cork senior team.

Born in Midleton, County Cork, Fitzgerald first arrived on the inter-county scene at the age of twenty when he first linked up with the Cork under-21 team. He made his senior debut during the 1983–84 league. Fitzgerald later became a regular member of the starting fifteen and won two All-Ireland medals and three Munster medals. He won a national league medal in 1993. He was an All-Ireland runner-up on one occasion.

As a member of the Munster inter-provincial team on a number of occasions, FitzGerald won a Railway Cup medal in 1992. At club level, he was a one-time All-Ireland medallist with Midleton. In addition to this he also won two Munster medals and four championship medals. Throughout his career FitzGerald made 16 championship appearances. His retirement came following the conclusion of the 1993 championship.

In retirement from playing FitzGerald became involved in team management and coaching. As well as involvement with several club teams he also served as either manager of selector with the Cork minor, under-21 and senior teams. FitzGerald died on 17 March 2025, at the age of 60. Taoiseach Micheál Martin paid tribute.

== Playing career ==
=== Club ===
FitzGerald first came to prominence as a goalkeeper with Midleton at juvenile and underage levels.

After claiming a championship medal in the under-21 grade, FitzGerald was also a key member of the senior team that bridged a forty-five year gap to qualify for the championship decider. The opponents, St Finbarr's, were appearing in their fifth successive decider and were hoping to secure a fourth championship in-a-row. A 1–18 to 2–9 victory gave Midleton their first title since 1916, while FitzGerald collected his first championship medal. He later collected a Munster medal following a 1–14 to 1–11 defeat of Borris-Ileigh in the provincial decider.

Two-in-a-row proved beyond Midleton, while the club also lost the decider to Blackrock in 1985. The following year Midleton were back in the decider with FitzGerald collecting a second championship medal following a 1–18 to 1–10 defeat of Blackrock.

In 1987, Midleton faced Na Piarsaigh in the championship decider. An exciting 2–12 to 0–15 victory gave FitzGerald a third championship medal. He later won a second Munster medal as Cappawhite were accounted for by 1–12 to 1–11 in the provincial decider. On 17 March 1988, Midleton faced Athenry in the All-Ireland decider and a close game developed. Two early goals by Kevin Hennessy and a kicked goal by Colm O'Neill gave Midleton a 3–8 to 0–9 victory and gave FitzGerald an All-Ireland Senior Club Hurling Championship medal.

FitzGerald was captain of the team in 1991 when Midleton reached the championship decider once again. A 1–17 to 1–8 defeat of Glen Rovers gave him his fourth championship medal.

=== Inter-county ===
FitzGerald first played for Cork as a member of the under-21 team on 9 May 1984. He scored a point from full-forward on his debut in a 3–16 to 3–11 Munster semi-final defeat by Tipperary.

After making some appearances for the senior team during the latter stages of the league in 1984, FitzGerald failed to make the championship panel.

FitzGerald was back on the Cork senior team in November 1985. He won an Oireachtas medal that year as Cork defeated Galway by 2–11 to 1–10. He was a regular throughout the subsequent league campaign and was included in Cork's championship team in 1986. Cork made it five-in-a-row in Munster that year as they defeated Clare by 2–18 to 3–12 to take the provincial title, Fitzgerald collected his first winners medal having played in semi final victory over Waterford scoring 2 goals and a pint in that game. Fitzgerald contributed 2goals and 2 pints when cork beat Antrim in the All Ireland semi-final in Croke park. This victory paved the way for an All-Ireland final meeting with Galway on 7 September 1986. The men from the west were the red-hot favourites against a Cork team in decline, however, on the day a different story unfolded. Four Cork goals, one from John Fenton, two from Tomás Mulcahy and one from Kevin Hennessy, stymied the Galway attack and helped the Rebels to a 4–13 to 2–15 victory. It was FitzGerald's first All-Ireland medal.

In 1990, Cork bounced back after a period in decline. He won second Munster medal that year following a 4–16 to 2–14 defeat of Tipperary. The subsequent All-Ireland final on 2 September 1990 pitted Cork against Galway for the second time in four years. Galway were once again the red-hot favourites and justified this tag by going seven points ahead in the opening thirty-five minutes thanks to a masterful display by Joe Cooney. Cork fought back with an equally expert display by captain Tomás Mulcahy. The game was effectively decided on an incident which occurred midway through the second half when Cork goalkeeper Ger Cunningham blocked a point-blank shot from Martin Naughton with his nose. The umpires gave no 65-metre free, even though he clearly deflected it out wide. Cork went on to win a high-scoring and open game of hurling by 5–15 to 2–21. It was a second All-Ireland medal for FitzGerald.

Cork surrendered their All-Ireland crown to Tipperary in 1991, however, FitzGerald was appointed captain of the team in 1992. He later claimed a third Munster medal following a 1–22 to 3–11 of Limerick. On 6 September 1992 Cork faced Kilkenny in the All-Ireland decider. At half-time Cork were two points ahead, however, two second-half goals by John Power and Michael "Titch" Phelan supplemented a first-half D. J. Carey penalty which gave Kilkenny a 3–10 to 1–12 victory.

== Coaching career ==
FitzGerald first became involved in inter-county management when he was appointed manager of the Cork minor team in November 2005. He guided the team to the Munster MHC title in 2006 after a 2–20 to 1–15 win over Tipperary in the final. FitzGerald progressed to the senior team in December 2006, when he was named as a selector as part of Gerald McCarthy's management team. His tenure as a selector coincided with a period of upheaval for the team, culminating with the entire hurling panel going on strike and refusing to play or train under McCarthy. FitzGerald also served as stand in manager on one occasion before the entire management team stepped down in March 2009. He was appointed manager of the Cork under-21 team in August 2009.

At club level, Fitzgerald was appointed manager of Midleton's senior team in 2020. He guided the team to the Cork PSHC title in 2021, after a 0–24 to 1–18 win over Glen Rovers in the final. Fitzgerald stepped down as manager shortly after but remained as part of the management team as a selector.

== Career statistics ==
=== Club ===
| Team | Year | Cork | | Munster | | All-Ireland | | Total | |
| Team | Year | Apps | Score | Apps | Score | Apps | Score | Apps | Score |
|---|---|---|---|---|---|---|---|---|---|
| Midleton | 1983–84 | 4 | 2-07 | 4 | 2-03 | 1 | 0-01 | 9 | 4-11 |
| Midleton | 1984–85 | 2 | 1-03 | — | | — | | 2 | 1-03 |
| Midleton | 1985–86 | 2 | 2-05 | — | | — | | 2 | 2-05 |
| Midleton | 1986–87 | 4 | 5-17 | 1 | 1-05 | — | | 5 | 6-22 |
| Midleton | 1987–88 | 4 | 1-07 | 3 | 3-00 | 2 | 1-02 | 9 | 5-09 |
| Midleton | 1988–89 | 1 | 0-01 | — | | — | | 1 | 0-01 |
| Midleton | 1989–90 | 2 | 0-05 | — | | — | | 2 | 0-05 |
| Midleton | 1990–91 | 2 | 1-02 | — | | — | | 2 | 1-02 |
| Midleton | 1991–92 | 4 | 0-11 | 1 | 0-01 | — | | 5 | 0-12 |
| Midleton | 1992–93 | 1 | 0-03 | — | | — | | 1 | 0-03 |
| Midleton | 1993–94 | 2 | 0-03 | — | | — | | 2 | 0-03 |
| Midleton | 1994–95 | 4 | 1-08 | 2 | 0-02 | — | | 6 | 1-10 |
| Midleton | 1995–96 | 2 | 1-01 | — | | — | | 2 | 1-01 |
| Midleton | 1996–97 | 1 | 0-01 | — | | — | | 1 | 0-01 |
| Career total | | 35 | 14-74 | 11 | 6-11 | 3 | 1-03 | 49 | 21-88 |

=== Inter-county ===
| Team | Year | National League | | | Munster | | All-Ireland | | Total | |
| Team | Year | Division | Apps | Score | Apps | Score | Apps | Score | Apps | Score |
|---|---|---|---|---|---|---|---|---|---|---|
| Cork | 1983–84 | Division 1 | x | 0-00 | — | | — | | x | 0-00 |
| Cork | 1984–85 | Division 1 | x | 0-00 | — | | — | | x | 0-00 |
| Cork | 1985–86 | Division 1 | x | 0-05 | 1 | 2-02 | 2 | 2-02 | x | 4-09 |
| Cork | 1986–87 | Division 1 | x | 0-00 | 3 | 0-01 | — | | x | 0-01 |
| Cork | 1987–88 | Division 1 | x | 0-02 | 2 | 1-04 | — | | x | 1-06 |
| Cork | 1988–89 | Division 2 | x | 4-06 | 0 | 0-00 | — | | x | 4-06 |
| Cork | 1989–90 | Division 1 | x | 6-06 | 3 | 2-05 | 2 | 0-01 | x | 8-12 |
| Cork | 1990–91 | Division 1 | x | 6-07 | 3 | 3-02 | — | | x | 9-09 |
| Cork | 1991–92 | Division 1B | x | 1-03 | 3 | 0-04 | 2 | 1-01 | x | 2-08 |
| Cork | 1992–93 | Division 1B | x | 0-00 | 1 | 0-00 | — | | x | 0-00 |
| Career total | | | x | 17-29 | 16 | 8-18 | 6 | 3-04 | x | 28-51 |

== Honours ==
=== Player ===
St Enda's, Midleton

- East Cork Minor Hurling Championship: 1981, 1982

Midleton

- All-Ireland Senior Club Hurling Championship: 1988
- Munster Senior Club Hurling Championship: 1983, 1988
- Cork Senior Club Hurling Championship: 1983, 1986, 1987, 1991
- East Cork Junior A Hurling Championship: 1982
- Cork Under-21 Hurling Championship: 1983
- East Cork Under-21 Hurling Championship: 1982, 1983, 1984

Cork

- All-Ireland Senior Hurling Championship: 1986, 1990
- Munster Senior Hurling Championship: 1986, 1990, 1992
- National Hurling League: 1992–93

=== Management ===
Midleton

- Cork Senior Club Hurling Championship: 2021

Sporting positions
| Preceded by Tony O'Sullivan | Cork senior hurling team captain 1992 | Succeeded by Brian Corcoran |
