= 1987 Cork Senior Hurling Championship =

Annual hurling competition season

- Dates: 23 May – 25 October 1987
- Teams: 16
- Champions: Midleton (5th title); Ger Power (captain); Paddy FitzGerald (manager)
- Runners-up: Na Piarsaigh; Tony O'Sullivan (captain); Tom Nott (manager)

Tournament statistics
- Matches played: 16
- Goals scored: 44 (2.75 per match)
- Points scored: 375 (23.44 per match)
- Top scorer(s): Mickey Mullins (0-33)

The 1987 Cork Senior Hurling Championship was the 99th staging of the Cork Senior Hurling Championship since its establishment by the Cork County Board in 1887. The championship began on 23 May 1987 and ended on 25 October 1987.

Midleton entered the championship as the defending champions.

The final was played on 25 October 1987 at Páirc Uí Chaoimh in Cork, between Midleton and Na Piarsaigh, in what was their first ever meeting in the final. Midleton won the match by 2–12 to 0–15 to claim their fifth championship title overall and a second title in succession.

Na Piarsaigh's Mickey Mullins was the championship's top scorer with 0-33.

== Seeding ==
Seeding was introduced in the draw for the championship after being advocated by County Secretary Frank Murphy for the previous two years. The system of seeding was introduced to safeguard the financial potential of the championship and to avoid "lop-sided" finals. After some debate, Blackrock, Glen Rovers, Midleton and St. Finbarr's were deemed to be the four strongest clubs and were separated.

== Team changes ==
=== To Championship ===
Promoted from the Cork Intermediate Hurling Championship

- Cloughduv

== Results ==
=== First round ===
23 May 1987 First round	Muskerry	2-10 - 1-10	Carrigdhoun	Páirc Uí Chaoimh
	B O'Donoghue 1-1, M O'Flynn 1-1, G Manley 0-4, J O'Flynn 0-2, P O'Flynn 0-1, D Desmond 0-1.		K Kingston 1-0, J Drinan 0-3, M Fitzpatrick 0-2, D McCarthy 0-2, S McCarthy 0-2, K McCarthy 0-1.	Referee: M O'Flaherty (Blackrock)

24 May 1987 First round	Blackrock	0-22 - 2-08	Imokilly	Páirc Uí Chonaill
	J Cashman 0-4, P Kavanagh 0-4, M Kilcoyne 0-3, E Kavanagh 0-2, P Deasy 0-2, F Delaney 0-2, D Buckley 0-1, T Cashman 0-1, T Deasy 0-1, N O'Leary 0-1, É O'Donoghue 0-1.		T Mulcahy 1-0, P Cahill 1-0, J Lewis 0-3, C Clancy 0-2, J Ryan 0-2, P O'Shea 0-1.	Referee: W Horgan (Blackrock)

24 May 1987 First round	Glen Rovers	4-11 - 0-10	Duhallow	Cloughduv
	J Fitzgibbon 2-2, P Horgan 1-2, K Fitzgibbon 1-0, J Buckley 0-3, R Murphy 0-2, T Mulcahy 0-1, C Ring 0-1.		T Burke 0-4, D Sheehan 0-4, N Brosnan 0-1, T Brosnan 0-1.	Referee: M Keane

24 May 1987 First round	Midleton	4-20 - 0-08	Seandún	Caherlag
	J Hartnett 2-2, M Mahoney 1-2, J Boylan 0-5, K Coakley 1-1, J Fenton 0-4, G Fitzgerald 0-3, T McCarthy 0-1, S O'Brien 0-1, K Hennessy 0-1.		C Coffey 0-2, E Healy 0-2, A O'Sullivan 0-2, M Lordan 0-1, P Burns 0-1.	Referee: M Beecher (Ballyhooley)

24 May 1987 First round	Avondhu	0-13 - 0-13	Milford	Gaels Memorial Grounds
	C O'Callaghan 0-5, D Murphy 0-2, D Relihan 0-2, J Sheehan 0-1, D Coughlan 0-1, T O'Callaghan 0-1, G Buckley 0-1.		P Buckley 0-8, N Fitzgibbon 0-3, V Sheehan 0-2.	Referee: R Murphy (Lyre)

24 May 1987 First round	St. Finbarr's	0-13 - 0-10	Ballyhea	Páirc Mac Gearailt
	J Cremin 0-5, C Ryan 0-2, T Finn 0-2, J Allen 0-2, K Nagle 0-1, J Meyler 0-1.		J Grogan 0-5, G O'Connor 0-1, D Ryan 0-1, D O'Flynn 0-1, M O'Callaghan 0-1, W Shanahan 0-1.	Referee: P Spillane (Carrigtwohill)

24 May 1987 First round	Sarsfields	4-10 - 0-09	Carbery	Cloughduv
	G McEvoy 2-2, B Óg Murphy 1-2, T McAuliffe 1-1, T McCarthy 0-3, John Barry 0-2.		P Crowley 0-6, T Brennan 0-1, N Cahalane 0-1, F Sheehy 0-1.	Referee: J O'Leary

24 May 1987 First round	Na Piarsaigh	4-11 - 3-06	Cloughduv	Ovens
	M Kearney 2-0, L Forde 1-2, M Mullins 0-4, J O'Sullivan 1-0, T O'Sullivan 0-2, P O'Connor 0-2, D Murphy 0-1.		D O'Leary 1-5, J Grainger 1-1, T Barry-Murphy 1-0.	Referee: M O'Flaherty (Blackrock)

7 June 1987 First round replay	Avondhu	1-14 - 2-10	Milford	Gaels Memorial Grounds
	D Coughlan 1-1, C O'Callaghan 0-4, R Sheehan 0-3, D Relihan 0-2, D Herlihy 0-2, J Sheehan 0-1, PJ Stokes 0-1.		P Buckley 1-5, J Fitzgibbon 1-0, S O'Gorman 0-3, M Fitzgibbon 0-1, N Fitzgibbon 0-1.	Referee: R Murphy (Lyre)

=== Quarter-finals ===
31 May 1987 Quarter-final	Glen Rovers	2-17 - 1-07	Muskerry	Páirc Uí Chaoimh
	J Fitzgibbon 1-3, T Mulcahy 0-4, P Horgan 0-4, K Dorgan 1-0, R Murphy 0-3, J Buckley 0-2, K Fitzgibbon 0-1.		J Feeeney 1-1, D Desmond 0-4, G Manley 0-2.

31 May 1987 Quarter-final	St. Finbarr's	2-09 - 0-13	Sarsfields	Páirc Uí Chaoimh
	J Allen 1-1, J Cremin 0-4, T Finn 1-0, K Nagle 0-1, B O'Connell 0-1, M Barry 0-1, F Ramsey 0-1.		T McCarthy 0-5, G McEvoy 0-2, B Óg Murphy 0-2, J Barry 0-1, D Kenneally 0-1, B Lotty 0-1, M Carroll 0-1.	Referee: F Murphy (Blackrock)

19 June 1987 Quarter-final	Na Piarsaigh	1-17 - 2-09	Blackrock	Páirc Uí Chaoimh
	M Mullins 0-10, D Murphy 1-2, T O'Sullivan 0-2, D Daly 0-2, M O'Sullivan 0-1.		F Delaney 2-5, O Kavanagh 0-1, M Kilcoyne 0-1, D Buckley 0-1, J Cashman 0-1.	Referee: P Spillane (Carrigtwohill)

1 August 1987 Quarter-final	Midleton	2-11 - 1-10	Avondhu	Páirc Mac Gearailt
	K Hennessy 1-3, G Fitzgerald 1-1, J Fenton 0-3, M O'Mahony 0-2, T McCarthy 0-2.		G Buckley 1-3, D Herlihy 0-2, J Sheehan 0-1, D Murphy 0-1, T Cooney 0-1, C O'Callaghan 0-1, D Coughlan 0-1.	Referee: F Murphy (Blackrock)

=== Semi-finals ===
13 September 1987 Semi-final	Na Piarsaigh	0-18 - 0-12	Glen Rovers	Páirc Uí Chaoimh
	M Mullins 0-11, J O'Sullivan 0-2, R McDonnell 0-2, T O'Sullivan 0-1, D Murphy 0-1, D Daly 0-1.		C Ring 0-6, P Horgan 0-5, J Buckley 0-1.	Referee: F Murphy (Blackrock)

11 October 1987 Semi-final	Midleton	2-09 - 2-08	St. Finbarr's	Páirc Uí Chaoimh
	J Fenton 1-2, J Boylan 1-1, G Fitzgerald 0-2, K Hennessy 0-2, T McCarthy 0-1, M O'Mahony 0-1.		M Barry 2-0, J Tobin 0-5, J Griffen 0-2, C Ryan 0-1.	Referee: W Horgan (Brian Dillons)

=== Final ===
25 October 1987 Final	Midleton	2-12 - 0-15	Na Piarsaigh	Páirc Uí Chaoimh
	J Fenton 1-9, K Hennessy 1-0, G Fitzgerald 0-1, M O'Mahony 0-1, V O'Neill 0-1.		M Mullins 0-8, R McDonnell 0-3, T O'Sullivan 0-1, P O'Connor 0-1, L Forde 0-1, C O'Fonovan 0-1.

== Championship statistics ==
=== Top scorers ===
Top scorers overall

Rank	Player	Club	Tally	Total	Matches	Average
1	Mickey Mullins	Na Piarsaigh	0-33	33	4	8.25
2	John Fenton	Midleton	2-18	24	4	6.00
3	John Fitzgibbon	Glen Rovers	4-05	17	3	5.66
4	Pat Buckley	Milford	1-13	16	2	8.00
5	Pat Horgan	Glen Rovers	1-11	14	3	4.66
6	Finbarr Delaney	Blackrock	2-07	13	2	6.50
7	Kevin Hennessy	Midleton	2-06	12	4	3.00
8	Ger McEvoy	Sarsfields	2-04	10	2	5.00
8	Ger FitzGerald	Midleton	1-07	10	4	2.50

Top scorers in a single game

Rank	Player	Club	Tally	Total	Opposition
1	John Fenton	Midleton	1-09	12	Na Piarsaigh
2	Finbarr Delaney	Blackrock	2-05	11	Na Piarsaigh
2	Mickey Mullins	Na Piarsaigh	0-11	11	Glen Rovers
4	Mickey Mullins	Na Piarsaigh	0-10	10	Blackrock
5	John Fitzgibbon	Glen Rovers	2-02	8	Duhallow
5	John Hartnett	Midleton	2-02	8	Seandún
5	Ger McEvoy	Sarsfields	2-02	8	Carbery
5	Donald O'Leary	Cloughduv	1-05	8	Na Piarsaigh
5	Pat Buckley	Milford	1-05	8	Avondhu
5	Mickey Mullins	Na Piarsaigh	0-08	8	Midleton
5	Pat Buckley	Milford	0-08	8	Avondhu
