= 1978 All-Ireland Minor Hurling Championship =

All-Ireland Minor Hurling Championship 1978
All Ireland Champions
- Winners: Cork (13th win)
- Captain: Pat Murphy

All Ireland Runners-up
- Runners-up: Kilkenny
- Captain: Pierce Phelan

Provincial Champions
- Munster: Cork
- Leinster: Kilkenny
- Ulster: Not Played
- Connacht: Not Played

The 1978 All-Ireland Minor Hurling Championship was the 48th staging of the All-Ireland Minor Hurling Championship since its establishment by the Gaelic Athletic Association in 1928.

Kilkenny entered the championship as the defending champions.

On 3 September 1978 Cork won the championship following a 1-15 to 1-8 defeat of Kilkenny in the All-Ireland final. This was their 13th All-Ireland title and their first in four championship seasons.

== Results ==
=== Munster Minor Hurling Championship ===
Final

30 July 1978 Final	Tipperary	3-6 - 1-14	Cork	Semple Stadium, Thurles
			D Murphy 1-4, J Hartnett 0-7, S O'Gorman 0-1, T McCarthy 0-1, J Ahearne 0-1.

=== All-Ireland Minor Hurling Championship ===
Semi-final

6 August 1978 Semi-final	Kilkenny	3-13 - 1-8	Galway	Croke Park, Dublin
	B McEvoy 1-8, W Purcell 1-2, J Holland 1-0, P Gannon 0-1, J Moriarty 0-1, E Crowley 0-1.		P Hurney 1-1, S Dolan 0-4, M Ruane 0-1, M McCormack 0-1, M Fahy 0-1.	Referee: G Ryan (Tipperary)

Final

3 September 1978 Final	Cork	1-15 - 1-8	Kilkenny	Croke Park, Dublin
	S O'Gorman 1-2, G O'Regan 0-4, S Cashman 0-2, D Murphy 0-2, L Lynch 0-2, J Hartnett 0-2, T McCarthy 0-1.		E Crowley 1-1, P Gannon 0-2, B McEvoy 0-2, M Heffernan 0-1, W Purcell 0-1, M Cleere 0-1.	Attendance: 64,155; Referee: JJ Landers (Waterford)
