= 1988 All-Ireland Senior Club Hurling Championship final =

1988 All-Ireland Senior Club Hurling Championship Final
- Event: 1987–88 All-Ireland Senior Club Hurling Championship
Midleton	Athenry
3-8	0-9
- Date: 17 March 1988
- Venue: Croke Park, Dublin
- Referee: Gerry Kirwan (Offaly)
- Attendance: 3,000

The 1988 All-Ireland Senior Club Hurling Championship final was a hurling match played at Croke Park on 17 March 1988 to determine the winners of the 1987–88 All-Ireland Senior Club Hurling Championship, the 18th season of the All-Ireland Senior Club Hurling Championship, a tournament organised by the Gaelic Athletic Association for the champion clubs of the four provinces of Ireland. The final was contested by Midleton of Cork and Athenry of Galway, with Midleton winning by 3–8 to 0–9.

In the first and only championship meeting between the two sides, Athenry gave as good as they got for long periods of the first half. In a tactical move Midleton's Kevin Hennessy was given a roving brief along with Colm O'Neill and this gave the Cork star the space to strike for goals in 12th and 14th minutes. In spite of being stung for two goals, his marker, Dermot Monaghan, could not be faulted for either goals, and was viewed as Athenry's man-of-the-match. Despite the goals Athenry began to reassert themselves thanks to Pat Higgins around midfield and P. J. Molloy's accuracy up front. He sent over five of his side's six first half points as Midleton led at the break by 2–5 to 0–6.

Athenry recorded early scores in the second half, with points from John Hardiman and Pat Higgins. Ger Power saved subsequent attempts from Higgins and Mixie Donoghue.

Athenry had limited scoring opportunities from play during this period. By the 48th minute, the score stood at 2–6 to 0–8. P. J. Molloy had two 21-yard frees saved by Power.

Midleton's victory secured their first and only All-Ireland title. They become the 12th club to win the All-Ireland title, while they are the fourth Cork representatives to claim the ultimate prize.

== Match ==
=== Details ===
17 March 1988

Midleton	3-8 - 0-9	Athenry
K Hennessy 2-3, C O'Neill 1-1, J Fenton 0-2 (1f), G Fitzgerald 0-1, T McCarthy 0-1.		PJ Molloy 0-6 (2f and 1 sideline), J Hardiman 0-1, S Keana 0-1, P Healy 0-1.

Croke Park, Dublin
Attendance: 6,000
Referee: G Kirwan (Offaly)

Midelton	Athenry
