= 1984 Cork Intermediate Football Championship =

Gaelic football competition

- Dates: 22 April - 16 September 1984
- Teams: 21
- Champions: Midleton (1st title); Dave Crotty (captain)
- Runners-up: O'Donovan Rossa; Mattie Cahalane (captain)

Tournament statistics
- Matches played: 21
- Goals scored: 46 (2.19 per match)
- Points scored: 362 (17.24 per match)
- Top scorer(s): Mick McCarthy (1-34)

The 1984 Cork Intermediate Football Championship was the 49th staging of the Cork Intermediate Football Championship since its establishment by the Cork County Board in 1909. The draw for the opening round fixtures took place on 29 January 1984. The championship ran from 22 April to 16 September 1984.

The final was played on 16 September 1984 at the Ballinspittle Grounds, between Midleton and O'Donovan Rossa, in what was their first ever meeting in the final. Midleton won the match by 2-11 to 1-12 to claim their first ever championship title.

O'Donovan Rossa's Mick McCarthy was the championship's top scorer with 1-34.

== Results ==
=== First round ===
22 April 1984 First round	Glanworth	1-05 - 1-11	Douglas	Páirc Lios gCúl
	J Murphy 1-0, P Quirke 0-2, J O'Brien 0-2, P O'Brien 0-1.		C Kavanagh 0-6, P Walsh 1-1, D Kennedy 0-2, P Lynch 0-1, E Ford 0-1.

22 April 1984 First round	Bandon	2-08 - 3-13	Midleton	Church Road
	O Kelly 1-1, J Gabriel 1-1, J Fitzgerald 0-2, P Crowley 0-2, N Crowley 0-2.		C O'Neill 1-4, V O'Neill 1-0, J Boylan 1-0, G Fitzgerald 0-3, E O'Leary 0-3, K Coakley 0-2, T McCarthy 0-1.

22 April 1984 First round	St. Finbarr's	1-06 - 1-06	Castletownbere	Aughaville Grounds
	L Walsh 1-0, M Murphy 0-2, M Carey 0-2, T Power 0-1, E Haines 0-1.		J Murphy 1-1, C Collins 0-2, M O'Sullivan 0-2, O O'Sullivan 0-1.

29 April 1984 First round replay	St. Finbarr's	1-08 - 0-04	Castletownbere	Aughaville Grounds
	V Twomey 1-0, T Power 0-3, K Scanlon 0-2, E Haines 0-2, M Murphy 0-1.		M O'Sullivan 0-2, D O'Driscoll 0-1, J Murphy 0-1.

=== Second round ===
22 April 1984 Second round	Donoughmore	1-08 - 0-12	Doneraile	O'Connell Park
	J Barrett 1-1, G O'Rourke 0-4, J O'Sullivan 0-2, S O'Regan 0-1.		P Nelligan 0-3, T Mannix 0-3, P Harrington 0-2, T Cole 0-2, K Stack 0-1, C Hannon 0-1.

22 April 1984 Second round	Dohenys	1-08 - 1-06	Mitchelstown	Ballinhassig Grounds
	Barry Herlihy 0-5, Brian Herlihy 1-1, K Sheehan 0-1, C O'Rourke 0-1.		A Browne 1-0, G Mulcahy 0-2, D O'Sullivan 0-2, M Shinnick 0-1, M Noonan 0-1.

22 April 1984 Second round	Kildorrery	0-05 - 3-11	O'Donovan Rossa	Ballinhassig Grounds
	A O'Connor 0-3, J O'Connor 0-1, B O'Connor 0-1.		M McCarthy 1-8, J Evans 1-1, H Thornhill 1-0, M Burns 0-2.

22 April 1984 Second round	Grange	3-14 - 0-04	St. Vincent's	Bride Rovers Park
	N Kirby 1-4, J Roche 1-2, T O'Rourke 1-1, B O'Neill 0-3, F Grourke 0-2, M McCarthy 0-2.		P O'Regan 0-3, R O'Donovan 0-1.

22 April 1984 Second round	Glanmire	2-06 - 2-06	Fermoy	Bride Rovers Park
	D Crowley 1-1, B Lotty 1-0, P Barry 0-2, J Barry 0-1, J Ryan 0-1, N Heffernan 0-1.		E Hickey 2-0, B Shinnick 0-4, M Dennehy 0-1, P Dennehy 0-1.

22 April 1984 Second round	Nemo Rangers	1-08 - 0-12	Ballincollig	Bishopstown Grounds
	C Whelan 1-4, D Daly 0-1, D O'Driscoll 0-1, D Lenihan 0-1, N Maxwell 0-1.		F Daly 0-5, T O'Reilly 0-3, B McCarthy 0-2, G Ring 0-1, D O'Driscoll 0-1.

2 May 1984 Second round replay	Glanmire	1-10 - 2-04	Fermoy	Bride Rovers Park
	T Murphy 1-1, N Heffernan 0-4, Brian Lotty 0-3, B Óg Murphy 0-1, Brendan Lotty 0-1.		J Carey 1-2, J Lonergan 1-0, B Shinnick 0-2.

27 May 1984 Second round	St. Finbarr's	1-07 - 0-08	Mayfield	Church Road
	J O'Callaghan 1-4, T Power 0-2, M Murphy 0-1.		F Mulvihill 0-2, D Kennedy 0-2, F Kelleher 0-1, J Neville 0-1, S Long 0-1, K Hyland 0-1.

10 June 1984 Second round	Douglas	1-04 - 1-09	Midleton	Caherlag Grounds
	C Kavanagh 1-0, M O'Regan 0-1, E Forde 0-1, P Walsh 0-1, J Murphy 0-1.		T McCarthy 1-1, C O'Neill 0-3, G Fitzgerald 0-2, G Glavin 0-2, E Cleary 0-1.

=== Quarter-finals ===
15 June 1984 Quarter-final	Midleton	1-14 - 0-11	St. Finbarr's	Carrigtwohill Grounds
	C O'Neill 0-8, J Boylan 1-0, G Fitzgerald 0-3, T McCarthy 0-2, G Glavin 0-1.		J O'Callaghan 0-4, T Power 0-3, M Lynch 0-1, D Kelleher 0-1, K Scannell 0-1, E Haynes 0-1.

17 June 1984 Quarter-final	Dohenys	2-11 - 2-05	Grange	Innishannon Grounds
	C O'Rourke 1-2, R Kelleher 1-1, D Herlihy 0-4, B Herlihy 0-4.		B O'Neill 1-1, M McCarthy 1-0, J Roche 0-3, N McCarthy 0-1.

8 July 1984 Quarter-final	Doneraile	2-13 - 2-07	Glanmire	Bride Rovers Park
	P Nelligan 1-1, D Cahill 1-1, P Harrington 0-4, T Cole 0-2, K Stack 0-2, N Landy 0-2, T Mannix 0-1.		T McCarthy 1-1, Brendan Lotty 1-1, N Heffernan 0-3, T Murphy 0-2.

14 July 1984 Quarter-final	O'Donovan Rossa	1-08 - 1-08	Ballincollig	Inchigeelagh Grounds
	M Burns 1-2, M McCarthy 0-5, A Davis 0-1.		T O'Reilly 0-5, D O'Driscoll 1-0, T Gabriel 0-2, C O'Connell 0-1.

21 July 1984 Quarter-final replay	O'Donovan Rossa	0-11 - 1-07	Ballincollig	Inchigeelagh Grounds
	M McCarthy 0-6, I Breen 0-2, J Evans 0-1, N Cleary 0-1, D Walsh 0-1.		T Goulding 1-0, T O'Reilly 0-3, F Daly 0-2, P Coomey 0-1, G Gabriel 0-1.

=== Semi-finals ===
19 August 1984 Semi-final	Midleton	0-15 - 1-06	Dohenys	Minane Bridge Grounds
	C O'Neill 0-5, K Hennessy 0-3, G Fitzgerald 0-2, P Hartnett 0-2, G Glavin 0-1, J Fenton 0-1, T McCarthy 0-1.		B Herlihy 1-3, R Kelleher 0-1, T Ross 0-1, D Herlihy 0-1.	Referee: D Collins (Kinsale)

19 August 1984 Semi-final	O'Donovan Rossa	0-12 - 0-08	Doneraile	Páirc Uí Chaoimh
	M McCarthy 0-8, M Burns 0-1, N Cleary 0-1, M Hodnett 0-1, A Davis 0-1.		T Mannix 0-2, P Harrington 0-2, T Cole 0-1, P Nelligan 0-1, K Stack 0-1, J Landy 0-1.	Referee: D O'Connor

=== Final ===
16 September 1984 Final	Midleton	2-11 - 1-12	O'Donovan Rossa	Ballinspittle Grounds
	S O'Brien 1-2, G Fitzgerald 1-1, C O'Neill 0-2, T McCarthy 0-2, J Boylan 0-1, J Fenton 0-1, K Coakley 0-1, G Glavin 0-1.		M McCarthy 0-7, I Breen 1-1, J Evans 0-1, F Kearney 0-1, D Walsh 0-1, C O'Regan 0-1.	Referee: D Collins (Kinsale)

== Championship statistics ==
=== Top scorers ===
Overall

Rank	Player	Club	Tally	Total	Matches	Average
1	Mick McCarthy	O'Donovan Rossa	1-34	37	5	7.40
2	Colm O'Neill	Midleton	1-22	25	5	5.00
3	Barry Herlihy	Dohenys	1-12	15	3	5.00
4	Ger FitzGerald	Midleton	1-11	14	5	2.80
5	James O'Callaghan	St. Finbarr's	1-08	11	2	5.50

In a single game

Rank	Player	Club	Tally	Total	Opposition
1	Mick McCarthy	O'Donovan Rossa	1-08	11	Kildorrery
2	Mick McCarthy	O'Donovan Rossa	0-08	8	Doneraile
2	Colm O'Neill	Midleton	0-08	8	St. Finbarr's
4	Colm O'Neill	Midleton	1-04	7	Bandon
4	Ned Kirby	Grange	1-04	7	St. Vincent's
4	Clem Whelan	Nemo Rangers	1-04	7	Ballincollig
4	James O'Callaghan	St. Finbarr's	1-04	7	Mayfield
4	Mick McCarthy	O'Donovan Rossa	0-07	7	Midleton
10	Éamonn Hickey	Fermoy	2-00	6	Glanmire
10	Barry Herlihy	Dohenys	1-03	6	Midleton
10	Cyril Kavanagh	Douglas	0-06	6	Glanworth
10	Mick McCarthy	O'Donovan Rossa	0-06	6	Ballincollig
