= 1986 Cork Senior Hurling Championship =

Annual hurling competition season

- Dates: 2 May – 5 October 1986
- Teams: 16
- Champions: Midleton (4th title); Kevin Hennessy (captain); Paddy FitzGerald (manager)
- Runners-up: Blackrock; Andy Creagh (captain); Tim Murphy (manager)

Tournament statistics
- Matches played: 15
- Goals scored: 58 (3.87 per match)
- Points scored: 356 (23.73 per match)
- Top scorer(s): Ger Fitzgerald (5-17)

The 1986 Cork Senior Hurling Championship was the 98th staging of the Cork Senior Hurling Championship since its establishment by the Cork County Board in 1887. The championship began on 2 May 1986 and ended on 5 October 1986.

Blackrock entered the championship as the defending champions.

The final was played on 5 October 1986 at Páirc Uí Chaoimh in Cork, between Midleton and Blackrock, in what was their second successive meeting in the final. Midleton won the match by 1–18 to 1–10 to claim their fourth championship title overall and a first title in three years.

Midleton's Ger Fitzgerald was the championship's top scorer with 5–17.

== Team changes ==
=== From Championship ===
Regraded to the Cork Intermediate Hurling Championship

- Erin's Own

Declined to field a team

- University College Cork

== Results ==
=== First round ===
| 2 May 1986 First round | Avondhu | 2-03 - 2-09 | Imokilly | Páirc Mac Gearailt, Fermoy |
| | D Coughlan 2-0, J Keane 0-3. | | T Fitzgibbon 2-1, C Clancy 0-4, G Morgan 0-1, T Mulcahy 0-1, J Lewis 0-1, J Halbert 0-1. | Referee: P Cronin (St. Finbarr's) |

| 4 May 1986 First round | Carrigdhoun | 2-10 - 1-12 | Seandún | Manning Park, Passage |
| | M Fitzpatrick 0-5, D Kiely 1-1, L Kelly 1-0, S McCarthy 0-2, J Dineen 0-1, DJ Kiely 0-1. | | C Coffey 0-7, J Deane 1-0, J O'Neill 0-2, K Cotter 0-1, S O'Donovan 0-1, T Harrington 0-1. | Referee: B Meaney (Sarsfields) |

| 4 May 1986 First round | Ballyhea | 1-19 - 2-08 | Youghal | Páirc Mac Gearailt, Fermoy |
| | J Grogan 1-4, A Morrissey 0-4, G O'Connor 0-3, J O'Callaghan 0-2, L O'Connor 0-2, D Ryan 0-2, C Brassill 0-1, M O'Callaghan 0-1. | | T Coyne 1-5, G Cotter 1-1, G Motherway 0-1, J Kennedy 0-1. | Referee: W Horgan (Brian Dillons) |

| 4 May 1986 First round | St. Finbarr's | 3-12 - 1-05 | Carbery | Cloughduv |
| | J Barry-Murphy 2-1, J Tobin 1-1, D Walsh 0-3, T Finn 0-3, C Ryan 0-3, J Meyler 0-1. | | P Crowley 1-0, T Crowley 0-3, M Holland 0-1, M O'Mahony 0-1. | Referee: R Murphy (Lyre) |

| 4 May 1986 First round | Duhallow | 0-10 - 4-11 | Glen Rovers | Cloughduv |
| | D Keane 0-4, J O'Connor 0-3, D Sheehan 0-1, E Geaney 0-1, J Noonan 0-1. | | J Fitzgibbon 3-1, P Barry 1-1, T Mulcahy 0-3, C McGuckian 0-2, P Horgan 0-2, E McGrath 0-1, K Fitzgibbon 0-1. | Referee: M Keane (Cloughduv) |

| 4 May 1986 First round | Na Piarsaigh | 0-12 - 0-13 | Blackrock | Páirc Uí Chaoimh, Cork |
| | M Mullins 0-4, M O'Sullivan 0-2, D Murphy 0-2, T O'Sullivan 0-2, P O'Connor 0-1, J O'Sullivan 0-1. | | F Delaney 0-5, P Kavanagh 0-2, M Kilcoyne 0-2, T Cashman 0-1, J Cashman 0-1, D Buckley 0-1, C Heffernan 0-1. | Referee: J Motherway (Aghada) |

| 4 May 1986 First round | Muskerry | 1-08 - 2-17 | Midleton | Páirc Uí Chaoimh, Cork |
| | M O'Flynn 1-1, M O'Donoghue 0-3, J O'Leary 0-2, M Healy 0-2. | | G Fitzgerald 2-5, T McCarthy 0-6, K Hennessy 0-3, S O'Brien 0-2, J Hartnett 0-1. | Referee: M O'Flaherty (Blackrock) |

| 11 May 1986 First round | Milford | 6-09 - 2-11 | Sarsfields | Moore Park, Kilworth |
| | T Buckley 2-1, V Sheehan 2-1, M Fitzgibbon 1-4, S Sheehan 1-0, J Fitzgibbon 0-1, N Fitzgibbon 0-1, J O'Gorman 0-1. | | T Murphy 1-3, B Óg Murphy 0-5, J Barry 1-0, T McCarthy 0-3. | Referee: M O'Flaherty (Blackrock) |

=== Quarter-finals ===
| 1 June 1986 Quarter-final | Midleton | 4-16 - 2-13 | St. Finbarr's | Páirc Uí Chaoimh, Cork |
| | J Fenton 2-2, G Fitzgerald 1-5, G Glavin 1-1, C O'Neill 0-3, D Boylan 0-2, K Hennessy 0-2, T McCarthy 0-1. | | D Walsh 0-8, J Barry-Murphy 1-2, V Twomey 1-0, J Tobin 0-1, G Cunningham 0-1, N Kennefick 0-1. | Referee: F Murphy (Blackrock) |

| 1 June 1986 Quarter-final | Ballyhea | 1-21 - 3-13 | Milford | Mannix Park, Charleville |
| | J Grogan 1-11, M O'Callaghan 0-3, G O'Connor 0-2, P O'Halloran 0-1, W Shanahan 0-1, A Morrissey 0-1, D Ryan 0-1, P Ryan 0-1. | | M Fitzgibbon 0-10, V Sheehan 1-1, S O'Gorman 1-1, J O'Gorman 1-0, P Buckley 0-1. | Referee: F Murphy (Ballyhea) |

| 14 June 1986 Quarter-final | Blackrock | 1-19 - 2-09 | Glen Rovers | Páirc Uí Chaoimh, Cork |
| | F Delaney 1-3, F Collins 0-4, M Kilcoyne 0-3, P Deasy 0-3, E Kavanagh 0-2, É O'Donoghue 0-1, J Cashman 0-1, C Heffernan 0-1, T Cashman 0-1. | | P Horgan 1-2, T Mulcahy 1-1, D Whitley 0-3, J Buckley 0-2, P Barry 0-1. | Referee: M Keane (Cloughduv) |

| 14 June 1986 Quarter-final | Carrigdhoun | 3-11 - 5-04 | Imokilly | Church Road, Blackrock |
| | K Kingston 1-2, A O'Driscoll 1-2, L Kelly 1-1, M Fitzpatrick 0-4, D Kiely 0-2. | | T Mulcahy 2-2, C Clancy 2-0, M Treacy 1-1, C Casey 0-1. | Referee: W Horgan (Brian Dillons) |

=== Semi-finals ===
| 17 August 1986 Semi-final | Blackrock | 3-11 - 1-13 | Ballyhea | Páirc Mac Gearailt |
| | F Delaney 2-7, P Deasy 1-0, J Cashman 0-1, M Kilcoyne 0-1, O Kavanagh 0-1, É O'Donoghue 0-1. | | A Morrissey 1-1, J Grogan 0-2, J O'Callaghan 0-2, G O'Connor 0-2, P Ryan 0-1, C Brassill 0-1, M O'Callaghan 0-1, W Shanahan 0-1, P O'Halloran 0-1, D Ryan 0-1. | Referee: J Motherway (Aghada) |

| 17 August 1986 Semi-final | Midleton | 3-14 - 1-15 | Carrigdhoun | Páirc Uí Chaoimh, Cork |
| | J Fenton 1-5, G Fitzgerald 2-1, S O'Brien 0-3, G Glavin 0-2, D Boylan 0-2, J Hartnett 0-1. | | A O'Driscoll 1-2, S McCarthy 0-6, K Kingston 0-4, D McCarthy 0-1, M Fitzpatrick 0-1, J O'Mahony 0-1. | Referee: W Horgan (Brian Dillons) |

=== Final ===
| 5 October 1986 Final | Midleton | 1-18 - 1-10 | Blackrock | Páirc Uí Chaoimh, Cork |
| | G Fitzgerald 0-6, J Boylan 1-1, J Hartnett 0-3, S O'Brien 0-4, K Hennessy 0-2, D Boylan 0-1, T McCarthy 0-1. | | F Delaney 1-4, É O'Donoghue 0-2, J Evans 0-1, T Cashman 0-1, J Cashman 0-1, E Kavanagh 0-1. | Referee: M Keane (Cloughduv) |

== Championship statistics ==
=== Top scorers ===
Top scorers overall

| Rank | Player | Club | Tally | Total | Matches | Average |
|---|---|---|---|---|---|---|
| 1 | Ger Fitzgerald | Midleton | 5-17 | 32 | 4 | 8.00 |
| 2 | Finbarr Delaney | Blackrock | 4-19 | 31 | 4 | 7.75 |
| 3 | John Grogan | Ballyhea | 2-17 | 23 | 3 | 7.66 |
| 4 | Mossie Fitzgibbon | Milford | 1-14 | 17 | 2 | 8.50 |
| 5 | John Fenton | Midleton | 3-07 | 16 | 2 | 8.00 |
| 6 | Jimmy Barry-Murphy | St. Finbarr's | 3-03 | 12 | 2 | 6.00 |
| 7 | Vincent Sheehan | Milford | 3-02 | 11 | 2 | 5.50 |
| 7 | Denis Walsh | St. Finbarr's | 0-11 | 11 | 2 | 5.50 |
| 9 | John Fitzgibbon | Glen Rovers | 3-01 | 10 | 1 | 10.00 |
| 9 | Christy Clancy | Imokilly | 2-04 | 10 | 2 | 5.00 |
| 9 | Adrian O'Driscoll | Carrigdhoun | 2-04 | 10 | 3 | 3.33 |
| 9 | Martin Fitzpatrick | Carrigdhoun | 0-10 | 10 | 3 | 3.33 |

Top scorers in a single game

| Rank | Player | Club | Tally | Total | Opposition |
|---|---|---|---|---|---|
| 1 | John Grogan | Ballyhea | 1-11 | 14 | Milford |
| 2 | Finbarr Delaney | Blackrock | 2-07 | 13 | Ballyhea |
| 3 | Ger FitzGerald | Midleton | 2-05 | 11 | Muskerry |
| 4 | John Fitzgibbon | Glen Rovers | 3-01 | 10 | Duhallow |
| 4 | Mossie Fitzgibbon | Milford | 0-10 | 10 | Ballyhea |
| 6 | Thomas Mulcahy | Imokilly | 2-02 | 8 | Carrigdhoun |
| 6 | John Fenton | Midleton | 2-02 | 8 | St. Finbarr's |
| 6 | Tony Coyne | Youghal | 1-05 | 8 | Ballyhea |
| 6 | Ger Fitzgerald | Midleton | 1-05 | 8 | St. Finbarr's |
| 6 | John Fenton | Midleton | 1-05 | 8 | Carrigdhoun |
| 6 | Denis Walsh | St. Finbarr's | 0-08 | 8 | Midleton |
