= Finbarr Delaney =

Irish former sportsperson

Personal information
- Native name: Fionnbarra Ó Dúláinne (Irish)
- Born: 1956 (age 69–70) Blackrock, County Cork

Sport
- Sport: Hurling
- Position: Left corner-forward
Club
- Years: Club
- 1970s-1990s: Blackrock
Club titles
- Cork titles: 1
- Munster titles: 1
- All-Ireland Titles: 0
Inter-county
Years	County	Apps (scores)
1989	Cork	2 (1-19)
Inter-county titles
- Munster titles: 0
- All-Irelands: 0
- NHL: 0
- All Stars: 0

Finbarr Delaney (born 1956 in Blackrock, County Cork) is an Irish former sportsperson. He played hurling with his local club Blackrock and was a member of the Cork senior inter-county team for one season in 1989.
