= John Fenton (hurler) =

Irish hurler

Personal information
- Native name: Seán Ó Fionnachta (Irish)
- Born: 11 December 1955 (age 70) Midleton, County Cork, Ireland
- Occupation: Sales rep
- Height: 5 ft 10 in (178 cm)

Sport
- Sport: Hurling
- Position: Midfield
Club
- Years: Club
- 1972-1991: Midleton
Club titles
- Cork titles: 3
- Munster titles: 2
- All-Ireland Titles: 1
Inter-county*
| Years | County | Apps (scores) |
| 1975–1987 | Cork | 31 (8–132) |
Inter-county titles
- Munster titles: 7
- All-Irelands: 2
- All Stars: 5
- *Inter County team apps and scores correct as of 12:47, 17 May 2015.

John Fenton (born 11 December 1955) is an Irish retired hurler who played as a midfielder and forward for the Cork senior team.

Born in Midleton, County Cork, Fenton first played competitive hurling during his schooling at Midleton CBS. He arrived on the inter-county scene at the age of seventeen when he first linked up with the Cork minor team, before later joining the under-21 side. He made his senior debut during the 1975 championship. Fenton subsequently became a regular member of the starting fifteen and won two All-Ireland medals, seven Munster medals and two National Hurling League medals. The All-Ireland-winning captain of 1984, he was an All-Ireland runner-up on one occasion.

As a member of the Munster inter-provincial team on a number of occasions, Fenton won three Railway Cup medals. At club level he is a one-time All-Ireland medallist with Midleton. In addition to this he has also won two Munster medals and three championship medals.

Throughout his career Fenton made 31 championship appearances. His retirement came following the conclusion of the 1987 championship.

Fenton is widely regarded as one of the greatest hurlers of his era. During his playing days he won five consecutive All-Star awards. In a 2009 poll Fenton was chosen as one of the 125 greatest hurlers of all-time.

== Playing career ==
=== Club ===
Fenton first came to prominence with Midleton when he was thirteen years-old as a member of the club's minor team. He began his playing career as a goalkeeper before later being deployed at midfield.

In 1978 he enjoyed his first major success when he captured a championship medal in the intermediate grade as Midleton defeated Newtownshandrum by 1-12 to 1-10.

Five years later Fenton was captain of the Midleton senior team that bridged a forty-five year gap to qualify for the championship decider. The opponents, St. Finbarr's, were appearing in their fifth successive decider and were hoping to secure fourth championship in-a-row. A 1-18 to 2-9 victory gave Midleton their first title since 1916, while Fenton, who collected his first championship medal, also had the honour of lifting the cup. He later collected a Munster medal following a 1-14 to 1-11 defeat of Borris-Ileigh in the provincial decider.

Two-in-a-row proved beyond Midleton, while the club also lost the decider to Blackrock in 1985. The following year Midleton were back in the decider, however, Fenton was relegated to the substitutes' bench as the club secured a 1-18 to 1-10 defeat of Blackrock.

In 1987 Fenton was back on the starting fifteen as Midleton faced Na Piarsaigh in the championship decider. An exciting 2-12 to 0-15 victory gave Fenton a second championship medal on the field of play. He later won a second Munster medal as Cappawhite were accounted for by 1-12 to 1-11 in the provincial decider. On 17 March 1988 Midleton faced Athenry in the All-Ireland decider and a close game developed. Two early goals by Kevin Hennessy and a kicked goal by Colm O'Neill gave Midleton a 3–8 to 0–9 victory and gave Fenton an All-Ireland Senior Club Hurling Championship medal.

Fenton was in the twilight of his career in 1991 when Midleton reached the championship decider once again. A 1-17 to 1-8 defeat of Glen Rovers gave Fenton his third championship medal on the field of play and his fourth overall.

=== Minor and under-21 ===
Fenton first played for Cork as a member of the minor hurling team on 1 July 1973. He scored a point from midfield on his debut in a 1-11 to 1-8 Munster semi-final defeat by Tipperary.

Two years later in 1975 Fenton was included on the Cork under-21 team. He won his first Munster medal that year following a 3–12 to 2–6 win over Limerick. On 11 October 1975 Cork faced Kilkenny in the All-Ireland decider in what was one of the games of the year. Fenton top scored for Cork with nine points from midfield. In a game of fluctuating fortunes Cork looked likely to succeed but were deprived of victory when Kilkenny 'keeper Kevin Fennelly made two great saves from Con Brassil and Finbarr Delaney in the closing stages. A 5-13 to 2-19 defeat was the result for Cork.

Cork continued their provincial dominance in 1976, with Fenton collecting a second Munster medal following a 2–11 to 3–6 win over Clare. The subsequent All-Ireland decider on was a replay of the previous year, with Cork facing Kilkenny as underdogs. The Rebels powered to a 2–17 to 1–8 victory, giving Fenton an All-Ireland Under-21 Hurling Championship medal.

=== Senior ===
==== Beginnings ====
Fenton made his senior championship debut as a substitute on 27 July 1975 in a 3-14 to 0-12 provincial final defeat of Limerick. It was his first Munster medal.

Cork enjoyed a hugely successful era, winning three successive All-Ireland championships, however, Fenton found it difficult to break onto the team. He was an unused substitute in 1978 as Cork defeated Kilkenny by 1-15 to 2-8 in the All-Ireland decider. It was O'Leary's third successive All-Ireland medal.

==== Difficult few years ====
Fenton was back on the starting fifteen in 1979 as Cork had the opportunity of capturing a record-equalling fourth successive All-Ireland. All went to plan as the Rebels secured a fifth consecutive provincial title following a 2–14 to 0–9 defeat of Limerick. It was Fenton's second Munster medal. Age and the exertions of the three previous campaigns finally caught up with Cork in the All-Ireland semi-final and a 2–14 to 1–13 defeat by Galway brought the four-in-a-row dream to an end.

Fenton added a National Hurling League medal to his collection in 1980, as Limerick were defeated after a thrilling draw and a replay. A record-breaking sixth successive provincial championship eluded Cork that year, however, Fenton won a second successive league medal in 1981 as Offaly were defeated by 3–11 to 2–8.

In 1982 Fenton endured a tough championship campaign as he was dropped from the starting fifteen for some key games. He won a third Munster medal that year when he came on as a substitute in Cork's 5-31 to 3-6 trouncing of Waterford. Fenton was dropped from the match day panel for Cork's subsequent All-Ireland defeat by Kilkenny.

Fenton's time as a substitute came to an end in 1983 as he secured a fourth Munster medal following a 3–22 to 0–12 rout of Waterford. The All-Ireland final on 4 September 1983 was a repeat of the previous year with Kilkenny providing the opposition once again. The Cats built up a healthy interval advantage of six points. Shortly after the restart the Noresiders advantage was nine points, however, they failed to score for the last seventeen minutes of the game. Cork rallied with goals from Tomás Mulcahy and Seánie O'Leary but were ultimately defeated by 2–14 to 2–12. In spite of this defeat Fenton was later presented with his first All-Star.

==== All-Ireland success ====
Midleton's club success in 1983 paved the way for Fenton to be appointed captain of the Cork team for 1984, the centenary year of the Gaelic Athletic Association. The year began well with Fenton guiding his team to victory in the special Centenary Cup competition. Cork were the dominant force in Munster once again in 1984, with Fenton winning a fifth Munster medal following a memorable 4–15 to 3–14 defeat of Tipperary in the provincial showpiece. The subsequent All-Ireland final on 2 September 1984, played at Semple Stadium in Thurles, saw Cork take on Offaly for the first time ever in championship history. The centenary-year final failed to live up to expectations and Cork recorded a relatively easy 3–16 to 1–12 victory. It was Fenton's first All-Ireland medal on the field of play while he also had the honour of lifting the Liam MacCarthy Cup. He was later honoured with a second successive All-Star as well as a Texaco Hurler of the Year award.

In 1985 Fenton added a sixth Munster medal to his collection as Cork defeated Tipperary by 4–17 to 4–11 in the provincial decider once again. He later won a third All-Star.

Cork made it five-in-a-row in Munster in 1986 as they defeated Clare by 2–18 to 3–12 to take the provincial title. It was Fenton's sixth Munster medal. This victory paved the way for an All-Ireland final meeting with Galway on 7 September 1986. The men from the west were the red-hot favourites against a Cork team in decline, however, on the day a different story unfolded. Four Cork goals, one from Fenton, two from Tomás Mulcahy and one from Kevin Hennessy, stymied the Galway attack and helped the Rebels to a 4–13 to 2–15 victory. It was Fenton's second All-Ireland medal while a fourth successive All-Star quickly followed.

==== Decline ====
In 1987 Fenton lined out in his last championship campaign. In the Munster semi-final replay against Limerick he scored, what is often regarded as, one of the greatest hurling goals of all-time. Playing in his usual midfield position he struck the sliotar on the ground and scored a goal from forty-five yards out. Cork's championship campaign eventually ended at the hands of Tipperary in the provincial decider, however, Fenton ended the year with a fifth successive All-Star award.

=== Inter-provincial ===
Fenton was chosen for duty with the Munster inter-provincial team for the first time in 1981. That year Munster faced arch rivals Leinster in the championship decider. A 2-16 to 2-6 trouncing gave Fenton his first Railway Cup medal.

After failing to make the team over the next few years, Fenton was back on the starting fifteen as captain in 1984. Leinster were the opponents once again, however, a 1-18 to 2-9 victory gave Munster the title and gave Fenton a second winners' medal as well as the honour of lifting the Railway Cup as captain.

Fenton added a third Railway Cup medal to his collection in 1985 as a Galway team representing Connacht were narrowly defeated by 3-6 to 1-11.

Fenton was included on the Munster team once again in 1986 and 1987, however, Connacht and Leinster ended their championship hopes on those occasions.

== Career statistics ==
| Team | Year | National League | | | Munster | | All-Ireland | | Total | |
| Team | Year | Division | Apps | Score | Apps | Score | Apps | Score | Apps | Score |
|---|---|---|---|---|---|---|---|---|---|---|
| Cork | 1974-75 | Division 1A | x | 0-00 | 1 | 0-00 | 0 | 0-00 | x | 0-00 |
| Cork | 1975-76 | Division 1A | x | 1-15 | 1 | 1-02 | 0 | 0-00 | x | 2-17 |
| Cork | 1976-77 | Division 1A | x | 0-02 | 0 | 0-00 | 0 | 0-00 | x | 0-02 |
| Cork | 1977-78 | Division 1A | x | 0-05 | 0 | 0-00 | 0 | 0-00 | x | 0-05 |
| Cork | 1978-79 | Division 1B | x | 2-05 | 2 | 0-06 | 1 | 0-01 | x | 2-12 |
| Cork | 1979-80 | Division 1A | x | 1-08 | 2 | 0-13 | — | | x | 1-21 |
| Cork | 1980-81 | Division 1A | x | 1-15 | 1 | 0-02 | — | | x | 1-17 |
| Cork | 1981-82 | Division 1A | x | 0-14 | 3 | 0-04 | 0 | 0-00 | x | 0-18 |
| Cork | 1982-83 | Division 1 | x | 0-00 | 3 | 0-01 | 2 | 0-01 | x | 0-02 |
| Cork | 1983-84 | Division 1 | x | 1-09 | 2 | 1-14 | 2 | 0-19 | x | 2-42 |
| Cork | 1984-85 | Division 1 | x | 0-10 | 2 | 2-11 | 1 | 2-02 | x | 4-23 |
| Cork | 1985-86 | Division 1 | 7 | 3-09 | 2 | 0-11 | 2 | 1-04 | 11 | 4-24 |
| Cork | 1986-87 | Division 1 | 3 | 1-09 | 4 | 1-38 | — | | 7 | 2-47 |
| Total | | | x | 10-101 | 23 | 5-102 | 8 | 3-27 | x | 28-330 |

== Honours ==
=== Team ===
Midleton

- All-Ireland Senior Club Hurling Championship (1): 1988
- Munster Senior Club Hurling Championship (2): 1983, 1987
- Cork Senior Hurling Championship (4): 1983, 1986 (sub), 1987, 1991
- Cork Intermediate Hurling Championship (1): 1978

Cork

- All-Ireland Senior Hurling Championship (3): 1978 (sub), 1984 (c), 1986
- Munster Senior Hurling Championship (8): 1975, 1978 (sub), 1979, 1982, 1983, 1984 (c), 1985, 1986
- National Hurling League (2): 1979–80, 1990–81
- All-Ireland Under-21 Hurling Championship (1): 1976
- Munster Under-21 Hurling Championship (2): 1975, 1976

Munster

- Railway Cup (3): 1981, 1984 (c), 1985

Sporting positions
| Preceded by Jimmy Barry-Murphy | Cork Senior Hurling Captain; 1984 | Succeeded by Ger Cunningham |
Achievements
| Preceded by Sylvie Linnane (Connacht) | Railway Cup Hurling Final winning captain 1984 | Succeeded by Ger Cunningham (Munster) |
| Preceded by Liam Fennelly (Kilkenny) | All-Ireland Senior Hurling Final winning captain 1984 | Succeeded by Pat Fleury (Offaly) |
Awards
| Preceded by Frank Cummins (Kilkenny) | Texaco Hurler of the Year; 1984 | Succeeded by Eugene Coughlan (Offaly) |
