= Midleton GAA =

Gaelic sports club in County Cork, Ireland

Midleton
- Mainistir na Corann
- Founded: 1885
- County: Cork
- Nickname: The Magpies
- Colours
- Grounds: Clonmult Memorial Park
- Coordinates: 51°55′13″N 8°10′33″W

Playing kits
Standard colours

Senior Club Championships
	All Ireland	Munster champions	Cork champions
Football:	1	1	2
Hurling:	1	2	8

Midleton Hurling and Football Club is a Gaelic Athletic Association club in Midleton, County Cork, Ireland. The club is affiliated to the East Cork Board and is primarily concerned with the game of hurling, but also fields teams in Gaelic football.

== History ==
Located in the town of Midleton, about 16km from Cork, Midleton Football Club was formally affiliated to the newly established Gaelic Athletic Association on 17 January 1885. The club had some early successes in winning consecutive Cork SFC titles in 1889 and 1890. The latter title was subsequently converted into a Munster SFC title, before Midleton beat the Wexford representatives in the 1890 All-Ireland final.

The club supplemented these Gaelic football titles by claiming Cork SHC titles in 1914 and 1916. The club continued to win divisional titles, as well as county junior and intermediate titles at various times over the following decades.

After winning the Cork IHC title in 1978, Midleton returned to the top flight and began a new era of success. The club won four Cork SHC titles between 1983 and 1991. The club also won two Munster Club SHC titles during that period, as well as beating Athenry in the 1988 All-Ireland club final. Midleton's successes continued into the 21st century with further Cork SHC titles in 2013 and 2021.

== Grounds ==
Midleton's home ground is Clonmult Memorial Park. It is named in honour of the Clonmult ambush, which took place in a nearby townland during the War of Independence. The official opening took place on 8 April 1962 and featured a challenge match between Cork and Limerick.

== Honours ==
- All-Ireland Senior Football Championship (1): 1890
- All-Ireland Senior Club Hurling Championship (1): 1988
- Munster Senior Football Championship (1): 1890
- Munster Senior Club Hurling Championship (2): 1983, 1987
- Cork Senior Football Championship (2): 1889, 1890
- Cork Senior Hurling Championship (8): 1914, 1916, 1983, 1986, 1987, 1991, 2013, 2021
- Cork Intermediate Hurling Championship (3): 1948, 1962, 1978
- Cork Intermediate Football Championship (1): 1984
- Cork Junior A Football Championship (3): 1896, 1917, 1939
- Cork Junior A Hurling Championship (4): 1917, 1945, 1984, 1990
- Cork Under-21 Hurling Championship (7) :1979, 1983, 1988, 1989, 2011, 2013, 2024
- Cork Minor Hurling Championships (9) : 1928, 1984, 1987, 1988, 1989, 2010, 2018, 2019, 2026
- Cork Junior B Inter-Divisional Hurling Championship (1) 2020
- East Cork Junior A Hurling Championships (10): 1925, 1929, 1934, 1936, 1943, 1945, 1982, 1984, 1989, 1990
- East Cork Junior A Football Championships (12): 1928, 1935, 1938, 1939, 1949, 1962, 1967, 1969, 1974, 1992, 2018, 2020

== Notable players ==
- John Fenton: All-Ireland SHC-winner (1978, 1984, 1986)
- Ger FitzGerald: All-Ireland SHC-winner (1986, 1990)
- Paddy FitzGerald: All-Ireland SHC-winner (1966)
- Pat Hartnett: All-Ireland SHC-winner (1984, 1986)
- Conor Lehane: National Hurling League-winner (2025)
- Denis Mulcahy: All-Ireland SHC-winner (1984, 1986)
- Mickey O'Connell: All-Ireland SHC-winner (1999)
- Tommy O'Connell
- Luke O'Farrell
- Colm O'Neill: All-Ireland SFC-winner (1989, 1990)
- Jim Power: All-Ireland SFC-winner (1890)
