= 1983 Cork Senior Hurling Championship =

Annual hurling competition season

- Dates: 13 May – 9 October 1983
- Teams: 18
- Champions: Midleton (3rd title); John Fenton (captain); Denis Kelleher (manager)
- Runners-up: St. Finbarr's; John Blake (captain); Con Roche (manager)

Tournament statistics
- Matches played: 17
- Goals scored: 48 (2.82 per match)
- Points scored: 361 (21.24 per match)
- Top scorer(s): Tony Coyne (2-27)

The 1983 Cork Senior Hurling Championship was the 95th staging of the Cork Senior Hurling Championship since its establishment by the Cork County Board in 1887. The championship began on 13 May 1983 and ended on 9 October 1983.

St. Finbarr's entered the championship as the defending champions in search of a fourth successive title.

The final was played on 9 October 1983 at Páirc Uí Chaoimh in Cork, between Midleton and St. Finbarr's, in what was their first ever meeting in the final. Midleton won the match by 1–18 to 2–09 to claim their third championship title overall and a first title in 67 years.

Youghal's Tony Coyne was the championship's top scorer with 2-27.

== Team changes ==
=== To Championship ===
Promoted from the Cork Intermediate Hurling Championship

- Milford

=== From Championship ===
Regraded to the Cork Intermediate Hurling Championship

- Éire Óg

Declined to field a team

- University College Cork

== Results ==
=== First round ===
13 May 1983 First round	St. Finbarr's	4-15 - 0-07	Nemo Rangers	Páirc Uí Chaoimh
	J Barry-Murphy 2-3, T Maher 1-2, V Twomey 1-1, J Hannon 0-4, T Finn 0-2, J Meyler 0-2, J Allen 0-1.		T Nation 0-4, D Allen 0-1, S Hayes 0-1, S Coughlan 0-1.	Referee: M O'Flaherty

15 May 1983 First round	Blackrock	0-09 - 3-12	Youghal	Clonmult Memorial Park
	P Moylan 0-3, M Kilcoyne 0-2, D Buckley 0-2, F Cummins 0-1, J Murphy 0-1.		T Coyne 1-10, S O'Leary 2-2.	Referee: W Horgan (Brian Dillons)

=== Second round ===
8 May 1983 Second round	Midleton	1-15 - 0-15	Duhallow	Castletownroche
	J Fenton 0-9, K Hennessy 1-1, S O'Brien 0-1, D Boylan 0-1, C O'Neill 0-1, J Hartnett 0-1, J Boylan 0-1.		N Brosnan 0-8, J Noonan 0-2, D Fitzpatrick 0-1, O Kearney 0-1, D Sheehan 0-1, PJ Stokes 0-1, D Sullivan 0-1.	Referee: M Lyons (Araglen)

14 May 1983 Second round	Avondhu	0-05 - 0-08	Muskerry	Páirc Uí Chaoimh
	J Kenny 0-2, Dave Relihan 0-1, E Cleary 0-1, C Hannon 0-1.		M Malone 0-2, J Lucey 0-2, P O'Connell 0-2, C Kelly 0-1, D Desmond 0-1.	Referee: P Cronin

15 May 1983 Second round	Ballyhea	2-09 - 2-05	Carrigdhoun	Páirc Mac Gearailt
	W Shanahan 0-7, D Ryan 1-1, D O'Flynn 1-0, N Ronan 0-1.		B Scanlon 2-0, J Drinan 0-3, B Coleman 0-1, D Drinan 0-1.	Referee: R Murphy (Lyre)

15 May 1983 Second round	Glen Rovers	0-17 - 0-04	Seandún	Páirc Uí Chaoimh
	M McGrath 0-9, T Mulcahy 0-2, A Browne 0-2, T O'Neill 0-1, J Buckley 0-1, P Horgan 0-1, K O'Keeffe 0-1.		G Hanley 0-2, P O'Sullivan 0-1, J Corcoran 0-1.	Referee: B Cody

29 May 1983 Second round	Sarsfields	2-07 - 3-14	St. Finbarr's	Caherlahg Sportsfield
	T Murphy 2-0, B Óg Murphy 0-4, G McEvoy 0-1, D Prendergast 0-1, R Fitzgerald 0-1.		J Cremin 0-8, F Ramsey 1-2, C Ryan 1-1, V Twoemy 1-1, J Barry-Murphy 0-1, J Meyler 0-1.	Referee: W Horgan (Brian Dillons)

29 May 1983 Second round	Milford	1-08 - 0-08	Na Piarsaigh	Millstreet
	B Sheehan 1-4, P O'Connor 0-1, J O'Gorman 0-1, C Collins 0-1, P Buckley 0-1.		L O'Callaghan 0-3, P O'Connor 0-3, F Buckley 0-1, W O'Connell 0-1.	Referee: R Murphy (Lyre)

29 May 1983 Second round	Newtownshandrum	0-06 - 0-17	Carbery	Millstreet
	J Coughlan 0-3, PJ Greensmith 0-2, D Coughlan 0-1.		P Crowley 0-7, T Crowley 0-6, G Long 0-2, F O'Regan 0-1, B Lordan 0-1.	Referee: M Keane (Cloughduv)

29 May 1983 Second round	Imokilly	2-07 - 2-08	Youghal	Castlemartyr
	M Bowen 1-1, P Ronan 1-0, G Bowen 0-2, T O'Connor 0-1, M Mellerick 0-1, D Walsh 0-1, R O'Connor 0-1.		M Butler 1-1, S O'Leary 1-0, T Coyne 0-3, M Coyne 0-2, S Ring 0-1, R Swayne 0-1.	Referee: D O'Connor

=== Quarter-finals ===
16 July 1983 Quarter-final	Midleton	5-13 - 2-06	Muskerry	Church Road
	J Fenton 1-7, D Boylan 2-1, J Hartnett 1-3, G Fitzgerald 1-1, K Hennessy 0-1.		D Desmond 0-5, S Noonan 1-0, C Kelly 1-0, P O'Connell 0-1.	Referee: W Horgan (Brian Dillons)

16 July 1983 Quarter-final	Youghal	2-10 - 2-08	Milford	Moore Park
	T Coyne 1-7, M Butler 1-0, S O'Leary 0-2, R Swaine 0-1.		V Sheehan 2-4, D Roche 0-1, M Fitzgibbons 0-1, N Fitzgibbons 0-1, J O'Gorman 0-1.	Referee: M O'Flaherty (Blackrock)

23 July 1983 Quarter-final	Glen Rovers	4-11 - 1-16	Carbery	Jack Barrett Park
	T Collins 2-0, A Browne 1-2, T Mulcahy 1-2, P Horgan 0-3, M McGrath 0-2, J Buckley 0-1, L Mulcahy 0-1.		P Crowley 0-7, D Healy 1-0, T Crowley 0-4, K Kehilly 0-1, F O'Regan 0-1, B Lordan 0-1, J Long 0-1, P O'Donovan 0-1.	Referee: D Collins (Kinsale)

23 July 1983 Quarter-final	St. Finbarr's	3-10 - 0-13	Ballyhea	Dr. Mannix Park
	V Twomey 2-0, T Finn 1-1, J Cremin 0-4, J Barry-Murphy 0-2, J Allen 0-2, J Meyler 0-1.		W Shanahan 0-3, J O'Callaghan 0-3, D Ryan 0-3, D O'Flynn 0-2, A Morrissey 0-1, N Ronayne 0-1.	Referee: J Motherway (Aghada)

=== Semi-finals ===
11 September 1983 Semi-final	Midleton	3-12 - 2-10	Youghal	Páirc Uí Chaoimh
	K Hennessy 2-2, G Fitzgerald 0-4, J Boylan 1-0, J Hartnett 0-2, J Fenton 0-2, S O'Brien 0-1, T McCarthy 0-1.		T Coyne 0-7, A O'Regan 1-0, M Butler 1-0, P Grace 0-2, R Swaine 0-1.	Referee: F Murphy (Blackrock)

25 September 1983 Semi-final	St. Finbarr's	1-20 - 2-09	Glen Rovers	Páirc Uí Chaoimh
	J Cremin 0-7, V Twomey 1-1, C Ryan 0-3, J Barry-Murphy 0-3, T Finn 0-3, J Meyler 0-1, T Maher 0-1, W Cashman 0-1.		A Browne 1-1, M McGrath 0-4, T O'Neill 1-0, P Horgan 0-2, J Buckley 0-2.

=== Final ===
9 October 1983 Final	Midleton	1-18 - 2-09	St. Finbarr's	Páirc Uí Chaoimh
	J Fenton 0-10, G Fitzgerald 1-2, C O'Neill 0-3, D Boylan 0-1, T McCarthy 0-1, S O'Brien 0-1.		D Walsh 0-4, J Barry-Murphy 1-0, C Ryan 1-0, J Cremin 0-3, T Maher 0-1, W Cashman 0-1.	Referee: F Murphy (Blackrock)

== Championship statistics ==
=== Top scorers ===
Top scorers overall

Rank	Player	Club	Tally	Total	Matches	Average
1	Tony Coyne	Youghal	2-27	33	4	8.25
2	John Fenton	Midleton	1-28	31	4	7.75
3	John Cremin	St. Finbarr's	0-22	22	5	4.40
4	Jimmy Barry-Murphy	St. Finbarr's	3-09	18	5	3.60
5	Vincent Sheehan	Milford	3-08	17	2	8.50
6	Martin McGrath	Glen Rovers	0-15	15	3	5.00
7	Vincent Towmey	St. Finbarr's	4-02	14	5	2.80
7	Pádraig Crowley	Carbery	0-14	14	2	7.00
9	Kevin Hennessy	Midleton	3-04	13	4	3.25
9	Seánie O'Leary	Youghal	3-04	13	4	3.25
9	Ger FitzGerald	Midleton	2-07	13	4	3.25

Top scorers in a single game

Rank	Player	Club	Tally	Total	Opposition
1	Tony Coyne	Youghal	1-10	13	Blackrock
2	Vincent Sheehan	Milford	2-04	10	Youghal
2	John Fenton	Midleton	1-07	10	Muskerry
2	Tony Coyne	Youghal	1-07	10	Milford
2	John Fenton	Midleton	0-10	10	St. Finbarr's
6	Jimmy Barry-Murphy	St. Finbarr's	2-03	9	Nemo Rangers
6	Martin McGrath	Glen Rovers	0-09	9	Seandún
6	John Fenton	Midleton	0-09	9	Duhallow
9	Seánie O'Leary	Youghal	2-02	8	Blackrock
9	Kevin Hennessy	Midleton	2-02	8	Youghal
9	Ned Brosnan	Duhallow	0-08	8	Midleton
9	John Cremin	St. Finbarr's	0-08	8	Sarsfields

=== Miscellaneous ===
- Milford make their first appearance at senior level.
- Midleton qualified for the final for the first time since 1938.
- Midleton won the title for the first time since 1916 after a 67-year gap.
- The title goes to a non city club for the first time since 1970.
