= 1987–88 All-Ireland Senior Club Hurling Championship =

All-Ireland Senior Club Hurling Championship 1987–88
Championship Details
- Dates: 23 August 1987 – 17 March 1988
- Teams: 33

All Ireland Champions
- Winners: Midleton (1st win)
- Captain: Ger Power

All Ireland Runners-up
- Runners-up: Athenry
- Captain: Mattie Gannon

Provincial Champions
- Munster: Midleton
- Leinster: Rathnure
- Ulster: Ruairí Óg
- Connacht: Athenry

Championship Statistics
- Matches Played: 33
- Top Scorer: P. J. Molloy (0–31)

The 1987–88 All-Ireland Senior Club Hurling Championship was the 18th staging of the All-Ireland Senior Club Hurling Championship, the Gaelic Athletic Association's premier inter-county club hurling tournament. The championship ran from 23 August 1987 to 17 March 1988.

Borris-Ileigh of Tipperary were the defending champions, however, they failed to qualify after being defeated by Lorrha in the North Tipperary SHC. Cappawhite of Tipperary made their championship debut.

The All-Ireland final was played at Croke Park in Dublin on 17 March 1988, between Midleton of Cork and Athenry of Galway, in what was a first championship meeting between the teams. Midleton won the match by 3–08 to 0–09 to claim a first title.

Athenry's P. J. Molloy was the championship's top scorer with 0–31.

== Connacht Senior Club Hurling Championship ==
=== Connacht first round ===
11 October 1987 First round	Ballinamore	3–13 – 0–01	Craobh Rua	Markievicz Park
	J Casey 2–0, K Mahon 1–1, H Murphy 0–4, S Burke 0–2, D O'Brien 0–2, R Logan 0–2, C Harte 0–1, E McGowan 0–1.		R Water 0–1.

=== Connacht second round ===
26 October 1987 Second round	Ballinamore	0–02 – 10–10	Pádraig Pearse's	Seán O'Heslin Memorial Park
	G Logan 0–1, K Mahon 0–1.		M Scott 3–1, T Flynn 3–0, A Dooley 1–4, K Dooley 1–1, T Frehill 1–1, J Flynn 1–1, G Burke 0–1, T Carey 0–1.

=== Connacht semi-final ===
22 November 1987 Semi-final	Pádraig Pearse's	3–09 – 3–03	Tooreen	Pádraig Pearse's GAA Grounds
	A Dooley 0–6, M Scott 1–0, G Maguire 1–0, T Frehill 1–0, A Barrett 0–2, R Dooley 0–1.		D Greally 1–1, T Henry 1–1, J Cunnane 1–1.

=== Connacht final ===
13 December 1987 Final	Pádraig Pearse's	0–07 – 4–19	Athenry	Pádraig Pearse's GAA Grounds
	T Frehill 0–3, A Barrett 0–2, A Dooley 0–2.		PJ Molloy 0–8, S Kearns 1–2, P Higgins 1–2, P Healy 0–5, M Donoghue 1–0, S Keane 1–0, J Rabbitte 0–1, G Dempsey 0–1.

== Leinster Senior Club Hurling Championship ==
=== Leinster preliminary round ===
11 October 1987 Preliminary round	Slasher Gaels	4–05 – 3–05	Naomh Moninne	Pearse Park
	F Kelly 2–2, J Finucane 1–0, M Jennings 1–0, N Daly 0–2, K Byrne 0–1.		C O'Gorman 2–0, B Brady 1–3, J Murphy 0–1, P Brady 0–1.

=== Leinster first round ===
18 October 1987 First round	Trim	4–16 – 1–02	Slasher Gaels	St Loman's Park
	D Murray 2–5, K Murray 0–6, I McCaffrey 1–0, K Toole 1–0, L Dempsey 0–2, T Daniels 0–1, F Hatton 0–1, D O'Keeffe 0–1.		M Finnegan 1–0, S Stakelum 0–1, N Daly 0–1.

18 October 1987 First round	Naomh Eoin	1–15 – 0–05	Coill Dubh	Dr Cullen Park
	E Quirke 1–2, M Slye 0–5, P Quirke 0–2, J O'Hara 0–1, N Smithers 0–1, C Kenny 0–1, S Murphy 0–1, J Nolan 0–1, P Foley 0–1.		J Byrne 0–3, R Byrne 0–2.

18 October 1987 First round	Portlaoise	2–21 – 0–07	Kiltegan	O'Moore Park
	B Bohane 0–5, L Beggin 0–5, T Walton 1–1, P Bergin 0–4, M Keegan 1–0, S Plunkett 0–3, P Cleary 0–2, N Rigney 0–1.		T Kelly 0–5, P Byrne 0–2.

=== Leinster quarter-finals ===
31 October 1987 Quarter-final	Trim	1–06 – 7–12	St. Rynagh's	St Loman's Park
	E McCaffrey 1–1, D Murray 0–2, M Dempsey 0–1, M O'Connor 0–1, K Murray 0–1.		K Flannery 2–2, MF Dolan 2–2, M Duignan 1–2, R Mannion 1–2, D Fogarty 1–1, M Conneely 0–1, A Horan 0–1, D Devey 0–1.

31 October 1987 Quarter-final	Naomh Eoin	1–12 – 1–13	Rathnure	Dr Cullen Park
	M Slye 0–5, M Minchin 1–1, S Murphy 0–3, P Quirke 0–1, C Kenny 0–1, E Quirke 0–1.		J Murphy 1–4, J Houlihan 0–3, N Herne 0–2, J Codd 0–2, P Codd 0–1, J Redmond 0–1.	Referee: P Delaney (Laois)

31 October 1987 Quarter-final	Faughs	2–16 – 1–08	Ringtown	O'Toole Park
	MJ Ryan 0–8, T McGrath 1–2, P Burke 1–0, T Spellman 0–3, M Keogh 0–2, I Lyng 0–1.		D Kilcoyne 0–7, MJ Corrigan 1–1.

7 November 1987 Quarter-final	Portlaoise	0–14 – 1–08	Glenmore	O'Moore Park
	B Bohane 0–10, P Cleary 0–2, M Cashin 0–1, L Bergin 0–1.		M Phelan 1–1, R Heffernan 0–4, C Heffernan 0–1, P Barron 0–1, M O'Connor 0–1.

=== Leinster semi-finals ===
22 November 1987 Semi-final	Rathnure	1–14 – 1–04	Faughs	Dr Cullen Park
	J Murphy 1–1, J Houlihan 0–4, V Reddy 0–2, J Codd 0–2, N Herne 0–2, M Morrissey 0–2, P Codd 0–1.		T McGrath 1–1, MJ Ryan 0–2, W Hughes 0–1.

22 November 1987 Semi-final	Portlaoise	1–12 – 0–07	St. Rynagh's	O'Moore Park
	B Bohane 0–6, M Keegan 1–1, L Bergin 0–2, P Bergin 0–1, T Walton 0–1, D Rigney 0–1.		K Flannery 0–3, M Kenneally 0–3, D Fogarty 0–1.	Referee: JF Bailey (Dublin)

=== Leinster final ===
6 December 1987 Final	Rathnure	3–08 – 1–13	Portlaoise	Nowlan Park
	J Houlihan 0–5, J Murphy 1–1, N Hearne 1–0, P Codd 1–0, J Conran 0–1, P Dunphy 0–1.		B Bohane 1–1, P Bergin 0–4, P Critchley 0–2, M Keegan 0–2, J Taylor 0–1, P Cleary 0–1, L Bergin 0–1, M Cashin 0–1.

== Munster Senior Club Hurling Championship ==
=== Munster first round ===
18 October 1987 First round	Patrickswell	1–16 – 1–10	Causeway	Bruff Sportsfield
	F Nolan 0–4, L Considine 1–0, P Foley 0–3, G Kirby 0–3, A Carmody 0–2, G Hayes 0–2, S Carey 0–1, S Kirby 0–1.		J Regan 1–5, S Sheehan 0–2, T Burke 0–1, T O'Connor 0–1, M Leahy 0–1.	Referee: W Horgan (Cork)

1 November 1987 First round	Clarecastle	2–11 – 3–12	Midleton	Cusack Park
	P Russell 0–5, C Martin 1–1, K Power 1–0, V O'Loughlin 0–2, A Neville 0–1, T Howard 0–1, E Doyle 0–1.		G Fitzgerald 2–0, J Fenton 0–6, V O'Neill 1–0, J Hartnett 0–3, S O'Brien 0–2, J Boylan 0–1.	Referee: J Moore (Waterford)

=== Munster semi-finals ===
14 November 1987 Semi-final	Midleton	2–13 – 2–05	Ballyduff Upper	Clonmult Memorial Park
	C O'Neill 1–3, J Fenton 0–5, G Fitzgerald 1–0, K Hennessy 0–3, V O'Neill 0–1, J Boylan 0–1.		M Walsh 0–4, J Quirke 1–0, L Power 1–0, P Prendergast 0–1.	Referee: T Murray (Limerick)

22 November 1987 Semi-final	Cappawhite	2–08 – 0–09	Patrickwell	Cappawhite Sportsfield
	P O'Neill 1–2, M McDermott 1–1, C Ryan 0–2, G O'Neill 0–2, J O'Neill 0–1.		G Kirby 0–5, D Punch 0–1, S Kirby 0–1, A Carmody 0–1, G Hayes 0–1.	Referee: J Moore (Waterford)

=== Munster final ===
5 December 1987 Final	Midleton	1–12 – 1–11	Cappawhite	FitzGerald Park
	J Fenton 0–6, J Hartnett 0–5, K Hennessy 1–0, C O'Neill 0–1.		P O'Neill 0–6, G O'Neill 1–1, M McDermott 0–2, J O'Neill 0–1, A Buckley 0–1.	Referee: J Moore (Waterford)

== Ulster Senior Club Hurling Championship ==
=== Ulster first round ===
23 August 1987 First round	Woodford Gaels	3–14 – 3–06	Lisbellaw St Patrick's	Páirc na gCéad Ultach
	B McHugh 1–2, L McCabe 1–2, J Kelly 0–4, T Downes 1–0, C Maguire 0–3, D Maguire 0–2, T Doonan 0–1.		M McElroy 2–0, K Corrigan 1–1, D McShea 0–2, O McDonnell 0–2, T Prunty 0–1.

23 August 1987 First round	Eire Óg Carrickmore	4–06 – 4–06	Clontibret	Éire Óg GAA Grounds
	D Brogan 1–5, M Kelly 2–0, D Donaghy 1–0, P Sweeney 1–0 (og), B Quinn 0–1.		K Lavelle 3–0, M O'Dowd 0–3, P Curran 0–2, K Brennan 0–1.

30 August 1987 First round	Setanta	2–04 – 3–11	Keady Lámh Dhearg	Setanta Park

6 September 1987 First round replay	Clontibret	4–03 – 2–04	Eire Óg Carrickmore	O'Neill Park

=== Ulster second round ===
13 September 1987 Second round	Kevin Lynch's Dungiven	1–07 – 1–01	Woodford Gaels	Páirc Uí Cháithaín
	JA Mullen 1–2, B McGilligan 0–1, C O'Donnell 0–1, J Donaghy 0–1, M McCracken 0–1, D Kealey 0–1.		J Kelly 1–0, K Barry-Murphy 0–1.

13 September 1987 Second round	Keady Lámh Dhearg	4–07 – 2–08	Clontibret	Keady Grounds

=== Ulster semi-finals ===
27 September 1987 Semi-final	Keady Lámh Dhearg	0–06 – 1–09	Ballycran	Keady Grounds
	F Fullerton 0–2, J McCormick 0–1, J McGuinness 0–1, E McKee 0–1, P Donnelly 0–1.		M O'Flynn 1–4, H Gilmore 0–2, P Dorrian 0–1, D Hughes 0–1, B Hughes 0–1.

18 October 1987 Semi-final	Kevin Lynch's Dungiven	0–03 – 3–10	Ruairí Óg	Páirc Uí Cháithaín
	JA Mullins 0–2, M McCracken 0–1.		D McNaughten 1–5, A McNaughten 1–0, A McGuille 1–0, J Carson 0–2, F McAllister 0–1, L McKeegan 0–1, M McNaughten 0–1.

=== Ulster final ===
8 November 1987 Final	Ballycran	1–06 – 3–10	Ruairí Óg	McKenna Park

== All-Ireland Senior Club Hurling Championship ==
=== All-Ireland quarter-final ===
31 January 1988 Quarter-final	Athenry	2–14 – 0–05	Glen Rovers	Dunlo GAA Grounds
	PJ Molloy 0–11, G Dempsey 1–1, P Higgins 1–0, S Keane 0–1, P Healy 0–1.		R Durack 0–4, P Dwyer 0–1.

=== All-Ireland semi-finals ===
14 February 1988 Semi-final	Athenry	3–12 – 1–04	Rathnure	Dunlo GAA Grounds
	PJ Molloy 0–6, D Higgins 1–2, P Healy 1–1, P Higgins 1–0, S Kearns 0–2, M Donoghue 0–1.		J Codd 1–0, J Houlihan 0–2, V Reddy 0–1, J O'Connell 0–1.

14 February 1988 Semi-final	Ruairí Óg	2–05 – 3–11	Midleton	Páirc Mhuire
	L McAllister 1–0, A McNaughten 1–0, D McNaughten 0–2, J McNaughten 0–2, L McKeegan 0–1.		K Hennessy 1–2, J Fenton 0–5, G Fitzgerald 1–1, V O'Neill 1–0, C O'Neill 0–1, J Hartnett 0–1, S O'Brien 0–1.

=== All-Ireland final ===
17 March 1988 Final	Midleton	3–08 – 0–09	Athenry	Croke Park
	K Hennessy 2–3, C O'Neill 1–1, J Fenton 0–2, T McCarthy 0–1, G Fitzgerald 0–1.		PJ Molloy 0–6, P Healy 0–1, J Hardiman 0–1, S Keane 0–1.	Referee: G Kirwan (Offaly)

== Championship statistics ==
=== Top scorers ===
Rank	Player	Club	Tally	Total	Matches	Average
1	P. J. Molloy	Athenry	0–31	31	4	7.75
2	Billy Bohane	Portlaoise	1–22	25	4	6.25
3	John Fenton	Midleton	0–24	24	5	4.80
