= 1983–84 All-Ireland Senior Club Hurling Championship =

All-Ireland Senior Club Hurling Championship 1983–84
Championship Details
- Dates: 1983 – 3 June 1984

All Ireland Champions
- Winners: Ballyhale Shamrocks (2nd win)
- Captain: Kevin Fennelly

All Ireland Runners-up
- Runners-up: Gort

Provincial Champions
- Munster: Midleton
- Leinster: Ballyhale Shamrocks
- Ulster: Ballycastle McQuillans
- Connacht: Gort

The 1983–84 All-Ireland Senior Club Hurling Championship was the 14th staging of the All-Ireland Senior Club Hurling Championship, the Gaelic Athletic Association's premier inter-county club hurling tournament.

Loughgiel Shamrocks of Antrim were the defending champions; however, they failed to qualify after being beaten by Ballycastle McQuillans in the 1983 Antrim SHC final. Lixnaw of Kerry and Midleton of Cork made their championship debuts.

The All-Ireland final, a replay, was played at Semple Stadium in Thurles on 3 June 1984, between Ballyhale Shamrocks of Kilkenny and Gort of Galway, in what was a first championship meeting between the teams. Ballyhale Shamrocks won the match by 1–10 to 0–07 to claim their second title overall and a first in three years.

== Results ==
=== Connacht Senior Club Hurling Championship ===
Second round

8 October 1982 Second round	Tooreen	3–07 – 1–04	Gortletteragh	Knock Road, Ballyhaunis
	E Burke 2–0, V Henry 1–2, J Cunnane 0–3, J Henry 0–3.

Semi-final

Semi-final	v

Final

6 November 1983 Final	Tooreen	1–05 – 3–13	Gort	Knock Road, Ballyhaunis
	J Henry 1–4, J Cunnane 0–1.		G Lally 1–3, G Linnane 0–5, J Grehan 1–0, B Brennan 1–0, M Brennan 0–1, M Linnane 0–1, M Murphy 0–1, N Cahill 0–1, P Hehir 0–1.

=== Leinster Senior Club Hurling Championship ===
First round

23 October 1983 First round	Ardclough	1–10 – 1–05	St. Mullin's	Sallins Road, Naas
	J Walsh 0–7, M Behan 1–1, M Savage 0–1, T Johnson 0–1.		P MUrphy 1–1, J McDonald 0–4.	Referee: P Delaney (Laois)

29 October 1983 First round	Naomh Moninne	4–03 – 2–13	Kilatale	Páirc an Chuinnigh, Knockbridge
	O Reilly 1–1, D McCarthy 0–1, H Smith 0–1.		R Melia 1–3, M Regan 1–2, J Gilsenan 0–3, A Critchley 0–2, J Kane 0–1, G Regan 0–1, P Gilsenan 0–1.

29 October 1983 First round	Avondale	1–08 – 8–08	Portlaoise	Rathdrum
	P Jordan 1–5, P Sheehan 0–1, S O'Brien 0–1.		M Bohane 3–1, B Bohane 2–4, L Bergin 1–1, S Plunkett 1–0, N Rigney 1–0, M Keegan 0–1, P Critchley 0–1.	Referee: D Roche (Wexford)

Quarter-finals

22 October 1983 Quarter-final	Erins Isle	3–08 – 1–08	Brownstown	Croke Park, Dublin
	D Hurley 0–6, E Butler 1–0, M Hurley 1–0, M Keaney 1–0, PJ Buckley 0–1, P Reaney 0–1.		J Davis 1–0, J Leonard 0–3, J Fitzsimons 0–2, M Daly 0–1, T Carr 0–1, C Shaw 0–1.

6 November 1983 Quarter-final	Kiltale	1–10 – 6–10	Ballyhale Shamrocks	St. Loman's Park, Trim
	M Regan 1–2, A Crickley 0–2, P Curley 0–2, G Rogan 0–1, H Donovan 0–1, P Farrell 0–1, R Melia 0–1.		S Grace 3–2, D Fennelly 2–2, J Dollard 1–1, S Fennelly 0–2, D Donnelly 0–1, T Phelan 0–1, M Fennelly 0–1.

6 November 1983 Quarter-final	Ardclough	1–12 – 1–18	Kinnitty	Sallins Road, Naas
	J Walshe 0–6, B Burke 0–4, N Walsh 1–0, E King 0–2.		P Corrigan 1–6, P Delaney 0–3, B Kennedy 0–3, M Corrigan 0–2, C Spain 0–2, J Flaherty 0–1, N Kennedy 0–1.

6 November 1983 Quarter-final	Portlaoise	2–13 – 4–07	Buffers Alley	O'Keeffe Park, Borris-in-Ossory
	B Bohane 0–7, L Bergin 1–3, M Keegan 1–0, P Critchley 0–3.		T Doran 2–0, T Dempsey 1–3, S Whelan 1–1, T O'Dwyer 0–2, M Butler 0–1.	Referee: M Kelleher (Kildare)

12 November 1983 Quarter-final replay	Buffers Alley	0–14 – 2–09	Portlaoise	Wexford Park, Wexford
	M Butler 0–9, T Dempsey 0–1, T Dwyer 0–1, T Doran 0–1, S Whelan 0–1, G Sweeney 0–1.		B Bohane 0–9, M Bohane 1–1, P Critchley 1–0.	Referee: M Kelleher (Kildare)

Semi-finals

19 November 1983 Semi-final	Ballyhale Shamrocks	4–11 – 0–09	Erins Isle	Dr. Cullen Park, Carlow
	D Fennelly 2–1, K Fennelly 1–4, M Kelly 1–1, S Grace 0–3, T Phelan 0–1, M Fennelly 0–1.		F White 0–2, P Reaney 0–2, M Hurley 0–2, D Hurley 0–2, J Twomey 0–1.	Referee: J Rankins (Laois)

20 November 1983 Semi-final	Kinnitty	1–13 – 2–09	Portlaoise	Nowlan Park, Kilkenny
	P Corrigan 0–9, M Corrigan 1–2, M Cleere 0–2.		J Bohane 1–2, L Bergin 1–1, J Keenan 0–3, B Bohane 0–2, J Keenan 0–1.

Final

4 December 1983 Final	Ballyhale Shamrocks	3–06 – 0–09	Kinnitty	Geraldine Park, Athy
	L Fennelly 2–1, K Fennelly 1–3, S Fennelly 0–2.		P Corrigan 0–4, M Cleere 0–3, M Corrigan 0–1, B Kennedy 0–1.	Referee: N O'Donoghue (Dublin)

=== Munster Senior Club Hurling Championship ===
Quarter-finals

23 October 1983 Quarter-final	Lixnaw	0–07 – 3–17	Patrickswell	Lixnaw
	J O'Connell 0–3, P McMahon 0–2, S Flaherty 0–1, P O'Sullivan 0–1.		R Bennis 1–3, T O'Brien 1–3, F Nolan 1–2, L Foley 0–4, J Fenton 0–3, D Punch 0–2.

23 October 1983 Quarter-final	Mount Sion	1–07 – 2–15	Midleton	Walsh Park, Waterford
	P McGrath 1–1, P Ryan 0–2, J Greene 0–2, K Ryan 0–2.		G Fitzgerald 2–1, J Fenton 0–6, C O'Neill 0–5, T McCarthy 0–1, P Hartnett 0–1, D Boylan 0–1.	Referee: G Ryan (Tipperary)

Semi-finals

5 November 1983 Semi-final	Midleton	2–14 – 0–15	Sixmilebridge	Clonmult Memorial Park, Midleton
	K Hennessy 1–2, C O'Neill 1–2, D Boylan 0–4, J Fenton 0–3, J Hartnett 0–2, T McCarthy 0–1.		G McInerney 0–7, M Corry 0–3, D Chaplin 0–1, J Lynch 0–1, T Morey 0–1, F Quilligan 0–1, PJ Fitzgerald 0–1.	Referee: G Ryan (Tipperary)

6 November 1983 Quarter-final	Patrickswell	0–11 – 2–06	Borris-Ileigh	FitzGerald Park, Kilmallock
	R Bennis 0–3, J Fenton 0–2, F Nolan 0–2, G Hayes 0–2, S Kirby 0–1, S Foley 0–1.		T Stapleton 2–0, M Coen 0–2, P Kenny 0–2, T Ryan 0–1, N O'Dwyer 0–1.	Referee: M O'Flaherty (Cork)

Finals

20 November 1983 Final	Midleton	3–06 – 1–12	Borris-Ileigh	FitzGerald Park, Kilmallock
	K Hennessy 3–1, J Fenton 0–2, T McCarthy 0–2, J Hartnett 0–1.		N O'Dywer 0–6, T Stapleton 1–0, P Kenny 0–3, M Coen 0–1, B Ryan 0–1, G Stapleton 0–1.	Referee: K Walsh (Limerick)

4 December 1983 Final replay	Midleton	1–14 – 1–11	Borris-Ileigh	FitzGerald Park, Kilmallock
	J Fenton 1–10, G Fitzgerald 0–2, K Hennessy 0–1, J Boylan 0–1.		N O'Dwyer 1–6, P Kenny 0–3, A Ryan 0–1, B Ryan 0–1.

=== Ulster Senior Club Hurling Championship ===
Final

23 October 1983 Final	Ballycastle McQuillans	4–12 – 2–03	Ballygalget	Páirc Mac Uílín, Ballycastle

=== All-Ireland Senior Club Hurling Championship ===
Quarter-final

5 February 1984 Quarter-final	Ballycastle McQuillans	3–07 – 0–08	Desmonds	St. Patrick's Park, Ballyvoy
	D Donnelly 1–4, E Donnelly 1–0, P Watson 1–0, O Laverty 0–1, D Mooney 0–1, P McKillen 0–1.		M Burke 0–4, P Quinlan 0–2, G O'Connor 0–1, T Bradley 0–1.

Semi-finals

14 April 1984 Semi-final	Gort	1–11 – 2–04	Midleton	Gaelic Grounds, Limerick
	G Linnane 1–2, G Lally 0–4, P Hehir 0–4, S Linnane 0–1.		J Hartnett 1–1, C O'Neill 1–0, J Fenton 0–2, G Fitzgerald 0–1.	Referee: N Duggan (Limerick)

14 April 1984 Semi-final	Ballyhale Shamrocks	3–14 – 2–10	Ballycastle McQuillans	Páirc Tailteann, Navan
	K Fennelly 1–7, D Fennelly 1–3, M Kelly 1–0, G Fennelly 0–2, S Fennelly 0–1, M Fennelly 0–1.		E Donnelly 2–1, D Donnelly 0–4, B Donnelly 0–4, P Boyle 0–1.	Referee: M McCormack (Meath)

Final

15 April 1984 Final	Ballyhale Shamrocks	1–10 – 1–10	Gort	St. Brendan's Park, Birr
	K Fennelly 1–5, D Fennelly 0–2, L Long 0–1, M Fennelly 0–1, G Fennelly 0–1.		G Lally 0–5, M Murphy 1–0, K Fahy 0–2, M Cahill 0–1, S Linnane 0–1, P Hehir 0–1.	Referee: P Delaney (Laois)

3 June 1984 Final replay	Ballyhale Shamrocks	1–10 – 0–07	Gort	Semple Stadium, Thurles
	D Fennelly 0–5, K Fennelly 0–4, G Fennelly 1–0, B Fennelly 0–1.		G Lally 0–3, P Piggott 0–3, G Linnane 0–1.	Referee: G Ryan (Tipperary)

== Championship statistics ==
=== Top scorers ===
Rank	Player	Club	Tally	Total	Matches	Average
1	Kevin Fennelly	Ballyhale Shamrocks	4–23	35	6	5.83
2	Dermot Fennelly	Ballyhale Shamrocks	5–13	28	6	4.66
2	Billy Bohane	Portlaoise	2–22	28	4	7.00
4	John Fenton	Midleton	1–23	26	5	5.20
5	Paddy Corrigan	Kinnitty	1–19	22	3	7.33
6	Greg Lally	Gort	1–15	18	4	4.50
7	Kevin Hennessy	Midleton	4-04	16	4	4.00

=== Miscellaneous ===
- At the end of the drawn All-Ireland final, both sets of players from Ballyhale Shamrocks and Gort refused to play extra-time and insisted on a replay.
