= Miah Norberg =

Irish hurler

Personal information
- Native name: Diarmuid Norberg (Irish)
- Nickname: Miah
- Born: 20 September 1870 Ballintemple, Cork, Ireland
- Died: 28 March 1935 (aged 64) Ballinlough, Cork, Ireland
- Occupation: Market gardener

Sport
- Sport: Hurling
- Position: Quarter-back
Club
- Years: Club
- Blackrock
Club titles
- Cork titles: 6
Inter-county
| Years | County | Apps (scores) |
| 1892–1897 | Cork | 11 |
Inter-county titles
- Munster titles: 2
- All-Irelands: 3

James Jeremiah "Miah" Norberg (20 September 1870 – 28 March 1935) was an Irish hurler. His career included back-to-back All-Ireland Senior Hurling Championship (SHC) victories with the Cork senior hurling team.

== Playing career ==
=== Blackrock ===
Norberg joined the Blackrock senior team at a time when the club dominated hurling in Cork. He claimed his first silverware in 1891 when the club defeated inniscarra by 4–4 to no score to win the Cork County Championship. After the defeat to Redmonds in the 1892 final, Norberg won a second county title in 1893 when Blackrock avenged the previous year's defeat with a 2–5 to 1–1 victory over Redmonds. It was the first of three successive championship titles, with defeats of Blarney in 1894 and Ballyhea in 1895 bringing his championship medal tally to four from five successive final appearances. After a one-year absence, Blackrock were back in the 1897 final, with Norberg winning a fifth championship medal after a 5–8 to no score defeat of Aghada. He ended his career by collecting a sixth championship winners' medal after Blackrock's 2–9 to 0–20 win over Carrigtwohill in the 1898 final.

=== Cork ===
Having played no part in the 1892 Munster SHC, Norberg earned inclusion on the Cork senior hurling team in advance of the delayed 1892 All-Ireland SHC final against Dublin. He ended the game with his first winners' medal after the 2–3 to 1–5 victory. Norberg added a Munster SHC medal to his collection after Cork's 5–3 to no score win over Limerick in the 1893 Munster SHC final. He was again included on the team for the 1893 All-Ireland SHC final, ending the game with a second successive winners' medal after the 6–8 to 0–2 victory over Kilkenny. Norberg won a second Munster SHC title in 1894, after Cork secured a third successive championship following a 3–4 to 1–2 win over Tipperary. He was selected as a quarter-back partner to Willie John O'Connell for the 1894 All-Ireland SHC final against Dublin, ending the game by becoming one of the first players to win three successive All-Ireland medals after the 5–20 to 2–0 victory. Four-in-a-row eluded Norberg after Cork withdrew in protest from the 1895 All-Ireland SHC; however, he was included on the Cork team that lost back-to-back Munster finals to Tipperary in 1896 and Limerick in 1897.

== Personal life and death ==
Norberg was born in Ballintemple, Cork, the eldest of three children of James and Mary (née Cleary). His father, a native of Sweden, was a master mariner who had settled in Cork. After a brief education, Norberg spent his entire working life as a market gardener. He married Margaret Kearney (1886-1964) in Innishannon in November 1908. They lived in a house in Ballinlough, Cork, and had four children. Norberg's grandson, Frank, captained Cork during the 1972 All-Ireland SHC.

On 28 March 1935, Norberg died aged 64 at the County Home in Cork after suffering heart and kidney failure the previous day.

== Honours ==
Blackrock

- Cork Senior Hurling Championship (6): 1891, 1893, 1894, 1895, 1897, 1898

Cork

- All-Ireland Senior Hurling Championship (3): 1892, 1893, 1894
- Munster Senior Hurling Championship (2): 1893, 1894

== Sources ==
- Corry, Eoghan, The GAA Book of Lists (Hodder Headline Ireland, 2005).
- Cronin, Jim, A Rebel Hundred: Cork's 100 All-Ireland Titles.
- Donegan, Des, The Complete Handbook of Gaelic Games (DBA Publications Limited, 2005).
