= Mick Murphy (Cork hurler) =

Irish sportsman and revolutionary figure

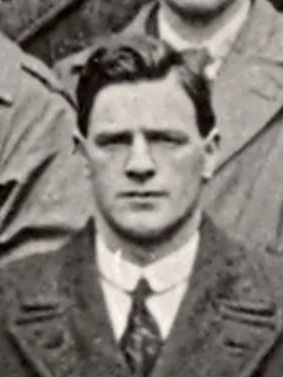
- Murphy in 1922

Personal information
- Native name: Míchéal Ó Murchú (Irish)
- Born: 30 March 1894 Ballintemple, Cork, Ireland
- Died: 20 September 1968 (aged 74) South Infirmary, Cork, Ireland
- Occupation: Foreman carpenter

Sport
- Sport: Hurling
- Position: Left corner-back
Clubs
- Years: Club
- Nemo Rangers; Blackrock; Faughs
Club titles
- Cork titles: 4
Inter-county
- Years: County
- 1919-1927 1928: Cork; Dublin
Inter-county titles
- Munster titles: 4
- Leinster titles: 1
- All-Irelands: 2
- NHL: 1

Michael Murphy (30 March 1894 – 20 September 1968) was an Irish sportsman and revolutionary figure. He is best known as a hurler who played in a variety of positions for the Cork and Dublin senior teams.

== Biography ==
Born in Ballintemple, Cork, Murphy was politically motivated from an early age. He was a supporter of the All-for-Ireland League which was led by William O'Brien before joining the Irish Volunteers in 1913. Murphy was also one of a number of men who marched to Macroom on Easter Sunday 1916 in anticipation of a country-wide uprising. He later became one of the leading figures in the War of Independence and served as Commandant and O/C of the Cork No. 1 Brigade of the Irish Republican Army. Murphy was an opponent of the Anglo-Irish Treaty.

Apart from his Volunteer activities, Murphy was well-known as a hurler. He began his club career with Nemo Rangers before later transferring to Blackrock, with whom he won four Cork Senior Championship medals. Murphy's prowess at club level saw him join the Cork senior team. He won his first All-Ireland Championship medal in 1919 before completing a league-championship double in 1926. He also won four Munster Championship medals during that time. Murphy also had the distinction of playing against Cork in the All-Ireland Championship. This occurred in 1928 after he transferred to Dublin, where he played at club level with Faughs and was selected for the Dublin senior team that won the Leinster Championship but was later beaten by Cork in the All-Ireland semi-final.

On 20 September 1968, Murphy died from colon cancer aged 74.

== Honours ==
Blackrock

- Cork Senior Hurling Championship (4): 1920, 1924, 1925, 1927

Cork

- All-Ireland Senior Hurling Championship (2): 1919, 1926
- Munster Senior Hurling Championship (4): 1919, 1920, 1926, 1927
- National Hurling League (1): 1925-26

Dublin

- Leinster Senior Hurling Championship (1): 1928
