= Steva Riordan =

Irish hurler

Personal information
- Native name: Stiofán Ó Riordáin (Irish)
- Nickname: Steva
- Born: Stephen John Riordan; 24 December 1876 Ballintemple, Cork, Ireland
- Died: 23 August 1942 (aged 65) Capwell Road, Cork, Ireland
- Occupation: Rate collector

Sport
- Sport: Hurling
- Position: Half-forward
Club
- Years: Club
- 1898-1913: Blackrock
Club titles
- Cork titles: 7
Inter-county
Years	County	Apps (scores)
1902-1908	Cork	21
Inter-county titles
- Munster titles: 4
- All-Irelands: 2

Stephen John Riordan (24 December 1876 – 23 August 1942) was an Irish hurler who played for Cork Championship club Blackrock. He played for the Cork senior hurling team for six years, during which time he usually lined out as a half-forward.

Riordan began his hurling career at club level with Blackrock. He broke onto the club's top adult team in 1898, a year in which he won his first Cork Championship title. Riordan won a further six championship titles with Blackrock.

At inter-county level, Riordan joined the Cork senior team in 1902. From his debut, he was ever-present as a half-forward and made 21 Championship appearances in a career that ended with his last game in 1908. During that time he was part of two All-Ireland Championship-winning teams – in 1902 and 1903 as captain. Riordan was also involved in four of Cork's Munster Championship-winning teams.

== Honours ==
Blackrock

- Cork Senior Hurling Championship (7): 1898, 1903, 1908, 1910, 1911, 1912, 1913

Cork

- All-Ireland Senior Hurling Championship (2): 1902, 1903 (c)
- Munster Senior Hurling Championship (4): 1903, 1904, 1905, 1907

Sporting positions
Preceded by Jamesy Kelleher	Cork Senior Hurling Captain; 1903	Succeeded by Dan Harrington
Achievements
Preceded by Jamesy Kelleher	All-Ireland Senior Hurling Final winning captain 1903	Succeeded by Jer Doheny
