= 1899 Cork Senior Hurling Championship =

Annual hurling competition season

- Champions: St. Finbarr’s (1st title); Jim Young (captain)
- Runners-up: Redmonds; Tom Irwin (captain)

The 1899 Cork Senior Hurling Championship was the 13th staging of the Cork Senior Hurling Championship since its establishment by the Cork County Board in 1887.

Blackrock were the defending champions, however, they were defeated by Ballyhea.

On 6 August 1899, St Finbarr's won the championship following an 0–8 to 0–7 defeat of Redmonds in the final. This was their first championship title.

== Results ==
Final

6 August 1899 Final	St. Finbarr’s	0-08 – 0-07	Redmonds	Cork Park

=== Miscellaneous ===
- St. Finbarr's win their first title.
