= 1990 Cork Senior Hurling Championship =

Annual hurling competition season

- Dates: 29 April – 21 October 1990
- Teams: 18
- Champions: Na Piarsaigh (1st title); Christy Coughlan (captain); Éamonn Ryan (manager)
- Runners-up: St. Finbarr's; Frank Ramsey (captain); Con Roche (manager)

Tournament statistics
- Matches played: 19
- Goals scored: 65 (3.42 per match)
- Points scored: 408 (21.47 per match)
- Top scorer(s): Brian Cunningham (2-28)

The 1990 Cork Senior Hurling Championship was the 102nd staging of the Cork Senior Hurling Championship since its establishment by the Cork County Board in 1887. The draw for the opening fixtures took place on 17 December 1989. The championship began on 29 April 1990 and ended on 21 October 1990.

Glen Rovers entered the championship as the defending champions, however, they were beaten by Carbery in the quarter-finals.

The final replay was played on 21 October 1990 at Páirc Uí Chaoimh in Cork between Na Piarsaigh and St. Finbarr's, in what was their first ever meeting in a final. Na Piarsaigh won the match by 2–07 to 1–08 to claim their first ever championship title.

Brian Cunningham was the championship's top scorer with 2-28.

== Results ==
=== First round ===
13 May 1990 First round	Muskerry	2-11 - 1-14	Duhallow	Mourne Abbey Sporstfield, M'abbey
	M O'Donoghue 2-2, G Manley 0-3, M Sheehan 0-2, T Ó Murchú 0-2, D Lucey 0-1, G Nagle 0-1.		T Burke 1-8, F Keane 0-3, J O'Mahony 0-1, J O'Connor 0-1, J Sheehan 0-1.	Referee: P O'Brien (Mallow)

13 May 1990 First round	Carbery	2-08 - 1-09	Milford	Ovens
	B Harte 1-1, M Foley 0-4, D O'Neill 1-0, G O'Connell 0-2, D O'Connell 0-1.		M Fitzgibbon 1-4, M O'Connell 0-2, V Sheehan 0-1, S Stritch 0-1, S O'Gorman 0-1.	Referee: L O'Flynn (Éire Óg)

1 June 1990 First round replay	Muskerry	4-11 - 3-09	Duhallow	Mourne Abbey Sporstfield, M'abbey
	P Flynn 2-2, M O'Donoghue 1-2, P O'Reilly 1-0 (og), G Manley 0-4, K Murray 0-2, T Barry-Murphy 0-1.		J O'Callaghan 3-0, J O'Connor 0-3, F Keane 0-2, T Burke 0-2, D Keane 0-1, C Buckley 0-1.	Referee: D Murphy (Clyda Rovers)

=== Second round ===
29 April 1990 Second round	Imokilly	1-12 - 0-08	Avondhu	Rathcormac
	C Counihan 1-2, G Lewis 0-4, J O'Connor 0-3, D Walsh 0-1, P O'Shea 0-1, T Fitzgibbon 0-1.		J Keane 0-3, D Coughlan 0-1, J Lenihan 0-1, J O'Sullivan 0-1, J Hayes 0-1, R Sheehan 0-1.	Referee: W Horgan (Brian Dillons)

4 May 1990 Second round	Glen Rovers	2-12 - 2-09	University College Cork	Páirc Uí Chaoimh, Cork
	J Fitzgibbon 2-2, K McGuckin 0-5, J Buckley 0-3, C Ring 0-2.		D Murphy 1-1, A Kelly 1-0, P Heffernan 0-3, A O'Sullivan 0-2, J Ryan 0-2, C Casey 0-1.

12 May 1990 Second round	Seandún	2-12 - 0-10	Blackrock	Páirc Uí Chaoimh, Cork
	M Dineen 2-0, F Delaney 0-5, F Collins 0-3, P Deasy 0-2, P Moylan 0-1, M Kilcoyne 0-1.		L Tuohy 0-5, C Coffey 0-3, D Murphy 0-1, G Healy 0-1.	Referee: J O'Leary (Na Piarsaigh)

13 May 1990 Second round	Carrigdhoun	0-10 - 1-09	Erin's Own	Páirc Uí Chaoimh, Cork
	K Kingston 0-6, K McCarthy 0-1, G Cooney 0-1, J O'Mahony 0-1, S McCarthy 0-1.		G Bowen 1-0, J Corcoran 0-3, PJ Murphy 0-2, F Horgan 0-2, J Dillon 0-1, C Dillon 0-1.	Referee: W Horgan (Brian Dillons)

13 May 1990 Second round	Na Piarsaigh	2-18 - 2-10	Ballyhea	Moore Park, Kilworth
	T O'Sullivan 0-7, D Kidney 1-2, R McDonnell 1-0, M Mullins 0-3, C Donovan 0-2, J O'Sullivan 0-2, P O'Connor 0-1, J Twomey 0-1.		A Morrissey 1-6, M O'Callaghan 1-2, J O'Callaghan 0-1, G O'Connor 0-1.	Referee: P Spillane (Carrigtwohill)

13 May 1990 Second round	St. Finbarr's	2-17 - 1-09	Valley Rovers	Páirc Uí Chaoimh, Cork
	B Cunningham 0-9, M Barry 1-1, C Ryan 1-1, N Leonard 0-2, K Murphy 0-2, F Lehane 0-1, T Doolin 0-1.		D Kiely 1-2, C O'Donovan 0-3, J Shiels 0-3, E Burke 0-1.	Referee: J Motherway (Aghada)

9 June 1990 Second round	Midleton	2-11 - 0-14	Sarsfields	Páirc Uí Chaoimh, Cork
	J Fenton 1-6, G Fitzgerald 1-1, J Hartnett 0-1, K Hennessy 0-1, J Boylan 0-1, P O'Brien 0-1.		T Murphy 0-7, M Flynn 0-3, T McAuliffe 0-2, D Kenneaaly 0-1, N Ahern 0-1.	Referee: W Horgan (Brian Dillons)

17 June 1990 Second round	Carbery	2-11 - 2-08	Muskerry	Innishannon Sportsfield, Innishannon
	B Harte 2-2, M Foley 0-4, J O'Connell 0-1, P Crowley 0-1, D O'Neill 0-1, P Cahalane 0-1, D O'Connell 0-1.		T Ó Murchú 2-0, T Barry-Murphy 0-2, K Murray 0-2, P Flynn 0-1, G Manley 0-1, M Sheehan 0-1, M O'Donoghue 0-1.	Referee: D Collins (Kinsale)

=== Quarter-finals ===
27 July 1990 Quarter-final	Blackrock	2-12 - 2-11	Erin's Own	Riverstown Sportsfield, Glanmire
	P Deasy 2-1, F Collins 0-5, J Cashman 0-2, F Delaney 0-2, J Evans 0-1, E Kavanagh 0-1.		B O'Shea 1-0, G Bowen 1-0, F Horgan 0-3, T Kelleher 0-2, PJ Murphy 0-2, T O'Keeffe 0-1, P Geasley 0-1, J Corcoran 0-1, R O'Connor 0-1.	Referee: J O'Leary (Na Piarsaigh)

27 July 1990 Quarter-final	St. Finbarr's	4-09 - 2-06	Imokilly	Riverstown Sportsfield, Glanmire
	C Ryan 2-2, N Leonard 1-1, B Cunningham 0-4, F Lehane 1-0, C O'Mahony 0-1, J Cremin 0-1.		G Scully 1-0, T Hurley 1-0, P O'Shea 0-2, T Fitzgibbon 0-1, G Lewis 0-1, C Clancy 0-1, D Irwin 0-1.	Referee: W Horgan (Brian Dillons)

28 July 1990 Quarter-final	Carbery	2-11 - 1-08	Glen Rovers	Jack Barrett Park, Kinsale
	D O'Connell 1-1, P Crowley 0-4, M Foley 1-0, C Murphy 0-2, D O'Neill 0-2, B Harte 0-1, P Cahalane 0-1.		K McGuckin 0-4, T Mulcahy 1-0, C Ring 0-3, J O'Brien 0-1.	Referee: G Harrington (Carrigaline)

29 July 1990 Quarter-final	Na Piarsaigh	2-12 - 0-13	Midleton	Carrigtwohill Sportsfield, Carrigtwohill
	J O'Connor 1-2, T O'Sullivan 0-4, C Coughlan 1-0, M Dineen 0-3, Mick Mullins 0-2, Mark Mullins 0-1.		J Fenton 0-6, K Hennessy 0-2, C O'Neill 0-2, V O'Neill 0-1, G Fitzgerald 0-1.	Referee: F Murphy (Blackrock)

=== Semi-finals ===
9 September 1990 Semi-final	St. Finbarr's	4-18 - 2-12	Carbery	Coachford Sportsfield, Coachford
	B Cunningham 1-6, T Finn 1-3, M Barry 1-2, J Griffin 1-1, C Ryan 0-4, N Leonard 0-1, J Cremin 0-1.		D O'Connell 1-3, P Crowley 1-0, T Brennan 0-3, M Foley 0-3, B Harte 0-1, E Kenneally 0-1, P Cahalane 0-1.	Referee: W Horgan (Brian Dillons)

23 September 1990 Semi-final	Na Piarsaigh	2-17 - 1-04	Blackrock	Páirc Uí Chaoimh, Cork
	Mark Mullins 1-12, Mick Mullins 1-2, T O'Sullivan 0-1, R McDonnell 0-1, D Kidney 0-1.		F Delaney 1-2, T Cashman 0-1, M Harrington 0-1.	Referee: J Motherway (Aghada)

=== Finals ===
14 October 1990 Final	Na Piarsaigh	1-12 - 3-06	St. Finbarr's	Páirc Uí Chaoimh, Cork
	J O'Sullivan 1-1, Mark Mullins 0-5, Mick Mullins 0-3, M Dinneen 0-1, L O'Callaghan 0-1, J O'Connor 0-1.		B Cunningham 1-4, B Barry 2-0, C O'Mahony 0-1, F Ramsey 0-1.	Attendance: 15,000; Referee: F Murphy (Blackrock)

21 October 1990 Final replay	Na Piarsaigh	2-07 - 1-08	St. Finbarr's	Páirc Uí Chaoimh, Cork
	J O'Connor 2-0, Mark Mullins 0-4, R McDonnell 0-1, T O'Sullivan 0-1, J O'Sullivan 0-1.		B Cunningham 0-5, M Barry 1-0, C Ryan 0-1, T Leahy 0-1.

== Championship statistics ==
=== Top scorers ===
Overall

Rank	Player	Club	Tally	Total	Matches	Average
1	Brian Cunningham	St. Finbarr's	2-28	34	5	6.80
2	Mark Mullins	Na Piarsaigh	1-22	25	4	6.25
3	Michael Barry	St. Finbarr's	5-03	18	5	3.60
4	Christy Ryan	St. Finbarr's	3-08	17	5	3.40
5	John Fenton	Midleton	1-12	15	2	7.50
6	Maurice O'Donoghue	Muskerry	3-05	14	3	4.66
6	Paddy Harte	Carbery	3-05	14	4	3.50
6	Mark Foley	Carbery	1-11	14	4	3.50
9	Tim Burke	Duhallow	1-10	13	2	6.50
9	Tony O'Sullivan	Na Piarsaigh	0-13	13	5	2.60

In a single game

Rank	Player	Club	Tally	Total	Opposition
1	Mark Mullins	Na Piarsaigh	1-12	15	Blackrock
2	Tim Burke	Duhallow	1-08	11	Muskerry
3	Jessie O'Callaghan	Duhallow	3-00	9	Muskerry
3	Brian Cunningham	St. Finbarr's	1-06	9	Carbery
3	John Fenton	Midleton	1-06	9	Sarsfields
3	Alex Morrissey	Ballyhea	1-06	9	Na Piarsaigh
3	Brian Cunningham	St. Finbarr's	0-09	9	Valley Rovers
8	Christy Ryan	St. Finbarr's	2-02	8	Imokilly
8	Maurice O'Donoghue	Muskerry	2-02	8	Duhallow
8	Paddy Harte	Carbery	2-02	8	Muskerry
8	John Fitzgibbon	Glen Rovers	2-02	8	UCC
8	Pat Flynn	Muskerry	2-02	8	Duhallow

=== Miscellaneous ===
- Na Piarsaigh became the first city side other than "the big three" to win the title since Redmonds in 1917. It is also their first ever title.
