= 1928 Cork Senior Hurling Championship =

Annual hurling competition season

- Dates: 25 March 1928 – 21 October 1928
- Teams: 15
- Champions: Éire Óg (1st title); Dinny Barry-Murphy (captain)
- Runners-up: Mallow; Michael Driscoll (captain)

Tournament statistics
- Matches played: 14
- Goals scored: 96 (6.86 per match)
- Points scored: 66 (4.71 per match)

The 1928 Cork Senior Hurling Championship was the 40th staging of the Cork Senior Hurling Championship since its establishment by the Cork County Board in 1887. The draw for the opening round fixtures took place at the Cork Convention on 29 January 1928. The championship began on 25 March 1928 and ended on 21 October 1928.

Blackrock were the defending champions, however, they were defeated by Mallow in the second round.

On 21 October 1928, Éire Óg won the championship following a 5–02 to 3–02 defeat of Mallow in the final. It remains their only championship title.

== Team changes ==
=== To Championship ===
Promoted from the Cork Intermediate Hurling Championship

- Cobh

== Results ==
=== First round ===
| 25 March 1928 First round | Cobh | 5-01 - 5-00 | Kinsale | Carrigaline Sportsfield, Carrigaline |

| 25 March 1928 First round | Glen Rovers | 2-01 - 5-07 | Blackrock | Turners Cross, Cork |

| 8 April 1928 First round | Sarsfields | 2-02 - 4-01 | Mallow | Fermoy Sportsfield, Fermoy |

| 15 April 1928 First round | Éire Óg | 10-02 - 5-01 | Shamrocks | Turners Cross, Cork |

| 29 April 1928 First round | University College Cork | 5-03 - 2-02 | Redmonds | Cork Athletic Grounds, Cork |

| 17 June 1928 First round | Carrigtwohill | 7-01 - 1-00 | Midleton | Riverstown Sportsfield, Riverstown |

| 8 July 1928 First round | St. Finbarr's | 1-10 - 3-00 | Collins | Cork Athletic Grounds, Cork |

=== Second round ===
| 3 June 1928 Second round | Fr. Matthew Hall | 3-06 - 2-01 | Cobh | Riverstown Sportsfield, Riverstown |

| 1 July 1928 Second round | Mallow | 3-03 - 3-02 | Blackrock | Blarney Sportsfield, Blarney |

| 17 June 1928 Second round | Éire Óg | 5-02 - 2-01 | University College Cork | Callincollig Sportsfield, Ballincollig |

| 12 August 1928 Second round | St. Finbarr's | 3-03 - 3-01 | Carrigtwohill | Cork Athletic Grounds, Cork |

=== Semi-finals ===
| 23 September 1928 Semi-final | Éire Óg | 3-03 - 2-02 | St. Finbarr's | Coachford Sportsfield, Coachford |

| 30 September 1928 Semi-final | Mallow | 2-03 - 0-04 | Fr. Matthew Hall | The Mardyke, Cork |

=== Final ===
| 21 October 1928 Final | Éire Óg | 5-02 – 3-02 | Mallow | Cork Athletic Grounds, Cork |

== Championship statistics ==
=== Miscellaneous ===
- The 5–02 to 2-05 first round defeat of St. Finbarr's by Collins was declared null and void after an objection by St. Finbarr's was upheld.
- Mallow's defeat of Blackrock in the second round was regarded at the time as one of the biggest shocks in the history of the championship. It inspired the song When Mallow Beat Blackrock.
- It is the first final to not have a city club since 1918. It is also the first final to have no city club since 1909.
- Éire Óg win their first, and to date only, title.
- Éire Óg are the first non city club to win the title since 1918.
- Mallow qualify for their first county final.
