= 1919 Cork Senior Hurling Championship =

Annual hurling competition season

- Dates: 6 April 1919 – 14 September 1919
- Teams: 14
- Champions: St. Finbarr’s (5th title); T. Finn (captain)
- Runners-up: Blackrock; M. Murphy (captain)

Tournament statistics
- Matches played: 13
- Goals scored: 80 (6.15 per match)
- Points scored: 50 (3.85 per match)

The 1919 Cork Senior Hurling Championship was the 32nd staging of the Cork Senior Hurling Championship since its establishment by the Cork County Board in 1887. The draw for the opening round fixtures took place on 11 March 1919. The championship began on 6 April 1919 and ended on 14 September 1919.

Carrigtwohill were the defending champions, however, they were defeated by St. Finbarr's in the second round.

On 14 September 1919, St. Finbarr's won the championship following a 5–3 to 4–1 defeat of Blackrock in the final. This was their fifth championship title overall and their first title in 13 championship seasons.

== Team changes ==
=== To Championship ===
Promoted from the Cork Intermediate Hurling Championship

- Nemo

== Results ==
=== First round ===
6 April 1919 First round	Carrigtwohill	4-01 - 1-01	Passage	Cob Sportsfield, Cobh

6 April 1919 First round	St. Finbarr's	7-03 - 0-03	Kinsale	Ballinhassig Sportsfield, Ballinhassig

20 April 1919 First round	Redmonds	3-03 - 2-00	Nemo	Cork Athletic Grounds, Cork

27 April 1919 First round	Shamrocks	3-03 - 2-01	Midleton	Cork Athletic Grounds, Cork

27 April 1919 First round	Cloughduv	3-00 - 0-01	Collegians	Coachford Sportsfield, Coachford

11 May 1919 First round	Blackrock	3-02 - 2-01	St Mary's	Cork Athletic Grounds, Cork

6 July 1919 First round	Cobh	3-01 - 0-00	Ballyhea	Cork Athletic Grounds, Cork

=== Second round ===
1 June 1919 Second round	St. Finbarr's	4-05 - 3-01	Carrigtwohill	Riverstown Sportsfield, Sallybrook

15 June 1919 Second round	Blackrock	7-00 - 2-01	Redmonds	Cork Athletic Grounds, Cork

20 July 1919 Second round	Cobh	5-05 - 3-03	Shamrocks	Cork Athletic Grounds, Cork

- Cloughduv received a bye in this round.

=== Semi-finals ===
22 June 1919 Semi-final	St. Finbarr's	4-03 - 3-00	Cloughduv	Cork Athletic Grounds, Cork

10 August 1919 Semi-final	Blackrock	6-07 - 0-01	Cobh	Cork Athletic Grounds, Cork

=== Final ===
14 September 1919 Final	St. Finbarr’s	5-03 - 4-01	Blackrock	Cork Athletic Grounds, Cork

=== Miscellaneous ===
- St. Finbarr's win their first title since 1906.
