= 1906 Cork Senior Hurling Championship =

Annual hurling competition season

- Champions: St. Finbarr’s (4th title)
- Runners-up: Ballymartle

The 1906 Cork Senior Hurling Championship was the 19th staging of the Cork Senior Hurling Championship since its establishment by the Cork County Board in 1887.

St. Finbarr's were the defending champions from 1903 because the 1905 championship wasn't completed.

St. Finbarr's won the championship following a 2–9 to 0–6 defeat of Ballymartle in the final. As a result of this victory they were also awarded the 1905 championship title. Consequently, this was their fourth championship title overall and their third title in succession.

== Results ==
Final

3 February 1907 Final	St. Finbarr’s	2-09 – 0-06	Ballymartle	Ballinhassig Sportsfield, Ballinhassig

== Championship statistics ==
=== Miscellaneous ===
- St. Finbarr's become the second team after Blackrock in 1895 to win three successive championship titles.
- [[Ballymartle GAA|Ballymartle]] qualify for the final for the first time.
