= 1905 Cork Senior Hurling Championship =

Annual hurling competition season

- Champions: St. Finbarr’s (3rd title)

The 1905 Cork Senior Hurling Championship was supposed to be the 19th staging of the Cork Senior Hurling Championship, however, due to a delay in the completion of the 1904 championship it never took place.

St. Finbarr's were the defending champions.

St. Finbarr's were subsequently awarded the title after winning the 1906 championship.
