= 1896 Cork Senior Hurling Championship =

Annual hurling competition season

- Champions: Ballyhea (1st title); Jer Murphy (captain)
- Runners-up: Ballygarvan

The 1896 Cork Senior Hurling Championship was the 10th staging of the Cork Senior Hurling Championship since its establishment by the Cork County Board in 1887.

Blackrock were the defending champions, however, they were defeated by Redmonds in the first round of the championship.

On 6 December 1896, Ballyhea won the championship following a 6–10 to 1–2 defeat of Ballygarvan in the final. This remains their only championship title.

== Results ==
=== Semi-finals ===
15 November 1896 Semi-final	Ballyhea	3-04 - 0-06	Redmonds	Mallow Town Park, Mallow
				Referee: W Aherne (Cork Co. Board)

=== Final ===
6 December 1896 Final	Ballyhea	6-10 – 1-02	Ballygarvan	Mallow Town Park, Mallow

=== Miscellaneous ===
- Ballyhea win their first title and what remains their only championship title.
- Ballyhea become only the second non city club to win the title.
