= 1914 Cork Senior Hurling Championship =

Annual hurling competition season

- Champions: Midleton (1st title); Gerald O'Shea (captain)
- Runners-up: Blackrock

The 1914 Cork Senior Hurling Championship was the 27th staging of the Cork Senior Hurling Championship since its establishment by the Cork County Board in 1887.

Blackrock were the defending champions.

On 15 November 1914, Midleton won the championship following a walkover by Blackrock in the final. This was their first championship title.

== Results ==
=== Final ===
15 November 1914 Final	Midleton	w/o – scr.	Blackrock	Mallow Town Park, Mallow
				Referee: T Irwin

=== Miscellaneous ===
- Midleton are awarded their first title.
- Midleton add a hurling title to their two football titles.
