= 1918 Cork Senior Hurling Championship =

Annual hurling competition season

- Champions: Carrigtwohill (1st title); Billy Kennedy (captain)
- Runners-up: Blackrock; Andy Buckley (captain)

The 1918 Cork Senior Hurling Championship was the 31st staging of the Cork Senior Hurling Championship since its establishment by the Cork County Board in 1887.

Redmonds were the defending champions, however, the club refused to field a team in the championship after a dispute with the county board after the suspension of some players from their Gaelic football team.

On 28 September 1918, Carrigtwohill won the championship following a 4–1 to 1–7 defeat of Blackrock in the final. This was their first championship title ever.

== Results ==
=== Quarter-finals ===
| Quarter-final | Carrigtwohill | w/o - scr. | Redmonds |

=== Semi-finals ===
| 1 September 1918 Semi-final | Blackrock | 3-04 - 2-04 | Collegians | Cork Athletic Grounds |

| 8 September 1918 Semi-final | Carrigtwohill | 6-04 - 3-01 | St. Finbarr's | Cork Athletic Grounds |

=== Final ===
| 29 September 1918 Final | Carrigtwohill | 4-01 – 1-07 | Blackrock | Cork Athletic Grounds |

=== Miscellaneous ===
- Carrigtwohill win their first title.
- Blackrock suffer their first loss in a final on the field of play.
