= Connie Sheehan =

Irish hurler

Personal information
- Native name: Conchur Ó Síocháin (Irish)
- Nickname: Connie
- Born: 31 May 1889 High Street, Cork, Ireland
- Died: 21 February 1950 (aged 60) Barrack Street, Cork, Ireland
- Occupation: Motor driver

Sport
- Sport: Hurling
- Position: Centre-back
Club
- Years: Club
- Redmonds
Club titles
- Cork titles: 2
Inter-county
Years	County	Apps (scores)
1910-1921	Cork	27
Inter-county titles
- Munster titles: 4
- All-Irelands: 1

Cornelius Sheehan (31 May 1889 – 21 February 1950) was an Irish hurler who played as a centre-back with the Cork senior hurling team. He was an All-Ireland Championship winner in 1919.

== Career ==
Sheehan began his hurling career at club level with Redmonds. He enjoyed a lengthy career with the club, however, and won Cork Senior Championship titles as captain in 1915 and 1917.

At inter-county level, Sheehan first played for the Cork senior hurling team on 3 July 1910. He was a regular member of the team over much of the following decade and won four Munster Championship medals, including one as captain. The highlight of Sheehan's inter-county career was the winning of an All-Ireland Championship medal in 1919 after a defeat of Dublin in the final. He played his last game for Cork on 28 May 1922 in what was the opening round of the delayed 1921 championship.

On 21 February 1950, Sheehan died from bronchitis aged 60.

== Honours ==
Redmonds

- Cork Senior Hurling Championship (2): 1915 (c), 1917 (c)

Cork

- All-Ireland Senior Hurling Championship (1): 1919
- Munster Senior Hurling Championship (4): 1912, 1915 (c), 1919, 1920

Sporting positions
Preceded by Barry Murphy	Cork Senior Hurling Captain; 1915-1916	Succeeded by
