= 1915 Cork Senior Hurling Championship =

Annual hurling competition season

- Champions: Redmonds (4th title); Connie Sheehan (captain)
- Runners-up: Collegians; S. Reidy (captain)

The 1915 Cork Senior Hurling Championship was the 28th staging of the Cork Senior Hurling Championship since its establishment by the Cork County Board in 1887.

Midleton were the defending champions.

On 8 August 1915, Redmonds won the championship following a 4–01 to 0–01 defeat of Collegains in the final. This was their fourth championship title overall and their first title in 14 championship seasons.

== Results ==
=== Second round ===
23 May 1915 Second round replay	St. Mary's	3-03 – 2-03	St. Finbarr's	Cork Athletic Grounds

=== Quarter-finals ===
6 June 1915 Semi-final	Redmonds	4-01 – 1-01	St. Mary's	Cork Athletic Grounds

=== Semi-finals ===
4 July 1915 Semi-final	Redmonds	6-01 – 2-02	Midleton	Cork Athletic Grounds
				Referee: A Fitzgerald (Blackrock)

=== Final ===
8 August 1915 Final	Redmonds	4-01 – 0-01	Collegians	Cork Athletic Grounds

=== Miscellaneous ===
- Redmonds win their first title since 1901.
- Collegians became the first college side to qualify for the championship final.
