= 1925 Cork Senior Hurling Championship =

Annual hurling competition season

- Dates: 5 April 1925 – 23 August 1925
- Teams: 13
- Champions: Blackrock (17th title); Seán Óg Murphy (captain)
- Runners-up: St. Finbarr’s; Dannix Ring (captain)

Tournament statistics
- Matches played: 12
- Goals scored: 95 (7.92 per match)
- Points scored: 77 (6.42 per match)

The 1925 Cork Senior Hurling Championship was the 37th staging of the Cork Senior Hurling Championship since its establishment by the Cork County Board in 1887. The draw for the opening round fixtures took place on 11 March 1925. The championship began on 5 April 1925 and ended on 23 August 1925.

Blackrock were the defending champions.

On 23 August 1925, Blackrock won the championship following a 6–4 to 2–3 defeat of St. Finbarr's in the final. This was their 17th championship title overall and their second title in succession.

== Team changes ==
=== To Championship ===
Promoted from the Cork Intermediate Hurling Championship

- Passage

== Results ==
=== First round ===
5 April 1925 First round	Castletreasure	2-01 - 6-04	Carrigtwohill	Riverstown

19 April 1925 First round	Blackrock	5-04 - 1-04	Redmonds	Cork Athletic Grounds, Cork
				Referee: P O'Keeffe (Cork)

26 April 1925 First round	University College Cork	0-02 - 8-05	Midleton	Riverstown

26 April 1925 First round	Sarsfields	1-02 - 1-03	Shamrocks	The Mardyke, Cork

10 May 1925 First round	Mallow	1-01 - 5-02	St. Finbarr's	Military Sportsfield, Fermoy
				Referee: P O'Keeffe (Cork)

10 May 1925 First round	Passage	3-08 - 5-04	Cloughduv	Turners Cross, Cork

- Collins received a bye in this round.

=== Second round ===
24 May 1925 Second round	Carrigtwohill	6-02 - 3-00	Midleton	The Mardyke, Cork

31 May 1925 Second round	Collins	2-07 - 8-07	Blackrock	Cork Athletic Grounds, Cork
				Referee: P O'Keeffe (Cork)

14 June 1925 Second round	Shamrocks	2-02 - 4-05	St. Finbarr's	Cork Athletic Grounds, Cork

- Cloughduv received a bye in this round.

=== Semi-finals ===
5 July 1925 Semi-final	Blackrock	7-03 - 2-02	Cloughduv	The Mardyke, Cork

26 July 1925 Semi-final	St. Finbarr's	13-01 - 2-01	Carrigtwohill	The Mardyke, Cork

=== Final ===
23 August 1925 Final	Blackrock	6-04 – 2-03	St. Finbarr’s	Cork Athletic Grounds, Cork
