= Paul O'Connor (hurler) =

Irish hurler

Personal information
- Native name: Pól Ó Conchubhair (Irish)
- Born: 29 March 1963 Cork, Ireland
- Died: 20 September 2012 (aged 49) Cork, Ireland

Sport
- Sport: Hurling
- Position: Midfield
Club
- Years: Club
- Na Piarsigh
Club titles
- Cork titles: 2
Inter-county*
Years	County	Apps (scores)
1986–1992	Cork	6 (0-3)
Inter-county titles
- Munster titles: 0
- All-Irelands: 0
- NHL: 0
- All Stars: 0
- *Inter County team apps and scores correct as of 18:53, 20 September 2012.

Paul O'Connor (29 March 1963 – 20 September 2012) was an Irish hurler who played as a midfielder for the Cork senior team.

O'Connor joined the panel during the 1986 championship and became a regular player over the following three seasons. During that time he failed to claim any honours. He hurled for Cork between 1987 and 1990 but was deprived of an All-Ireland medal after suffering a serious knee injury just months before Cork's famous "double" of the Liam McCarthy and Sam Maguire Cups. But for this serious injury, O'Connor would have been one of the outstanding hurlers of the 1990s.

At club level O'Connor was a two-time county club championship medalist with Na Piarsaigh.

With University College Cork O'Connor won five consecutive Fitzgibbon Cup winners' medals. He is regarded as one of the competition's greatest-ever players.
