= 1916 Cork Senior Hurling Championship =

Annual hurling competition season

- Champions: Midleton (2nd title); Jim O'Connell (captain)
- Runners-up: Shamrocks; Ned Flynn (captain)

The 1916 Cork Senior Hurling Championship was the 29th staging of the Cork Senior Hurling Championship since its establishment by the Cork County Board in 1887.

Redmonds were the defending champions.

On 15 October 1916, Midleton won the championship following a 4–0 to 3–2 defeat of Shamrocks in the final. This was their second championship title overall and their first title in two championship seasons.

== Results ==
=== Final ===
15 October 1916 Final	Midleton	4-00 – 3-02	Shamrocks

=== Miscellaneous ===
- Midleton win their first title on the field.
- Shamrocks qualify for their only final to date.
