= John Murphy (Cork hurler) =

Irish hurler

John ‘Curtis’ Murphy
Personal information
- Native name: Seán Ó Murchú (Irish)
- Nickname: Curtis
- Born: Blackrock, County Cork

Sport
- Sport: Hurling
- Position: Forward
Club
- Years: Club
- Blackrock
Club titles
- Cork titles: 8
Inter-county
- Years: County
- 1880s-1890s: Cork
Inter-county titles
- Munster titles: 1
- All-Irelands: 1

John 'Curtis' Murphy was an Irish sportsman. He played hurling with his local club Blackrock and with the Cork senior inter-county team in the 1880s and 1890s. Murphy captained Cork to All-Ireland victory in 1893.

== Playing career ==
=== Club ===
Murphy played his club hurling with the famous Blackrock club in Cork and enjoyed success. He won his first senior county title in 1887 as ‘the Rockies’ captured the very first Cork county title. Murphy added further county titles to his collection in 1889 and 1891. Blackrock quickly became the standard-bearers in the county and Murphy had further county victories with the famous club in 1893, 1894, 1895, 1897 and 1898.

=== Inter-county ===
Blackrock’s victory in the county championship in 1893 allowed them to represent Cork in the inter-county series. For the second year in-a-row the Cork inter-county team contained a mix of players, including Murphy who, as a Blackrock player, was appointed captain. That year Cork reached the Munster final where Limerick provided the opposition. On that occasion Cork retained their provincial title with a remarkable 5-3 to 0-0 victory, giving Murphy his first, and only, Munster title. The subsequent All-Ireland final pitted Cork against Kilkenny. It was the very first meeting of these two great rivals in the history of the championship. The game was fixed for Ashtown, however, upon arrival both teams refused to play there as somebody had neglected to mow the grass. After a long delay the goalposts were uprooted and both teams and their supporters headed to the Phoenix Park where the game took place after a delay. The game itself turned into a rout as Cork score 6-8 to Kilkenny’s 0-2. It was Cork’s second All-Ireland title in-a-row and it was Murphy’s only one.

Sporting positions
Preceded by Bill O'Callaghan	Cork Senior Hurling Captain; 1893	Succeeded by Stephen Hayes
Achievements
Preceded by Bill O'Callaghan (Cork)	All-Ireland Senior Hurling winning captain 1893	Succeeded by Stephen Hayes (Cork)
