= 1889 Cork Senior Hurling Championship =

Annual hurling competition season

- Champions: Blackrock (2nd title); Stephen Hayes (captain)
- Runners-up: Aghada

The 1889 Cork Senior Hurling Championship was the third staging of the Cork Senior Hurling Championship since its establishment by the Cork County Board in 1887.

Tower St. were the defending champions.

Blackrock won the championship after receiving a walkover from Aghada in the final. This was their second championship title overall and their first in two championship seasons.

== Results ==
Final

Final	Blackrock	w/o – scr.	Aghada
