= Stephen Hayes (hurler) =

Irish hurler

Personal information
- Native name: Stíofán Ó hAodha (Irish)
- Born: 1860 Carrigtwohill, County Cork, Ireland
- Died: 15 September 1929 (aged 69) Douglas Road, Cork, Ireland
- Occupation: Steamship fireman

Sport
- Sport: Hurling
- Position: Forward
Club
- Years: Club
- Blackrock
Club titles
- Cork titles: 5
Inter-county
- Years: County
- 1889-1894: Cork
Inter-county titles
- Munster titles: 1
- All-Irelands: 1

Stephen Hayes (1860 – 15 September 1929) was an Irish hurler. He played with club side Blackrock and at inter-county level with Cork. Hayes captained Cork to a third All-Ireland victory in-a-row in 1894.

== Career ==
Hayes had his first hurling success when the Blackrock Nationals club won the inaugural Cork County Hurling Championship in 1887. It was the first of five such victories in seven seasons, with Hayes captaining the team in 1891 and 1894.

Hayes first played for Cork when he captained the team for the 1899 Munster Championship. He captained the team for a second time during Cork's unsuccessful 1891 campaign. Hayes returned for a third stint as captain when Cork beat Tipperary by 3-04 to 1-02 to win the Munster Championship in 1894. He later captained the team to a 5-20 to 2-00 defeat of Dublin in the 1894 All-Ireland final, in what was a record third successive title for Cork. A dispute with the GAA resulted in Cork withdrawing from the 1895 All-Ireland Championship, a move which brought Hayes's inter-county activity to a close and ended the possibility of the team winning a fourth successive title.

== Personal life and death ==
Hayes was born in Carrigtwohill, County Cork, but later settled in Blackrock where he worked as a steamship fireman. He married Mary Cotter in 1886 and the couple had ten children, seven of whom survived infancy.

Hayes died at the Cork District Hospital on 15 September 1929, at the age of 69.

== Honours ==
Blackrock

- Cork Senior Hurling Championship: 1887, 1889, 1891 (c), 1893, 1894 (c)

Cork

- All-Ireland Senior Hurling Championship: 1894 (c)
- Munster Senior Hurling Championship: 1894 (c)

Sporting positions
Preceded by William Gleeson	Cork Senior Hurling Captain; 1889	Succeeded by Dan Lane
Preceded by Dan Lane	Cork Senior Hurling Captain; 1891	Succeeded by Bill O'Callaghan
Preceded by John 'Curtis' Murphy	Cork Senior Hurling Captain; 1894	Succeeded by
Achievements
Preceded by John 'Curtis' Murphy	All-Ireland SHC Final winning captain 1894	Succeeded by Mikey Maher
