= Graham Callanan =

Irish hurler

Personal information
- Native name: Graham Ó Callanáin (Irish)
- Born: 8 February 1982 (age 44) Blackpool, Cork, Ireland
- Height: 6 ft 2 in (188 cm)

Sport
- Sport: Hurling
- Position: Midfield
Club*
Years	Club	Apps (scores)
1999-present	Glen Rovers	76 (0-37)
Club titles
- Cork titles: 2
Inter-county**
Years	County	Apps (scores)
2004-2009	Cork	4 (0-0)
Inter-county titles
- Munster titles: 1
- All-Irelands: 2
- NHL: 0
- All Stars: 0
- * club appearances and scores correct as of 22:48, 28 January 2019. **Inter County team apps and scores correct as of 22:48, 28 January 2019.

Graham Callanan (born 8 February 1982) is an Irish hurler who plays for Cork Senior Championship club Glen Rovers. He usually plays as a left wing-back but can also be deployed at midfield. Callanan is a former member of the Cork senior hurling team.

== Playing career ==
=== Glen Rovers ===
Callanan joined the Glen Rovers club at a young age and played in all grades at juvenile and underage levels, winning a Cork Under-21 Hurling Championship medal as a 19-year-old in 2001. With Glen's sister club, St. Nicholas', he won a Cork Under-21 Football Championship in 2003.

Callanan joined the Glen Rovers senior team during the 1999 Cork Championship but was an unused substitute throughout the season. He made his first appearance for the team on 14 May 2000 in an 0–11 to 0–18 defeat by Erin's Own.

On 10 October 2010, Callanan lined out at centre-back in Glen Rovers' first Cork Senior Championship final in 19 years, however, Sarsfields won the game by 1–17 to 0–18.

Callanan was appointed captain of the Glen Rovers senior team for the 2014 Cork Senior Championship. On 12 October, he captained the team from left wing-back when the Glen faced Sarsfields in the final. He scored a point during the game, however, Sarsfields won by 2–18 to 0-08.

Callanan retained the club captaincy for the 2015 Cork Senior Championship. On 11 October, he lined out at right wing-back in the final against reigning champions Sarsfields. A 2–17 to 1–13 victory secured the title and a first championship medal for Callanan.

For the third year in-a-row, Callanan was appointed captain of the Glen Rovers team. On 9 October 2016, he was at right wing-back when Glen Rovers defeated Erin's Own by 0–19 to 2–10 to win the Cork Senior Championship for the second year in succession. It was Callanan's second time lifting the cup as captain.

=== Cork ===
==== Minor and under-21 ====
Callanan first played for Cork as a member of the minor team on 6 August 2000 in a 2–17 to 1-11 All-Ireland semi-final defeat of Dublin. On 10 September, he was at left wing-back when Cork suffered a 2–19 to 4–10 defeat by Galway in the All-Ireland final.

On 9 July 2002, Callanan made his first appearance for the Cork under-21 team in a 1–15 to 1-14 Munster Championship semi-final defeat by Limerick. His under-21 tenure ended with a Munster final replay defeat by Tipperary on 3 August 2003.

==== Senior ====
Callanan made his first appearance for the Cork senior hurling team on 22 February 2004 in a 0–14 to 1-09 National Hurling League defeat of Limerick. He was a regular player during all of Cork's eight group stage league games but failed to secure a place on the starting fifteen for the Munster Championship. On 12 September 2004, Callanan was an unused substitute when Cork defeated Kilkenny by 0–17 to 0–09 in the All-Ireland final

On 22 May 2005, Callanan made his first championship appearance as a substitute in a 2–17 to 2–15 defeat of Waterford in the Munster Championship semi-final. He was later an unused substitute when Cork defeated Tipperary by 1–21 to 1–16 to win the Munster Championship. On 11 September, Callanan won his second All-Ireland medal as a non-playing substitute when Cork defeated Galway by 1–21 to 1–16 in the All-Ireland final.

Callanan was dropped from the Cork senior team in 2006 but returned the following year. He made his last appearance for the team on 18 July 2009 when he came on as a substitute in Cork's 1–19 to 0–15 defeat by Galway.

== Career statistics ==
=== Club ===
As of match played 1 September 2018.

Team	Season	Cork		Munster		All-Ireland		Total	
Team	Season	Apps	Score	Apps	Score	Apps	Score	Apps	Score
Glen Rovers	1999-00	0	0-00	—		—		0	0-00
Glen Rovers	2000-01	2	0-01	—		—		2	0-01
Glen Rovers	2001-02	2	0-01	—		—		2	0-01
Glen Rovers	2002-03	2	0-02	—		—		2	0-02
Glen Rovers	2003-04	2	0-01	—		—		2	0-01
Glen Rovers	2004-05	6	0-04	—		—		6	0-04
Glen Rovers	2005-06	3	0-02	—		—		3	0-02
Glen Rovers	2006-07	2	0-03	—		—		2	0-03
Glen Rovers	2007-08	3	0-02	—		—		3	0-02
Glen Rovers	2008-09	5	0-03	—		—		5	0-03
Glen Rovers	2009-10	4	0-02	—		—		4	0-02
Glen Rovers	2010-11	8	0-01	—		—		8	0-01
Glen Rovers	2011-12	2	0-02	—		—		2	0-02
Glen Rovers	2012-13	4	0-01	—		—		4	0-01
Glen Rovers	2013-14	3	0-03	—		—		3	0-03
Glen Rovers	2014-15	6	0-03	—		—		6	0-03
Glen Rovers	2015-16	5	0-01	1	0-01	—		6	0-02
Glen Rovers	2016-17	6	0-00	2	0-00	—		8	0-00
Glen Rovers	2017-18	6	0-04	—		—		6	0-04
Glen Rovers	2018-19	2	0-00	—		—		2	0-00
Career total		73	0-36	3	0-01	—		76	0-37

=== Inter-county ===
Team	Year	National League			Munster		All-Ireland		Total	
Team	Year	Division	Apps	Score	Apps	Score	Apps	Score	Apps	Score
Cork	2004	Division 1B	8	0-00	0	0-00	0	0-00	8	0-00
Cork	2005	Division 1B	6	0-01	1	0-00	0	0-00	7	0-01
Cork	2006	Division 1A	2	0-00	—		—		2	0-00
Cork	2007	Division 1A	1	0-00	0	0-00	1	0-00	2	0-00
Cork	2008	Division 1A	—		—		—		—	
Cork	2009	Division 1A	2	0-01	0	0-00	2	0-00	4	0-01
Career total			19	0-02	1	0-00	3	0-00	23	0-02

== Honours ==
Glen Rovers

- Cork Senior Hurling Championship (2): 2015 (c), 2016 (c)
- Cork Under-21 Hurling Championship (1): 2001

St. Nicholas'

- Cork Under-21 Football Championship (1): 2003

Cork

- All-Ireland Senior Hurling Championship (2): 2004, 2005
- Munster Senior Hurling Championship (1): 2005
- Munster Minor Hurling Championship (1): 2000
