= 1920 Cork Senior Hurling Championship =

Annual hurling competition season

- Champions: Blackrock (15th title)
- Runners-up: Fairhill

The 1920 Cork Senior Hurling Championship was the 33rd staging of the Cork Senior Hurling Championship since its establishment by the Cork County Board in 1887.

St. Finbarr's were the defending champions.

Blackrock won the championship following a 14–4 to 2–0 defeat of Fairhill in the final. This was their 15th championship title overall and their first title in seven championship seasons.

== Results ==
Final

16 July 1922 Final	Blackrock	14-04 – 2-01	Fairhill	Cork Athletic Grounds, Ballintemple

== Championship statistics ==
=== Miscellaneous ===
- Blackrock's winning margin of 40 points is to date the highest win in a final.
- Blackrock win the title for the first time in seven seasons.
- Fairhill qualify for their first, and only, final.
