= 1912 Cork Senior Hurling Championship =

Annual hurling competition season

- Dates: 14 April 1912 – 29 September 1912
- Teams: 10
- Champions: Blackrock (13th title); Andy Buckley (captain)
- Runners-up: Redmonds; Denis O'Keeffe (captain)

The 1912 Cork Senior Hurling Championship was the 25th staging of the Cork Senior Hurling Championship since its establishment by the Cork County Board in 1887. The draw for the opening round fixtures took place on 13 March 1912. The championship began on 14 April 1912 and ended on 29 September 1912.

Blackrock were the defending champions.

On 29 September 1912, Blackrock won the championship following a 4–02 to 0–01 defeat of Redmonds in the final. This was their 13th championship title overall and their third title in succession.

== Results ==
=== First round ===
14 April 1912 First round	Redmonds	5-04 - 3-03	Midleton	Carrigtwohill Sportsfield, Carrigtwohill

5 May 1912 First round	Dungourney	4-03 - 2-00	Carrigtwohill	Midleton Sportsfield, Midleton

5 May 1912 First round	Blackrock	2-01 - 2-01	Cloughduv	Coachford Sportsfield, Coachford
				Referee: T Irwin (Cork Co. Board)

9 June 1912 First round replay	Blackrock	4-04 - 2-01	Cloughduv	Bandon Sportsfield, Bandon
				Referee: T Irwin (Cork Co. Board)

30 June 1912 First round	St. Finbarr's	3-03 - 2-01	St Mary's	Cork Athletic Grounds, Cork
				Referee: T Irwin (Cork Co. Board)

=== Second round ===
18 August 1912 Second round	Redmonds	4-03 - 4-02	Dungourney	Cork Athletic Grounds, Cork
				Referee: T Irwin (Cork Co. Board)

=== Semi-finals ===
11 August 1912 Semi-final	Blackrock	1-07 - 1-02	St. Finbarr's	Cork Athletic Grounds, Cork
				Referee: T Iriwn (Cork Co. Board)

8 September 1912 Semi-final	Redmonds	2-02 - 1-03	Sarsfields	Cork Athletic Grounds, Cork
				Referee: T Iriwn (Cork Co. Board)

=== Final ===
29 September 1912 Final	Blackrock	4-02 – 0-01	Redmonds	Cork Athletic Grounds, Cork
				Referee: T Iriwn (Cork Co. Board)
