= 1897 Cork Senior Hurling Championship =

Annual hurling competition season

- Champions: Blackrock (7th title); Pat Coughlan (captain)
- Runners-up: Aghada; R. Geary (captain)

The 1897 Cork Senior Hurling Championship was the 11th staging of the Cork Senior Hurling Championship since its establishment by the Cork County Board in 1887.

Ballyhea were the defending champions, however, they were defeated by Blackrock.

On 19 September 1897, Blackrock won the championship following a 5–8 to 0–0 defeat of Aghada in the final. This was their seventh championship title overall and their first in two championship seasons.

== Results ==
Final

19 September 1897 Final	Blackrock	5-08 – 0-00	Aghada	Cork Park
