= 1904 Cork Senior Hurling Championship =

Annual hurling competition season

- Champions: St. Finbarr’s (2nd title); Dan Harrington (captain)
- Runners-up: Castletownroche

The 1904 Cork Senior Hurling Championship was the 18th staging of the Cork Senior Hurling Championship since its establishment by the Cork County Board in 1887.

Blackrock were the defending champions.

St. Finbarr's won the championship following a walkover from Castletownroche in the final. This was their second championship title overall and their first title in five championship seasons.

== Results ==
Final

Final	St. Finbarr’s	w/o – scr.	Castletownroche
