= 1895 Cork Senior Hurling Championship =

Annual hurling competition season

- Champions: Blackrock (6th title); Pat Coughlan (captain)
- Runners-up: Ballyhea; Jerh Murphy (captain)

The 1895 Cork Senior Hurling Championship was the ninth staging of the Cork Senior Hurling Championship since its establishment by the Cork County Board in 1887.

Blackrock were the defending champions.

On 3 November 1895, Blackrock won the championship following a 1–02 to 1–01 defeat of Ballyhea in the final. This was their sixth championship title and their third title in succession.

== Results ==
Final

3 November 1895 Final	Blackrock	1-02 – 1-01	Ballyhea	Mallow Town Park, Mallow

== Championship statistics ==
=== Miscellaneous ===
- Blackrock become the first team to win three successive championships.
- Ballyhea qualify for the final for the first time.
