= 1924 Cork Senior Hurling Championship =

Annual hurling competition season

- Dates: 6 April 1924 – 26 October 1924
- Teams: 14
- Champions: Blackrock (16th title); Seán Óg Murphy (captain)
- Runners-up: Redmonds

Tournament statistics
- Matches played: 12
- Goals scored: 75 (6.25 per match)
- Points scored: 76 (6.33 per match)

The 1924 Cork Senior Hurling Championship was the 36th staging of the Cork Senior Hurling Championship since its establishment by the Cork County Board in 1887. The championship began on 6 April 1924 and ended on 26 October 1924.

St. Finbarr's were the defending champions.

On 26 October 1924, Blackrock won the championship following a 3–5 to 1–2 defeat of Redmonds in the final. This was their 16th championship title overall and their first title in four years.

== Team changes ==
=== To Championship ===
Promoted from the Cork Intermediate Hurling Championship

- Mallow

== Results ==
=== First round ===
6 April 1924 First round	St Mary's	4-03 - 3-03	Collegians	Cork Athletic Grounds, Cork

20 April 1924 First round	Mallow	5-01 - 3-00	Midleton	Military Sportsfield, Fermoy

20 April 1924 First round	Shamrocks	3-04 - 1-05	Cloughduv	Cork Athletic Grounds, Cork

20 April 1924 First round	Redmonds	6-03 - 3-03	Sarsfields	Cork Athletic Grounds, Cork

11 May 1924 First round	Castletreasure	w/o - scr.	Cork Command	Turners Cross, Cork

25 May 1924 First round	Blackrock	3-07 - 1-01	St. Finbarr's	Cork Athletic Grounds, Cork

25 May 1924 First round	Carrigtwohill	6-03 - 4-04	Kinsale	Cork Athletic Grounds, Cork

=== Second round ===
Second round	Blackrock	w/o - scr.	St Mary's

29 June 1924 Second round	Redmonds	6-03 - 0-01	Carrigtwohill	Turners Cross, Cork

20 July 1924 Second round	Shamrocks	5-08 - 1-02	Castletreasure	Cork Athletic Grounds, Cork

- Mallow received a bye in this round.

=== Semi-finals ===
20 July 1924 Semi-final	Blackrock	2-04 - 0-01	Mallow	Cork Athletic Grounds, Cork

24 August 1924 Semi-final	Redmonds	5-03 - 5-03	Shamrocks	Cork Athletic Grounds, Cork

28 September 1924 Semi-final replay	Redmonds	4-03 - 1-04	Shamrocks	Cork Athletic Grounds, Cork

=== Final ===
26 October 1924 Final	Blackrock	3-05 – 1-02	Redmonds	Cork Athletic Grounds, Cork

== Championship statistics ==
=== Miscellaneous ===
- The attendance of 12,889 at the Blackrock-St. Finbarr's and Carrigtwohill-Kinsale double header was a record for a championship match.
- Redmonds qualify for the final for the first time since 1917.
