= 1913 Cork Senior Hurling Championship =

Annual hurling competition season

- Champions: Blackrock (14th title); Barry Murphy (captain)
- Runners-up: Midleton; Gerald O'Shea (captain)

The 1913 Cork Senior Hurling Championship was the 26th staging of the Cork Senior Hurling Championship since its establishment by the Cork County Board in 1887.

Blackrock were the defending champions.

On 30 November 1913, Blackrock won the championship following a 3–3 to 2–3 defeat of Midleton in the final. This was their 14th championship title overall and their fourth title in succession.

== Team changes ==
=== To Championship ===
Promoted from the Cork Intermediate Hurling Championship

- Ballincollig

== Results ==
=== First round ===
13 April 1913 First round	Sarsfields	0-03 – 3-01	Carrigtwohill	Cork Athletic Grounds

20 April 1913 First round	Redmonds	4-00 – 5-01	Cloughduv	Cork Athletic Grounds

27 April 1913 First round	Collegians	6-03 – 1-02	Aghabullogue	Cork Athletic Grounds

4 May 1913 First round	Midleton	3-03 – 2-04	Dungourney	Carrigtwohill Enclosure

18 May 1913 First round	Blackrock	2-07 – 0-02	St Mary's	Cork Athletic Grounds

18 May 1913 First round	St. Finbarr's	5-06 – 0-00	Ballincollig	Cork Athletic Grounds

=== Second round ===
27 July 1913 Second round	Carrigtwohill	3-01 – 2-01	Collegians	Riverstown Sportsfield

=== Semi-finals ===
17 August 1913 Semi-final	Midleton	3-00 – 0-04 (declared void)	St. Finbarr's	Cork Athletic Grounds

19 October 1913 Semi-final replay	Midleton	5-03 – 0-02	St. Finbarr's	Cork Athletic Grounds

9 November 1913 Semi-final	Blackrock	3-02 – 2-01	Carrigtwohill	Fermoy Sportsfield

=== Final ===
30 November 1913 Final	Blackrock	3-03 – 2-03	Midleton	Cork Athletic Grounds
				Referee: T Irwin (Cork Co. Board)

== Championship statistics ==
=== Miscellaneous ===
- Blackrock became the first team to win four successive championship titles. It was a record which stood for 25 years until 1938 when Glen Rovers won five-in-a-row.
