= 1894 Cork Senior Hurling Championship =

Annual hurling competition season

- Champions: Blackrock (5th title); Stephen Hayes (captain)
- Runners-up: Blarney

The 1894 Cork Senior Hurling Championship was the eighth staging of the Cork Senior Hurling Championship since its establishment by the Cork County Board in 1887.

Blackrock were the defending champions.

On 2 September 1894, Blackrock won the championship following a 1–5 to 0–2 defeat of Blarney in the final. This was their fifth championship title and their second title in succession.

== Results ==
Final

2 September 1894 Final	Blackrock	1-05 – 0-02	Blarney	Cork Park

== Championship statistics ==
=== Miscellaneous ===
- Blackrock become the first team to retain the championship.
- Following their county championship success, Blackrock represent Cork in the inter-county championship. They become the fourth Cork team to win the All-Ireland title.
- Blarney qualify for the final for the first time.
