= Cork Premier Senior Hurling Championship =

Annual hurling competition in Ireland

- Current season or competition: 2026 Cork Premier Senior Hurling Championship
- Irish: Craobh Iomána Sinsearach Chorcaí
- Code: Hurling
- Founded: 1887; 139 years ago (rebranded in 2020)
- Region: Cork (GAA)
- Trophy: Seán Óg Murphy Cup
- No. of teams: 12 (group stage); 6 (divisional qualifying round)
- Title holders: Glen Rovers (28th title)
- Most titles: Blackrock (33 titles)
- Sponsors: Co-Op Superstores
- TV partner(s): TG4, RTÉ
- Official website: Cork GAA

The Cork Premier Senior Hurling Championship (known for sponsorship reasons as the Co-Op Superstores Cork Premier Senior Hurling Championship and abbreviated to the Cork PSHC) is an annual club hurling competition organised by the Cork County Board of the Gaelic Athletic Association and contested by the top-ranking senior clubs and amalgamated teams in the county of Cork in Ireland, deciding the competition winners through a group and knockout format. It is the most prestigious competition in Cork hurling.

Introduced in 1887 as the Cork Senior Hurling Championship, it was initially a straight knockout tournament open only to senior-ranking club teams, with its winner reckoned as the Cork county champion. The competition took on its current name in 2020, adding a round-robin group stage and limiting the number of club and divisional entrants.

In its present format, the Cork Premier Senior Championship begins with a preliminary qualifying round for the divisional teams and educational institutions. The sole surviving team from this stage automatically qualified for the knockout phase. The 12 club teams are drawn into three groups of four teams and play each other in a single round-robin system. The three group winners and three runners-up proceed to the knockout phase that culminates with the final match at Páirc Uí Chaoimh in October. The winner of the Cork Premier Senior Championship, as well as being presented with the Seán Óg Murphy Cup, qualifies for the subsequent Munster Club Championship. In 2020, the intended format was disrupted and slightly amended due to the impact of the COVID-19 pandemic.

The competition has been won by 19 teams, 14 of which have won it more than once. Blackrock is the most successful team in the tournament's history, having won it 33 times. Glen Rovers are the reigning champions, having beaten St Finbarr's by 2-20 to 0-23 in the 2026 final.

== History ==
=== 19th century ===
Following the foundation of the Gaelic Athletic Association in 1884, new rules for Gaelic football and hurling were drawn up and published in the United Irishman newspaper. Throughout 1886, county committees were established, with the Cork County Board affiliating on 19 December 1886. Plans to hold championships in both hurling and football were drawn up over the following weeks, with an advert inviting teams to enter appearing in the Cork Examiner on 15 January 1887. The cost of entering a team was 2s 6d and the closing date for entries was 29 January 1887. The championship draw took place at 23 Maylor Street on the day after the closing date and "the utmost good feeling was displayed, and...the contesting parties were agreeably satisfied" as the draw took place. 22 teams from 20 clubs entered. Agahda and Cork National Hurling Club each entered two teams, while Aghabullogue, Ballinhassig, Ballygarvan, Blarney, Carrignavar, Charleville, Douglas, Evergreen Road, Glasheen, Inniscarra, Little Island, Mogeely, Monkstown, Passage, Quarry Road, St. Finbarr's, St Mary's and Tower Street each entered one team.

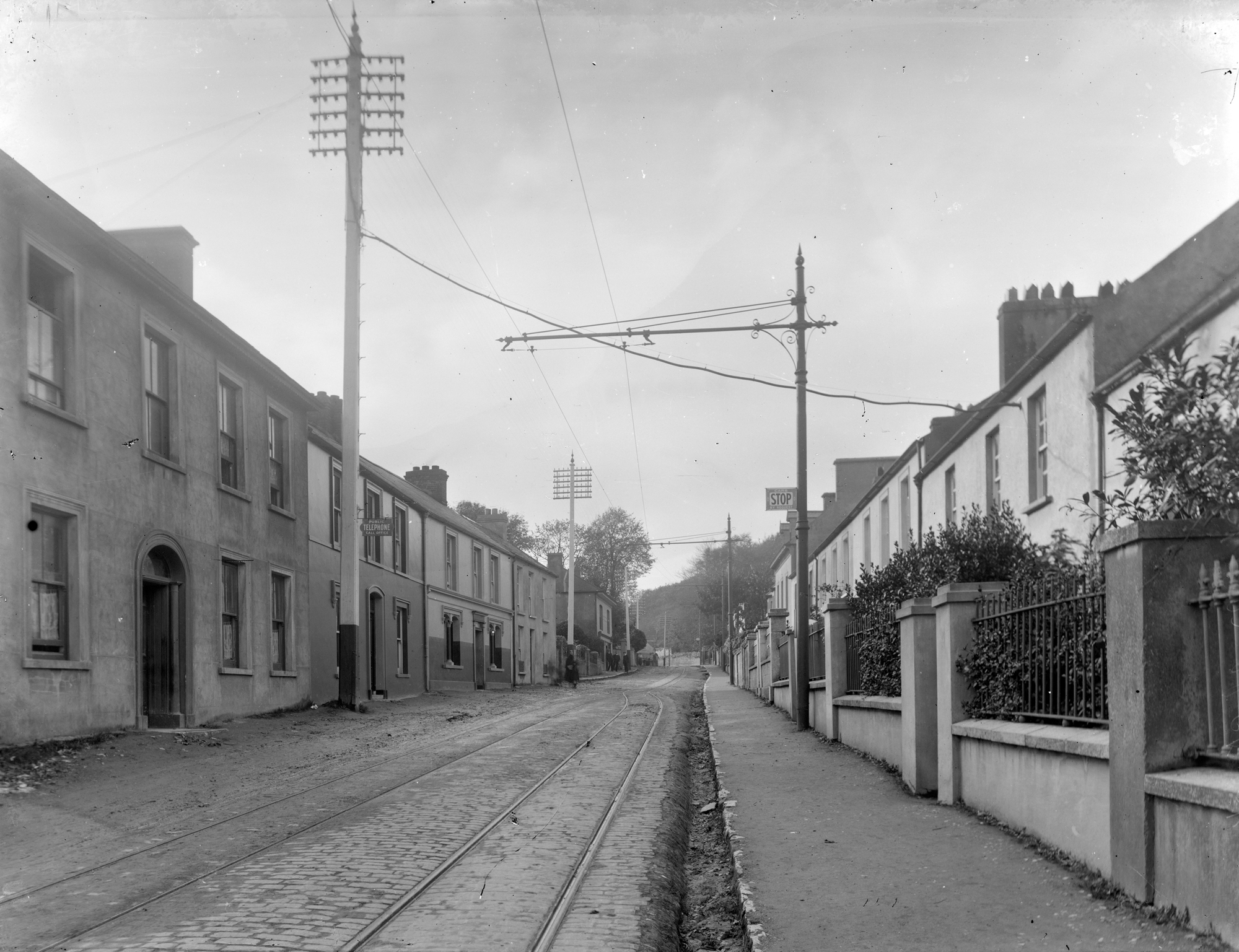
Blackrock at the turn of the 20th century. Their hurling dominance at county and national level led to the area being nicknamed the "home of hurling".

All of the matches in the inaugural championship took place at a special enclosure in Cork City Park, with the first match taking place "in the presence of several thousand persons" at 2;30 pm on 6 March 1887. Mr. J. E. Kennedy acted as referee and Messrs E. Cotter and W. Sheehan performed the duties of goal umpires. Glasheen beat Cork National Hurling Club's 2nd 21 by 1-02 to no score. The championship progressed as matches continued throughout the summer, however, the final stages ended in disarray. The semi-final between Cork Nationals Hurling Club 1st 21 and St. Finbarr's ended after twenty minutes when both sides and the match officials disagreed over the awarding of a point. An emergency meeting of the Cork County Committee was held with representatives from Passage Hurling Club, St. Finbarr's and the Cork Nationals being brought before the meeting. After some discussion, the Passage Hurling Club agreed to withdraw from the championship. St. Finbarr's agreed to a proposal that lots be drawn between themselves and the Cork Nationals to decide who would represent Cork in the 1887 All-Ireland Championship. The Cork Nationals rejected the idea, however, they were later awarded the championship.

The 1888 championship saw an increase in the number of participating teams to 35. In an effort to cut down on travel costs for clubs, the County Board adopted a divisional structure to the championship. The participating teams were divided into six divisions along geographic lines; Cork City, East Cork, Mid Cork, North Cork, North-East Cork and South Cork. There were no hurling clubs in West Cork. The six divisional champions qualified for the county-wide series of games. The first final to be played took place on 29 April 1888, with Tower Street beating Ballygarvan by 4-01 to 0-01. Tower Street later went on to win the very first Munster Championship as the Cork representatives.

Towards the end of 1888, a serious split in the Association in Cork lead to the existence of three rival and distinct county boards. 40 clubs left the official board and affiliated to the Cork Board, under the presidency of Fr. O'Connor, and the O'Brien Board under the presidency of Fr. Carver. These three boards ran their own separate championships over the following two seasons, however, the Cork County Board remained as the official administrative branch of the GAA. In 1890, Aghabullogue, as official county champions, became the first Cork representatives to win the All-Ireland Championship. The three individual boards unified under the banner of the Cork County Board in 1891, with the championship continuing to be run on a divisional basis. There was such intense interest in the championship that year amongst the general public that it was reported in The Nation newspaper that the attendance of 16,000 at the Blackrock-St. Finbarr's game set a new attendance record for a hurling game in the whole of Ireland. The championship reverted to a straight knock-out format in 1892. 14 teams from 10 clubs entered, with the first and second teams being separated in the draw.

=== 20th century ===
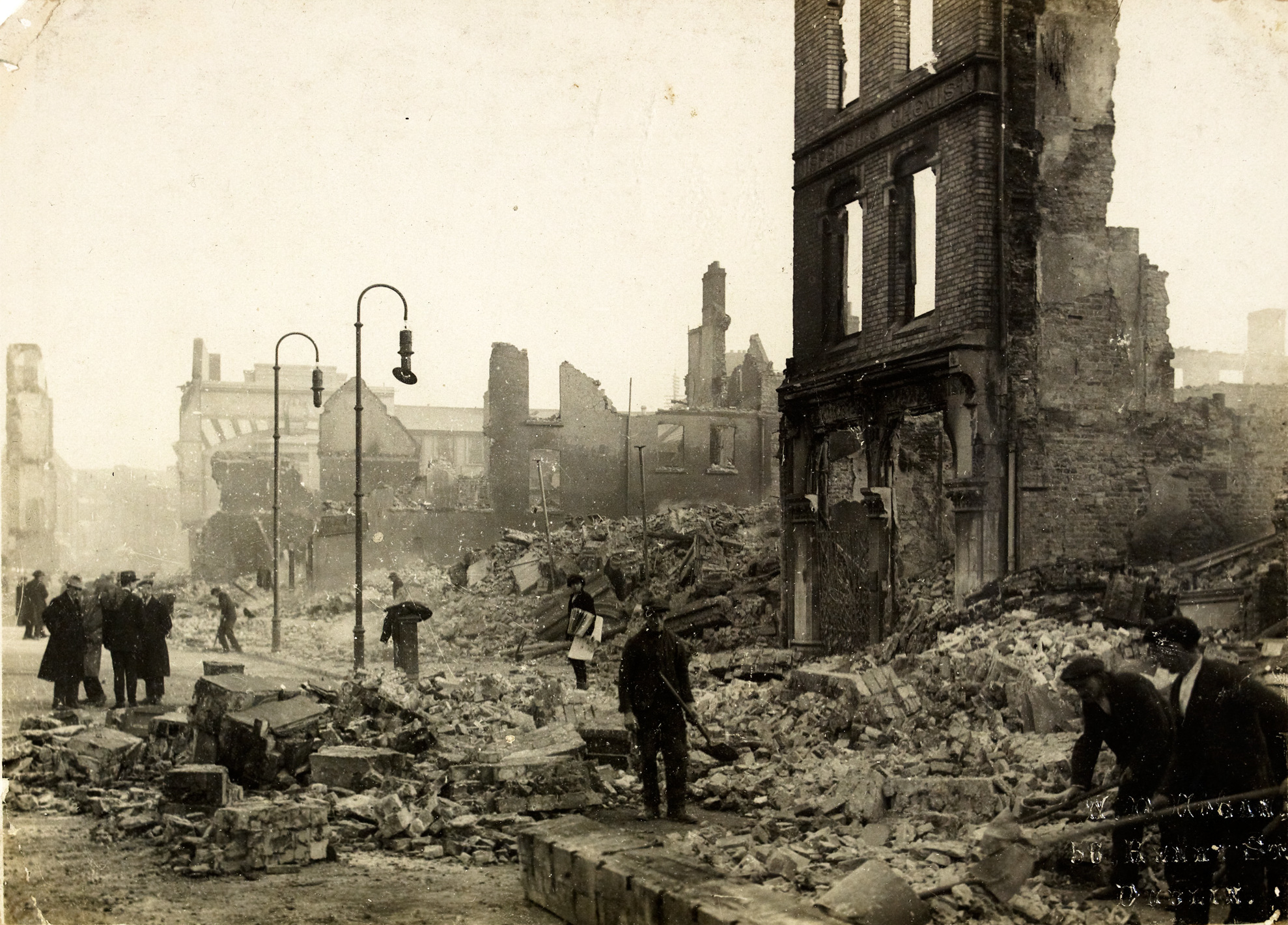
Civil unrest following the burning of Cork during the War of Independence led to the 1921 championship being cancelled.

A delay in the 1904 championship meant that the 1905 championship never took place. In spite of this, St. Finbarr's were subsequently awarded the title after beating Ballymartle in the 1906 final. On 26 January 1908, the newly built Cork Athletic Grounds hosted the final for the very first time. It remained as the regular final venue for the following 67 years. The War of Independence (1919-1921) saw Cork take a prominent role, something which had an adverse effect on the smooth running of the championships. Civil unrest following a series of events, including the murder of Lord Mayor Tomás Mac Curtain, the death from hunger strike of Lord Mayor Terence MacSwiney and the burning of Cork at the height of the war, resulted in the 1920 championship being delayed by two years and the entire cancellation of the 1921 championship.

The first decades of the new century brought new teams but not in a traditional sense. Food production company Crosse & Blackwell, third level educational institution University College Cork (UCC) and Collins Military Barracks all entered teams, however, UCC are the only team to continue fielding a team as of 2020. The creation of the divisional boards in the late 1920s added a new dimension to the championship. These divisional teams were composed of junior and intermediate players and afforded every player in the county the chance of winning a senior championship medal. Avondhu, Carbery and Muskerry became the first divisions to enter teams when they did so in the 1933 championship.

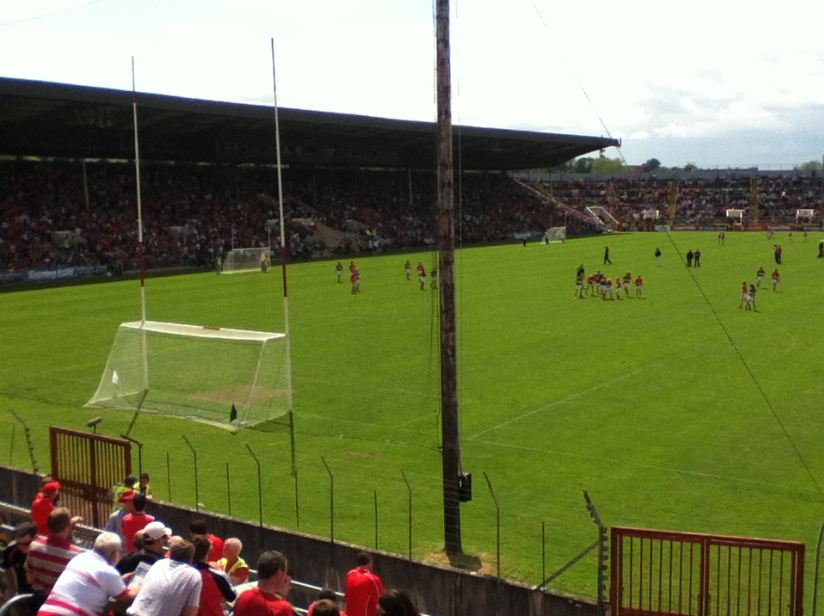
The old Páirc Uí Chaoimh hosted the finals from 1976 to 2014.

On 20 August 1976, Glen Rovers defeated Seandún by 4-10 to 1-06 in the first senior championship game to take place at the newly built Páirc Uí Chaoimh. The 1976 final later became the first final to be played at the new stadium. The Mardyke hosted the two previous finals due to the demolition of the old Athletic Grounds.

After 90 years of using the single-elimination straight knock-out format, problems arose regarding the standard of the competing teams. A special committee was established to examine the possibility of restructuring the championship format. At the County Convention on 5 February 1978, delegates voted by 143 to 93 in favour of abandoning the knock-out format and adopting a group stage. This format was used for three successive season from 1978 until 1980, with Blackrock and St. Finbarr's becoming the first teams to win the championship after suffering a defeat. The County Board voted to revert to the single-elimination straight knock-out format in 1981.

In 1995, Cork Regional Technical College were permitted to field a team in the championship for the first time.

=== 21st century ===
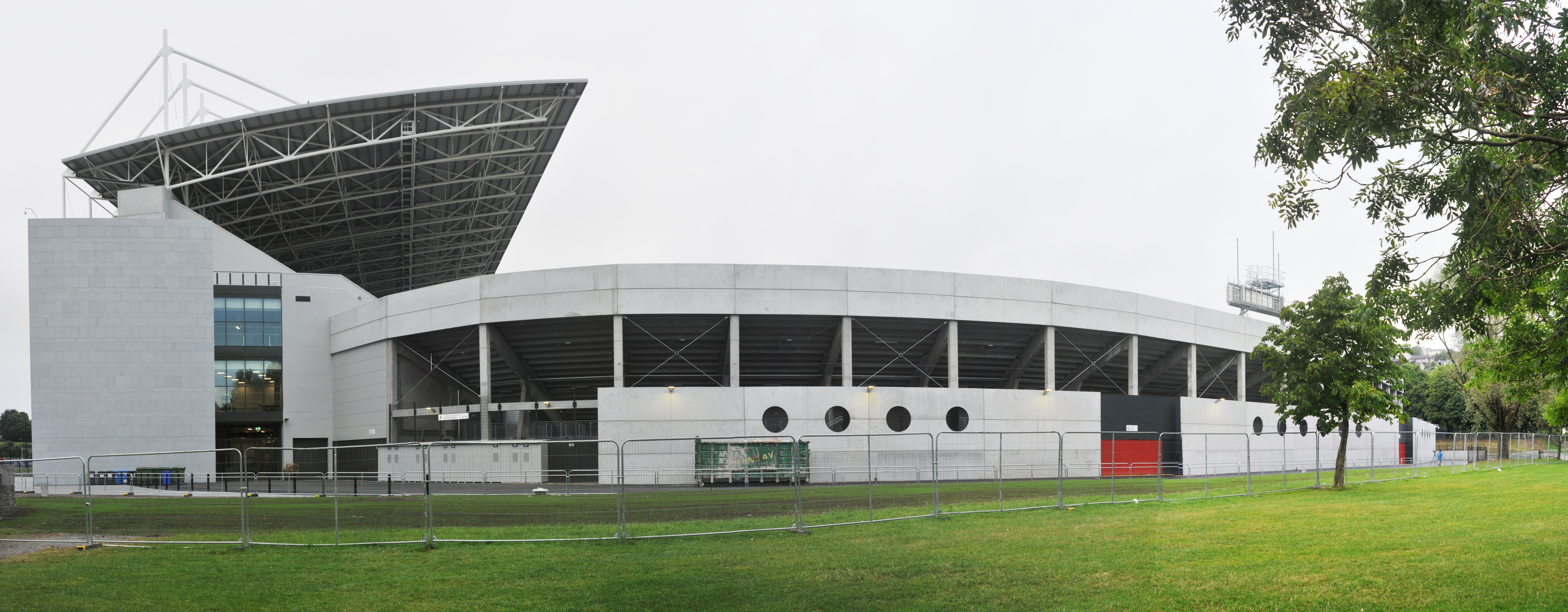
The redeveloped Páirc Uí Chaoimh became the regular final venue in 2017.

The introduction of a "back door" system at inter-county level in the All-Ireland Championship in 1997 led to the idea of introducing a second chance for defeated teams at county level. In 2000 a double-elimination format was introduced which afforded all club teams a second chance by remaining in the championship after a first-round defeat. In the two decades that followed the championship format continued to evolve with a number of minor tweaks. The provision of a second chance for defeated teams was later expanded to allow teams the opportunity of being defeated twice and still remain in the championship. The splitting of the intermediate grade in two resulted in the introduction of relegation in 2006, with Delanys becoming the first team to be relegated that year. Prior to this teams were allowed to decide for themselves if they wanted to regrade or retain their senior status. In 2015 the championship once again reverted to a double-elimination format. Since 2020 the championship start with a group stage and concludes with a single-elimination knock-out phase.

Redevelopment of Páirc Uí Chaoimh saw the final played outside of its regular venue for the first time in nearly 40 years, with the 2015 and 2016 finals being played at Páirc Uí Rinn.

== Domination, shock victories and rivalries ==
=== Team dominance ===
Since the beginning the championship has been dominated by Blackrock, St. Finbarr's and Glen Rovers who are collectively known as the "big three". They have won a combined total of 84 championship titles. Blackrock dominated the first thirty years of the championship, winning 15 titles between 1887 and 1920. It was during this time that the county championship earned the nickname of the "little All-Ireland" due to its competitive nature. St. Finbarr's, after making a breakthrough in the early years of the 20th century, were the team of the decade for the 1920s before regularly claiming championship titles in each of the decades that followed. Glen Rovers made their own breakthrough with a first championship in 1934 and were the dominant club from then until the 1960s. Between 1971 and 1982, the "big three" shared every available championship title. Their rivalry reached its peak in the 1977 final when a record attendance of 34,151 saw St. Finbarr's defeat Glen Rovers.

Since that zenith the "big three" have only claimed two titles in each of the decades from 1990 to 2019 as the power base of Cork hurling has moved from the city to the county with several clubs making significant breakthroughs and impacts on the championship. In 1983 Midleton broke the decade-long hegemony and went on to claim five championships over a thirty-year period to 2013. In 1990 Na Piarsaigh became the first city club outside of the "big three" since Redmonds in 1917 to claim the championship. They added two more titles in 1995 and 2004. Erin's Own also added their name to the roll of honour in 1992 before winning further titles in 2006 and 2007. The mid nineties saw the rise of the divisional sides, with Carbery, Avondhu and Imokilly claiming four championship titles between 1994 and 1998. The success of Newtownshandrum between 2000 and 2009 also highlighted the changing demographics of Cork hurling as the tiny parish of 800 people won four championships during that decade. Sarsfields, although close in proximity to the city but based in the East Cork division, ended a 51-year famine in 2008 by claiming their third championship title ever. Between 2008 and 2015 they appeared in seven finals and won four titles. The East Cork village of Carrigtwohill ended a 93-wait for their second championship title in 2011.

In recent decades many rural and city-based clubs have also contested championship deciders without making a successful breakthrough. These include Ballyhea, Cloyne, Bride Rovers and Bishopstown. Educational institutions like University College Cork and Cork Institute of Technology have also appeared in finals.

=== Historic results ===
My tale is not of murder foul,
or prisoners in the dock.
But 'tis the story of the glorious day
when Mallow bate Blackrock.

— When Mallow bate Blackrock.

The possibility of unlikely victories at any stage of the championship, where a so-called "minnow" beat a traditionally higher placed opposition, is much anticipated by the public. Such upsets and shock results are considered an integral part of the tradition and prestige of the championship and, in some cases, can lead to the championship race being blown wide open. Historically speaking, the biggest shock of the first 50 years of the championship took place when Mallow beat 18-time and reigning champions Blackrock in the 1928 second round. The great run of success by Glen Rovers, who secured eight championship titles in succession between 1934 and 1941, was ended in the semi-final by Ballincollig, a team who had never won the championship and had been beaten by the Glen in the previous year's final. In the 1994 final, Carbery, a division where Gaelic football dominated, beat Midleton to take the title. The latter stages of the 2011 championship featured a number of shock results, including the Cork Institute of Technology beating Newtownshandrum by 14 points and Carrigtwohill beating Midleton before going on to win their first title in 93 years. University College Cork's 1-23 to 1-20 defeat of four-in-a-row hopefuls Imokilly in the 2020 championship was the most recent shock result.

=== Rivalries ===
Matches between keen rivals in the championship are often heated and tension-filled affairs. However, the matches and the rivalries they encompass are frequently listed among the best in the championship. Rivalries can stem from a number of reasons, including the geographic proximity of the teams involved and the glory of "beating the neighbours" to an urban-rural rivalry between teams. In Cork city the River Lee often leads to a northside-southside rivalry.

Some of the more prominent rivalries include:

- Sarsfields-Midleton
- Blackrock–Glen Rovers
- Blackrock–St Finbarr's
- Glen Rovers–Na Piarsaigh
- Glen Rovers–St Finbarr's

== Format ==
=== History ===
In the 131 championships prior to 2020, many different championship formats were used. These include straight knockout, divisional formats, group stages, double-elimination and triple-elimination. On 2 April 2019, a majority of 136 club delegates voted to restructure the championship. The new format led to the splitting of the championship in two and the creation of the Cork Premier Senior Championship and the Cork Senior A Championship.

=== Current ===
Group stage: The 12 club teams are divided into three groups of four. Over the course of the group stage, each team plays once against the others in the group, resulting in each team being guaranteed at least three games. Two points are awarded for a win, one for a draw and zero for a loss. The teams are ranked in the group stage table by points gained, then scoring difference and then their head-to-head record. The top two teams in each group are then ranked 1-6 with the top team receiving a bye to the semi-finals and the teams ranked 2-6 progressing to the quarter-finals.

Divisional and colleges section: The colleges and divisional sides compete in a separate section, with one team qualifying for the quarter-finals.

Quarter-finals: The three quarter-finals feature the teams ranked 2-6 from the group stage and the divisional/colleges section winner. Three teams qualify for the next round.

Semi-finals: The two semi-finals feature four teams; the three quarter-final winners and the top-ranked team from the group stage. Two teams qualify for the next round.

Final: The two semi-final winners contest the final. The winning team are declared champions.

== Teams ==
=== 2027 teams ===
21 teams are eligible to compete in the 2027 Cork Premier Senior Hurling Championship: 12 clubs in the group stage and 9 teams in the divisional/colleges section.

Team	Location	Club / Division	Club's division side	Colours	Position in 2026	In championship since	Championship titles	Last championship title
Avondhu	North Cork	Division	—N/a	Black and yellow	—	2027	3	1996
Blackrock	Blackrock	Club	Seandún	Green and gold	Group stage	1887	33	2020
Bride Rovers	Rathcormac, Bartlemy	Club	Imokilly	Green White & Gold	Group stage	2026	0	—N/a
Carbery	West Cork	Division	—N/a	Purple with gold hoop	Divisional/colleges Round 2	2022	1	1994
Carrigdhoun	South-East Cork	Division	—N/a	Black and gold strip	—	2027	0	—N/a
Charleville	Charleville	Club	Avondhu	Red and white	Quarter-finals	2021	0	—N/a
Duhallow	Duhallow	Division	—N/a	Orange and black	Group stage	1982	0	—N/a
Erin's Own	Caherlag	Club	Imokilly	Blue and red	Senior A champions	2027	3	2007
Fr O'Neill's	Ballymacoda, Ladysbridge	Club	Imokilly	Green and red	Relegation Final	2023	0	—N/a
Glen Rovers	Blackpool	Club	Seandún	Green, black and gold	Winners	2025	28	2026
Imokilly	East Cork	Division	—N/a	Red and white	Quarter-finals	1979	6	2024
Kanturk	Kanturk	Club	Duhallow	Green and white	Semi-finals	2022	0	—N/a
Midleton	Midleton	Club	Imokilly	Black and white	Semi-finals	1979	8	2021
MTU Cork	Bishopstown	Division	—N/a	Red and white	—	2027	0	—N/a
Muskerry	Muskerry	Division	—N/a	White and green	Divisional/colleges semi-finals	2021	0	—N/a
Newcestown	Newcestown	Club	Carbery	Red and gold	Group stage	2024	0	—N/a
Newtownshandrum	Newtownshandrum	Club	Avondhu	Green and gold	Group stage	1997	4	2009
Sarsfields	Glanmire	Club	Imokilly	Black, blue and white	Quarter-finals	1925	8	2025
Seandún	Cork City	Division	—N/a	Red and white	Divisional/colleges runners-up	2026	0	—N/a
St Finbarr's	Togher	Club	Seandún	Royal Blue and Gold	Runners-up	1887	26	2022
University College Cork	College Road	Division	—N/a	Red and black	Divisional/colleges semi-finals	1989	2	1970

=== Clubs that eligible for divisional teams ===
Division	Clubs eligible for divisional team
Avondhu	Araglen, Ballyclough, Ballygiblin, Ballyhooly, Buttevant, Castletownroche, Clyda Rovers, Doneraile, Dromina, Fermoy, Harbour Rovers, Kildorrery, Killavullen, Kilshannig, Kilworth, Liscarroll Churchtown Gaels, Mallow, Milford, Shanballymore
Carbery	Argideen Rangers, Ballinascarthy, Bandon, Bantry Blues, Barryroe, Clonakilty, Diarmuid Ó Mathúna's, Dohenys, Gabriel Rangers, Kilbree, Kilbrittain, O'Donovan Rossa, Randal Óg, St Colum's, St. James, St Mary's, St Oliver Plunkett's
Carrigdhoun	Ballygarvan, Ballymartle, Belgooly, Carrigaline, Crosshaven, Kinsale, Shamrocks, Tracton, Valley Rovers
Duhallow	Banteer, Castlemagner, Dromtarriffe, Freemount, Kilbrin, Lismire, Meelin, Millstreet, Newmarket, Tullylease
Imokilly	Aghada, Ballinacurra, Carrignavar, Castlemartyr, Cloyne, Cobh, Dungourney, Lisgoold, Russell Rovers, St. Catherine's, St. Ita's, Youghal
Muskerry	Aghabullogue, Ballinora, Cloughduv, Donoughmore, Dripsey, Éire Óg, Grenagh, Gleann na Laoi, Iveleary, Kilmichael, Laochra Óg
Seandún	Ballinure, Bishopstown, Brian Dillons, Delaneys, Lough Rovers, Mayfield, Nemo Rangers, Passage West, Rathpeacon, St. Vincent's, Whitechurch, White's Cross

== Sponsorship ==
TSB Bank became the first title sponsor of the championship, serving in that capacity until 2005 when the Evening Echo signed a sponsorship deal. In 2020, Dairygold Co-Op Superstores were unveiled as the new title sponsor of the Cork Premier Senior Championship.

== Qualification for subsequent competitions ==
The Cork Premier Senior Hurling Championship winners qualify for the subsequent Munster Senior Club Hurling Championship. This place is reserved for club teams only as divisional and amalgamated teams are not allowed in the provincial championship. If a divisional side wins the Cork Championship then the runners-up qualify for the Munster Championship. This has occurred on six occasions. If two divisional sides qualify for the final then the provincial championship place is given to one of the defeated semi-finalists. This occurred in 1996 when Na Piarsaigh represented Cork due to Avondhu and Imokilly contesting the final.

== Venues ==
=== Group stage ===
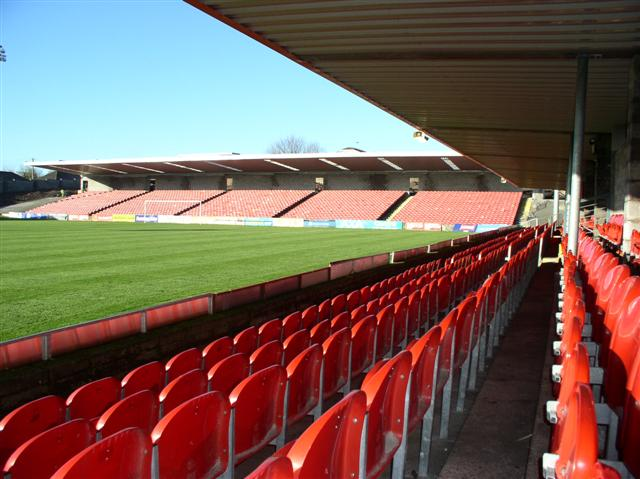
Turners Cross, better known as an association football stadium, hosted three successive finals between 1901 and 1903.

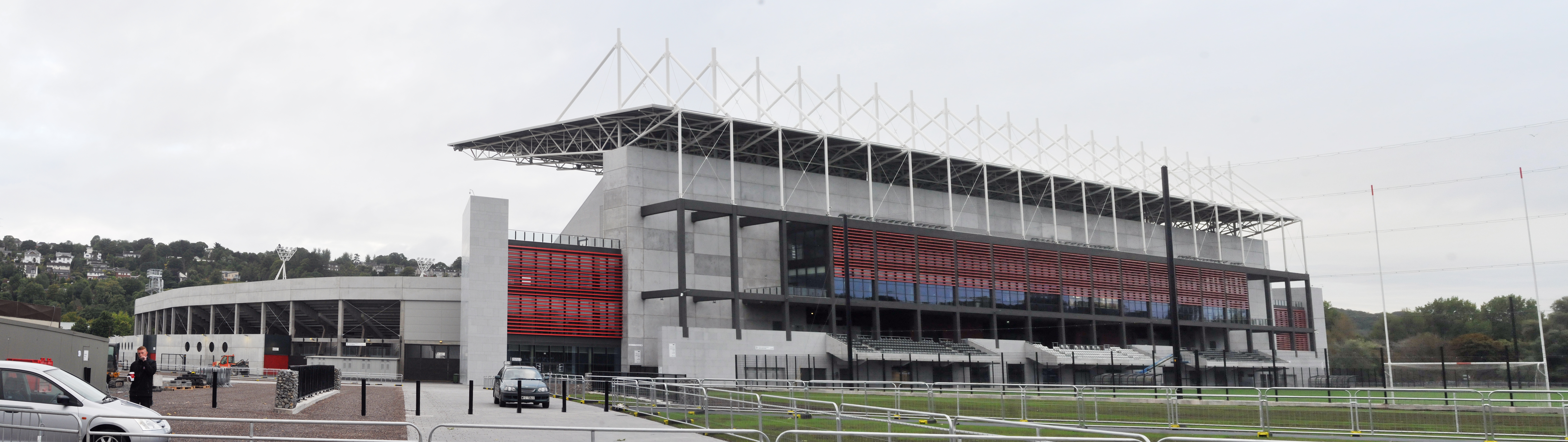
Since 2017 the county final has been held at Páirc Uí Chaoimh, on the site of the previous stadium which hosted it from 1976 to 2014.

Fixtures in the group stage of the championship are usually played at a neutral venue that is deemed halfway between the participating teams. Some of the more common venues include Mallow GAA Complex, Brinny Sportsfield, Coachford Pitch and Clonmult Memorial Park. All games in the knockout stage are played at either Páirc Uí Rinn or Páirc Uí Chaoimh.

=== Final ===
The final has been played at the rebuilt Páirc Uí Chaoimh since it opened in 2017. The rebuilding process meant that the finals of 2015 and 2016 were hosted at Páirc Uí Rinn. Continuing work on the pitch at the new stadium resulted in the 2019 final also being played at Páirc Uí Rinn. Prior to rebuilding, the final was hosted by the original Páirc Uí Chaoimh since it opened in 1976. The final was played at the Mardyke in 1974 and 1975, while in the 70 years prior to the development of Páirc Uí Chaoimh the final was usually played at the Cork Athletic Grounds. From the inaugural championship in 1887 up to the turn of the 20th century, the final was held at a variety of venues in the city and around the county, most notably the Cork Park enclosure. The other venues used during this period include:

- Blarney Sportsfield (1890)
- Mallow Town Park (1891, 1895-1896, 1914)
- Carrigtwohill Sportsfield (1900)
- Turners Cross (1901-1903)
- Ballinhassig Sportsfield (1906)
- Carrignafoy Ground (1908)
- Riverstown Sportsfield (1911)

== Managers ==
Managers in the Cork Championship are involved in the day-to-day running of the team, including the training, team selection, and sourcing of players. Their influence varies from club-to-club and is related to the individual club committees. The manager is assisted by a team of two or three selectors and a backroom team consisting of various coaches.

Winning managers (1980–present)
Manager	Team	Wins	Winning years
Con Roche	St. Finbarr's	3	1982, 1984, 1988
Tim Murphy	Blackrock	3	1985, 2001, 2002
Paddy Fitzgerald	Midleton	3	1986, 1987, 1991
Fergal Condon	Imokilly	3	2017, 2018, 2019
John Crowley	Sarsfields	3	2010, 2023, 2025
Gerald McCarthy	St. Finbarr's	2	1980, 1981
Éamonn Ryan	Na Piarsaigh	2	1990, 1995
P. J. Murphy	Erin's Own	2	1992, 2007
Seánie O'Leary	Imokilly	2	1997, 1998
Bernie O'Connor	Newtownshandrum	2	2000, 2005
Pat Ryan	Sarsfields	2	2012, 2014
Richie Kelleher	Glen Rovers	2	2015, 2016
Denis Kelleher	Midleton	1	1983
Donie O'Donovan	Glen Rovers	1	1989
Charlie McCarty	St. Finbarr's	1	1993
Noel Crowley	Carbery	1	1994
Jack Russell	Avondhu	1	1996
Michael O'Brien	Blackrock	1	1999
Ger Cunningham	Newtownshandrum	1	2003
Paul O'Connor	Na Piarsaigh	1	2004
Martin Bowen	Erin's Own	1	2006
Bertie Óg Murphy	Sarsfields	1	2008
Phil Noonan	Newtownshandrum	1	2009
James O'Connor	Carrigtwohill	1	2011
Peter Smith	Midleton	1	2013
Fergal Ryan	Blackrock	1	2020
Ger FitzGerald	Midleton	1	2021
Ger Cunningham	St Finbarr's	1	2022

== Trophy and medals ==
The Seán Óg Murphy Cup is the current prize for winning the championship. It was commissioned to honour Seán Óg Murphy who served as a hurler, selector and County Board Secretary at various times over a 45-year period. Prior to this, several different cups and trophies had been presented to winning captains. The Seán Óg Murphy Cup is similar in design to the Liam MacCarthy Cup which was constructed to look like a medieval Irish drinking vessel called a mather. The cup bears the Irish inscription: Croabh Iomána Sinsear, Coiste Chontae Chorcaí de Cumann Lúthchleas Gael, a bhronn an corn seo, 1963, mar cuimhne ar Seán Óg Ó Murchú. Des Kiely of University College Cork was the first recipient of the cup when it was presented to him by the widow of the late Seán Óg Murphy after the 1963 final.

Traditionally, at Páirc Uí Chaoimh, the victory presentation takes place at a special rostrum in the main grandstand. At Páirc Uí Rinn the presentation was made on a podium on the pitch. The cup is decorated with ribbons in the colours of the winning team. During the game the cup actually has both teams' sets of ribbons attached and the runners-up ribbons are removed before the presentation. The winning captain accepts the cup on behalf of his team before giving a short speech. Individual members of the winning team then have an opportunity to come to the rostrum to lift the cup, which is held by the winning team until the following year's final.

In accordance with GAA rules, the County Board awards a set of gold medals to the championship winners. The medals depict a stylised version of the Cork GAA crest.

== Roll of honour ==
=== By club ===
#	Club	Titles	Runners-up	Championships won	Championships runner-up
1	Blackrock	33	20	1887, 1889, 1891, 1893, 1894, 1895, 1897, 1898, 1903, 1908, 1910, 1911, 1912, 1913, 1920, 1924, 1925, 1927, 1929, 1930, 1931, 1956, 1961, 1971, 1973, 1975, 1978, 1979, 1985, 1999, 2001, 2002, 2020	1892, 1914, 1918, 1919, 1922, 1923, 1926, 1939, 1948, 1954, 1959, 1963, 1974, 1976, 1982, 1986, 1998, 2003, 2017, 2022
2	Glen Rovers	28	18	1934, 1935, 1936, 1937, 1938, 1939, 1940, 1941, 1944, 1945, 1948, 1949, 1950, 1953, 1954, 1958, 1959, 1960, 1962, 1964, 1967, 1969, 1972, 1976, 1989, 2015, 2016, 2026	1930, 1946, 1951, 1955, 1956, 1973, 1975, 1977, 1978, 1980, 1981, 1988, 1991, 2010, 2014, 2019, 2020, 2021
3	St. Finbarr's	26	16	1899, 1904, 1905, 1906, 1919, 1922, 1923, 1926, 1932, 1933, 1942, 1943, 1946, 1947, 1955, 1965, 1968, 1974, 1977, 1980, 1981, 1982, 1984, 1988, 1993, 2022	1901, 1903, 1925, 1929, 1934, 1944, 1950, 1952, 1958, 1964, 1967, 1971, 1979, 1983, 1990, 2026
4	Sarsfields	8	11	1951, 1957, 2008, 2010, 2012, 2014, 2023, 2025	1909, 1936, 1940, 1947, 1953, 1989, 1997, 2009, 2013, 2015, 2024
4	Midleton	8	8	1914, 1916, 1983, 1986, 1987, 1991, 2013, 2021	1908, 1913, 1917, 1938, 1985, 1994, 2018, 2023, 2025
6	Imokilly	6	4	1997, 1998, 2017, 2018, 2019, 2024	1949, 1968, 1996, 2001
7	Redmonds	5	5	1892, 1900, 1901, 1915, 1917	1893, 1899, 1912, 1924, 1927
8	Newtownshandrum	4	2	2000, 2003, 2005, 2009	2002, 2007
9	Dungourney	3	2	1902, 1907, 1909	1900, 1910
9	Na Piarsaigh	3	2	1990, 1995, 2004	1987, 1992
9	Erin's Own	3	2	1992, 2006, 2007	2000, 2016
9	Avondhu	3	1	1952, 1966, 1996	1961
13	University College Cork	2	7	1963, 1970	1957, 1960, 1962, 1965, 1966, 1969, 1999
13	Carrigtwohill	2	5	1918, 2011	1898, 1932, 1933, 1935, 1937
15	Ballyhea	1	3	1896	1895, 1984, 1995
15	Aghabullogue	1	1	1890	1911
15	Éire Óg	1	1	1928	1931
15	Carbery	1	1	1994	1993
15	Tower Street	1	0	1888	—N/a
20	Aghada	0	3	—N/a	1889, 1890, 1897
20	Ballincollig	0	3	—N/a	1941, 1942, 1943
20	Cloyne	0	3	—N/a	2004, 2005, 2006
20	Ballygarvan	0	2	—N/a	1888, 1896
20	Castletownroche	0	2	—N/a	1904, 1907
20	Passage West	0	1	—N/a	1887
20	Inniscarra	0	1	—N/a	1891
20	Blarney	0	1	—N/a	1894
20	Shanballymore	0	1	—N/a	1902
20	Ballymartle	0	1	—N/a	1906
20	Collegians	0	1	—N/a	1915
20	Shamrocks	0	1	—N/a	1916
20	Fairhill	0	1	—N/a	1920
20	Mallow	0	1	—N/a	1928
20	Carrigdhoun	0	1	—N/a	1945
20	Muskerry	0	1	—N/a	1970
20	Youghal	0	1	—N/a	1972
20	Bride Rovers	0	1	—N/a	2008
20	MTU Cork	0	1	—N/a	2011
20	Bishopstown	0	1	—N/a	2012

=== By Division ===
Division	Titles	Runners-Up	Total	Most recent win
Seandún	98	73	169	2026
Imokilly	29	40	67	2025
Avondhu	8	10	18	2009
Muskerry	2	8	10	1928
Carbery	1	1	2	1994
Carrigdhoun	0	5	5	—
Duhallow	0	0	0	—

=== Notes ===
- Seandun — Includes 2 wins and 9 runners-up for colleges (MTU, UCC)

== List of finals ==
=== Legend ===
- Gold – Munster senior club champions
- Silver – Munster senior club runners-up

=== List of Cork PSHC finals ===
Year	Winners		Runners-up		Winning captain	#
Year	Club	Score	Club	Score	Winning captain	#
1887	Cork Nationals		Passage West			
1888	Tower Street	4-01	Ballygarvan	0-01	William Gleeson	
1899	Blackrock	Wo	Aghada	Scr	Stephen Hayes	
1890	Aghabullogue	7-03	Aghada	1-01	Dan Lane	
1891	Blackrock	4-04	Inniscarra	0-00	Stephen Hayes	
1892	Redmonds	2-04	Blackrock	0-05	Bill O'Callaghan	
1893	Blackrock	2-05	Redmonds	1-01	John Murphy	
1894	Blackrock	1-05	Blarney	0-02	Stephen Hayes	
1895	Blackrock	1-02	Ballyhea	1-01	Pat Coughlan	
1896	Ballyhea	6-10	Ballygarvan	1-02	Jer Murphy	
1897	Blackrock	5-08	Aghada	0-00	Pat Coughlan	
1898	Blackrock	2-09	Carrigtwohill	0-02	Pat Coughlan	
1899	St. Finbarr's	0-08	Redmond’s	0-07	Jim Young	
1900	Redmonds	1-09	Dungourney	2-03		
1901	Redmonds	1-11	St. Finbarr's	2-04	Paddy Cantillon	
1902	Dungourney	3-10	Shanballymore	2-05	Jamesy Kelleher	
1903	Blackrock	2-08	St. Finbarr's	1-10	Steva Riordan	
1904	St. Finbarr's	Wo	Castletownroche	Scr	Dan Harrington	
1905	No Championship					
1906	St. Finbarr's	2-09	Ballymartle	0-06	Dan Harrington	
1907	Dungourney	5-17	Castletownroche	0-03	Jamesy Kelleher	
1908	Blackrock	4-11	Midleton	2-03		
1909	Dungourney	6-10	Sarsfields	1-08		
1910	Blackrock	6-03	Dungourney	3-01		
1911	Blackrock	3-02	Aghabullogue	0-00		
1912	Blackrock	4-02	Redmonds	0-01	Andy Buckley	
1913	Blackrock	3-03	Midleton	2-03	Barry Murphy	
1914	Midleton	Wo	Blackrock	Scr		
1915	Redmonds	4-01	Collegians	0-01	Connie Sheehan	
1916	Midleton	4-00	Shamrocks	3-02	James O'Connell	
1917	Redmonds	5-01	Midleton	1-03	Connie Sheehan	
1918	Carrigtwohill	4-01	Blackrock	1-07	Billy Kennedy	
1919	St. Finbarr's	5-03	Blackrock	4-01	T. Finn	
1920	Blackrock	14-04	Fairhill	2-00	Mattie Murphy	
1921	No Championship					
1922	St. Finbarr's	Wo	Blackrock	Scr		
1923	St. Finbarr's	0-06	Blackrock	1-02	Maurice O'Brien	
1924	Blackrock	3-05	Redmond’s	1-02	Seán Óg Murphy	
1925	Blackrock	6-04	St. Finbarr's	2-03	Seán Óg Murphy	
1926	St. Finbarr's	6-02	Blackrock	5-04	D. Coughlan	
1927	Blackrock	5-05	Redmonds	2-01	Seán Óg Murphy	
1928	Éire Óg	5-02	Mallow	3-02	Dinny Barry-Murphy	
1929	Blackrock	5-06	St. Finbarr's	2-02		
1930	Blackrock	3-08	Glen Rovers	1-03	Eudie Coughlan	
1931	Blackrock	2-04	Éire Óg	0-03	Eudie Coughlan	
1932	St. Finbarr's	5-03	Carrigtwohill	4-04	Johnny Kenneally	
1933	St. Finbarr's	6-06	Carrigtwohill	5-00	Johnny Kenneally	
1934	Glen Rovers	3-02	St. Finbarr's	0-06	Josa Lee	
1935	Glen Rovers	Wo.	Carrigtwohill	Scr.	Josa Lee	
1936	Glen Rovers	7-05	Sarsfields	4-02	Josa Lee	
1937	Glen Rovers	3-05	Carrigtwohill	1-00	Josa Lee	
1938	Glen Rovers	5-06	Midleton	1-03	Josa Lee	
1939	Glen Rovers	5-04	Blackrock	2-05	Jack Lynch	
1940	Glen Rovers	10-06	Sarsfields	7-05	Jack Lynch	
1941	Glen Rovers	4-07	Ballincollig	2-02	Connie Buckley	
1942	St. Finbarr's	5-07	Ballincollig	2-02		
1943	St. Finbarr's	7-09	Ballincollig	1-01	J. Horgan	
1944	Glen Rovers	5-07	St. Finbarr's	3-03	Din Joe Buckley	
1945	Glen Rovers	4-10	Carrigdhoun	5-03	Paddy O'Donovan	
1946	St. Finbarr's	2-03	Glen Rovers	2-01		
1947	St. Finbarr's	4-06	Sarsfields	4-04		
1948	Glen Rovers	5-07	Blackrock	3-02	Jim Young	
1949	Glen Rovers	6-05	Imokilly	0-14	Dave Creedon	
1950	Glen Rovers	2-08	St. Finbarr's	0-05	John Lyons	
1951	Sarsfields	5-08	Glen Rovers	3-07	Pat O'Leary	
1952	Avondhu	3-08	St. Finbarr's	4-03		
1953	Glen Rovers	8-05	Sarsfields	4-03	Josie Hartnett	
1954	Glen Rovers	7-07	Blackrock	3-02	Christy Ring	
1955	St. Finbarr's	2-08	Glen Rovers	2-06	Tony O'Shaughnessy	
1956	Blackrock	2-10	Glen Rovers	2-02	Mick Cashman	
1957	Sarsfields	5-10	University College Cork	4-06	Mossie O'Connor	
1958	Glen Rovers	4-06	St. Finbarr's	3-05	John Lyons	
1959	Glen Rovers	3-11	Blackrock	3-05	John Lyons	
1960	Glen Rovers	3-08	University College Cork	1-12	Joe Twomey	
1961	Blackrock	4-10	Avondhu	3-07	Mick Cashman	
1962	Glen Rovers	3-08	University College Cork	2-10	Finbarr O'Regan	
1963	University College Cork	4-17	Blackrock	5-06	Des Kiely	
1964	Glen Rovers	3-12	St. Finbarr's	2-07	Christy Ring	
1965	St. Finbarr's	6-08	University College Cork	2-06	Tim O’Mullane	
1966	Avondhu	2-11	University College Cork	4-04	Paddy Behan	
1967	Glen Rovers	3-09	St. Finbarr's	1-09	Seán Kennefick	
1968	St. Finbarr's	5-09	Imokilly	1-19	Jim Power	
1969	Glen Rovers	4-16	University College Cork	1-13	Denis O'Riordan	
1970	University College Cork	2-12	Muskerry	0-16	Mick McCarthy	
1971	Blackrock	2-19	St. Finbarr's	5-04	John Horgan	
1972	Glen Rovers	3-15	Youghal	1-10	Denis Coughlan	
1973	Blackrock	2-12	Glen Rovers	2-10	John Horgan	
1974	St. Finbarr's	2-17	Blackrock	2-14	Jim Power	
1975	Blackrock	4-11	Glen Rovers	0-10	Éamonn O'Donoghue	
1976	Glen Rovers	2-07	Blackrock	0-10	Martin O'Doherty	
1977	St. Finbarr's	1-17	Glen Rovers	1-05	Denis Burns	
1978	Blackrock	4-12	Glen Rovers	1-07	John Horgan	
1979	Blackrock	2-14	St. Finbarr's	2-06	Tim Murphy	
1980	St. Finbarr's	1-09	Glen Rovers	2-04	Bertie O'Brien	
1981	St. Finbarr's	1-12	Glen Rovers	1-09	Dónal O'Grady	
1982	St. Finbarr's	2-17	Blackrock	3-09	John Blake	
1983	Midleton	1-18	St. Finbarr's	2-09	John Fenton	
1984	St. Finbarr's	1-15	Ballyhea	2-04	John Hodgins	
1985	Blackrock	1-14	Midleton	1-08	Andy Creagh	
1986	Midleton	1-18	Blackrock	1-10	Kevin Hennessy	
1987	Midleton	2-12	Na Piarsaigh	0-15	Ger Power	
1988	St. Finbarr's	3-18	Glen Rovers	2-14	Ger Cunningham	
1989	Glen Rovers	4-15	Sarsfield's	3-13	Tomás Mulcahy	
1990	Na Piarsaigh	2-07	St. Finbarr's	1-08	Christy Coughlan	
1991	Midleton	1-17	Glen Rovers	1-08	Ger FitzGerald	
1992	Erin's Own	1-12	Na Piarsaigh	0-12	Frank Horgan	
1993	St. Finbarr's	1-14	Carbery	1-13	Mick Barry	
1994	Carbery	3-12	Midleton	3-06	Barry Harte	
1995	Na Piarsaigh	1-12	Ballyhea	3-01	Leonard Forde	
1996	Avondhu	0-13	Imokilly	1-08	Aidan Kenny	
1997	Imokilly	1-18	Sarsfields	2-12	Brian O'Driscoll	
1998	Imokilly	1-10	Blackrock	1-05	William O'Riordan	
1999	Blackrock	3-17	University College Cork	0-08	Noel Keane	
2000	Newtownshandrum	0-14	Erin's Own	0-11	Donal Mulcahy	
2001	Blackrock	4-08	Imokilly	2-07	Wayne Sherlock	
2002	Blackrock	1-14	Newtownshandrum	0-12	Wayne Sherlock	
2003	Newtownshandrum	0-17	Blackrock	0-09	John McCarthy	
2004	Na Piarsaigh	0-17	Cloyne	0-10	Mark Prendergast	
2005	Newtownshandrum	0-15	Cloyne	0-09	Brendan Mulcahy	
2006	Erin's Own	2-19	Cloyne	3-14	Kieran 'Hero' Murphy	
2007	Erin's Own	1-11	Newtownshandrum	0-07	Kieran 'Hero' Murphy	
2008	Sarsfields	2-14	Bride Rovers	2-13	Kieran 'Fraggy' Murphy	
2009	Newtownshandrum	3-22	Sarsfields	1-12	Dermot Gleeson	
2010	Sarsfields	1-17	Glen Rovers	0-18	Alan Kennedy	
2011	Carrigtwohill	0-15	Cork Institute of Technology	1-11	Brian Lordan	
2012	Sarsfields	1-15	Bishopstown	1-13	Joe Barry	
2013	Midleton	2-15	Sarsfields	2-13	Pádraig O'Shea	
2014	Sarsfields	2-18	Glen Rovers	0-08	Tadhg Óg Murphy	
2015	Glen Rovers	2-17	Sarsfields	1-13	Graham Callinan	
2016	Glen Rovers	0-19	Erin's Own	2-11	Graham Callinan	
2017	Imokilly	3-13	Blackrock	0-18	Séamus Harnedy	
2018	Imokilly	4-19	Midleton	1-18	Séamus Harnedy	
2019	Imokilly	2-17	Glen Rovers	1-16	Séamus Harnedy	
2020	Blackrock	4-26	Glen Rovers	4-18	Michael O'Halloran; Cathal Cormack	
2021	Midleton	0-24	Glen Rovers	1-18	Conor Lehane	
2022	St. Finbarr's	2-14	Blackrock	1-07	Billy Hennessy	
2023	Sarsfields	0-21	Midleton	0-19	Conor O'Sullivan	
2024	Imokilly	1-23	Sarsfields	0-17	Ciaran O'Brien	
2025	Sarsfields	2-18	Midleton	1-14	Conor O'Sullivan	
2026	Glen Rovers	2-20	St. Finbarr's	0-23	Adam Lynch	

=== Notes ===
- 1933 - The first match ended in a draw: St. Finbarr's 4-6, Carrigtwohill 5-3.
- 1943 - The first match ended in a draw: St. Finbarr's 3-3, Ballincollig 3-3.
- 1952 - The first match ended in a draw: Avondhu 3-9, St. Finbarr's 4-6.
- 1955 - The first match ended in a draw: St. Finbarr's 2-6, Glen Rovers 1-9.
- 1962 - The first match ended in a draw: Glen Rovers 3-7, University College Cork 2-10
- 1990 - The first match ended in a draw: Na Piarsaigh 1-12, St. Finbarr's 3-6.
- 1996 - The first match ended in a draw: Avondhu 1-12, Imokilly 1-12.
- 2020 - The match ended in a draw before extra time was played.

== Records and statistics ==
=== Final ===
==== Team ====
- Most wins: 33:
  - Blackrock (1887, 1889, 1891, 1893, 1894, 1895, 1897, 1898, 1903, 1908, 1910, 1911, 1912, 1913, 1920, 1924, 1925, 1927, 1929, 1930, 1931, 1956, 1961, 1971, 1973, 1975, 1978, 1979, 1985, 1999, 2001, 2002, 2020)
- Most consecutive wins: 8:
  - Glen Rovers (1934, 1935, 1936, 1937, 1938, 1939, 1940, 1941)
- Most appearances in a final: 53:
  - Blackrock (1887, 1889, 1891, 1892, 1893, 1894, 1895, 1897, 1898, 1903, 1908, 1910, 1911, 1912, 1913, 1914, 1918, 1919, 1920, 1922, 1923, 1924, 1925, 1926, 1927, 1929, 1930, 1931, 1939, 1948, 1954, 1956, 1959, 1961, 1963, 1971, 1973, 1974, 1975, 1976, 1978, 1979, 1982, 1985, 1986, 1998, 1999, 2001, 2002, 2003, 2017, 2020, 2022)
- Most appearances in a final without ever winning: 3, joint record
  - Aghada (1889, 1890, 1897)
  - Ballincollig (1941, 1942, 1943)
  - Cloyne (2004, 2005, 2006)
- Most appearances in a final without losing (streak): 11
  - Blackrock (1893, 1894, 1895, 1897, 1898, 1903, 1908, 1910, 1911, 1912, 1913)
- Biggest win: 40 points
  - Blackrock 14-04 - 2-00 Fairhill, (1920)
- Most goals in a final: 17
  - Glen Rovers 10-06 - 7-05 Sarsfields, (1940)
- Most goals by a losing side: 7
  - Sarsfields 7-05 - 10-06 Glen Rovers, (1940)
- Most defeats: 20
  - Blackrock (1892, 1914, 1918, 1919, 1922, 1923, 1926, 1939, 1948, 1954, 1959, 1963, 1974, 1976, 1982, 1986, 1998, 2003, 2017, 2022)

==== Individual ====
- Most wins by a player: 14, Christy Ring (Glen Rovers) (1941, 1944, 1945, 1948, 1949, 1950, 1953, 1954, 1958, 1959, 1960, 1962, 1964, 1967)

=== Teams ===
==== By decade ====
The most successful team of each decade, judged by number of Cork Senior Hurling Championship titles, is as follows:

- 1880s: 2 for Blackrock (1887–89)
- 1890s: 6 for Blackrock (1891-93-94-95-97-98)
- 1900s: 3 for St. Finbarr's (1904-05-06)
- 1910s: 4 for Blackrock (1910-11-12-13)
- 1920s: 5 for St. Finbarr's (1920-24-25-27-29)
- 1930s: 6 for Glen Rovers (1934-35-36-37-38-39)
- 1940s: 6 for Glen Rovers (1940-41-44-45-48-49)
- 1950s: 5 for Glen Rovers (1950-53-54-57-58)
- 1960s: 5 for Glen Rovers (1960-62-64-67-69)
- 1970s: 5 for Blackrock (1971-73-75-78-79)
- 1980s: 5 for St. Finbarr's (1980-81-82-84-88)
- 1990s: 2 each for Na Piarsaigh (1990–95) and Imokilly (1997–98)
- 2000s: 4 for Newtownshandrum (2000-03-05-09)
- 2010s: 3 each for Sarsfields (2010-12-14) and Imokilly (2017-18-19)

==== Successful defending ====
Only 7 teams of the 19 who have won the championship have ever successfully defended the title. These are:

- Glen Rovers on 14 attempts out of 26 (1935, 1936, 1937, 1938, 1939, 1940, 1941, 1945, 1949, 1950, 1954, 1959, 1960, 2016)
- Blackrock on 11 attempts out of 31 (1894, 1895, 1898, 1911, 1912, 1913, 1925, 1930, 1931, 1979, 2002)
- St. Finbarr's on 8 attempts out of 24 (1905, 1906, 1923, 1933, 1943, 1947, 1981, 1982)
- Imokilly on 3 attempts out of 4 (1997, 2018, 2019)
- Redmonds on 1 attempt out of 4 (1901)
- Midleton on 1 attempt out of 6 (1987)
- Erin's Own on 1 attempt out of 2 (2007)

==== Longest undefeated run ====
The record for the longest unbeaten run stands at 30 games held by Glen Rovers. It began with a 5-06 to 3-00 win against Mallow in their opening game of the 1934 championship on 22 April 1934 and finished with a 3-08 to 3-01 win against Sarsfields in the first round of the 1942 championship on 17 May 1942. The 30-game unbeaten streak, which included no drawn game but one walkover, ended with a 5-04 to 1-08 loss to Ballincollig in the 1942 championship semi-final.

=== Top scorers ===
==== All time ====
As of 21 September 2025.

Rank	Name	Team(s)	Goals	Points	Total
1	Patrick Horgan	Glen Rovers	36	742	850
2	Eoghan Murphy	Erin's Own	20	533	593
3	Conor Lehane	Midleton	20	473	533
4	Christy Ring	Glen Rovers	80	205	445
5	Ben O'Connor	Newtownshandrum	21	360	423
6	Joe Deane	Killeagh	21	351	414
7	Barry Johnson	Bride Rovers	15	322	367
8	Jamie Coughlan	Newtownshandrum	26	284	362
9	Cian McCarthy	Sarsfields; Douglas; Seandún	18	302	356

==== By year (1970–present) ====
Year	Top scorer	Team	Score	Total
1970	Tomás Ryan	Muskerry	0-38	38
1971	Pat Moylan	Blackrock	0-37	37
1972	Patsy Harte	Glen Rovers	3-14	23
1973	Tom Buckley	Glen Rovers	2-22	28
1974	Willie Glavin	Imokilly	4-14	26
1975	Paddy O'Sullivan	Seandún	5-04	19
1975	Pat Horgan	Glen Rovers	0-19	19
1976	Tom Collins	Glen Rovers	5-08	23
1977	Noel Crowley	Bandon	2-16	22
1978	Pádraig Crowley	Bandon	1-25	28
1979	John Fenton	Midleton	5-45	60
1980	John Fenton	Midleton		
1981	Christy Ryan	St. Finbarr's	6-05	23
1982	John Fenton	Midleton	2-24	30
1983	Tony Coyne	Youghal	2-27	33
1984	Denis Walsh	Ballyhea	0-31	31
1985	Finbarr Delaney	Blackrock	3-22	31
1986	Ger FitzGerald	Midleton	5-17	32
1987	Mickey Mullins	Na Piarsaigh	0-33	33
1988	Brian Cunningham	St. Finbarr's	2-29	35
1989	Tadhg Murphy	Sarsfields	3-27	36
1990	Brian Cunningham	St. Finbarr's	2-28	34
1991	Ger Riordan	Glen Rovers	1-22	25
1992	Brian Corcoran	Erin's Own	0-44	44
1993	Brian Cunningham	St. Finbarr's	0-24	24
1994	Brian Cunningham	St. Finbarr's	4-13	25
1995	Niall Ahern	Sarsfields	4-17	29
1996	Jimmy Smiddy	Imokilly	3-38	47
1997	Pat Ryan	Sarsfields	1-47	50
1998	Brian Cunningham	St. Finbarr's	3-23	32
1999	Joe Deane	University College Cork	3-26	35
2000	Joe Deane	Imokilly	6-32	50
2001	Ben O'Connor	Newtownshandrum	6-29	47
2002	Neil Ronan	Ballyhea	2-36	42
2003	Ben O'Connor	Newtownshandrum	2-30	36
2004	John Anderson	Glen Rovers	0-47	47
2005	Paudie O'Sullivan	Cloyne	3-19	28
2006	Paudie O'Sullivan	Cloyne	4-25	37
2007	Kevin Murray	St. Finbarr's	1-32	35
2008	Patrick Horgan	Glen Rovers	1-43	46
2009	Niall McCarthy	Carrigtwohill	4-27	39
2010	Patrick Horgan	Glen Rovers	6-62	80
2011	Barry Johnson	Bride Rovers	0-39	39
2012	Pa Cronin	Bishopstown	1-44	47
2013	Conor Lehane	Midleton	5-48	63
2014	Cian McCarthy	Sarsfields	2-54	60
2015	Cian McCarthy	Sarsfields	2-52	58
2016	Patrick Horgan	Glen Rovers	3-63	72
2016	Eoghan Murphy	Erin's Own	3-63	72
2017	Ronan Crowley	Bandon	2-54	60
2018	Conor Lehane	Midleton	2-37	43
2019	Declan Dalton	Imokilly	3-55	64
2020	Alan Connolly	Blackrock	5-52	67
2021	Patrick Horgan	Glen Rovers	6-56	74
2022	Stephen Condon	Avondhu	3-47	56
2022	Ben Cunningham	St Finbarr's	2-50	56
2023	Ben Cunningham	St Finbarr's	1-58	61
2024	Conor Lehane	Midleton	1-55	58
2025	Patrick Horgan	Glen Rovers	5-39	54

==== In a single game (2011–present) ====
Year	Top scorer	Team	Score	Total
2010	Robert O'Driscoll	Sarsfields	2-10	16
2011	Patrick Horgan	Glen Rovers	1-12	15
2012	Pa Cronin	Bishopstown	1-10	13
2013	Conor Lehane	Midleton	2-10	16
2014	Barry Johnson	Bride Rovers	2-10	16
2015	Pa O'Callaghan	Ballyhea	0-15	15
2016	Eoghan Murphy	Erin's Own	2-12	18
2017	Ronan Crowley	Bandon	1-10	13
2017	Pa O'Callaghan	Ballyhea	0-13	13
2018	Eoghan Murphy	Erin's Own	1-11	14
2019	Barry Johnson	Bride Rovers	3-09	18
2020	Conor Lehane	Midleton	3-11	20
2021	Patrick Horgan	Glen Rovers	2-13	19
2022	Patrick Horgan	Glen Rovers	1-14	17
2023	Ben Cunningham	St Finbarr's	0-18	18
2024	Declan Dalton	Fr O'Neill's	1-12	15
2025	Patrick Horgan	Glen Rovers	2-10	16
2025	Richard O'Sullivan	Newcestown	2-10	16
2025	Alan Connolly	Blackrock	1-13	16

==== In finals (1934–present) ====
Final	Top scorer	Team	Score	Total
1933	Johnny Kenneally (D)	St. Finbarr's	2-01	7
1933	Johnny Kenneally (R)	St. Finbarr's	3-00	9
1934	Patcheen Murphy	Glen Rovers	2-00	6
1935				
1936	William O'Driscoll	Glen Rovers	3-00	9
1937	Dan Moylan	Glen Rovers	1-01	4
1938	Charlie Tobin	Glen Rovers	3-01	10
1939	Dan Moylan	Glen Rovers	2-01	7
1940	Charlie Tobin	Glen Rovers	6-00	18
1941	Charlie Tobin	Glen Rovers	1-02	5
1942	Derry Beckett	St. Finbarr's	1-03	6
1943				
1944	Christy Ring	Glen Rovers	0-05	5
1945	Christy Ring	Glen Rovers	0-06	6
1946	Seán Condon	St. Finbarr's	1-01	4
1946	Jack Lynch	Glen Rovers	1-01	4
1947	Jim Sargent	St. Finbarr's	2-00	6
1947	Micka Brennan	Sarsfields	2-00	6
1948	Jimmy Lynam	Glen Rovers	2-00	6
1948	Charlie O'Flaherty	Glen Rovers	2-00	6
1949	Donie Twomey	Glen Rovers	3-00	9
1950	Jack Lynch	Glen Rovers	1-00	3
1950	Donie O'Sullivan	Glen Rovers	1-00	3
1951	Micka Brennan	Sarsfields	3-01	10
1952	Harry Goldsboro (D)	St. Finbarr's	2-02	8
1952	Mick Kickham (R)	St. Finbarr's	3-00	9
1953	Josie Hartnett	Glen Rovers	2-00	6
1954	Jim Rodgers	Glen Rovers	1-01	4
1954	Seán Horgan	Blackrock	1-01	4
1955	Christy Ring (D)	Glen Rovers	1-04	7
1955	T. Maher (R)	St. Finbarr's	3-00	9
1955	Christy Ring (R)	Glen Rovers	2-03	9
1956	Michael Murphy	Blackrock	1-03	6
1957	Paddy Barry	Sarsfields	2-02	8
1958	Frank Daly	Glen Rovers	2-00	6
1959	Christy Ring	Glen Rovers	1-06	9
1960	John Joe Browne	University College Cork	1-05	8
1961	Willie Galligan	Blackrock	1-05	8
1962	Christy Ring (D)	Glen Rovers	1-03	6
1962	Mick Mortell (R)	University College Cork	1-03	6
1963	Mick Mortell	University College Cork	1-05	8
1964	Christy Ring	Glen Rovers	1-04	7
1965	Charlie McCarthy	St. Finbarr's	2-05	11
1966	Seánie Barry	University College Cork	1-02	5
1967	Mick Kenneally	Glen Rovers	2-03	9
1968	Seánie Barry	Imokilly	0-13	13
1969	Patsy Harte	Glen Rovers	1-06	9
1970	Ray Cummins	University College Cork	2-03	9
1971	Pat Moylan	Blackrock	0-10	10
1972	Tom Buckley	Glen Rovers	1-05	8
1973	Donie Collins	Blackrock	1-05	8
1974	Charlie McCarthy	St. Finbarr's	2-03	9
1975	Pat Horgan	Glen Rovers	0-09	9
1976	Patsy Harte	Glen Rovers	2-02	8
1977	Christy Ryan	St. Finbarr's	1-01	4
1978	Ray Cummins	Blackrock	1-04	7
1979	Pat Moylan	Blackrock	0-05	5
1980	Éamonn Fitzpatrick	St. Finbarr's	1-01	4
1981	Paddy Ring	Glen Rovers	1-03	6
1982	Ray Cummins	Blackrock	3-00	9
1983	John Fenton	Midleton	0-10	10
1984	Willie Shanahan	Ballyhea	2-03	9
1985	Finbarr Delaney	Blackrock	1-03	6
1986	Finbarr Delaney	Blackrock	1-04	7
1987	John Fenton	Midleton	1-09	12
1988	Brian Cunningham	St. Finbarr's	0-12	12
1989	Tadhg Murphy	Sarsfields	0-09	9
1990	Brian Cunningham (D)	St. Finbarr's	1-04	7
1990	James O'Connor (R)	Na Piarsaigh	2-00	6
1990	Brian Cunningham (R)	St. Finbarr's	0-06	6
1991	John Fenton	Midleton	0-07	7
1991	Ger Riordan	Glen Rovers	1-04	7
1992	Brian Corcoran	Erin's Own	0-10	10
1993	Pádraig Crowley (D)	Carbery	0-07	7
1993	Pádraig Crowley (R)	Carbery	1-04	7
1993	Billy O'Shea (R)	St. Finbarr's	0-07	7
1994	Jeff O'Connell	Carbery	2-01	7
1994	Ger Manley	Midleton	1-04	7
1995	Mark O'Sullivan	Na Piarsaigh	1-01	4
1996	Jimmy Smiddy (D)	Imokilly	1-06	9
1996	Jimmy Smiddy (R)	Imokilly	0-06	6
1997	Pat Ryan	Sarsfields	1-07	10
1998	Alan Browne	Blackrock	1-01	4
1998	Seán O'Farrell	Imokilly	1-01	4
1999	Alan Browne	Blackrock	2-02	8
2000	John Corcoran	Erin's Own	0-07	7
2001	Alan Browne	Blackrock	3-08	17
2002	Alan Browne	Blackrock	1-04	7
2002	Ben O'Connor	Newtownshandrum	0-07	7
2003	Ben O'Connor	Newtownshandrum	0-10	10
2004	Aisake Ó hAilpín	Na Piarsaigh	0-05	5
2005	Ben O'Connor	Newtownshandrum	0-06	6
2006	Eoghan Murphy	Erin's Own	1-10	13
2007	Ben O'Connor	Newtownshandrum	1-03	6
2008	Seán Ryan	Bride Rovers	1-03	6
2008	Pat Ryan	Sarsfields	0-06	6
2009	Ben O'Connor	Newtownshandrum	1-04	7
2010	Patrick Horgan	Glen Rovers	0-10	10
2011	Michael Fitzgerald	Carrigtwohill	0-06	6
2012	Cian McCarthy	Sarsfields	0-08	8
2013	Conor Lehane	Midleton	2-10	16
2014	Cian McCarthy	Sarsfields	0-10	10
2015	Cian McCarthy	Sarsfields	1-06	9
2015	Patrick Horgan	Glen Rovers	0-09	9
2016	Patrick Horgan	Glen Rovers	0-12	12
2017	Michael O'Halloran	Blackrock	0-08	8
2018	Séamus Harnedy	Imokilly	1-06	9
2019	Patrick Horgan	Glen Rovers	0-11	11
2020	Patrick Horgan	Glen Rovers	1-11	14
2021	Patrick Horgan	Glen Rovers	1-12	15
2022	Ben Cunningham	St Finbarr's	0-09	9
2023	Aaron Myers	Sarsfields	0-12	12
2024	Jack Leahy	Imokilly	0-11	11
2024	Colm McCarthy	Sarsfields	0-08	8

==== Cumulative finals ====
As of match played 4 October 2020.

Rank	Name	Team	Goals	Points	Total
1	Christy Ring	Glen Rovers	12	44	80
2	Patrick Horgan	Glen Rovers	2	70	76
3	Charlie McCarthy	St. Finbarr's	9	25	52
4	Cian McCarthy	Sarsfields	2	40	46
5	Charlie Tobin	Glen Rovers	12	7	43
6	Ben O'Connor	Newtownshandrum	2	36	42
7	Ray Cummins	Blackrock	9	13	40
8	Patsy Harte	Glen Rovers	5	24	39
9	Alan Browne	Blackrock	7	15	36
9	Conor Lehane	Midleton	2	30	36

=== Man of the match ===
List of county final man of the match award winners:

Final	MOTM	Team
1979	Dermot McCurtain	Blackrock
1980	John Cremin	St. Finbarr's
1981	John Blake	St. Finbarr's
1982	Ger Cunningham	St. Finbarr's
1983	John Fenton	Midleton
1984	Phil Ryan	Ballyhea
1985	Jim Cashman	Blackrock
1986	Tadhg McCarthy	Midleton
1987	John Fenton	Midleton
1988	Brian Cunningham	St. Finbarr's
1989	John Fitzgibbon	Glen Rovers
1990	Richie McDonnell	Na Piarsaigh
1991	Kieran McGuckin	Glen Rovers
1992	Timmy Kelleher	Erin's Own
1993	Ger Cunningham	St. Finbarr's
1994	Pat Kenneally	Carbery
1995	Paul O'Connor	Na Piarsaigh
1996	Fergal McCormack	Avondhu
1996	Conor Hannon	Avondhu
1997	Timmy McCarthy	Imokilly
1998	Mark Landers	Imokilly
1999	Jim Cashman	Blackrock
2000	Pat Mulcahy	Newtownshandrum
2001	Alan Browne	Blackrock
2002	Alan Cummins	Blackrock
2003	Ben O'Connor	Newtownshandrum
2004	John Gardiner	Na Piarsaigh
2005	Pat Mulcahy	Newtownshandrum
2006	Eoghan Murphy	Erin's Own
2007	Shane Murphy	Erin's Own
2008	Michael Cussen	Sarsfields
2009	Pat Mulcahy	Newtownshandrum
2010	Cian McCarthy	Sarsfields
2011	Niall McCarthy	Carrigtwohill
2012	Eoin Quigley	Sarsfields
2013	Conor Lehane	Midleton
2014	Daniel Roche	Sarsfields
2015	Graham Callanan	Glen Rovers
2016	Patrick Horgan	Glen Rovers
2017	Ger Millerick	Imokilly
2018	Séamus Harnedy	Imokilly
2019	No award	
2020	Alan Connolly	Blackrock
2021	Conor Lehane	Midleton

== Winners and finalists ==
=== The Double ===
Three teams have won the Cork Senior Hurling Championship and the Cork Senior Football Championship in a single year as part of a hurling-Gaelic football double. Glen Rovers and their sister club, St. Nicholas', became the first teams to win the double in 1938 before claiming two further doubles in 1941 and 1954. University College Cork won their only double in 1963. St. Finbarr's hold the distinction of being the only single entity club team to have won the double. They achieved this in 1980 and 1982.

Divisional sides Avondhu, Carbery and Imokilly and club team Midleton also hold the distinction of being dual county senior championship-winning teams, however, these were not achieved in a single calendar season.

== Media coverage ==
=== Radio ===
C103 & CRY 104.0FM provides extensive radio coverage of the championship, including several full live commentaries from Round 1 to the final. Both will cover the final live.

The Big Red Bench on Cork's Red FM cover most games with reports and updates on radio and their Twitter feed.

=== Television ===
TG4 has carried live and deferred television broadcasts of several finals over the years as part of its GAA Beo programme. On 29 April 2018, TG4 broadcast live coverage of a Round 1 double-header for the first time. The awarding of TV rights to RTÉ saw the broadcaster carry live coverage of games in 2019.

== See also ==
- List of Cork Senior Hurling Championship winners
- Cork Senior A Hurling Championship
- Munster Senior Club Hurling Championship
- Cork Premier Senior Football Championship
