= Harry Goldsboro =

Irish hurler

Harry Goldsborough
Personal information
- Born: 14 September 1920 Thurles, County Tipperary, Ireland
- Died: 3 February 1994 (aged 73) Cork, Ireland
- Occupation: Soldier

Sport
- Sport: Hurling
- Position: Midfield
Clubs
- Years: Club
- Thurles Sarsfields; Army; St Finbarr's
Inter-county
- Years: County
- 1945–1948: Tipperary
Inter-county titles
- Munster titles: 1
- All-Irelands: 1
- NHL: 0

Harry Goldsborough (14 September 1920 – 3 February 1994) was an Irish hurler who played as a midfielder at senior level for the Tipperary county team.

Goldsborough made his first appearance for the team during the 1945 championship and was a regular member of the starting fifteen until his retirement after the 1948 championship. During that time he won one All-Ireland medal and one Munster medal, At club level Goldsborough played with Thurles Sarsfields, Army and St Finbarr's.
