= 1917 Cork Senior Hurling Championship =

Annual hurling competition season

- Champions: Redmonds (5th title); Connie Sheehan (captain)
- Runners-up: Midleton

The 1917 Cork Senior Hurling Championship was the 30th staging of the Cork Senior Hurling Championship since its establishment by the Cork County Board in 1887.

Midleton were the defending champions.

On 30 September 1917, Redmonds won the championship following a 5–1 to 0–3 defeat of Midleton in the final. This was their fifth championship title overall and their first title in two championship seasons.

== Results ==
=== Final ===
30 September 1917 Final	Redmonds	5-01 – 0-03	Midleton	Cork Athletic Grounds, Cork

=== Miscellaneous ===
- Redmonds win the last of their five county titles.
