= 1911 Cork Senior Hurling Championship =

Annual hurling competition season

- Dates: 2 April 1911 – 10 December 1911
- Teams: 7
- Champions: Blackrock (12th title); Tom Coughlan (captain)
- Runners-up: Aghabullogue; Mick Lynch (captain)

Tournament statistics
- Matches played: 8
- Goals scored: 41 (5.13 per match)
- Points scored: 29 (3.63 per match)

The 1911 Cork Senior Hurling Championship was the 24th staging of the Cork Senior Hurling Championship since its establishment by the Cork County Board in 1887. The championship began on 2 April 1911 and ended on 10 December 1911.

Blackrock were the defending champions.

On 10 December 1911, Blackrock won the championship following a 3–2 to 0–00 defeat of Aghabullogue in the final. This was their 12th championship title overall and their second title in succession.

== Results ==
=== First round ===
2 April 1911 First round	Carrigtwohill	3-01 - 3-01	Redmonds	Riverstown Sportsfield, Sallybrook

16 April 1911 First round	St. Finbarr's	5-00 - 2-01	Sarsfields	Cork Athletic Grounds, Cork

7 May 1911 First round replay	Carrigtwohill	3-04 - 4-01	Redmonds	Midleton Sportsfield, Midleton

14 May 1911 First round	Blackrock	5-00 - 1-01	Dungourney	Cork Athletic Grounds, Cork

28 May 1911 First round second replay	Carrigtwohill	2-03 - 1-05	Redmonds	Carrignafoy Sportsfield, Cobh

=== Semi-finals ===
11 June 1911 Semi-final	Blackrock	2-04 - 2-03	St. Finbarr's	Cork Athletic Grounds, Cork
				Referee: M O'Riordan (Cork Co. Board)

16 July 1911 Semi-final	Aghabullogue	3-02 - 2-01	Carrigtwohill	Cork Athletic Grounds, Cork

=== Final ===
10 December 1911 Final	Blackrock	3-02 – 0-00	Aghabullogue	Riverstown Sportsfield, Sallybrook
