= 1893 Cork Senior Hurling Championship =

Annual hurling competition season

- Champions: Blackrock (4th title); John Murphy (captain)
- Runners-up: Redmonds; Bill O'Callaghan (captain)

The 1893 Cork Senior Hurling Championship was the seventh staging of the Cork Senior Hurling Championship since its establishment by the Cork County Board in 1887.

Redmonds were the defending champions.

On 25 June 1893, Blackrock won the championship following a 2–05 to 1–01 defeat of Redmonds in the final. This was their fourth championship title and their first title in two championship seasons.

== Results ==
Final

25 June 1893 Final	Blackrock	2-05 – 1-01	Redmonds	Cork Park

== Championship statistics ==
=== Miscellaneous ===
- The Blackrock players were presented with their winners' medals at a meeting of the Cork County Board on 12 September 1893. The medals were in the form of a shield, surmounted by crossed hurleys, with shamrocks at the top and base.
- Following their county championship success, Blackrock represented Cork in the inter-county championship. They became the third Cork team to win the All-Ireland title.
