= 1898 Cork Senior Hurling Championship =

Annual hurling competition season

- Champions: Blackrock (8th title); Pat Coughlan (captain)
- Runners-up: Carrigtwohill; Jeremiah Foughey (captain)

The 1898 Cork Senior Hurling Championship was the 12th staging of the Cork Senior Hurling Championship since its establishment by the Cork County Board in 1887.

Blackrock were the defending champions.

On 11 September 1898, Blackrock won the championship following a 2–9 to 0–2 defeat of Carrigtwohill in the final. This was their eighth championship title overall and their second title in succession.

== Results ==
Semi-finals

28 August 1898 Semi-final	Blackrock	2-06 - 1-02	St. Finbarr's	Cork Park

28 August 1898 Semi-final	Carrigtwohill	4-07 - 1-03	Aghabullogue	Cork Park

Final

11 September 1898 Final	Blackrock	2-09 – 0-02	Carrigtwohill	Cork Park

== Championship statistics ==
=== Miscellaneous ===
- Carrigtwohill reach the final for the first time.
