= Blackrock National Hurling Club =

Gaelic games club in County Cork, Ireland

- Cumann Iománaíochta Náisiunta na Carraige Duibhe
- Founded: 1883
- County: Cork
- Nickname: The Rockies
- Colours
- Grounds: Church Road
- Coordinates: 51°53′35.43″N 8°25′05.87″W

Playing kits
Standard colours

Senior Club Championships
	All Ireland	Munster champions	Cork champions
Hurling:	3	5	33
Camogie:	0	0	2

Blackrock National Hurling Club is a Gaelic Athletic Association club located in Blackrock, Cork, Ireland. The club is affiliated to the Seandún Board and the Cork County Board. As a sister club of St Michael's Gaelic Football Club, Blackrock is solely concerned with hurling.

== Foundation ==
Located in the fishing village of Blackrock, to the southeast of Cork, a hurling club known as Cork Nationals was established in 1883, some 18 months before the foundation of the Gaelic Athletic Association. Hurling had been played in the area long before this, with reports of a match being played against St Finbarr's National Hurling & Football Club in October 1876. The club changed its name in 1888 to National Hurling Club, Blackrock, before later adopting the name Blackrock National Hurling Club.

== History ==
Cork Nationals were the inaugural Cork SHC winners in 1887, however, they were declared the champions without having to play Passage in the final. In spite of this inauspicious start, the club quckly became the preeminent team in the championship and claimed eight Cork SHC titles from nine final appearances between 1887 and 1898. Such was Blackrock's dominance of the local hurling scene that their second team also claimed the Division 2 title in 1895. Blackrock, as the Cork inter-county representatives, also won consecutive All-Ireland SHC titles in 1893 and 1894, following respective and comprehensive defeats of Kilkenny and Dublin.

The early years of the 20th century brought a third All-Ireland SHC for Blackrock, after beating London by 3–16 to 1–01 in the 1903 All-Ireland SHC final. The club also continued its dominance of the local championship and had amassed 15 Cork SHC titles by 1920. This represented just under half of all the available titles since 1887 and three times as many as St Finbarr's and Redmonds. Blackrock set a new record in 1931, with Eudie Coughlan captaining the team to a fourth consecutive Cork SHC title - their 21st title overall - after a 2–04 to 0–03 win over Éire Óg. After dominating the Cork SHC since its inception, it would be 25 years before a Mick Cashman-captained Blackrock team won their 22nd title, after beating Glen Rovers by 2–10 to 2–02 in the 1956 final.

The 1970s saw Blackrock emerge with a new team featuring John Horgan, Tom Cashman, Pat Moylan and the Cummins brothers - Brendan and Ray. Five Cork SHC titles were won between 1971 and 1979, with each of these being subsequently converted into Munster Club SHC triumphs. This record of five provincial club titles stood until 2025, when Ballygunner won their sixth Munster Club SHC title. Blackrock also won All-Ireland Club SHC titles during this period, after defeats of Rathnure (1972 and 1974) and Ballyhale Shamrocks (1979).

Blackrock won its 30th Cork SHC title, after a 14-year lapse, with a 3–17 to 0–08 win over University College Cork in the 1999 final. It was the first of three such titles in four years, with Wayne Sherlock captaining the club to consecutive titles in 2001 and 2002. Blackrock won their 33rd Cork SHC title in 2020, after beating Glen Rovers by 4–26 to 4–18 in the first final to be decided with extra time.

== Honours ==
- All-Ireland Senior Hurling Championship (3): 1893, 1894, 1903
- Munster Senior Hurling Championship (4): 1893, 1894, 1903, 1912
- All-Ireland Senior Club Hurling Championship (3): 1972, 1974, 1979
- Munster Senior Club Hurling Championship (5): 1971, 1973, 1975, 1978, 1979
- Cork Premier Senior Hurling Championship (33): 1887, 1889, 1891, 1893, 1894, 1895, 1897, 1898, 1903, 1908, 1910, 1911, 1912, 1913, 1920, 1924, 1925, 1927, 1929, 1930, 1931, 1956, 1961, 1971, 1973, 1975, 1978, 1979, 1985, 1999, 2001, 2002, 2020
- Croke Cup (3): 1903, 1910, 1913
- Cork Intermediate Hurling Championship (1): 2019
- Cork Junior Hurling Championship (5): 1895, 1901, 1910, 1931, 1947
- Cork City Junior Hurling Championships (7): 1931, 1947, 1949, 1970, 1973, 2003, 2013
- Cork Under-21 A Hurling Championship (5): 1976, 1977, 2012, 2014, 2015
- Cork Minor Hurling Championship (11): 1963, 1966, 1967, 1968, 1969, 1974, 1994, 2009, 2011, 2012, 2013
- Féile na nGael (1): 1971

== Notable hurlers ==
- Tom Cashman: All-Ireland SHC-winning captain (1986)
- Eudie Coughlan: All-Ireland SHC-winning captain (1931)
- Ray Cummins: All-Ireland SHC-winning captain (1976)
- Stephen Hayes: All-Ireland SHC-winning captain (1894)
- John Horgan: All-Ireland Club SHC-winning captain (1972, 1974, 1979)
- John Murphy: All-Ireland SHC-winning captain (1893)
- Seán Óg Murphy: All-Ireland SHC-winning captain (1926, 1928)

== See also ==
- St Michael's
- Blackrock–Glen Rovers hurling rivalry
- Blackrock–St Finbarr's hurling rivalry
