= John Horgan (hurler) =

Irish hurler

Personal information
- Native name: Seán Ó hOrgáin (Irish)
- Nicknames: Blondie, Hoggie
- Born: 25 May 1950 Barrack Street, Cork, Ireland
- Died: 10 June 2016 (aged 66) Rochestown, Cork, Ireland
- Occupation: Driving instructor
- Height: 5 ft 11 in (180 cm)

Sport
- Sport: Hurling
- Position: Left corner-back
Clubs
- Years: Club
- 1966-1968 1968-1981: Passage West; Blackrock
Club titles
- Cork titles: 5
- Munster titles: 5
- All-Ireland Titles: 3
Inter-county
Years	County	Apps (scores)
1969–1981	Cork	26 (0–16)
Inter-county titles
- Munster titles: 6
- All-Irelands: 4
- NHL: 4
- All Stars: 3

John Horgan (25 May 1950 – 10 June 2016) was an Irish hurler whose league and championship career with the Cork senior team spanned twelve years from 1969 to 1981. He is widely regarded as one of the greatest hurlers in the history of the game and as one of the most iconic Cork players of all time.

Born near Barrack Street on the south side of Cork city, Horgan was introduced to hurling by his father, a county junior championship medal winner with Blackrock. He developed his skills at Sullivan's Quay CBS while simultaneously coming to prominence at underage levels with the Passage club, before transferring to Blackrock in 1968. Horgan went on to enjoy a hugely success career over the course of the next decade, becoming the only player to captain a team to three All-Ireland victories. He also won five Munster medals and five county senior championship medals.

Horgan made his debut on the inter-county scene at the age of sixteen when he was picked on the Cork minor panel. From three successive All-Ireland final appearances he won one All-Ireland medal in 1967. He subsequently progressed onto the Cork under-21 team, winning back-to-back All-Ireland medals in 1970 and 1971. Horgan made his senior debut for Cork in the Grounds Tournament in 1969, before later becoming a regular on the team during the 1969-70 league. Over the course of the next decade his blonde hair and his long, sweeping clearances from corner-back, made Horgan a cult hero in Cork. He won his first All-Ireland medal in 1970 before winning three championships in-a-row from 1976 to 1978. Horgan also won six Munster medals and four National Hurling League medals. As captain of the team in two separate championship campaigns, he also collected three All-Star awards between 1974 and 1978, while he was named Hurler of the Year in 1978. Horgan played his last game for Cork in June 1981.

Between 1971 and 1980, Horgan lined out for Munster in six inter-provincial championship campaigns. He won two Railway Cup medals in 1976 and 1978.

In retirement from playing Horgan became involved in team management and coaching. After coaching the Blackrock senior team during their unsuccessful 1982 championship campaign, he took a complete break from hurling for over a decade. Horgan returned as coach of the Douglas and Castleyons senior teams, guiding the latter to their first championship semi-final appearance in 2001.

Horgan is widely regarded as one of the greatest and most popular club and county hurlers of his era. In retirement from playing he has been repeatedly voted onto teams made up of the sport's greats, including at left corner-back on the Club Hurling Silver Jubilee Team in 1996 and the Supreme All-Stars team in 2001. Horgan was also chosen as one of the 125 greatest hurlers of all time in a 2009 poll.

After battling illness for several years, Horgan died on 10 June 2016. His death was the first from Cork's 1976-1978 All-Ireland-winning three-in-a-row team.

== Playing career ==
=== Club ===
==== Early years ====
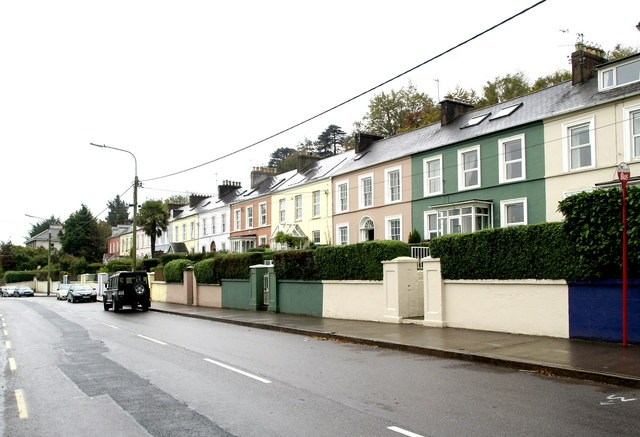
Horgan began his senior club hurling career with Passage West in 1966.

Horgan began his club hurling career with Passage West, however, after a largely unsuccessful juvenile and underage career he transferred to Blackrock in 1968.

Horgan was just 21-years-old when he was chosen by his peers to captain the Blackrock senior team for the 1971 championship campaign. It was a successful campaign which led to the Rockies qualifying for their first county final in eight years. St. Finbarr's were the opponents and took a strong 2-0 to 0-2 lead after just eight minutes. A torrential downpour before the game made conditions very difficult and tempers boiled over with Simon Murphy and Charlie Cullinane being sent to the line. Blackrock fought back and a Ray Cummins goal in the 24th minute helped to level matters at the interval. Charlie McCarthy completed his hat-trick to give St. Finbarr's the lead early in the second half, however, Blackrock's youth and fitness were key in securing a 2-19 to 5-4 victory. Not only was it Horgan's first championship medal but he also had the honour of collecting the Seán Óg Murphy Cup as captain. Due to the unsporting manner of the contest the Cork County Board later fined the two teams a combined total of £30 and suspended five players, including Horgan, for a period of two months. This suspension had little impact on Blackrock's subsequent Munster Championship campaign, with Horgan being reinstated by the time his side faced Moyne-Templetuohy in the provincial decider. An impressive 4–10 to 3–1 victory gave him his first Munster medal. Blackrock subsequently qualified for an All-Ireland final meeting with rathnure on 14 May 1972. The Leinster champions were in arrears by twelve points at one stage, however, they launched a stunning comeback to cut the deficit down to one point. Blackrock stubbornly held on to secure a 5-13 to 6-9 victory. Not only was Horgan's first All-Ireland medal but he also had the honour of receiving the cup as captain.

==== National dominance ====
Blackrock surrendered their county, provincial and national titles the following year, however, they qualified for the county final once again in 1973. Reigning champions Glen Rovers provided the opposition and, after dominating the first half, held a 1-8 to 0-6 interval lead. Horgan had an outstanding second half and scored a trademark point from a 70-yards free. Blackrock held a point lead from the 55th minute and survived two Glen Rovers raids before securing a 2-12 to 2-10 victory. It was Horgan's second county championship medal. Newmarket-on-Fergus were the opponents as Blackrock reached another Munster final. There were never more than a few points between the teams throughout the match, with Newmarket spurning a goal chance just before the interval. Blackrock held out for a narrow 1-13 to 0-14 victory and Horgan collected a second winners' medal. The All-Ireland final on 17 March 1974 saw Blackrock and Rathnure renew their rivalry once again. Dan Quigley netted the first goal for Rathnure, however, Éamonn O'Donoghue secured Blackrock's first goal seconds later when he kicked the sliotar over the goal-line. Half-time saw the sides retire having scored 1-7 apiece. Donie Collins put Blackrock ahead early in the second half, however, Quigley soon scored his second to restore parity. A ten-minute period of dominance by Blackrock yielded only three points, while Quigley completed his hat-trick with a goal from a 21-yards free to give Rathnure a one-point lead. Pat Moylan secured the equaliser. The replay on 28 April 1974 produced a tension-charged climax as Blackrock turned almost certain defeat into victory. The first half saw a number of unsavoury incidents, with John O'Halloran (Blackrock) and Mick Mooney (Rathnure) becoming the first players ever to be sent off in an All-Ireland club final. As the game entered stoppage time, Rathnure held a one-point lead. Blackrock's Donie Collins sent in a ground shot which goalkeeper Michael Foley let slip through his legs. Éamonn O'Donoghue secured the victory with a goal in the second minute of injury time. The 3-8 to 1-9 victory gave Horgan a second All-Ireland medal as captain.

Once again back-to-back championship titles eluded the Rockies, however, they qualified for the county final in 1975. The game against Glen Rovers was expected to be an exciting affair, however, the expectation was not fulfilled. The half-back line of Frank Cummins, Horgan and Dermot McCurtain closed down the Glen attack and contributed greatly to the 4-11 to 0-10 victory. It was Horgan's third winners' medal at county level. The subsequent provincial decider saw Mount Sion provided the opposition, however, Blackrock were in impressive form. Horgan was the star at centre-back before having to retire late in the game with an injury. Ray Cummuns scored 3-3 as Blackrock powered to an 8-12 to 3-8 victory and a third Munster medal for Horgan. Blackrock entered the All-Ireland final on 14 March 1976 and got off to a great start as Éamonn O'Donoghue scored a goal inside the first minute. A goal from a Pat Moylan penalty in the 16th minute gave Blackrock a lead of 2-1 with James Stephens yet to score. The Village then made a vital switch as Joe Hennessy was moved from right wing-forward to right wing-back. By half time James Stephens had cut the lead to five points as they trailed by 2-2 to 0-3. James Stephens were transformed in the second half with their full-back and half-back lines repelling the Blackrock attack. A draw looked likely as the game entered the final stage, however, a last minute Mick Leahy goal put the game beyond doubt as James Stephens claimed a 2-10 to 2-4 victory.

After defeat at the hands of Glen Rovers in 1976, it took Blackrock two years before they qualified for their next county final. Glen Rovers were the opponents once again, with the game remaining on an even keel for 40 minutes. Blackrock took over for the last period, winning the game by 4-12 to 1-7. It was Horgan's fourth championship medal and his third as captain of the team. Once again the Rockies stormed through the provincial championship and defeated Newmarket-on-Fergus by 3-8 to 1-8 in the decider, giving Horgan a fourth Munster medal. On 25 March 1979, Blackrock faced Ballyhale Shamrocks in the All-Ireland final. The first half was completely dominated by Horgan's side who opened the scoring with a goal from a 21-yards free by Pat Moylan in the first minute. Two further goals by Ray Cummins in the 17th and 18th minutes put Blackrock ahead by 3-2 to 0-2. A third goal by Éamonn O'Sullivan helped them to reach half-time in the comfortable position of being 12 points ahead. Blackrock appeared to have the game wrapped up when Tom Lyons whipped through a goal to leave them 14 points ahead with just a quarter of an hour left to play. Ger Fennelly pointed a free to reduce the deficit for Ballyhale, before Pat Holden, Kevin Fennelly and Liam Fennelly scored three goals without reply. Moylan pointed to reinforce the lead for Blackrock, however, a long shot from out the field landed in the Blackrock square before Brendan Fennelly got the final touch to send it over the line. The referee originally signalled a free to Blackrock, however, after consulting with his umpires he awarded the goal. This left the Shamrocks trailing by two points, however, they failed to score in the remaining time as the Rockies won by 5-7 to 5-5. For the third time in his career Horgan had captained his club to the All-Ireland title.

==== Decline ====
Blackrock qualified for their seventh county championship decider of the decade in 1979. St. Finbarr's provided the opposition in what was the sides' first final meeting since 1971. The Barr's took a one-point lead in the 20th minute after John Allen struck for a goal. Blackrock responded with a 1-1 from Frank Cummins and Tom Lyons. St. Finbarr's missed two gilt-edged goal opportunities in the second half, as Blackrock claimed a 2-14 to 2-6 victory. It was Horgan's fifth winners' medal in the championship. After missing Blackrock's 0-13 to 1-8 Munster final triumph over Dunhill, Horgan was returned to the team for the subsequent All-Ireland semi-final. Castlegar of Galway shocked the reigning champions with a 2-9 to 0-9 defeat.

=== Minor and under-21 ===
Horgan made his Cork minor debut on 24 July 1966. Having played no part in the early provincial rounds, he was included at right wing-back on the Cork starting fifteen for the final against Galway. Liam Comer and Frank Keane did the damage in the full-forward line, scoring 4-1 between them, as Cork secured a 6-7 to 2-8 victory. It was Horgan's first Munster medal. After playing no part in the All-Ireland semi-final, Horgan was reinstated at centre-back for the All-Ireland final on 4 September 1966. Opponents Wexford justified their favourites' tag as, aided by a stiff breeze, they took a 4-6 to 2-3 interval lead. Bernie Meade launched the fightback for the Rebels, scoring 2-5 of the Cork total, as cork secured a 6-7 apiece draw. The replay on 16 October was also a close affair. Wexford only scored one point during the first 40 minutes as Cork seemed to have the title secured after scoring 1-7 in the same period. Wexford fought back and a four-goal blitz denied Horgan an All-Ireland medal after a 4-1 to 1-8 defeat.

Eligible for the minor grade once again in 1967, Horgan was at centre-back as Cork qualified for a Munster final meeting with Limerick. Cork raced into the attack and were ahead by 3-3 to 0-2 at half-time. Horgan was described in the Irish Times as being the "outstanding player on view", and he collected a second successive winners' medal following a 4-10 to 0-3 victory. Cork later faced Wexford in the All-Ireland final on 3 September 1967. Horgan scored three trademark long-range points from centre-back and collected an All-Ireland medal as Cork avenged the 1966 defeat with a 2-15 to 5-3 victory.

For the third successive year, Cork qualified for the Munster final in 1968. Horgan's side overwhelmed Waterford and ran out the easiest of 7-8 to 4-2 winners. It was his third Munster medal. On 1 September 1968, Wexford provided the opposition in the All-Ireland final. Cork led by 3-2 to 0-7 at half-time, however, Wexford fought back to take the lead with time running out. After using their allotted number of substitutes, Wexford played the last three minutes with only fourteen players after Larry Byrne had to retire injured. A 2-13 to 3-7 scoreline resulted in a second All-Ireland final defeat for Horgan.

After failing to make the Corm under-21 team in 1969, Horgan was added to the starting fifteen as centre-back in 1970. Cork qualified for a Munster final meeting with Tipperary that year and, after a slow start, they took a 2-5 to 1-5 half-time lead. Paddy Ring top scored with 1-7 as Cork secured a 3-11 to 2-7 victory. It was Horgan's first Munster medal in the under-21 grade. Old rivals Wexford provided the opposition as Cork qualified for the All-Ireland final on 11 October 1970. Both sides couldn't be separated over the last 17 minutes, with Wexford's Mick Butler scoring a total of 1-10 in the 2-11 to 3-8 draw. The replay on 1 November 1970 was much more conclusive, with Cork blitzing Wexford with 4-4 just before half-time. Connie Kelly top scored for the Rebels with 2-7. The 5-17 to 0-8 victory secured an All-Ireland medal for Horgan.

Horgan was moved to corner-back in 1971, as the Cork under-21 team set out to secure a remarkable fourth successive All-Ireland title. A 5-11 to 4-9 defeat of Tipperary gave Horgan a second successive provincial winners' medal. Once again Cork clashed with Wexford in the All-Ireland final on 12 September 1971, with the Leinster champions leading at several stages for three-quarters of the match. Full-forward John Rothwell scored four goals as Cork secured a 7-8 to 1-11 victory. In what was his last game in the under-21 grade, Horgan collected a second successive All-Ireland medal.

=== Senior ===
==== Early success ====
Horgan made his senior debut for Cork on 12 October 1969 in a 1-15 to 1-3 defeat of Wexford in the semi-final of the Grounds Tournament. He became a regular starter throughout the subsequent league before making his championship debut in a 4-13 to 3-6 Munster semi-final defeat of Limerick. This victory qualified Cork for a Munster final meeting with Tipperary, in what was the first 80-minute provincial decider. Leading by eight points early in the second half, Tipperary had to play the majority of the match with fourteen men after Liam King was dismissed in the opening half. Cork laboured in attack, however, two goals from Willie Walsh and a third from Charlie Cullinane secured a narrow 3-10 to 3-8 victory. It was Horgan's first Munster medal. Cork subsequently qualified to play Wexford in the All-Ireland final on 6 September 1970. Horgan, at left corner-back, came in for praise with the other members of the full-back line - Tony Maher and Pat McDonnell - in quelling the Wexford attack. A record 64-point scoreline and eleven goals were produced in a sometimes ill-tempered and disappointing contest. Tony Doran top scored for Wexford with two goals, however, the day belonged to Eddie O'Brien who scored a hat-trick of goals for Cork from his hand. A remarkable 6–21 to 5–10 score line gave Cork the victory and gave Horgan his first All-Ireland medal. A week after the All-Ireland victory, Cork travelled to the United States where they faced New York in the league final. Cork won the two-leg series of game on an aggregate score of 5-21 to 6-16, with Horgan adding a National Hurling League medal to his collection.

==== Team exclusion ====
As Cork began their defence of their championship titles in 1971, Horgan was moved to centre-back for Cork's opening game. He scored two points from that position, however, Limerick were the winners by 2-16 to 2-14.

After falling out of favour with the Cork selectors in early 1972, Horgan was dropped from the team. He was added to the list of substitutes for the drawn Munster final with Tipperary before being dropped from the panel for all subsequent games. He was returned to the team for a league game against Clare in the opening rounds of the 1972-73 season, before regaining his place on Cork's championship starting fifteen.

Horgan was appointed captain of the Cork team in 1974 and was at his customary position of left corner-back for Cork's league final meeting with Limerick. An Éamonn O'Donoghue hat-trick was one of the highlights for Cork, who routed their opponents by 6-15 to 1-12. It was Horgan's second league medal. A disappointing championship campaign followed for Cork, with Horgan being dropped from the panel once again after a loss of form. It was during his time off the team that Horgan collected his first All-Star award, a move which saw his return to the Cork panel.

After a return to form, Horgan was included on Cork's championship panel in 1975. Cork qualified for the Munster final, however, Horgan, after an impressive display against Clare in the semi-final, started the match on the bench. He was introduced as a substitute and collected a second Munster medal as Cork defeated Limerick by 3-14 to 0-12.

==== Three-in-a-row ====
In 1976 Horgan was restored to Cork's starting fifteen where he occupied the centre-back position. Cork qualified for the Munster final once again, however, he had a tough game at centre-back against Limerick. Cork enjoyed a relatively easy 3-15 to 4-5 victory, with Horgan collecting a third Munster medal. After his poor performance in the provincial decider, Horgan was dropped from the starting fifteen in favour of Pat Barry for Cork's All-Ireland final meeting with Wexford on 5 September 1976. Cork got off to one of the worst ever starts in an All-Ireland final and they trailed by 2-2 to no score after just six minutes. Cork rallied to level the score at the interval, with Horgan being introduced as a substitute for Pat Barry in the 42nd minute. Wexford had a two-point lead with ten minutes to go, however, three points from Jimmy Barry-Murphy, two from Pat Moylan and a held effort from Ray Cummins gave Cork a 2–21 to 4–11 victory. It was Horgan's second All-Ireland medal.

After an unhappy year at centre-back, Horgan was switched to his more natural left corner-back position in 1977. Cork qualified for a Munster final meeting with Clare, on a day when armed robbers made away with the takings from the gate of £24,579 during the second half of the game. Clare conceded an early penalty but they fought back to take the lead. A contentious red card for full-back Jim Power turned the tide for Cork and they fought on win by 4–15 to 4–10, with Horgan collecting a fourth winners' medal. The subsequent All-Ireland decider on 4 September 1977 was a repeat of the previous year as Wexford stood in the way of a second successive title for Cork. Seánie O'Leary played the game with a broken nose after being hit in the face by a sliotar in a pre-match warm-up while the two oldest men on the team, Denis Coughlan and Gerald McCarthy, gave noteworthy displays. Martin Coleman brought off a match-winning save from Christy Keogh in the dying seconds to foil the Wexford comeback. A 1–17 to 3–8 victory gave Horgan his third All-Ireland medal. His recall to the team was further vindicated when was presented with a second All-Star award in October of that year.

Horgan retained the left corner-back berth in 1978, adding attack to the defensive position by scoring three points against Waterford in the Munster semi-final. The subsequent provincial final was a repeat of the previous year, with a bumper crowd of 54,181 in attendance to see Cork face Clare. Before the game even began, Horgan was in trouble as he got stuck in traffic and had to persuade some Gardaí to escort him through the huge crowds to the stadium. Cork’s attack in the first half was a shambles, hitting thirteen wides and only leading by 0-5 to 0-3. Cork came out a different team after the interval and took a five-point lead. Clare rallied, however, a last-minute goal chance by Ger Loughnane went inches over the bar. Horgan was Cork's second highest scorer with four points, and the narrow 0-13 to 0-11 victory gave him a fifth Munster medal. On 3 September 1978, Cork faced Kilkenny in the All-Ireland final and the chance of securing a third successive championship. The game was not the classic that many expected. Cork were never really troubled over the course of the seventy minutes and a Jimmy Barry-Murphy goal helped the team to a 1–15 to 2–8 victory over their age-old rivals. This victory gave Cork a third All-Ireland title in succession and gave Horgan a fourth All-Ireland medal. He finished off the year by being named the Texaco Hurler of the Year.

==== Final victories ====
For the second time in his career, Horgan was awarded the Cork captaincy for the 1979 season. Cork had a relatively easy passage through the provincial series of games, with Horgan winning a sixth Munster medal following a 2-14 to 0-9 trouncing of Limerick. This victory paved the way for Cork to secure a record-equalling fourth successive All-Ireland title, and for Horgan to become the first Cork player since Seán Condon in 1944 to captain Cork to the four-in-a-row. Age and the exertions of the three previous campaigns finally caught up with Cork in the All-Ireland semi-final and a 2–14 to 1–13 defeat by Galway brought the four-in-a-row dream to an end.

Cork regrouped during the 1979-80 league and qualified for the final against Limerick. Horgan was at left corner-back, however, a late Limerick goal secured a 2-10 apiece draw. He was confined to the substitutes' bench for the subsequent 4-15 to 4-6 replay victory. For the third time in ten weeks, Cork and Limerick faced each other, however, this time it was in the Munster final and Cork were hoping to achieve a record-breaking sixth successive title. A narrow and unexpected 2-14 to 2-10 defeat brought an end to Cork's championship campaign.

For the second year in succession Cork qualified for the league decider with first-time finalists Offaly providing the opposition. Cork had scored 2-3 within the opening five minutes, however, Offaly fought back. Horgan scored two points from two 70-yards frees and collected his fourth league winners' medal following a 3-11 to 2-8 victory. Cork's championship campaign ended with a 2-15 to 2-13 Munster semi-final defeat by Clare. This was Horgan's last game for Cork as the recurrence of an Achilles tendon problem hastened his retirement from hurling.

=== Inter-provincial ===
Horgan won two Railway Cup medals in 1976 and 1978.

Horgan was selected on the Munster inter-provincial team for the first time in 1971. He was at left corner-back as Munster faced Leinster in the final on 17 March 1971. Munster fell flat on the day, however, Horgan escaped any criticism with a great display in repelling the Leinster attack. The 2-17 to 2-12 score line resulted in defeat for Munster.

After being excluded from the team for the next four years, Horgan was back on the starting fifteen as Munster faced Leinster in the 1976 final. With ten minutes remaining Munster held a seemingly unassailable 4-9 to 0-7 lead, however, Leinster launched a stunning comeback. Goals from Eddie Keher (two), Frank Cummins and Martin Quigley nearly sealed a remarkable victory, however, Munster held out for a 4-9 to 4-8 victory. It was Horgan's first Railway Cup medal.

Horgan was selected for Munster again in 1977, as the southern province faced Leinster in the decider. While the standard of hurling was regarded as poor, Horgan gave a sound display in the full-back line once again, including scoring a point from 104 yards. A Leinster team dominated by Kilkenny and Wexford players secured a 2-17 to 1-13 victory.

After receiving a bye to the 1978 final, Horgan was included at left corner-back as old rivals Leinster provided the opposition. Goals from Joe McKenna and Noel Casey proved the difference, with Horgan collecting a second Railway Cup medal following a 3-13 to 1-11 victory.

Defeat in the semi-final was Munster's fate during the 1979 campaign, however, Horgan was included on the Munster team once again for the 1980 decider against Connacht. He played no part in the game as Connacht ended a 33-year wait for a Railway Cup title.

== Coaching career ==
Immediately after retiring from hurling, Horgan took over as coach of the Blackrock senior team for the 1982 season. It was a relatively successful year as the Rockies qualified for the county final against St. Finbarr's. Veteran forward Ray Cummins scored a hat-trick of goals, however, Blackrock were overly-dependent on him. The Irish Examiner correspondent described the St. Finbarr's performance as "the finest he had ever seen in a county final", as they secured their third successive championship following a 2-17 to 3-9 victory.

For much of the next twenty years Horgan played no part as a coach at either club or county level, however, he ended his self-imposed retirement when he took charge of the Castlyons senior team in 2001. Defeats of Ballincollig, Muskerry and Na Piarsiagh set up a semi-final meeting with Horgan's old club Blackrock. Castlelyons had never reached this stage of the championship before, however, it proved a bridge too far as the Rockies won before later claiming the championship.

Horgan also enjoyed a term as coach of the Douglas senior team in 2006.

== Biography ==
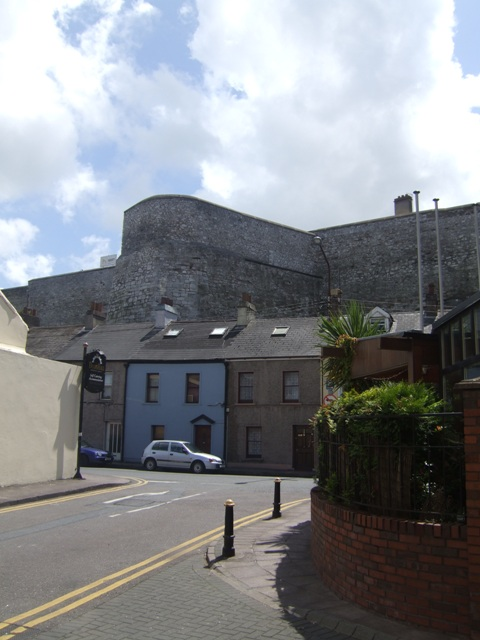
Horgan was born in the shadow of Elizabeth Fort on Barrack Street in 1950.

John Horgan was born on 25 May 1950 at Barrack Street in the heart of Cork city. He had one sister, Hilda, and in the early 1950s the family moved from the city centre to Passage West. Horgan was educated at Sullivan's Quay CBS where he developed both his hurling and academic skills.

After spending much of his adult life working as a coal merchant, Horgan opened his own pub in Ringaskiddy in the early 1990s. He later ran a successful school of motoring in Rochestown.

Horgan had suffered from Parkinson's disease for several years before his death on 8 June 2016. He is survived by his wife Elizabeth "Liz" Horgan (née McCarthy) and four daughters; Gillian, Laraine, Debbie and Ashleigh.

== Honours ==
=== Team ===
Blackrock

- All-Ireland Senior Club Hurling Championship (3): 1972 (c), 1974 (c), 1979 (c)
- Munster Senior Club Hurling Championship (5): 1971 (c), 1973 (c), 1975, 1978 (c), 1979 (sub)
- Cork Senior Club Hurling Championship (5): 1971 (c), 1973 (c), 1975, 1978 (c), 1979

Cork

- All-Ireland Senior Hurling Championship (4): 1970, 1976, 1977, 1978
- Munster Senior Hurling Championship (6): 1970, 1975, 1976, 1977, 1978, 1979 (c)
- National Hurling League (4): 1969–70, 1973–74 (c), 1979–80 (sub), 1980–81
- All-Ireland Under-21 Hurling Championship (2): 1970, 1971
- Munster Under-21 Hurling Championship (2): 1970, 1971
- All-Ireland Minor Hurling Championship (1): 1967
- Munster Minor Hurling Championship (3): 1966, 1967, 1968

Munster

- Railway Cup (2): 1976, 1978

=== Individual ===
Awards

- Texaco Hurler of the Year (1): 1978
- All-Star Awards (3): 1974, 1977, 1978
- Left corner-back on the Club Hurling Silver Jubilee Team: 1971–1996

Sporting positions
Preceded by Denis Coughlan	Cork Senior Hurling Captain; 1974	Succeeded by Gerald McCarthy
Preceded by Charlie McCarthy	Cork Senior Hurling Captain; 1979	Succeeded by Dermot McCurtain
Awards
Preceded by Denis Coughlan (Cork)	Texaco Hurler of the Year; 1978	Succeeded by Ger Henderson (Kilkenny)
Achievements
Preceded by Donie Moloney (Roscrea)	All-Ireland Senior Club Hurling Final winning captain 1972	Succeeded by Denis Coughlan (Glen Rovers)
Preceded by Denis Coughlan (Glen Rovers)	All-Ireland Senior Club Hurling Final winning captain 1974	Succeeded by Jim Power (St. Finbarr's)
Preceded by Denis Burns (St. Finbarr's)	All-Ireland Senior Club Hurling Final winning captain 1979	Succeeded by Michael Connolly (Castlegar)
