= Mick Malone (hurler) =

Irish hurler

Personal information
- Native name: Mícheál Ó Maoileoin (Irish)
- Born: 1950 (age 75–76) Farran, County Cork, Ireland
- Occupation: Solicitor
- Height: 5 ft 9 in (175 cm)

Sport
- Sport: Hurling
- Position: Right wing-forward
Clubs
Years	Club	Apps (scores)
1966–1987 1967–1978	Éire Óg → Muskerry	9 (2-04); 18 (7–19)
Club titles
- Cork titles: 0
Inter-county
Years	County	Apps (scores)
1971–1980	Cork	18 (4–22)
Inter-county titles
- Munster titles: 4
- All-Irelands: 2
- NHL: 2
- All Stars: 2

Michael Malone (born 1950) is an Irish retired hurler who played as a right wing-forward for the Cork senior team.

Malone joined the team during the 1971 championship and was a regular member of the starting fifteen until his retirement after the 1978 championship. During that time he won two All-Ireland medals, four Munster medals, two National League medals and two All-Star awards. Malone was an All-Ireland runner-up on one occasion.

At club level Malone played with Éire Óg.

== Playing career ==
=== Club ===
Malone played his club hurling and Gaelic football with Éire Óg and enjoyed much success in a lengthy career.

After winning a number of divisional championships in the early 1970s, Éire Óg made a breakthrough at county level in 1977. A narrow 2–8 to 1–9 defeat of Erin's Own gave Malone a junior championship medal.

After securing promotion to intermediate status, Éire Óg reached the championship decider in that grade in 1979. A high-scoring 7–11 to 5–8 defeat of Mallow gave Malone an intermediate championship medal.

=== Minor and under-21 ===
Malone first came to prominence on the inter-county scene as a member of the Cork minor hurling team in 1967. He made his debut in the Munster quarter-final defeat of Waterford that year and later collected a Munster medal following a 4–10 to 0–3 rout of Limerick. Cork later faced Wexford in the All-Ireland decider. A 2–15 to 5–3 victory gave Malone an All-Ireland Minor Hurling Championship medal.

Cork retained the provincial title in 1968 with Malone collecting his second Munster medal following a high-scoring 7–8 to 5–4 defeat of Waterford. For the third successive Wexford provided the opposition in the All-Ireland decider and went on to claim a 2–13 to 3–7 victory.

Malone progressed onto the Cork under-21 team in 1968 and enjoyed immediate success on one of the most successful teams of all time in that grade. Tipperary were bested by 4–10 to 1–13 to secure a first Munster medal as Malone was introduced as a substitute. Cork later defeated Kilkenny by 2–18 to 3–9 and, in spite of being an unused substitute, Malone collected his first All-Ireland medal in that grade.

In 1969 Cork had an even more comprehensive victory over Tipp in the provincial decider and Malone added a second Munster medal to his collection. Old rivals Wexford provided the opposition in the subsequent All-Ireland final and a high-scoring game ensued. A 5–13 to 4–7 victory gave Malone a second consecutive All-Ireland medal, however, once again he was an unused sub.

Having retained the title, Cork set out to become the first team to win three successive under-21 championships. Malone collected a third Munster medal that year following a 3–11 to 2–7 defeat of Tipperary once again. Cork faced their old rivals Wexford in the subsequent All-Ireland decider, however, that game ended in a draw. In the replay Malone was dropped from the starting fifteen, however, Cork went into overdrive and he won a third All-Ireland medal as an unused sub following a 5–17 to 0–8 thrashing.

Malone was eligible for the under-21 grade once again in 1971, and added a fourth Munster medal to his collection as Tipp were downed once again. Wexford stood in the way of Cork securing a remarkable fourth successive championship and a high-scoring game ensued. A 7–8 to 1–11 victory gave Malone a record fourth All-Ireland medal, his first on the field of play.

=== Senior ===
Malone made his senior debut for Cork in a Munster semi-final defeat by Limerick in 1971 and immediately became a regular member of the starting fifteen.

Cork set down an early marker in 1972 and a narrow 3–14 to 2–14 defeat of Limerick in the decider gave Malone his first National Hurling League medal. A subsequent 6–18 to 2–8 thrashing of Clare gave him his first Munster medal. The subsequent All-Ireland decider saw Cork face Kilkenny. The Rebels dominated the early exchanges and went eight points clear after a long-range score from wing-back Con Roche in the 17th minute of the second half. Remarkably they didn't didn't score again. Kilkenny took control with Pat Henderson a key figure at centre-back and Eddie Keher cutting loose up front. They were level after a Frank Cummins goal and went on to win by eight points.

In 1974 Malone won a second National League medal as Cork defeated Limerick on a huge score line of 6–15 to 1–12 in the decider.

After being dropped from the panel in 1975, Malone returned the following year and collected a second Munster medal as Limerick were bested once again. The subsequent All-Ireland final saw Cork face old rivals Wexford. In one of the worst starts to a championship decider, Cork were 2–2 to no score in arrears after just six minutes. The Rebels fought back to level matters by half-time, however, it was the long-range point-scoring by Pat Moylan that turned the game for Cork. A 2–21 to 4–11 victory gave Malone his first All-Ireland medal.

Malone was back on the starting fifteen in 1977. A 4–15 to 4–10 defeat of newly crowned National League champions Clare gave him a third Munster medal. The subsequent All-Ireland decider was a repeat of the previous year as Wexford stood in the way of a second successive title. Seánie O'Leary played the game with a broken nose after being hit in the face by a sliotar in a pre-match warm-up while the two oldest men on the team, Denis Coughlan and Gerald McCarthy, gave noteworthy displays. Martin Coleman made some miraculous saves in the dying minutes as Cork held on for a 1–17 to 3–8 victory. It was Malone's second All-Ireland medal.

In 1978 Cork set out to secure an impressive third successive All-Ireland title. The team go off to a good start, however, Malone remained scoreless in a 0–13 to 0–11 defeat of Clare in a dour provincial decider. It was his fourth Munster medal. Malone subsequently left the panel and missed Cork's All-Ireland victory over Kilkenny.

=== Inter-provincial ===
Malone also had the honour of being selected for Munster in the inter-provincial series of games. He made his sole appearance with the province in 1973, however, Leinster defeated Munster by 1–13 to 2–8 in the Railway Cup decider.

== Honours ==
Éire Óg

- Cork Intermediate Hurling Championship: 1979
- Cork Junior Hurling Championship: 1977
- Mid Cork Junior A Hurling Championship: 1971, 1972, 1977

Cork

- All-Ireland Senior Hurling Championship: 1976, 1977
- Munster Senior Hurling Championship: 1972, 1976, 1977, 1978
- National Hurling League: 1971–72, 1973–74
- All-Ireland Under-21 Hurling Championship: 1968, 1969, 1970, 1971
- Munster Under-21 Hurling Championship: 1968, 1969, 1970, 1971
- All-Ireland Minor Hurling Championship: 1967
- Munster Minor Hurling Championship: 1967, 1968
