= Martin Casey =

Irish hurler (born 1950)

Personal information
- Native name: Máirtín Ó Cathasaigh (Irish)
- Born: 1950 (age 75–76) Causeway, County Kerry, Ireland
- Occupation: Roman Catholic priest

Sport
- Sport: Hurling
- Position: Midfielder
Clubs
- Years: Club
- Causeway; Buffer's Alley
Club titles
- Wexford titles: 12
- Leinster titles: 3
- All-Ireland Titles: 1
Inter-county*
Years	County	Apps (scores)
1974-1983	Wexford	20 (0-00)
Inter-county titles
- Leinster titles: 1
- All-Irelands: 0
- NHL: 0
- All Stars: 0
- *Inter County team apps and scores correct as of 14:18, 8 July 2014.

Martin Casey (born 1950) is an Irish retired hurler who played as a midfielder for the Wexford senior team.

Born in Causeway, County Kerry, County Kerry, Casey first played competitive hurling during his schooling at St. Peter's College, Wexford. He arrived on the inter-county scene at the age of seventeen when he first linked up with the Wexford minor team, before later joining the under-21 side. He joined the senior panel during the 1974 championship. Casey went on to play a key role for the team for almost a decade, and won one Leinster medal on the field of play. He was an All-Ireland runner-up on two occasions.

At club level Casey is a one-time All-Ireland medallist with Buffer's Alley. In addition to this he also won three Leinster medals and twelve championship medals in a career that spanned four decades.

Throughout his inter-county career, Casey made 20 championship appearances for Wexford. His retirement came following the conclusion of the 1983 championship.

== Honours ==
=== Team ===
St. Peter's College

- All-Ireland Colleges Senior Hurling Championship (2): 1967, 1968
- Leinster Colleges Senior Hurling Championship (2): 1967, 1968

Causeway

- Kerry Under-16 Hurling Championship (1): 1966

Buffer's Alley

- All-Ireland Senior Club Hurling Championship (1): 1989
- Leinster Senior Club Hurling Championship (3): 1985, 1988, 1992
- Wexford Senior Club Hurling Championship (12): 1968, 1970, 1975, 1976, 1982, 1983, 1984, 1985, 1988, 1989, 1991, 1992

Wexford

- Leinster Senior Hurling Championship (2): 1976, 1977 (sub)
- Leinster Under-21 Hurling Championship (3): 1969, 1970, 1972
- All-Ireland Minor Hurling Championship (1): 1968
- Leinster Minor Hurling Championship (2): 1967, 1968
