= Martin Coleman =

Irish hurler and selector

Personal information
- Native name: Máirtín Ó Colmáin (Irish)
- Born: 1 August 1950 (age 76) Ballinhassig, County Cork, Ireland
- Occupation: Publican
- Height: 5 ft 7 in (170 cm)

Sport
- Sport: Hurling
- Position: Goalkeeper
Clubs
- Years: Club
- Ballinhassig; Carrigdhoun
Club titles
- Cork titles: 0
Inter-county
| Years | County | Apps (scores) |
| 1970–1980 | Cork | 19 (0–00) |
Inter-county titles
- Munster titles: 6
- All-Irelands: 4
- NHL: 3
- All Stars: 0

Martin Coleman (born 1 August 1950) is an Irish hurler and selector. His career included All-Ireland Championship victories as goalkeeper with Cork's three-in-a-row team of the 1970s and later as a selector with various Cork teams.

After beginning his career at club level with Ballinhassig, Coleman joined the Cork minor team as a 16-year-old in 1967 and won an All-Ireland Minor Championship in his debut year. After winning back-to-back All-Ireland Under-21 Championships, he was promoted to the Cork senior team in 1970. Coleman eventually succeeded Paddy Barry as Cork's first-choice goalkeeper and made a total of 19 championship appearances in a career that ended with his last appearance in 1980. During that time he was part of four All-Ireland Championship-winning teams – in 1970, 1976, 1977 and 1978. Walsh also secured six Munster Championship medals and three National Hurling League medals.

After his playing career, Coleman found success as an inter-county selector. He was part of the senior management team that guided Cork to the 1990 All-Ireland Championship as well as two Munster Championships and a National League title over a three-year period. He later served as a selector with the Cork under-21 team that secured back-to-back All-Ireland Championships in 1997 and 1998.

== Playing career ==
=== Ballinhassig ===
Coleman first played for the Ballinhassig club at adult level in the late 1960s. He claimed his first major silverware with the club in 1970 when the club secured the South East Junior Championship after a 3-12 to 3-03 defeat of Ballymartle. Coleman's side again defeated Ballylartle to win a second successive divisional title in 1971 before losing out to Bandon in the County Junior Championship. He collected a third divisional winners' medal in four years in 1973 before winning a county junior championship medal following a four-point defeat of Meelin in the final.

Coleman won a Cork Intermediate Championship title in 1975 after Ballinhassig's 3-12 to 2-05 defeat of Blackrock in the final. After one season in the Cork Senior Championship, Ballinhassig regraded to intermediate level and secured a second title in 1977 after a five-point victory over Ballyhea. Coleman's side failed in their attempt to secure a third intermediate title after a 1-14 to 1-06 defeat by Cloughduv in the 1983 final.

=== Cork ===
==== Minor and under-21 ====
Coleman first played for Cork when he joined the minor team as a member of the extended panel in advance of the 1967 Munster Minor Championship. He made his first appearance for the team on 14 May 1967 when he was introduced as a substitute at centre-forward for Kevin Fitzgerald, before later claiming a Munster Minor Championship medal as a non-playing substitute after a 4-10 to 0-03 defeat of Limerick in the final. On 3 September 1967, Coleman was again selected amongst the substitutes for the All-Ireland final and ended the game with a winners' medal after the 2-15 to 5-03 defeat of Wexford. He was again eligible for the minor grade in 1968 and took over from Willie Glavin as first-choice goalkeeper. Coleman claimed his first Munster Championship medal on the field of play that year after the 7-08 to 4-02 victory over Waterford before later lining out in goal in the 2-13 to 3-07 defeat by Wexford in the All-Ireland final.

Two years later, Coleman took over from Bernard Hurley as goalkeeper with the Cork under-21 team and collected his first Munster Under-21 Championship medal after 3-11 to 2-07 defeat of Tipperary in the 1970 Munster final. He later won his first All-Ireland Under-21 Championship medal after again lining out in goal in Cork's 5-17 to 0-08 victory over Wexford in a final replay. Coleman was in his second and final year of being eligible for the under-21 grade when he won a second successive provincial winners' medal following a five-point win over Tipperary. His last game for the team saw Cork secure a record fourth successive All-Ireland Championship, with Coleman claiming a second successive winners' medal after the 7-08 to 1-11 win over Wexford.

==== Senior ====
Coleman's performances at under-21 level saw him supplant John Mitchell as second-choice goalkeeper with the Cork senior team shortly after the 1970 Munster Championship. He made his championship debut on 16 August 1970 as a replacement for the injured Paddy Barry in Cork's 4-20 to 2-09 All-Ireland semi-final defeat of Antrim. Coleman was later included as a panellist for the All-Ireland final against Wexford and ended the game with a winners' medal after the 6-20 to 5-11 victory.

Coleman remained as understudy to Paddy Barry over the next few seasons and claimed his first silverware when he was sub-goalkeeper when Cork defeated Limerick to secure the 1971-72 National League title. Later that year he won his first Munster Championship medal as a non-playing substitute after Cork's 6-18 to 2-08 defeat of Clare in the 1972 Munster final and was also included as a panel member when Cork suffered a 3-24 to 5-11 defeat by Kilkenny in the 1972 All-Ireland final.

Coleman won a second National League winners' medal after Cork defeated Limerick by 6-15 to 1-12 to claim the 1973-74 title. He became Cork's first-choice goalkeeper at the end of the year after Paddy Barry's retirement from inter-county hurling and won his first Munster medal on the field of play following a 3–14 to 0–12 defeat of Limerick in the 1975 Munster final. Coleman ended the season by receiving his first All-Star nomination.

After claiming a third provincial winners' medal in 1976, Coleman later lined out in the first All-Ireland final of his career when Cork faced Wexford. He conceded two goals within the first eight minutes but ended the game with his second winners' medal after Cork staged a comeback to win by 2-21 to 4-11. Coleman ended the season by being nominated for an All-Star for the second year in succession.

Coleman won his fourth Munster Championship medal after a 4-15 to 4-10 defeat of league champions Clare in the 1977 Munster final, before later playing in a second successive All-Ireland final against Wexford. He made a string of vital saves in the last few minutes as Wexford went in search of an equalising goal, however, he collected a second successive winners' medal after the 1-17 to 3-08 victory. Coleman described the win as the "dream of a lifetime realised" and received a third successive All-Star nomination at the end of the season.

Cork completed a four-in-a-row of provincial titles in 1978, with Coleman collecting his fifth winners' medal after the two-point win over Clare in the final. He later claimed a third successive All-Ireland medal, the fourth of his career, after lining out in goal in Cork's 1-15 to 2-08 defeat of Kilkenny in the 1978 All-Ireland final. Coleman was once again nominated for an All-Star.

Cork completed a record-equalling five-in-a-row of Munster Championship victories in 1979, with Coleman collecting his sixth winners' medal after the 2-14 to 0-09 victory over Limerick. He played his last championship game on 5 August 1979 in a 2-14 to 1-13 All-Ireland semi-final defeat by Galway. Coleman was dropped as first-choice goalkeeper in favour of Tim Murphy during the 1979-80 National League, but claimed a third winners' medal in that competition after a nine-point victory over Limerick. He was not included on the Cork panel for the 1980 Munster Championship, a move that effectively ended his inter-county career.

=== Munster ===
Coleman was added to the Munster inter-provincial team as sub-goalkeeper to Séamus Durack in advance of the 1975 Railway Cup and was an unused substitute when the team suffered a 2-09 to 1-11 defeat by Leinster in that year's final. He again served as understudy to Durack the following year, but claimed his first Railway Cup medal after one-point victory over Leinster in the final. After losing the 1977 Railway Cup final to Leinster, Coleman claimed a second winners' medal as a non-playing substitute following a 0-20 to 1-11 victory over Connacht in 1978.

== Coaching career ==
=== Cork ===
==== Senior ====
Coleman narrowly defeated Johnny Clifford for the position of fourth selector with the Cork senior team in October 1989 and was cautious about the future of the team: "A lot of people say new players aren't there, and I would agree to a certain extent. But, Cork hurling is not down either." In his first year as part of the management set-up, he helped guide the team to a double of Munster Championship and All-Ireland Championship victories. Cork achieved this by winning the provincial decider after a surprise eight-point defeat of Tipperary, and a subsequent 5-15 to 2-21 victory over Galway in the All-Ireland final.

The 1990-91 hurling season was a trophyless one for Cork after surrendering the Munster Championship title to Tipperary by five points in a final replay. In spite of this defeat, all four members of the selection committee, including Coleman, were reappointed for a further term. The team remained largely unchanged during the 1991-92 season, with Cork claiming the Munster Championship after a 1-22 to 3-11 win over Limerick before losing the 1992 All-Ireland final to Kilkenny by four points. Coleman remained as a selector for a fourth successive season and helped Cork claim further silverware when they defeated Wexford to win the 1992-93 National League. An unsuccessful championship campaign followed and Coleman failed to secure election to the management committee in October 1993.

==== Under-21 ====
Coleman returned to inter-county coaching when he was added to Bertie Óg Murphy's Cork under-21 management team as a selector in advance of the 1996 Munster Championship. His first season with the team was a successful one, with Cork claiming the Munster Under-21 Championship after a 12-point victory over Clare. Coleman helped Cork to a second successive provincial title in 1997 after a late goal against Tipperary sealed a one-point win. Cork ended the year as All-Ireland Under-21 Championship-winners after a 3-11 to 0-13 victory over Galway.

Coleman was again part of the management team for a third successive year in 1998, with Cork claiming a third successive Munster Under-21 Championship after a 3-18 to 1-10 defeat of Tipperary. He later helped guide Cork to a second successive All-Ireland final victory over Galway. The entire management team stepped down shortly after this victory, however, Coleman returned to as an under-21 selector under Seán O'Gorman for the 2002 Munster Championship.

== Honours ==
=== Team ===
Ballinhassig

- Cork Intermediate Hurling Championship (2): 1975, 1977
- Cork Junior Hurling Championship (1): 1973
- South East Junior A Hurling Championship (3): 1970, 1971, 1973

Cork

- All-Ireland Senior Hurling Championship (4): 1970, 1976, 1977, 1978
- Munster Senior Hurling Championship (6): 1972, 1975, 1976, 1977, 1978, 1979
- National Hurling League (3): 1971-72, 1973-74, 1979-80
- All-Ireland Under-21 Hurling Championship (2): 1970, 1971
- Munster Under-21 Hurling Championship (2): 1970, 1971
- All-Ireland Minor Hurling Championship (1): 1967
- Munster Minor Hurling Championship (1): 1967, 1968

Munster

- Railway Cup (2): 1976, 1978

=== Selector ===
Cork

- All-Ireland Senior Hurling Championship (1): 1990
- Munster Senior Hurling Championship (2): 1990, 1992
- National Hurling League (1): 1992-93
- All-Ireland Under-21 Hurling Championship (2): 1997, 1998
- Munster Under-21 Hurling Championship (3): 1996, 1997, 1998
