= Liam Bennett (hurler) =

Irish hurler (1950–2006)

Personal information
- Born: 1950 Wexford, Ireland
- Died: 18 October 2006 (aged 56) Wexford, Ireland
- Occupation: Painter
- Height: 5 ft 6 in (168 cm)

Sport
- Sport: Hurling
- Position: Right wing-back
Club
- Years: Club
- Faythe Harriers
Club titles
- Wexford titles: 1
Inter-county
- Years: County
- 1970-1983: Wexford
Inter-county titles
- Leinster titles: 3
- All-Irelands: 0
- NHL: 0
- All Stars: 0

Liam Bennett (1950 – 18 October 2006) was an Irish hurler. At club level he played with Faythe Harriers and at inter-county level with various Wexford teams.

== Career ==
Bennett first played hurling at juvenile and underage levels with the Faythe Harriers club in Wexford. During a golden age for the club at underage levels, he won two Wexford MHC medals and three successive Wexford U21HC medals from 1967 to 1969. Bennett was part of the Faythe Harriers team that won the Wexford SHC title in 1981.

At inter-county level, Bennett first played for Wexford as part of the minor team that won the All-Ireland MHC title in 1968. He progressed to the under-21 that lost three successive All-Ireland finals from 1969 to 1971. By that stage, Bennett had been drafted onto the senior team and was an unused substitute when Wexford were beaten by Cork in the 1970 All-Ireland final. He broke onto the team as a wing-back and later a corner-back, and was again part of the Wexford team beaten by Cork in successive All-Ireland finals in 1976 and 1977.

== Death ==
Bennett died at Wexford General Hospital on 18 October 2006 at the age of 56, having taken ill while cycling a few days earlier.

== Honours ==
Faythe Harriers

- Wexford Senior Hurling Championship: 1981
- Wexford Under-21 Hurling Championship: 1967, 1968, 1969
- Wexford Minor Hurling Championship: 1966, 1968

Wexford

- Leinster Senior Hurling Championship: 1970, 1976, 1977
- Leinster Under-21 Hurling Championship: 1969, 1970 (c), 1971
- All-Ireland Minor Hurling Championship: 1968
- Leinster Minor Hurling Championship: 1968

Sporting positions
Preceded by	Wexford under-21 hurling team captain 1970	Succeeded by Martin Quigley
