= Jimmy Barry-Murphy =

Irish Gaelic football player and hurler

Personal information
- Born: 22 August 1954 (age 72) Cork, Ireland
- Occupation: Financial director
- Height: 6 ft 0 in (183 cm)

Sport
- Football Position: Right corner-forward
- Hurling Position: Full-forward
Club
- Years: Club
- 1972–1988: St Finbarr's
Club titles
	Football	Hurling
Cork titles	5	6
Munster titles	2	3
All-Ireland titles	2	2
Inter-county*
Years	County	Apps (scores)
1973–1980 1975–1986	Cork (F); Cork (H)	17 (12–14); 40 (23–52)
Inter-county titles
	Football	Hurling
Munster Titles	2	10
All-Ireland Titles	1	5
League titles	1	2
All-Stars	2	5
- *Inter County team apps and scores correct as of 23:16, 11 October 2012.

James Barry-Murphy (Irish: Séamus de Barra-Ó Murchú; born 22 August 1954) is an Irish hurling manager and former hurler and Gaelic footballer. He was the manager of the senior Cork county hurling team from 2011 to 2015, returning a decade after his first tenure as manager. Barry-Murphy is regarded as one of the best-known players in the history of Gaelic games.

He established himself as a dual player with the St Finbarr's club. A dual four-time All-Ireland medallist with the St Finbarr's senior teams, Barry-Murphy also won a combined total of five Munster medals and ten championship medals.

Barry-Murphy made his debut on the inter-county scene at the age of sixteen when he first linked up with the Cork minor teams as a dual player. An All-Ireland medallist in both codes, he later won a combined total of three All-Ireland medals with the under-21 teams. Barry-Murphy made his senior football debut during the 1973 championship. He went on to play a key role for Cork in attack and won one All-Ireland medal, four Munster medals and one National Football League medal. Barry-Murphy's eleven-year career with the Cork senior hurlers saw him win five All-Ireland medals, a record-equalling ten Munster medals and two National Hurling League medals. He was an All-Ireland runner-up on two occasions.

As a member of the Munster inter-provincial team in both codes, Barry-Murphy won a combined total of five Railway Cup medals. Throughout his inter-county career he made 57 championship appearances. Barry-Murphy retired from inter-county activity on 2 April 1987.

Following a successful tenure as manager of the Cork minor team, culminating in the winning of the All-Ireland title, Barry-Murphy was appointed manager of the Cork senior team in October 1995. His first tenure saw a return to success, with Cork winning one All-Ireland Championship, two Munster Championships and one National League, before stepping down as manager on 8 November 2000. Barry-Murphy subsequently had unsuccessful tenures as coach with the St Finbarr's and Cloughduv club teams. Over a decade after stepping down as Cork manager, Barry-Murphy was appointed for a second stint as Cork manager on 7 September 2011. Once again his managerial reign saw a return to success, with Cork winning one Munster Championship.

On the 26 August 2015 Barry Murphy was inducted into the GAA Hall of Fame.

== Early life ==
Coming from a family of six – including brothers John, Denis, Barry and sisters Miriam and Frances – Barry-Murphy was born into a family steeped in hurling tradition. His granduncle, Dinny Barry-Murphy, was the most successful of the family. He captained Cork and won four All-Ireland titles in the 1920s and 1930s. His grandfather, Finbarr Barry-Murphy, also played with Cork while his father, John Barry-Murphy, won an All-Ireland title in the junior grade with Cork in 1940.

He was educated at Colaiste an Spiorad Naoimh in Bishopstown.

== Club career ==
Barry-Murphy played his club hurling and football with St Finbarr's club on the south side of Cork city. During a career spanning two decades, he won multiple titles with the club.

=== Hurling ===
After playing at underage level with 'the Barr's', Barry-Murphy joined the club's senior team by 1972. His career got off to an inauspicious start that year when he was sent off in a club game and received a two-month suspension.

In 1974 Barry-Murphy won his first county club championship winners' medal following a 2–17 to 2–14 defeat of arch-rivals Blackrock. He later collected a Munster winners' medal before making a clean sweep by adding an All-Ireland winners' medal to his collection following a 3–8 to 1–6 defeat of the Fenians.

Another clean sweep of hurling titles followed for Barry-Murphy in the 1977–78 club championship season. A 1–17 to 1–5 trouncing of north-side rivals Glen Rovers was followed by a Munster final victory over Sixmilebridge after a replay. He subsequently added a second All-Ireland winners' medal to his collection. His goal from a rebound in that game was the deciding factor in sealing the victory over Wexford's Rathnure.

After a brief hiatus St Finbarr's were back in the big time again in 1980. Barry-Murphy won a third county club championship winners' medal as Glen Rovers fell in the final. A third Munster title was later annexed before facing Ballyhale Shamrocks in the All-Ireland final. Not even a late goal from Barry-Murphy, however, could seal a victory over the Kilkenny outfit and 'the Barr's' lost by 1–15 to 1–11.

The 1980 county club championship title was the first set of three consecutive victories for Barry-Murphy and St Finbarr's. He won his final county championship in 1988 following a 3–18 to 2–14 defeat of old rivals Glen Rovers.

=== Gaelic football ===
Barry-Murphy's club football career began at under-age level in 1971 when he won a Cork Minor Football Championship winners' medal following a defeat of St Colman's.

Two years later in 1973 he added a club football under-21 championship winners' medal to his collection when 'the Barr's' defeated Bandon by 4–6 to 2–6.

At senior level Barry-Murphy won his first county club championship winners' medal in 1976 following a 1–10 to 1–7 defeat of St Michael's.

Three years later in 1979 St Finbarr's made a clean sweep of football titles. Barry-Murphy collected a second club football championship winners' medal before securing a Munster winners' medal following a defeat of Kilrush Shamrocks. A subsequent 3–9 to 0–8 defeat of St Grellan's gave Barry-Murphy an All-Ireland winners' medal. That victory gave him the distinction of being a dual All-Ireland club medalist.

The 1980–81 club championship season saw St Finbarr's make another clean sweep of county, provincial and All-Ireland titles. They were his last major victories as a member of 'the Barr's' senior football team.

== Inter-county career ==
Barry-Murphy had a hugely successful dual career with Cork. From his debut with the senior football team in 1973 to his retirement from the senior hurling team in 1986, he won every honour in the game.

=== Gaelic football ===
He first came to prominence on the inter-county scene as a member of the Cork minor football team in 1971. He won his first Munster winner' medal that year before later lining out in the All-Ireland decider. Mayo provided the opposition and defeated Cork by 2–15 to 2–7.

Barry-Murphy was still eligible for the minor grade again in 1972. He added a second Munster winners' medal to his collection that year before later playing in his second consecutive All-Ireland final. Tyrone were the opponents, however, Cork claimed the title by 3–11 to 2–11.

After joining the Cork under-21 football team, Barry-Murphy enjoyed further success. After back-to-back defeats in the provincial deciders of 1972 and 1973, he finally secured a Munster winners' medal in 1974 following a defeat of Kerry.

By this stage Barry-Murphy had joined the Cork senior football team. He was just eighteen years old when he made his senior championship debut in 1973. It was a successful year for the young player as he won his first Munster winners' medal following a 5–12 to 1–15 thrashing of arch-rivals Kerry. Barry-Murphy later lined out with Cork in an All-Ireland final against Galway and proved to be one of the stars of the game, scoring the first of his two goals after just two minutes. One of these goals, where he receives a pass, cheekily solos the ball and waits to pick a spot in the net was chosen as one of RTÉ's Top 20 GAA Moments in 2005. Cork eventually defeated Galway by 3–17 to 2–13 and Barry-Murphy collected an All-Ireland winners' medal.

Barry-Murphy won a second consecutive Munster winners' medal in 1974 and it appeared that Cork footballers were about to become a dominant force. Their championship ambitions came to an end in the All-Ireland semi-final with a defeat by eventual All-Ireland champions Dublin.

Cork's footballers lost the next six Munster finals against a resurgent Kerry team. In spite of this lack of championship success Barry-Murphy added a National League winners' medal to his collection in 1980. He retired from inter-county football later that same year.

=== Hurling ===
Barry-Murphy's inter-county hurling career began as a member of the Cork minor hurling team in 1971. He won a Munster winners' medal in that grade that year before later playing in the All-Ireland final. A 2–11 to 1–11 defeat of Kilkenny gave Barry-Murphy an All-Ireland winners' medal.

1972 saw Cork make it three-in-a-row in Munster, with Barry-Murphy winning his second consecutive provincial winners' medal. He later lined out in a second consecutive All-Ireland decider. Kilkenny gained their revenge for the previous year's defeat by winning the game by 8–7 to 3–9.

After joining the Cork under-21 hurling team, Barry-Murphy enjoyed further success. He won a Munster winners' medal in this grade in 1973 before playing in his first All-Ireland final in that grade. Wexford provided the opposition, however, Cork won by 2–10 to 4–2 and Barry-Murphy secured an All-Ireland winners' medal in that grade.

Two years later in 1975 Barry-Murphy added a second Munster under-21 winners' medal to his collection before playing in his second All-Ireland final. Kilkenny, however, won the game by 5–13 to 2–19 in what was Barry-Murphy's last game in the under-21 grade.

1975 also saw Barry-Murphy make his championship debut for the Cork senior hurling team. He won his first Munster senior winners' medal that year following a 3–15 to 0–12 defeat of Limerick. Cork later looked set for an All-Ireland appearance; however, Galway secured a shock victory.

The following year Barry-Murphy secured a second Munster winners' medal with another huge 4–14 to 3–5 win over Limerick. This victory allowed Cork to advance directly to the All-Ireland final where Wexford provided the opposition. Cork got off to the worst possible start in an All-Ireland final and trailed by 2–2 after six minutes. Cork battled back, however, the game hung in the balance for much of the seventy minutes. With ten minutes left Wexford were two points to the good, however, three points by Barry-Murphy, two by Pat Moylan and a kicked effort from captain Ray Cummins gave Cork a 2–21 to 4–11 victory. It was Barry-Murphy's first All-Ireland winners' medal.

In 1977 Barry-Murphy won a third consecutive Munster winners' medal before lining out in a second All-Ireland final. Wexford were the opponents once again and, like the previous year, the game turned into a close, exciting affair. A Seánie O'Leary goal, together with some brilliant saves by goalkeeper Martin Coleman helped Cork to a 1–17 to 3–8 victory and a second All-Ireland winners' medal for Barry-Murphy.

Cork dominated the championship again in 1978 with Barry-Murphy winning a fourth consecutive Munster winners' medal. This victory paved the way for Cork to take on Kilkenny in the subsequent All-Ireland final. The stakes were high as Cork were attempting to capture another three set championship titles since 1954. Cork were never really troubled over the course of the seventy minutes and a Barry-Murphy goal helped the team to a 1–15 to 2–8 victory over their age-old rivals. It was his third All-Ireland winners' medal.

In 1979 Cork were invincible in the provincial championship once again with Barry-Murphy winning a fifth successive Munster title following a 2–15 to 0–9 defeat of Limerick. Cork's quest for a record-equalling four-in-a-row came to an end with a defeat by Galway in the All-Ireland semi-final.

Cork lost their provincial crown in 1980, however, Barry-Murphy continued with his winning ways by capturing a National Hurling League winners' medal. He won a second National Hurling League title in 1981, however, Cork were defeated in the provincial championship once again.

In 1982 Cork were back and Barry-Murphy, who was now captain of the team, won his sixth Munster winners' medal following a 5–31 to 3–6 trouncing of Waterford. The subsequent All-Ireland final saw Cork take on Kilkenny and in spite of being underdogs Kilkenny won courtesy of two Christy Heffernan goals in a forty-second spell.

In 1983 Cork's run of provincial success continued. Barry-Murphy won a seventh Munster winners' medal before leading his team in a second All-Ireland final against Kilkenny. Kilkenny dominated the opening half while Cork came storming back with goals by Tomás Mulcahy and Seánie O'Leary. 'The Cats' eventually won by two points.

1984 was a special year in the annals of Gaelic games as it was the centenary year of the Gaelic Athletic Association. The year began well with Barry-Murphy helping his team to victory in the special Centenary Cup competition. An eight Munster winners' medal soon followed for him as Cork defeated Tipperary by 4–15 to 3–14 in a memorable Munster final. The subsequent All-Ireland final, played at Semple Stadium in Thurles, saw Cork take on Offaly for the first time ever in championship history. The centenary-year final failed to live up to expectations and Cork recorded a relatively easy 3–16 to 1–12 victory with Barry-Murphy winning his fourth All-Ireland winners' medal.

Barry-Murphy added a ninth Munster winners' medal to his collection in 1985, however, Galway shocked Cork once again in an All-Ireland semi-final.

By 1986 Barry-Murphy was entering the twilight of his career. That year a defeat of Clare by Cork made it five-in-a-row in Munster, with Barry-Murphy collecting a tenth provincial winners' medal. An All-Ireland final against Galway with the men from the west being regarded as the red-hot favourites against an ageing Cork team, however, on the day a different story unfolded. Four Cork goals, one from John Fenton, two from Tomás Mulcahy and one from Kevin Hennessy, stymied the Galway attack and helped 'the Rebels' to a 4–13 to 2–15 victory. It was Barry-Murphy's fifth and final All-Ireland winners' medal.

On 2 April 1987, Barry-Murphy announced his retirement from inter-county hurling. The announcement, edged in black, was spread across page one of the national newspapers in a style more familiar to the death of world leaders. The first modern Gaelic games superstar had finally retired.

== Inter-provincial career ==
Barry-Murphy was a regular with the Munster inter-provincial football team between 1974 and 1979. After losing out at the semi-final stage in his debut year, he went on to win four Railway Cup winners' medals in-a-row over the next four seasons. The quest for a fifth successive title ended with a defeat in the final.

After leaving the inter-provincial football team Barry-Murphy was picked for three successive seasons as a member of the inter-provincial hurling team. He won a Railway Cup winners' medal in that code in his final year on the team in 1981.

== Association football ==
Barry-Murphy played association football with his local club, Wilton. He also lined out with Cork Celtic, the losing FAI Cup finalists of 1969, and had a successful few months. Barry-Murphy is a Celtic supporter.

His son Brian is now the manager of Cardiff City AFC

== Managerial career ==
Jimmy Barry-Murphy
Sport
Inter-county management
- Years: Team
- 1995–2000 2011–2015: Cork (H); Cork (H)
Inter-county titles as manager
County	League	Province	All-Ireland
Cork (H)	1	3	3

In retirement from inter-county activity Barry-Murphy became a popular analyst on The Sunday Game in the late 1980s and early 1990s. In the mid-1990s he took charge of the Cork minor hurling team. Barry-Murphy oversaw an upturn in success for the county in this grade. In his first year in charge in 1994 he guided the county to a Munster title, however, his side were later defeated by Galway in the All-Ireland final. In 1995 Barry-Murphy's side retained their Munster title. The subsequent championship decider saw Cork take on old rivals Kilkenny. On this occasion the All-Ireland title went to Barry-Murphy's team.

=== Cork ===
Barry-Murphy's success at minor level led him to being appointed manager of the Cork senior team in late 1995. The appointment of Tom Cashman and Johnny Crowley as selectors led to the managerial team being referred to as the 'dream team.' Barry-Murphy's tenure in charge of his county's senior team got off to a less than successful start. In their opening game of the Munster Championship Cork were defeated by Limerick at Páirc Uí Chaoimh. Even more humiliating was that it was the first time in 75 years that Cork had been beaten at home in the championship. Things improved slightly in 1997. In the Munster semi-final Cork were trailing Clare by a single point and looked capable of winning or at least securing a draw. With just a few second remaining Clare scored a goal and ended Cork's championship hopes for another year.

In 1998, the defeats of the previous two seasons put Barry-Murphy and his selectors under pressure to deliver. A successful National Hurling League campaign saw Cork reach the final of that competition and defeat Waterford in the final. This success meant that the team went into the championship with great expectations. In their opening game of the championship Cork beat Limerick in the Gaelic Grounds. With this win Cork turned the tables on Limerick for the 1996 debacle. It was also Cork's first championship win over a team that wasn't Down or Kerry since the 1992 Munster final when Cork also beat Limerick. However the Munster semi-final saw Clare defeat Cork on a score line of 0–21 to 0–13. For the sixth year in-a-row Cork had failed to make it to the All-Ireland series. Nonetheless with a League title in the bag and Cork also achieving a minor and u21 all Ireland double, there was promising signs that a breakthrough at senior level was imminent.

1999 was make-or-break year for Barry-Murphy. He introduced a host of new players and one of the youngest Cork teams ever took to the field in the championship against a Waterford team that reached an all Ireland semi final the previous year. Despite Waterford being favourites Cork passed the test with flying colours and comfortably beat the Deise men by six points in the end. The Munster final saw Cork take on Clare, a team that had defeated Cork in their previous four championship games 1993, 1995, 1997 and 1998. Cork's most recent champions win over Clare was in 1988. Clare entered the game as the red-hot favourites and as possible All-Ireland contenders, however, a younger Cork team finally triumphed and Barry-Murphy finally led his team to a first senior Munster title since 1992. Cork defeated reigning All-Ireland champions Offaly by three points in the All-Ireland semi-final before reaching the championship decider with Kilkenny. The game, played in atrocious conditions, proved to be an anti-climax. Cork were victorious by a single point and Barry-Murphy had finally led his county back to the All-Ireland title Cork's first since 1990.

In 2000 Barry-Murphy's Cork comfortably overcame a spirited challenge from Limerick in their opening championship game. Cork retained their Munster title when they beat Tipperary in a thrilling Munster final. In spite of Tipperary scoring three goals Cork outscored Tipp by 0–23 to 3–12. Once again, the experts predicted a Cork-Kilkenny final. However Offaly were waiting in the All-Ireland semi-final and in a defiant last stand from that great Offaly team, they duly defeated Cork gaining sweet revenge for their defeat to the same county the previous year at the same stage. This was Barry-Murphy's last game in charge as he resigned as manager shortly afterwards.

On 6 September 2011, Barry-Murphy was re-appointed as Cork senior hurling team manager with a contract until the end of the 2014 campaign. In 2012 Barry Murphy led Cork to a National Hurling League Final appearance where Cork were beaten by Kilkenny. In the Championship Cork lost to Tipperary in Munster, but beat Offaly and Wexford in the qualifiers, Waterford in a Quarter Final before eventually losing to Galway in the All Ireland Semi Finals.

In 2013 Barry Murphy led Cork to a Munster Final appearance with Cork losing to Limerick. Cork went on to beat Kilkenny and Dublin to reach the All Ireland Final. Cork were seconds away from a remarkable all Ireland triumph however Clare scored a late point to force a replay, with Cork eventually losing out to Clare in the replay.

Cork won their first Munster hurling title since 2006 in 2014 beating Limerick but lost out to Tipperary in the All-Ireland Semi-final. In October 2014, it was confirmed that Barry-Murphy would be staying on until the end of the 2016 season.

In 2015 Cork reached another National League Final under Barry Murphy losing to Waterford. In the Munster Championship Cork also lost to Waterford before beating Wexford and Clare to reach an all Ireland Quarter Final where Cork were comfortably beaten by Galway. In August 2015, Barry-Murphy announced that he had stepped down as manager of the Cork senior hurling team. Tributes flowed in from GAA figures in Cork and nationwide. His four seasons in charge had seen Cork win one Munster title, reach two Allianz Hurling League Finals, two All Ireland Semi-Finals and the 2013 All Ireland Hurling Final.

== Personal life ==
He worked as a director for Southern Business Finance, where his colleagues included All-Ireland winners Dinny Allen and Brian Murphy.

Barry-Murphy was married to Jean Kennefick, daughter of All-Ireland-winning captain Mick Kennefick, and they had four children – Brian, Deirdre, Ann and Orla. Brian became a successful athlete in his own right, forging a long soccer career in England's lower leagues before continuing to follow in his father's footsteps as a coach, first with Manchester City's youth teams and since 2025 as head coach at Cardiff City.

Apart from Gaelic games he had a major interest in greyhound racing and was a director of Cork Greyhound Stadium. In May 2021 he received a Hall of Fame award for services to greyhound racing.

== Honours ==
=== Club ===
St Finbarr's

- All-Ireland Senior Club Hurling Championship (2): 1974-75, 1977-78
- All-Ireland Senior Club Football Championship (2): 1978–79, 1979–80
- Munster Senior Club Hurling Championship (3): 1974, 1977, 1980
- Munster Senior Club Football Championship (2): 1979, 1980
- Cork Senior Club Hurling Championship (6)
- Cork Senior Club Football Championship (5)

=== Inter-county ===
Cork (senior)

- All-Ireland Senior Hurling Championship (5): 1976, 1977, 1978, 1984, 1986
- All-Ireland Senior Football Championship (1): 1973
- Munster Senior Hurling Championship (10): 1975, 1976, 1977, 1978, 1979, 1982 (c), 1983 (c), 1984, 1985, 1986
- Munster Senior Football Championship (2): 1973, 1974
- National Hurling League (2): 1979–80, 1980–81
- National Football League (1): 1979–80

Cork (under-21)

- All-Ireland Under-21 Hurling Championship (1): 1973
- Munster Under-21 Hurling Championship (2): 1973, 1975
- Munster Under-21 Football Championship (2): 1974 (c)

Cork (minor)

- All-Ireland Minor Hurling Championship (1): 1971
- All-Ireland Minor Football Championship (1): 1972
- Munster Minor Hurling Championship (2): 1971, 1972
- Munster Minor Football Championship (2): 1971, 1972

=== Inter-provincial ===
Munster (hurling)

- Railway Cup (1): 1981

Munster (football)

- Railway Cup (1): 1975, 1976, 1977, 1978

Other awards

- GAA All-Star Awards: football 2, hurling 5
- GAA Hall of Fame Inductee: 2015

Sporting positions
Preceded by Dinny Allen	Cork Senior Football Captain; 1977	Succeeded by Brian Murphy
Preceded by Dónal O'Grady	Cork Senior Hurling Captain; 1982–1983	Succeeded by John Fenton
Preceded by Johnny Clifford	Cork Senior Hurling Manager; 1995–2000	Succeeded by Tom Cashman
Preceded by Denis Walsh	Cork Senior Hurling Manager; 2011–2015	Succeeded by Kieran Kingston
Achievements
Preceded by Michael Bond (Offaly)	All-Ireland SHC winning manager 1999	Succeeded by Brian Cody (Kilkenny)
