= Mick McCarthy (Na Piarsaigh hurler) =

Irish hurler (1949–2024)

Personal information
- Native name: Mícheál Mac Cárthaigh (Irish)
- Nickname: Haulie
- Born: 1949 Cork, Ireland
- Died: 7 August 2024 (aged 75) Clonmel, County Tipperary, Ireland
- Occupation: Engineer

Sport
- Sport: Hurling
- Position: Left corner-forward
Clubs
- Years: Club
- 1968–1985 1969–1972: Na Piarsaigh → University College Cork
Club titles
- Cork titles: 1
College
- Years: College
- 1967–1972: University College Cork
College titles
- Fitzgibbon titles: 2
Inter-county
Years	County	Apps (scores)
1971	Cork	0 (0-00)
Inter-county titles
- Munster titles: 0
- All-Irelands: 0
- NHL: 0
- All Stars: 0

Michael McCarthy (1949 – 7 August 2024) was an Irish hurler. At club level he played with Na Piarsaigh and University College Cork, and at various inter-county levels with Cork.

== Career ==
McCarthy first played hurling as a student at the North Monastery in Cork. He lined out in various competitions, including the Harty Cup. McCarthy began his club hurling career with Na Piarsaigh, before later lining out with University College Cork. He captained "college" to the Cork SHC title in 1970, before winning consecutive Fitzgibbon Cup medals.

McCarthy first appeared on the inter-county scene with Cork as a member of the minor team that beat Wexford in the 1967 All-Ireland minor final. He immediately progressed to the under-21 team and won three successive All-Ireland U20HC medals after a defeat of Kilkenny in 1968 and back-to-back defeats of Wexford. McCarthy captained Cork for the second of those three victories.

As a result of his performances for UCC, McCarthy was drafted onto the Cork senior hurling team midway during the 1970–71 National League.

== Death ==
McCarthy died on 7 August 2024, at the age of 75.

== Honours ==
University College Cork

- Fitzgibbon Cup: 1971, 1972
- Cork Senior Hurling Championship: 1970 (c)

Cork

- All-Ireland Under-21 Hurling Championship: 1968, 1969 (c), 1970
- Munster Under-21 Hurling Championship: 1968, 1969 (c), 1970
- All-Ireland Minor Hurling Championship: 1967
- Munster Minor Hurling Championship: 1967

Sporting positions
Preceded by Pat Hegarty	Cork under-21 hurling team captain 1969	Succeeded by Teddy O'Brien
Achievements
Preceded by Pat Hegarty	All-Ireland Under-21 Hurling Final winning captain 1970	Succeeded by Teddy O'Brien
