= 1979 All-Ireland Senior Hurling Championship =

Championship details
- Dates: 27 May – 2 September 1979
- Teams: 11

All-Ireland champions
- Winning team: Kilkenny (21st win)
- Captain: Ger Fennelly
- Manager: Pat Henderson; Eddie Keher

All-Ireland Finalists
- Losing team: Galway
- Captain: Joe McDonagh
- Manager: Michael "Babs" Keating

Provincial champions
- Munster: Cork
- Leinster: Kilkenny
- Ulster: Not Played
- Connacht: Not Played

Championship statistics
- No. matches played: 10
- Goals total: 43 (4.3 per game)
- Points total: 271 (27.1 per game)
- Top Scorer: Éamonn Cregan (2–17)
- Player of the Year: Ger Henderson
- All-Star Team: See here

The 1979 All-Ireland Senior Hurling Championship was the 93rd staging of the All-Ireland hurling championship since its establishment by the Gaelic Athletic Association in 1887. The championship began on 27 May 1979 and ended on 2 September 1978.

Cork entered the championship as defending champions, however, they were beaten by Galway in the All-Ireland semi-final. Kilkenny won the title after defeating Galway by 2–12 to 1–8 in the final.

== Teams ==
A total of eleven teams contested the championship, one of the fewest participants in years. Only four team contested the Leinster series of games. Kildare, Laois and Westmeath withdrew from the provincial campaign, however, Laois did qualify for the All-Ireland series by winning the All-Ireland Senior B Hurling Championship. They did this at Antrim's expense. Kerry withdrew from the Munster championship.

=== Team summaries ===
Team	Colours	Most recent success		
Team	Colours	All-Ireland	Provincial	League
Clare	Saffron and blue	1914	1932	1977–78
Cork	Red and white	1978	1978	1973–74
Dublin	Navy and blue	1938	1961	1938–39
Galway	Maroon and white	1923	1922	1974–75
Kilkenny	Black and amber	1975	1978	1975–76
Laois	Blue and white	1915	1949	
Limerick	Green and white	1973	1974	1970–71
Offaly	Green, white and gold			
Tipperary	Blue and gold	1971	1971	1978–79
Waterford	Blue and white	1959	1963	1962–63
Wexford	Purple and gold	1968	1977	1972–73

== Provincial championships ==
=== Leinster Senior Hurling championship ===
24 June Semi-final	Kilkenny	4–15 – 4–11	Dublin	Geraldine Park
	M Crotty (2–1), M Brennan (1–3), M Ruth (1–1), B Fitzpatrick (0–3), L O'Brien (0–3), J Hennessy (0–2), K Fennelly (0–2).		M Holden (2–3), B Barry (1–2), J Cunningham (1–2), G Hayes (0–2), E Davy (0–1), J Towell (0–1).	Referee: G Kirwan (Offaly)

24 June Semi-final	Wexford	0–17 – 2–10	Offaly	Geraldine Park
	N Buggy (0–10), M Casey (0–2), S Kinsella (0–2), C Keogh (0–1), M Quigley (0–1), M Jacob (0–1).		P Carroll (0–4), J Flaherty (1–0), P Horan (1–0), P Kirwan (0–3), P Delaney (0–1), J Kelly (0–1), B Bermingham (0–1).	Referee: N O'Donoghue (Dublin)

15 July Final	Kilkenny	2–21 – 2–17	Wexford	Croke Park
	M Brennan (0–8), M Ruth (1–4), B Fitzpatrick (1–0), M Crotty (0–3), L O'Brien (0–2), J Hennessy (0–2), G Henderson (0–1), G Fennelly (0–1).		N Buggy (1–6), T Doran (1–1), S Kinsella (0–4), M Casey (0–3), C Keogh (0–1), D Rowesome (0–1), M Quigley (0–1).	Attendance: 24,991; Referee: G Kirwan (Offaly)

=== Munster Senior Hurling championship ===
27 May Quarter-final	Limerick	5–11 – 2–11	Waterford	Páirc Uí Chaoimh
	E Cregan (2–4), J McKenna (2–1), G Moloney (1–0), P Kelly (0–3), O O'Connor (0–2), P Fitzmaurice (0–1).		P McGrath (1–3), M Ormond (1–3), M Walsh (0–3), M Whelan (0–1), J Greene (0–1).	Referee: F Murphy (Cork)

3 June Semi-final	Cork	1–14 – 2–10	Tipperary	Páirc Uí Chaoimh
	C McCarthy (0–5), J Barry-Murphy (1–0), J Fenton (0–3), P Moylan (0–3), J Horgan (0–2), R Cummins (0–1).		P O'Neill (1–2), M Doyle (1–0), N O'Dwyer (0–3), F Loughnane (0–3), G Stapleton (0–1), E O'Shea (0–1).	Attendance: 40,690; Referee: N Dalton (Waterford)

10 June Semi-final	Limerick	3–19 – 4–12	Clare	Semple Stadium
	J McKenna (2–4), E Cregan (0–8), O O'Connor (1–3), B Carroll (0–2), P Fitzmaurice (0–1), P Kelly (0–1).		E O'Connor (2–0), M Moroney (0–5), P O'Connor (1–0), N Casey (1–0), C Honan (0–3), J Callinan (0–2), M Meehan (0–1), S Stack (0–1).	Attendance: 20,791; Referee: F Murphy

8 July Final	Cork	2–14 – 0–9	Limerick	Semple Stadium
	C McCarthy (1–4), R Cummins (1–2), J Fenton (0–3), T Cashman (0–2), T Crowley (0–1), J Barry-Murphy (0–1), G McCarthy (0–1).		E Cregan (0–5), S Foley (0–1), L Enright (0–1), P Kelly (0–1), O O'Connor (0–1).	Attendance: 47,849; Referee: G Ryan (Tipperary)

== All-Ireland Senior Hurling Championship ==
Quarter-finals		Semi-finals		Final
Galway	1–23
Laois	3–10	Cork	1–13
		Galway	2–14
				Galway	1–08
				Kilkenny	2–12

=== All-Ireland quarter-finals ===
1 July Quarter-final	Galway	1–23 – 3–10	Laois	St. Brendan's Park
	PJ Molloy (1–6), N McInerney (0–5), John Connolly (0–3), F Burke (0–3), I Clarke (0–2), S Mahon (0–2), Joe Connolly (0–1), B Forde (0–1).		M Brophy (1–2), C Jones (1–0), J Mahon (1–0), F Feenan (0–3), Mick Cuddy (0–2), B Bohane (0–1), A Lanham (0–1).	Referee: N O'Donoghue (Dublin)

=== All-Ireland semi-finals ===
5 August Semi-final	Galway	2–14 – 1–13	Cork	Croke Park
	John Connolly (0–5), N Lane (1–1), F Gantley (1–0), PJ Molloy (0–3), B Forde (0–3), F Burke (0–1), S Mahon (0–1).		R Cummins (1–0), C McCarthy (0–3), J Horgan (0–3), P Moylan (0–3), J Fenton (0–1), G McCarthy (0–1), T Crowley (0–1), S O'Leary (0–1).	Attendance: 12,315; Referee: J Rankins (Laois)

=== All-Ireland Final ===
2 September Final	Kilkenny	2–12 – 1–8	Galway	Croke Park
	L O'Brien (1–7), M Brennan (1–1), M Crotty (0–1), K Fennelly (0–1), J Hennessy (0–1), B Fitzpatrick (0–1).		N Lane (1–0), PJ Molloy (0–3), F Gantley (0–2), Joe Connolly (0–2), S Mahon (0–1).	Attendance: 53,535; Referee: G Ryan (Tipperary)

== Championship statistics ==
=== Miscellaneous ===
- Cork capture a record-equalling fifth successive Munster title following a victory over Limerick. It is the second time that Cork have achieved the five-in-a-row, the first since 1905.
- In the All-Ireland semi-final, Galway defeat Cork for only the second time in the history of the championship. It is Cork's first defeat since the All-Ireland semi-final of 1975 when the same opposition recorded their first win over 'the Rebels'.

== Top scorers ==
=== Season ===
Rank	Player	County	Tally	Total	Matches	Average
1	Éamonn Cregan	Limerick	2–17	23	3	7.66
2	Ned Buggy	Wexford	1–16	19	2	9.50
3	Mick Brennan	Kilkenny	2–12	18	3	6.00
4	Joe McKenna	Limerick	4–5	17	3	5.66
5	Charlie McCarthy	Cork	1–12	15	3	5.00
5	Liam O'Brien	Kilkenny	1–12	15	3	5.00
5	P. J. Molloy	Galway	1–12	15	3	5.00
8	Mick Crotty	Kilkenny	2–5	11	3	3.66
8	Matt Ruth	Kilkenny	2–5	11	3	3.66
10	Mick Holden	Dublin	2–3	9	1	9.00
10	Ray Cummins	Cork	2–3	9	3	3.00

=== Single game ===
Rank	Player	County	Tally	Total	Opposition
1	Éamonn Moroney	Clare	2–4	10	Waterford
1	Joe McKenna	Clare	2–4	10	Kilkenny
1	Liam 'Chunky' O'Brien	Clare	1–7	10	Kilkenny
1	Ned Buggy	Wexford	0–10	10	Offaly
5	Mick Holden	Dublin	2–3	9	Kilkenny
5	P. J. Molloy	Galway	1–6	9	Cork
5	Ned Buggy	Wexford	1–6	9	Kilkenny
8	Éamonn Cregan	Limerick	0–8	8	Clare
8	Mick 'Cloney' Brennan	Kilkenny	0–8	8	Wexford
10	Mick Crotty	Kilkenny	1–4	7	Dublin
10	Joe McKenna	Limerick	1–4	7	Waterford
10	Matt Ruth	Kilkenny	1–4	7	Wexford
10	Charlie McCarthy	Cork	1–4	7	Limerick

== Broadcasting ==
The following matches were broadcast live on television in Ireland on RTÉ.

Round	RTÉ
All-Ireland semi-final	Cork vs Galway
All-Ireland final	Kilkenny vs Galway

== Sources ==
- Corry, Eoghan, The GAA Book of Lists (Hodder Headline Ireland, 2005).
- Donegan, Des, The Complete Handbook of Gaelic Games (DBA Publications Limited, 2005).
