= Matthew Ruth =

Irish hurler

Personal information
- Native name: Maithiú de Rút (Irish)
- Born: 21 February 1987 (age 39) Kilkenny, Ireland
- Occupation: Secondary school teacher
- Height: 6 ft 0 in (183 cm)

Sport
- Sport: Hurling
- Position: Centre-forward
Club
- Years: Club
- 2004-present: James Stephens
Club titles
- Leinster titles: 3
- All-Ireland Titles: 2
College
- Years: College
- 1
Inter-county*
| Years | County | Apps (scores) |
| 2011-present | Kilkenny | 11 (0-2) |
Inter-county titles
- Leinster titles: 1
- All-Irelands: 0
- NHL: 1
- All Stars: 0
- *Inter County team apps and scores correct as of 17:38, 29 December 2014.

Matthew Ruth (born 21 February 1987) is an Irish hurler who currently plays as a substitute centre-forward for the Kilkenny senior team.

Ruth made his first appearance for the team during the 2011 National League, however, he remained as a substitute for the subsequent championship. Since then he has won an All-Ireland medal as a non-playing substitute and Leinster and National League medals on the field of play.

At club level, Ruth is a Leinster medalist with the James Stephens club.

His father, Matt Ruth, played hurling for Limerick and Kilkenny, winning two All-Ireland medals.

== Playing career ==
=== Club ===
Ruth plays his club hurling with the James Stephens club in Kilkenny and has enjoyed some success.

After developing his hurling at juvenile levels Ruth was drafted into the club's senior team as a seventeen-year-old in 2004. He was a non-playing substitute for James Stephens's county, Leinster and All-Ireland victories.

By 2005 Ruth had become a regular on the club's senior team. He missed the county final victory over Ballyhale Shamrocks because he was playing for the club's minor team in the opening game on county final day. The minors lost that game by two points. Ruth subsequently returned to the senior team, winning a Leinster club title following a 2–13 to 1–12 defeat of UCD.

Ruth appeared in two more county finals in 2008 and 2009, however, James Stephens were defeated by Ballyhale Shamrocks on both occasions.

=== Wrestling ===
In 2015 Matt attended the WWE NXT trials in the UK after being scouted by Lord Steven Regal. Although initial interest was shown by WWE, he was ultimately not signed having failed promo class.

In 2022 Matt tweeted that although his wrestling days were behind him, he would continue to offer his services to the younger generation should they be required.

=== Inter-county ===
Ruth first came to prominence on the inter-county scene as captain of the Kilkenny minor hurling team in 2004. That year he won a Leinster title following a 1–15 to 1–04 defeat of Dublin. Ruth's side were later defeated by Galway in an All-Ireland final replay.

Kilkenny failed to retain their provincial title in 2005 and Ruth's minor hurling career came to a close.

Ruth did not make it onto the Kilkenny under-21 team straight away, however, by 2008 he was a key member of the team in 2008. That year he won a Leinster title following a 2–21 to 2–10 defeat of Offaly. Ruth later added an All-Ireland medal to his collection following a 2–13 to 0–15 defeat of Tipperary.

In 2011 Ruth made his senior debut for Kilkenny in the pre-season Walsh Cup tournament. He later lined out in various group stage games of the National Hurling League and started in the league final defeat by Dublin. Ruth subsequently made his championship debut when he came on as a substitute in the Leinster final defeat of Dublin. It was his first Leinster winners' medal.
