= 1978 All-Ireland Senior Hurling Championship =

Championship details
- Dates: 30 April – 3 September 1978
- Teams: 15

All-Ireland champions
- Winning team: Cork (24th win)
- Captain: Charlie McCarthy
- Manager: Fr. Bertie Troy

All-Ireland Finalists
- Losing team: Kilkenny
- Captain: Ger Henderson
- Manager: Fr. Tommy Maher

Provincial champions
- Munster: Cork
- Leinster: Kilkenny
- Ulster: Not Played
- Connacht: Not Played

Championship statistics
- No. matches played: 14
- Goals total: 64 (4.5 per game)
- Points total: 340 (24.2 per game)
- Top Scorer: Liam O'Brien (1–23)
- Player of the Year: John Horgan
- All-Star Team: See here

The 1978 All-Ireland Senior Hurling Championship was the 92nd staging of the All-Ireland hurling championship since its establishment by the Gaelic Athletic Association in 1887. The championship began on 30 April 1978 and ended on 3 September 1978.

Cork entered the championship as defending champions.

On 3 September 1978, Cork won the championship following a 1–15 to 2–8 defeat of Kilkenny in the All-Ireland final. This was their 24th All-Ireland title, their third championship in succession.

Kilkenny's Liam "Chunky" O'Brien was the championship's top scorer with 1–23. Cork's John Horgan was the choice for Hurler of the Year.

== Team summaries ==
Team	Colours	Most recent success		
Team	Colours	All-Ireland	Provincial	League
Antrim	Saffron and white		1946	
Clare	Saffron and blue	1914	1932	1977–78
Cork	Red and white	1977	1977	1973–74
Dublin	Navy and blue	1938	1961	1938–39
Galway	Maroon and white	1923	1922	1974–75
Kerry	Green and gold	1891	1891	
Kildare	White			
Kilkenny	Black and amber	1975	1975	1975–76
Laois	Blue and white	1915	1915	
Limerick	Green and white	1973	1974	1970–71
Offaly	Green, white and gold			
Tipperary	Blue and gold	1971	1971	1967–68
Waterford	Blue and white	1959	1963	1962–63
Westmeath	Maroon and white			
Wexford	Purple and gold	1968	1977	1972–73

== Provincial championships ==
=== Leinster Senior Hurling Championship ===
First round

30 April 1978 First round	Laois	2–8 – 2–7	Westmeath	O'Connor Park
	F Keenan 0–4, J Mahon 1–0, M Bolger 1–0, M Cuddy 0–3, M Walsh 0–2.		M Ryan 2–1, D McCormack 0–3, J Kilcoyne 0–2, G Whelan 0–1.	Referee: O Moylan (Offaly)

Quarter-final

4 June 1978 Quarter-final	Laois	2–10 – 2–13	Dublin	O'Connor Park
	P Keenan 1–7, M Cuddy 1–0, P Kelly 0–1, L Shaughnessy 0–1, P Dunphy 0–1.		L Hennebry 1–3, D Itbeinlarh 1–0, V Holden 0–4, M Holden 0–4, S Cullen 0–1, J Towell 0–1.	Referee: G Kirwan (Offaly)

11 June 1978 Quarter-final	Offaly	3–19 – 2–10	Kildare	O'Moore Park

Semi-finals

18 June 1978 Semi-final	Dublin	4–13 – 5–16	Wexford	Dr. Cullen Park
	J Towell 2–0, V Holden 1–3, M Holden 1–3, L Hennebry 0–4, T Quinn 0–1, P Carton 0–1, D Murphy 0–1.		S Kinsella 3–1, N Buggy 0–8, C Keogh 1–0, M Quigley 1–0, J Quigley 0–2, M Butler 0–2, T Doran 0–1, C Doran 0–1, M Casey 0–1.	Referee: J Murphy (Kilkenny)

25 June 1978 Semi-final	Kilkenny	2–17 – 1–4	Offaly	O'Moore Park
	L O'Brien 0–11, B Cody 1–3, M Malone 1–0, B Fitzpatrick 0–2, M Brennan 0–2.		P Horgan 1–0, K Mooney 0–2, P Delaney 0–1, B Bermingham 0–1.	Referee: J Rankins (Laois)

Final

16 July 1978 Final	Kilkenny	2–16 – 1–16	Wexford	Croke Park
	M Ruth 1–3, B Fitzpatrick 1–2, L O'Brien 0–5, M Brennan 0–4, B Cody 0–1, F Cummins 0–1.		N Buggy 1–7, J Murphy 0–4, M Quigley 0–2, S Kinsella 0–1, D Bernie 0–1, R Kinsella 0–1.	Referee: J Rankins (Laois)

=== Munster Senior Hurling Championship ===
Quarter-finals

4 June 1978 Quarter-final	Waterford	5–13 – 0–11	Kerry	Fraher Field
	M Walsh 0–7, P Kelly 2–0, J Greene 1–2, M Hickey 1–1, J Galvin 1–1, P McGrath 0–1, M Whelan 0–1.		P Moriarty 0–5, C Nolan 0–3, J O'Grady 0–1, J Hourihane 0–1, J McElligott 0–1.	Referee: K Ryan (Tipperary)

11 June 1978 Quarter-final	Limerick	1–14 – 0–9	Tipperary	Páirc Uí Chaoimh
	L O'Donoghue 0–5, É Grimes 0–4, W Fitzmaurice 1–0, S Condon 0–2, F Nolan 0–1, S Foley 0–1.		T Butler 0–3, P O'Neill 0–2, S Burke 0–1, P Fanning 0–1, N O'Dwyer 0–1.	Referee: F Murphy (Cork)

Semi-finals

25 June 1978 Semi-final	Cork	3–17 – 2–8	Waterford	Semple Stadium
	J Barry-Murphy 1–3, T Cashman 1–2, R Cummins 1–1, S O'Leary 0–3, J Horgan 0–3, C McCarthy 0–2, G McCarthy 0–2, T Crowley 0–1.		J Greene 1–1, J Galvin 1–0, M Walsh 0–3, D Fitzpatrick 0–2, P Kelly 0–1, J Dalton 0–1.	Referee: J Moloney (Tipperary)

2 July 1978 Semi-final	Clare	4–12 – 3–8	Limerick	Semple Stadium
	C Honan 0–9, P O'Connor 1–1, B Gilligan 1–0, M McKeogh 1–0, S O'Connor 1–0, M Moroney 0–2.		W Fitzmaurice 3–0, É Grimes 0–4, S Foley 0–2, F Nolan 0–1, É Cregan 0–1.	Referee: J Moloney (Tipperary)

Final

30 July 1978 Final	Cork	0–13 – 0–11	Clare	Semple Stadium
	C McCarthy 0–5, J Horgan 0–4, R Cummins 0–2, T Cashman 0–1, T Crowley 0–1.		C Honan 0–6, E O'Connor 0–1, G Loughnane 0–1, M Moroney 0–1, J Callinan 0–1, N Casey 0–1.	Referee: J Moloney (Tipperary)

== All-Ireland Senior Hurling Championship ==
Quarter-finals		Semi-finals		Final
Galway	4–19
Antrim	3–10	Kilkenny	4–20
		Galway	4–13
				Kilkenny	2–08
				Cork	1–15

=== All-Ireland quarter-finals ===
23 July 1978 Quarter-final	Galway	4–19 – 3–10	Antrim	Croke Park
	Joe Connolly 3–1, M Connolly 0–5, F Burke 1–0, F Gantley 0–3, PJ Molloy 0–3, S Silke 0–3, John Connolly 0–2, M Barrett 0–1, I Clarke 0–1.		R McDonnell 3–1, J Fagan 0–4, S Boyle 0–2, J Crossey 0–1, D Donnelly 0–1, P Boyle 0–1.	Referee: C Foley (Dublin)

=== All-Ireland semi-finals ===
6 August 1978 Semi-final	Galway	4–13 – 4–20	Kilkenny	Croke Park
	PJ Molloy 1–3, N Lane 1–1, F Burke 1–0, John Connolly 1–0, F Gantley 0–3, M Connolly 0–2, I Clarke 0–2, Joe Connolly 0–2.		M Ruth 2–1, L O'Brien 1–3, B Cody 1–2, B Fitzpatrick 0–5, K Fennelly 0–3, M Crotty 0–2, F Cummins 0–2, J Hennessy 0–2.	Attendance: 16,299; Referee: J Moloney (Tipperary)

=== All-Ireland Final ===
3 September 1978 Final	Cork	1–15 – 2–8	Kilkenny	Croke Park
	C McCarthy 0–7, J Barry-Murphy 1–1, G McCarthy 0–2, T Crowley 0–2, R Cummins 0–1, S O'Leary 0–1, T Cashman 0–1.		B Fitzpatrick 1–1, L O'Brien 0–4, K Fennelly 1–0, M Brennan 0–2, J Hennessy 0–1.	Attendance: 64,155; Referee: J Rankin (Laois)

== Top scorers ==
Overall

Rank	Player	County	Tally	Total	Matches	Average
1	Liam O'Brien	Kilkenny	1–23	26	4	6.50
2	Ned Buggy	Wexford	1–15	18	2	9.00
3	Billy Fitzpatrick	Kilkenny	2–10	16	4	4.0
4	Colm Honan	Clare	0–15	15	2	7.50
5	Charlie McCarthy	Cork	0–14	14	3	4.66
6	Willie Fitzmaurice	Limerick	4–0	12	2	6.00
6	Joe Connolly	Galway	3–3	12	2	6.00
8	Seánie Kinsella	Wexford	3–2	11	2	5.50

Single game

Rank	Player	County	Tally	Total	Opposition
1	Liam O'Brien	Kilkenny	0–11	11	Offaly
2	Joe Connolly	Galway	3–1	10	Antrim
2	Randall McDonnell	Antrim	3–1	10	Galway
2	Seánie Kinsella	Wexford	3–1	10	Dublin
2	Ned Buggy	Wexford	1–7	10	Kilkenny
2	Frank Keenan	Laois	1–7	10	Dublin
7	Willie Fitzmaurice	Limerick	3–0	9	Clare
7	Colm Honan	Clare	0–9	9	Limerick
9	Ned Buggy	Wexford	0–8	8	Dublin
10	Mick Ryan	Westmeath	2–1	7	Laois
10	Matt Ruth	Kilkenny	2–1	7	Galway
10	Mossie Walsh	Waterford	0–7	7	Kerry
10	Charlie McCarthy	Cork	0–7	7	Kilkenny

== Championship statistics ==
=== Miscellaneous ===
- Cork retain the All-Ireland title for a third successive season. It is the fourth time in their history that they have achieved this feat and the first time since Cork in 1954 that a team has won three championships in succession.
- Kerry return to the Munster Senior Hurling Championship for the first time since 1958.

== Broadcasting ==
The following matches were broadcast live on television in Ireland on RTÉ.

Round	RTÉ
All-Ireland semi-final	Kilkenny vs Galway
All-Ireland final	Cork vs Kilkenny

== Sources ==
- Corry, Eoghan, The GAA Book of Lists (Hodder Headline Ireland, 2005).
- Donegan, Des, The Complete Handbook of Gaelic Games (DBA Publications Limited, 2005).
- Nolan, Pat, Flashbacks: A Half Century of Cork Hurling (The Collins Press, 2000).
