= 1976 All-Ireland Senior Hurling Championship final =

1976 All-Ireland Senior Hurling Final
- Event: 1976 All-Ireland Senior Hurling Championship
| Cork | Wexford |
| 2-21 | 4-11 |
- Date: 5 September 1976
- Venue: Croke Park, Dublin
- Referee: Paddy Johnson (Kilkenny)
- Attendance: 62,684

The 1976 All-Ireland Senior Hurling Championship Final was the 89th All-Ireland Final and the culmination of the 1976 All-Ireland Senior Hurling Championship, an inter-county hurling tournament for the top teams in Ireland. The match was held at Croke Park, Dublin, on 5 September 1976, between Cork and Wexford. The Leinster champions lost to their Munster opponents on a score line of 2-21 to 4-11.

== Match details ==
1976-09-05
15:15 UTC+1
Final

| Cork | 2-21 – 4-11 | Wexford |

Croke Park, Dublin
Attendance: 62,684
Referee: P. Johnson (Kilkenny)

| Cork | Wexford |

Cork Team 1 Martin Coleman 2 Brian Murphy 3 Pat McDonnell, 4 Martin O'Doherty 5 Fr Pat Barry 6 Johnny Crowley 7 Denis Coughlan 8 Gerald McCarthy 9 Pat Moylan 10 Mick Malone 11 Brendan Cummins 12 Jimmy Barry Murphy 13 Charlie McCarthy 14 Ray Cummins 15 Seanie O'Leary Substitutes John Horgan for Fr Pat Barry Eamonn O'Donoghue for Seanie O'Leary Unused Substitutes Michael O'Connor, Denis Burns, Bertie Og Murphy, John Allen Coach Fr Bertie Troy Trainer Kevin Kehilly Selectors Frank Murphy, Jimmy Brohan, Christy Ring, Denis Murphy, Denis Hurley
