= 1970 All-Ireland Under-21 Hurling Championship =

All-Ireland Under-21 Hurling Championship 1970
Championship Details
- Dates: 19 April 1970 – 1 November 1970
- Teams: 15

All Ireland Champions
- Winners: Cork (4th win)
- Captain: Teddy O'Brien

All Ireland Runners-up
- Runners-up: Wexford
- Captain: Liam Bennett

Provincial Champions
- Munster: Cork
- Leinster: Wexford
- Ulster: Antrim
- Connacht: Not Played

Championship Statistics
- Matches Played: 15
- Top Scorer: Mick Butler (6-30)

The 1970 All-Ireland Under-21 Hurling Championship was the 7th staging of the All-Ireland Under-21 Hurling Championship since its establishment by the Gaelic Athletic Association in 1964.

Cork entered the championship as the defending champions.

On 1 November 1970, Cork won the championship following a 5-17 to 0-8 defeat of Wexford in a replay of the All-Ireland final. This was their 4th All-Ireland title in the grade and their third in succession.

Wexford's Mick Butler was the championship's top scorer with 6-30.

== Changes ==
In keeping with their senior and minor teams, Galway's under-21 hurlers left the Munster Championship where they had been playing since 1964. Having no competition in their own province, Galway received a bye to the All-Ireland semi-final stage.

== Results ==
=== Leinster Under-21 Hurling Championship ===
Quarter-finals

27 May 1970 Quarter-final	Westmeath	2-11 - 1-11	Offaly	Cusack Park, Mullingar
	G Whelan 1-3, J Nash 1-0, W Shanley 0-3, D O'Donnell 0-3, S Fagan 0-1, W Bray 0-1.		A Barry 0-5, D McIntyre 1-0, M Cleere 0-3, A Daly 0-2, M Delaney 0-1.

31 May 1970 Quarter-final	Kilkenny	5-04 - 1-13	Dublin	O'Toole Park, Dublin
	D Prendergast 2-3, M Brennan 1-1, L O'Brien 1-0, S Connery 1-0.		L Blood 0-5, T Deegan 1-1, PJ Holden 0-4, N Rooney 0-1, K Hegarty 0-1, R O'Shea 0-1.	Referee: J Rankins (Laois)

2 June 1970 Quarter-final	Laois	4-07 - 2-09	Kildare	O'Moore Park, Portlaoise
	T Duggan 2-2, K Farrell 1-1, L Duff 1-0, F Keenan 0-2, F Dates 0-1, J Downey 0-1.		J Connell 0-6, D Flanagan 1-0, J Goulding 1-0, R Hayden 0-1, J O'Brien 0-1, R Cullen 0-1.

Semi-finals

21 June 1970 Semi-final	Wexford	7-11 - 3-06	Laois	Nowlan Park, Kilkenny
	M Butler 3-2, C Doran 2-0, M Casey 1-2, T Byrne 1-2, E Murphy 0-4, T Cahill 0-1.		F Keenan 3-0, G Lanham 0-3, T Duggan 0-2, P Bates 0-1.

5 July 1970 Semi-final	Kilkenny	5-12 - 0-06	Westmeath	O'Connor Park, Tullamore
	L O'Brien 2-6, M Murphy 2-1, M Drennan 1-0, S Kearney 0-2, D Murphy 0-2, D Prendergast 0-1.		G Whelan 0-3, J Nash 0-1, W Bray 0-1, W Bradley 0-1.

Final

19 July 1970 Final	Wexford	2-15 - 5-04	Kilkenny	Dr. Cullen Park, Carlow
	M Butler 1-7, T White 1-0, C Doran 0-3, M Quigley 0-3, M Casey 0-1, T Byrne 0-1.		M Drennan 2-0, M Garrett 1-3, M Murphy 1-0, L O'Brien 1-0, M Brennan 0-1.	Referee: R Sheppard (Carlow)

=== Munster Under-21 Hurling Championship ===
First round

19 April 1970 First round	Waterford	4-05 - 4-12	Clare	Semple Stadium, Thurles
	M Hickey 2-1, T O'Connor 1-1, J Flynn 1-0, J Greene 0-2, C McCabe 0-1.		J McNamara 1-5, D Pyne 1-1, T Ryan 1-1, M O'Connor 1-1, M Moroney 0-4.	Referee: P Ryan (Tipperary)

Semi-finals

3 June 1970 Semi-final	Limerick	1-05 - 9-05	Tipperary	Gaelic Grounds, Limerick
	W Conway 1-1, S Foley 0-2, D O'Connor 0-1, F Nolan 0-1.		P Byrne 3-2, P O'Neill 3-0, J Tynan 2-0, T Delaney 1-3.	Referee: D Crowe (Clare)

8 July 1970 Semi-final	Cork	2-10 - 1-06	Clare	Gaelic Grounds, Limerick
	P Ring 1-2, B Cummins 1-1, K McSweeney 0-4, P Moylan 0-2, T Buckley 0-1.		J McNamara 0-4, S Durack 1-0, M Moroney 0-1, D Pyne 0-1.	Referee: S O'Connor (Limerick)

Final

29 July 1970 Final	Tipperary	2-07 - 3-11	Cork	Semple Stadium, Thurles
	T Delaney 2-4, P O'Neill 0-2, S Ryan 0-1.		P Ring 1-7, J Barrett 1-1, M Malone 1-0, J Horgan 0-1, P Nolan 0-1, J Nodwell 0-1.	Referee: J Dunphy (Waterford)

=== Ulster Under-21 Hurling Championship ===
Final

2 August 1970 Final	Antrim	6-12 - 2-10	Down	Casement Park, Belfast
	G McCann 2-1, A McCallin 2-1, M Brunty 1-3, C McAuley 1-0, A Hamill 0-3, E Dornan 0-1, S Collins 0-1, A Connolly 0-1, C McDonnell 0-1.		S McGrattan 0-6, T Acheson 1-1, G Lennon 1-0, M Coleman 0-1, P Conlon 0-1, J Hughes 0-1.

=== All-Ireland Under-21 Hurling Championship ===
Semi-finals

2 August 1970 Semi-final	Wexford	8-22 - 2-09	Galway	Wexford Park, Wexford
	B Murphy 3-2, M Casey 2-6, M Butler 1-7, M Quigley 1-3, V Flanagan 1-1, J Quigley 0-1, P O'Brien 0-1, T Byrne 0-1.		M Murphy 1-1, J Norris 0-4, E Donohue 1-0, M Deely 0-3, S Burke 0-1.

9 August 1970 Semi-final	Antrim	1-04 - 3-10	Cork	Casement Park, Belfast
	M Brunty 1-0, A McCallin 0-2, S Collins 0-1, A Hamill 0-1.		K McSweeney 1-2, J Barrett 1-1, T Buckley 1-0, D Collins 0-4, S Looney 0-2, P Moylan 0-1.

Finals

11 October 1970 Final	Cork	3-08 - 2-11	Wexford	Croke Park, Dublin
	P Ring 2-2, S O'Leary 1-0, C Kelly 0-2, K McSweeney 0-2, S Murphy 0-1, S Looney 0-1.		M Butler 1-10, M Quigley 1-0, L Bennett 0-1.	Referee: J Dunphy (Waterford)

1 November 1970 Final replay	Cork	5-17 - 0-08	Wexford	Croke Park, Dublin
	C Kelly 2-7, P Ring 0-7, J Barrett 1-1, B Cummins 1-0, S O'Leary 1-0, P Moylan 0-1, J Horgan 0-1.		M Butler 0-4, M Casey 0-2, L Bennett 0-1, M Quigley 0-1.	Referee: J Dunphy (Waterford)

== Championship statistics ==
=== Top scorers ===
Overall

Rank	Player	Club	Tally	Total	Matches	Average
1	Mick Butler	Wexford	6-30	48	5	9.60
2	Paddy Ring	Cork	4-18	30	4	7.50
3	Martin Casey	Wexford	3-11	20	5	4.00
4	Liam O'Brien	Kilkenny	4-06	18	3	6.00
5	Timmy Delaney	Tipperary	3-07	16	2	8.00
6	Connie Kelly	Cork	2-09	15	2	7.50
7	Martin Quigley	Wexford	2-07	13	5	2.60
8	Jimmy Barrett	Cork	3-03	12	4	3.00
8	Jim McNamara	Clare	1-09	12	2	6.00
10	Paul Byrne	Tipperary	3-02	11	2	5.50
10	Barry Murphy	Wexford	3-02	11	5	2.20
10	Kevin McSweeney	Cork	1-08	11	5	2.20

In a single game

Rank	Player	Club	Tally	Total	Opposition
1	Connie Kelly	Kilkenny	2-07	13	Wexford
1	Mick Butler	Wexford	1-10	13	Cork
3	Liam O'Brien	Kilkenny	2-06	12	Westmeath
3	Martin Casey	Wexford	2-06	12	Galway
5	Mick Butler	Wexford	3-02	11	Laois
5	Paul Byrne	Tipperary	3-02	11	Limerick
5	Barry Murphy	Wexford	3-02	11	Galway
8	Timmy Delaney	Tipperary	2-04	10	Cork
8	Mick Butler	Wexford	1-07	10	Kilkenny
8	Paddy Ring	Cork	1-07	10	Tipperary
8	Mick Butler	Wexford	1-07	10	Galway

=== Miscellaneous ===
- The All-Ireland semi-final between Wexford and Galway was their first ever championship meeting in this grade.
- Cork remained undefeated for a third successive championship.
