= Noel Casey =

Irish hurler

Noel Casey is a former Irish sportsman. He played hurling with the Clare senior team and won an All Star award in 1978, being picked in the centre forward position. He also won two National League titles in 1977 and 1978.

Noel Casey made his senior club debut at the age of 17. In 1968 he advanced to the Clare under-21 team, and was subsequently selected for the county senior panel.
