= Colm Honan =

Clare hurler

Personal information
- Native name: Colm Ó hEoghanáin (Irish)
- Born: 1954 (age 71–72) Clonlara, County Clare, Ireland

Sport
- Sport: Hurling
- Position: Midfield
Club
- Years: Club
- Clonlara
Club titles
- Clare titles: 0
Inter-county
Years	County	Apps (scores)
1974–1984	Clare	20 (3–73)
Inter-county titles
- Munster titles: 0
- All-Irelands: 0
- NHL: 2
- All Stars: 1

Colm Honan (born 1954) is an Irish former hurler who played as a midfielder for the Clare senior team.

Honan joined the team during the 1974 championship and became a regular player until his retirement at the end of the 1984 championship. During that time he won back-to-back National Hurling League winners' medals and an All-Star award. His son, Darach Honan, played for the Clare senior hurling team, before retiring in 2017.

At club level Honan had a lengthy career with Clonlara.
