= 1976 All-Ireland Senior Hurling Championship =

Championship details
- Dates: 2 May – 5 September 1976
- Teams: 13

All-Ireland champions
- Winning team: Cork (22nd win)
- Captain: Ray Cummins
- Manager: Bertie Troy

All-Ireland Finalists
- Losing team: Wexford
- Captain: Tony Doran
- Manager: Tom Neville

Provincial champions
- Munster: Cork
- Leinster: Wexford
- Ulster: Not Played
- Connacht: Not Played

Championship statistics
- No. matches played: 13
- Top Scorer: Mick Butler (3–20)
- Player of the Year: Tony Doran
- All-Star Team: See here

The 1976 All-Ireland Senior Hurling Championship was the 90th staging of the All-Ireland Senior Hurling Championship, the Gaelic Athletic Association's premier inter-county hurling tournament. The championship began on 2 May 1976 and ended on 5 September 1976.

Kilkenny were the defending champions but were defeated by Wexfoprd in the Leinster final.

On 5 September 1976, Cork won the championship following a 2–21 to 4–11 defeat of Wexford in the All-Ireland final at Croke Park. This was their 22nd All-Ireland title overall and their first title since 1970.

Wexford's Mick Butler was the championship's top scorer with 3–20. Wexford's Tony Doran was the choice for Hurler of the Year.

== Provincial championships ==
=== Leinster Senior Hurling Championship ===
May 2, 1976
First Round

Kildare	3–10 – 1–10	Dublin
M. Moore (2–0), B. Burke (0–4), J. Walsh (0–4), M. Deely (1–0), P. Dunny 0–1, Tommy Carew (0–1).		J. Towell (1–1), C. Henneberry (0–3), L. Walsh (0–2), L. Henneberry (0–1), D. Kavanagh (0–1), P. Reaney (0–1), E. Flynn (0–1).

Aughrim County Ground, Aughrim

June 6, 1976
First Round

Westmeath	1–14 – 1–11	Offaly
M. Cosgrave (0–10), P. Bradley (1–1), S. Allen (0–2), M. Fagan (0–1).		P. Delaney (0–5), D. Hanniffy (1–0), P. J. Whelehan (0–2), C. Loughnane (0–1), M. Cleere (0–1), P. Carroll (0–1), B. Moylan (0–1).

Croke Park, Dublin

June 13, 1976
Semi-Final

Kildare	2–15 – 2–19	Wexford
J. Walsh (0–12), N. Walshe (1–2), T. White (1–0), M. Moore (0–1), M. Deeley (0–1).		D. Rowesome 1–2), T. Doran (0–5), J. Quigley (0–5), N. Buggy (1–1), M. Butler (0–3), J. Murphy (0–2), C. Keogh (0–1).

Geraldine Park, Athy
Referee: J. Rankins (Laois)

July 4, 1976
Semi-Final

Westmeath	1–12 – 5–22	Kilkenny
J. Fitzsimons (1–0), M. Cosgrave (0–3), M. Kilcoyne (0–2), P. Bradley (0–2), P. Curran (0–2), P. Carley (0–1), S. Allen (0–1), G. Whelan (0–1).		P. Delaney (2–4), M. Ruth (1–6), E. Keher (1–4), B. Fitzpatrick (1–3), M. Brennan (0–2), L. O'Brien (0–2), M. Crotty (0–1).

Cusack Park, Mullingar
Referee: M. Spain (Offaly)

July 18, 1976
Final

Wexford	2–20 – 1–6	Kilkenny
M. Butler (0–8), J. Quigley (1–3), T. Doran (1–2), N. Buggy (0–4), M. Quigley (0–2), J. Murphy (0–1).		E. Keher (1–1), L. O'Brien (0–4), M. Ruth (0–1).

Croke Park, Dublin
Referee: J. Rankins (Laois)

=== Munster Senior Hurling Championship ===
June 6, 1976
First Round

Clare	3–15 – 3–12	Waterford
C. Honan (0–9), N. Casey (2–0), T. Crowe (1–0), J. Callinan (0–2), J. McNamara (0–2), E. O'Connor (0–1), S. Stack (0–1).		M. Whelan (1–4), M. Hickey (1–0), J. Greene (1–0), A. Reid (0–2), L. Canning (0–2), P. McGrath (0–2), S. Greene (0–1), J. Galvin (0–1).

Gaelic Grounds, Limerick
Referee: J. Moloney (Tipperary)

June 14, 1976
Semi-Final

Cork	4–10 – 2–15	Tipperary
J. Fenton (1–2), C. McCarthy (1–2), R. Cummins (1–1), S. O'Leary (1–1), J. Barry-Murphy (0–1), D. Coughlan (0–1), P. Moylan (0–1), M. Malone (0–1).		J. Grogan (1–8), T. Butler (1–3), T. Quigley (0–1), S. Power (0–1), S. Hogan (0–1), F. Loughnane (0–1).

Gaelic Grounds, Limerick
Referee: S. O'Grady (Limerick)

July 4, 1976
Semi-Final

Limerick	4–12 – 1–13	Clare
J. Neenan (1–6), E. Cregan (2–1), J. McKenna (1–1), S. Foley (0–2), G. Moloney (0–2).		C. Honan (1–4), M. Moroney (0–5), R. O'Connor (0–3).

Semple Stadium, Thurles
Referee: J. Moloney (Tipperary)

August 1, 1976
Final

Cork	3–15 – 4–5	Limerick
C. McCarthy (1–3), P. Moylan (1–2), N. Malone (0–5), J. Barry-Murphy (1–0), S. O'Leary (0–3), J. Allen (0–1), G. McCarthy (0–1).		E. Cregan (4–1), J. Neenan (0–1), J. McKenna (0–1), L. O'Donoghue (0–1), P. Kelly (0–1).

Páirc Uí Chaoimh, Cork
Referee: M. Slattery (Clare)

== All-Ireland Senior Hurling Championship ==
=== All-Ireland quarter-finals ===
July 18, 1976
Quarter-Final

Galway	3–12 – 3–9	Kerry
P. J. Molloy (1–6), J. Connolly (1–1), L. Bohan (1–0), J. Connolly (0–2), P. J. Qualter (0–1), S. Murphy (0–1), F. Spellman (0–1).		P. Moriarty (2–1), J. O'Sullivan (0–4), P. Bunyon (1–0), F. Donovan (0–1), T. Nolan (0–1), J. Fitzgerald (0–1), G. Scallard (0–1).

Gaelic Grounds,
Limerick

=== All-Ireland semi-finals ===
August 15, 1976
Semi-Final

Wexford	5–14 – 2–23	Galway
M. Butler (2–2), T. Doran (2–0), N. Buggy (1–2), J. Quigley (0–5), C. Keogh (0–3), J. Murphy (0–1), M. Quigley (0–1).		P. J. Qualter (2–1), S. Silke (0–4), Joe Connolly (0–4), P. Fahy (0–3), G. Coone (0–3), John Connolly (0–2), P. J. Molloy (0–2), F. Burke (0–2), M. Connolly (0–1), J. McDonagh (0–1).

Páirc Uí Chaoimh,
Cork
Attendance: 26,000
Referee: F. Murphy (Cork)

August 22, 1976
Semi-Final
Replay

Wexford	3–14 – 2–14	Galway
J. Quigley (1–3), T. Doran (1–2), N. Buggy (1–1), M. Butler (0–3), M. Quigley (0–3), C. Keogh (0–1), B. Rowesome (0–1).		P. J. Molloy (1–1), P. J. Qualter (1–0), John Connolly (0–3), Joe Connolly (0–2), S. Silke (0–2), I. Clarke (0–2), G. Coone (0–2), P. Fahy (0–1).

Páirc Uí Chaoimh,
Cork
Attendance: 16,482
Referee: M. Slattery (Clare)

=== All-Ireland final ===
September 5, 1976
Final

Cork	2–21 – 4–11	Wexford
P. Moylan (0–10), C. McCarthy (1–3), R. Cummins (1–2), J. Barry-Murphy (0–4), M. Malone (0–1), S. O’Leary (0–1).		M. Quigley (2–1), M. Butler (1–4), N. Buggy (0–5), T. Doran (1–0), J. Quigley (0–1).

Croke Park, Dublin
Attendance: 62,684

== Championship statistics ==
=== Top scorers ===
Overall

Rank	Player	County	Tally	Total	Matches	Average
1	Mick Butler	Wexford	3–20	29	5	5.80
2	Tony Doran	Wexford	5-09	24	5	4.80
3	John Quigley	Wexford	2–17	23	5	4.60
4	Ned Buggy	Wexford	3–13	22	5	4.40
5	Éamonn Cregan	Limerick	6-02	20	2	10.00
6	Charlie McCarthy	Cork	3-08	17	3	5.66
7	Colm Honan	Clare	1–13	16	2	8.00
7	Pat Moylan	Cork	1–13	16	3	5.33
7	Johnny Walsh	Kildare	0–16	16	2	8.00
8	Pat Delaney	Kilkenny	2-09	15	3	5.00
8	P. J. Molloy	Galway	2-09	15	3	5.00

In a single game

Rank	Player	Club	Tally	Total	Opposition
1	Éamonn Cregan	Limerick	4-01	13	Cork
2	Johnny Walsh	Kildare	0–12	12	Wexford
3	John Grogan	Tipperary	1-08	11	Cork
4	Pat Delaney	Kilkenny	2-04	10	Westmeath
4	Pat Moylan	Cork	0–10	10	Wexford
4	Michael Cosgrave	Westmeath	0–10	10	Offaly
5	Matt Ruth	Kilkenny	1-06	9	Westmeath
5	John Neenan	Limerick	1-06	9	Clare
5	P. J. Molloy	Galway	1-06	9	Kerry
5	Colm Honan	Clare	0-09	9	Waterford

== Broadcasting ==
The following matches were broadcast live on television in Ireland on RTÉ.

Round	RTÉ
All-Ireland semi-final replay	Wexford vs Galway
All-Ireland final	Cork vs Wexford

== Player facts ==
=== Retirements ===
The following players made their retirement in the 1976 championship:

Player	Team	Date	Opposition	Game
Barney moylan	Offaly	June 6	Westmeath	Leinster quarter-final
