= Mick Butler (Wexford hurler) =

Irish former hurler

Personal information
- Born: 1950 (age 75–76) Kilmuckridge, County Wexford
- Height: 5 ft 10 in (178 cm)

Sport
- Sport: Hurling
- Position: Centre-forward
Club
- Years: Club
- 1960s-1980s: Buffer's Alley
Club titles
- Wexford titles: 10
- Leinster titles: 2
- All-Ireland Titles: 1
Inter-county
Years	County	Apps (scores)
1969-1981	Wexford	? (4-49)
Inter-county titles
- Leinster titles: 2
- All-Irelands: 0
- NHL: 0
- All Stars: 0

Mick Butler (born 1950 in Kilmuckridge, County Wexford) is an Irish former hurler. He played for his local club Buffer's Alley and was a member of the Wexford senior inter-county team from 1969 until 1981.
