= 1969 All-Ireland Under-21 Hurling Championship =

All-Ireland Under-21 Hurling Championship 1969
All Ireland Champions
- Winners: Cork (3rd win)
- Captain: Mick McCarthy

All Ireland Runners-up
- Runners-up: Wexford

Provincial Champions
- Munster: Cork
- Leinster: Wexford
- Ulster: Down
- Connacht: Not Played

The 1969 All-Ireland Under-21 Hurling Championship was the 6th staging of the All-Ireland Under-21 Hurling Championship since its establishment by the Gaelic Athletic Association in 1964.

Cork entered the championship as the defending champions.

On 14 September 1969, Cork won the championship following a 5-13 to 4-7 defeat of Wexford in the All-Ireland final. This was their 3rd All-Ireland title in the grade and their second in succession.

== Results ==
=== Leinster Under-21 Hurling Championship ===
Semi-finals

3 August 1969 Semi-final	Wexford	5-12 – 1-4	Westmeath

Final

10 August 1969 Final	Wexford	3-16 – 4-3	Kilkenny	Dr. Cullen Park

=== Munster Under-21 Hurling Championship ===
First round

23 April 1969 First round	Waterford	2-02 – 5-07	Cork	Fraher Field, Dungarvan
	S Keating 1-0, R Ormonde 1-0, M Hickey 0-1, D O'Meara 0-1.		W Walsh 2-2, S Murphy 1-0, M Malone 1-0, J O'Sullivan 1-0, B Meade 0-2, F Keane 0-2, P Moylan 0-1.

24 April 1969 First round	Tipperary	3-07 – 1-06	Limerick	MacDonagh Park, Nenagh
	P Byrne 1-0, J Walsh 1-0, B O'Neill 1-0, N O'Dwyer 0-2, T O'Connor 0-2, T Delaney 0-1, L Hackett 0-1, M Ryan 0-1.		J Ryan 1-0, S Foley 0-2, J McCarthy 0-1, P Hayes 0-1, P Hartigan 0-1, R Ryan 0-1.	Referee: D Crowe (Clare)

Semi-finals

2 July 1969 Semi-final	Tipperary	2-06 – 2-05	Clare	Thurles Sportsfield, Thurles
	M Coen 1-1, P Byrne 1-0, J Tynan 0-2, T Tierney 0-1, T Delaney 0-1, J Walshe 0-1.		J McNamara 0-4, D Fitzgerald 1-0, J McMahon 1-0, M Moroney 0-1.

29 July 1969 Semi-final	Cork	8-14 – 1-01	Galway	Gaelic Grounds, Limerick
	B Meade 2-9, W Walsh 3-0, R Cummins 2-1, N Dunne 1-0, F Keane 0-2, S Murphy 0-2.		F Kilkenny 1-0.

Final

10 August 1969 Final	Cork	3-11 – 1-05	Tipperary	Cork Athletic Grounds, Cork
	B Meade 1-5, R Cummins 1-3, M Malone 1-1, P Moylan 0-2.		M Coen 1-3, N O'Dwyer 0-2.	Referee: S O'Connor (Limerick)

=== Ulster Under-21 Hurling Championship ===
Final

20 July 1969 Final	Down	5-17 – 2-11	Antrim	McKenna Park

=== All-Ireland Under-21 Hurling Championship ===
Semi-final

24 August 1969 Semi-final	Down	2-1 – 12-10	Wexford	St. Patrick's Park
	M Coleman 1-0, S Ritchie 1-0, J Dumigan 0-1.		J Byrne 4-2, M Butler 2-3, M Casey 2-0, T Rice 1-1, S Edwards 1-1, E McDonnell 1-0, B Howlin 1-0, C Doran 0-1, M Browne 0-1, N Buggy 0-1.

Final

14 September 1969 Final	Cork	5-13 – 4-7	Wexford	Walsh Park
	R Cummins 2-4, B Meade 0-5, W Walsh 1-1, S Murphy 1-1, B Cummins 1-0, F Keane 0-1, P Moylan 0-1.		M Butler 2-0, T Royce 1-3, M Dalton 1-0, N Buggy 0-3, M Quigley 0-1.	Referee: B Johnson (Kilkenny)
