= 1977 All-Ireland Senior Hurling Championship =

Championship details
- Dates: 5 June – 4 September 1977
- Teams: 13

All-Ireland champions
- Winning team: Cork (23rd win)
- Captain: Martin O'Doherty

All-Ireland Finalists
- Losing team: Wexford
- Captain: Tony Doran

Provincial champions
- Munster: Cork
- Leinster: Wexford
- Ulster: Not Played
- Connacht: Not Played

Championship statistics
- No. matches played: 13
- Top Scorer: Charlie McCarthy (2–17); Ned Buggy (2–17)
- Player of the Year: Denis Coughlan
- All-Star Team: See here

The All-Ireland Senior Hurling Championship of 1977 was the 91st staging of Ireland's premier hurling knock-out competition. Cork won the championship, beating Wexford 1–17 to 3–8 in the final at Croke Park, Dublin.

== The championship ==
=== Format ===
Munster Championship

First round: (1 match) This is a single match between the first two teams drawn from the province of Munster. One team is eliminated at this stage while the winners advance to the semi-finals.

Semi-finals: (2 matches) The winner of the first round joins the other three Munster teams to make up the semi-final pairings. Two teams are eliminated at this stage while the winners advance to the final.

Final: (1 match) The winner of the two semi-finals contest this game. One team is eliminated at this stage while the winners advance to the All-Ireland semi-final.

Leinster Championship

First round: (2 matches) These are two matches between the first four teams drawn from the province of Leinster. Two teams are eliminated at this stage while the winners advance to the semi-finals.

Semi-finals: (2 matches) The winners of the two first-round games join the other two Leinster teams to make up the semi-final pairings. Two teams are eliminated at this stage while the winners advance to the final.

Final: (1 match) The winners of the two semi-finals contest this game. One team is eliminated at this stage while the winners advance to the All-Ireland final.

All-Ireland Championship

Quarter-final: (1 match) This is a single match between Galway and the winners of the All-Ireland 'B' championship. One team is eliminated at this stage while the winners advance to the semi-final.

Semi-final: (1 match) This is a single match between the Munster champions and the winners of the quarter-final. One team is eliminated at this stage while the winners advance to the final.

Final: (1 match) The winners of the semi-final and the Leinster champions contest this game.

== Provincial championships ==
=== Leinster Senior Hurling Championship ===
June 5
First Round

Kildare	4–11 – 4–9	Westmeath
G. Frayne (2–1), M. Deeley (1–2), J. Walsh (0–5), B. Burke (1–1), J. O'Brien (0–1), L. Shinners (0–1).		M. Cosgrave (1–7), J. Lynch (1–1), N. Fitzsimons (1–0), M. Newman (1–0), P. Curran (0–1).

O'Moore Park, Portlaoise
Referee: G. Kirwan (Offaly)

June 12
First Round

Dublin	3–10 – 2–8	Offaly
T. Grealish (2–0), M. Reidy (1–2), L. Hennebry (0–3), P. Carton (0–2), L. Deegan (0–1), C. Hennebry (0–1), V. Holden (0–1).		M. Cleere (0–7), K. Mooney (1–0), E. Coughlan (1–0), J. Kelly (0–1).

Cusack Park, Mullingar
Referee: J. Rankins (Laois))

June 26
Semi-Final

Wexford	2–25 – 0–9	Kildare
N. Buggy (0–8), T. Doran (1–4), M. Quigley (1–3), P. Hanrick (0–4), J. Quigley (0–3), M. Butler (0–2), M. Casey (0–1).		J. Walsh (0–7), B. Burke (0–2).

Wexford Park, Wexford
Referee: G. Kirwan (Offaly)

June 26
Semi-Final

Kilkenny	5–12 – 2–8	Dublin
L. O'Brien (1–7), M. Ruth (3–0), E. Keher (1–0), B. Cody (0–2), P. Grace (0–2), M. Crotty (0–1).		S. Kinsella (1–0), M. Reidy (1–0), L. Walsh (0–2), T. Grealish (0–2), L. Deegan (0–2), J. Towell (0–1), C. Hennebry (0–1).

Wexford Park, Wexford
Referee: N. Matthews (Wexford)

July 24
Final

Wexford	3–17 – 3–14	Kilkenny
N. Buggy (1–5), T. Doran (2–1), C. Kehoe (0–4), M. Quigley (0–3), J. Murphy (0–1), J. Quigley (0–1), M. Butler (0–1), M. Jacob (0–1).		E. Keher (1–4), B. Cody (1–2), B. Fitzpatrick (1–2), M. Crotty (0–4), K. Purcell (0–1), M. Ruth (0–1).

Croke Park, Dublin
Attendance: 30,614
Referee: J. Rankins (Laois)

=== Munster Senior Hurling Championship ===
June 5
First Round

Clare	1–10 – 0–13	Tipperary
N. Casey (1–0), M. Moroney (0–3), C. Honan (0–2), P. O'Connor (0–1), J. McNamara (0–1), E. O'Connor (0–1), J. Callinan (0–1), S. Stack (0–1).		P. Quigley (0–6), P. Fitzelle (0–1), T. O'Connor (0–1), J. Kehoe (0–1), N. O'Dwyer (0–1), M. Doyle (0–1), T. Butler (0–1), T. O'Dwyer (0–1).

Gaelic Grounds, Limerick
Attendance: 20,703
Referee: F. Murphy (Cork)

June 12
First Round Replay

Clare	0–13 – 1–7	Tipperary
M. Moroney (0–3), P. O'Connor (0–3), C. Honan (0–2), J. Callinan (0–2), E. O'Connor (0–1), N. Casey (0–1), J. McNamara (0–1).		S. Ryan (1–3), P. Quigley (0–2), P. Queally (0–1), J. Kehoe (0–1).

Gaelic Grounds, Limerick
Attendance: 20,546
Referee: F. Murphy (Cork)

June 19
Semi-Final

Cork	4–13 – 3–11	Waterford
C. McCarthy (1–5), S. O'Leary (2–0), R. Cummins (1–1), M. Malone (0–2), P. Moylan (0–2), T. Crwoley (0–1), J. Barry-Murphy (0–1), T. Cashman (0–1).		M. Hickey (2–0), P. Kelly (1–2), D. Fitzpatrick (0–3), J. Galvin (0–2), M. Walsh (0–2), J. Dalton (0–1), M. Whelan (0–1).

Semple Stadium, Thurles
Attendance: 8,905
Referee: J. Moloney (Tipperary)

June 26
Semi-Final

Clare	0–14 – 1–9	Limerick
C. Honan (0–5), M. Moroney (0–3), J. Callinan (0–2), J. McNamara (0–2), P. O'Connor (0–2).		E. Cregan (1–6), P. Hartigan (0–1), M. Carroll (0–1), W. Fitzmaurice (0–1).

Semple Stadium, Thurles
Attendance: 24,150
Referee: N. Dalton (Waterford)

July 10
Final

Cork	4–15 – 4–10	Clare
J. Barry-Murphy (2–0), C. McCarthy (0–5), T. Cashman (0–5), R. Cummins (1–0), T. Crowley (1–0), M. Malone (0–2), S. O'Leary (0–1), G. McCarthy (0–1), P. McDonnell (0–1).		C. Honan (1–5), N. Casey (2–0), E. O'Connor (1–0), J. McNamara (0–2), J. Callinan (0–2), M. Moroney (0–1).

Semple Stadium, Thurles
Attendance: 44,586
Referee: N. Dalton (Waterford)

== All-Ireland Senior Hurling Championship ==
=== All-Ireland quarter-finals ===
July 17
Quarter-Final

Galway	2–12 – 0–8	Laois
V. Mullins (1–1), P. J. Qualter (1–1), P. J. Molloy (0–4), P. Fahy (0–3), J. Connolly (0–1), F. Burke (0–1), M. Connolly (0–1).		M. Walsh (0–4), J. Mahon (0–2), M. Cuddy (0–1), M. Aherne (0–1).

St. Brendan's Park, Birr
Attendance: 6,000
Referee: S. O'Grady (Limerick)

=== All-Ireland semi-finals ===
August 7
Semi-Final

Cork	3–14 – 1–15	Galway
C. McCarthy (1–2), S. O'Leary (1–2), J. Barry-Murphy (1–0), T. Crowley (0–3), G. McCarthy (0–2), D. McCurtain (0–2), T. Cashman (0–1), R. Cummins (0–1), J. Horgan (0–1).		P. J. Molloy (0–7), J. Connolly (1–3), I. Clarke (0–2), M. Curtin (0–1), M. Connolly (0–1), V. Mullins (0–1).

Croke Park, Dublin
Attendance: 22,964
Referee: P. Johnston (Kilkenny)

=== All-Ireland final ===
September 4
Final

Cork	1–17 – 3–8	Wexford
G. McCarthy (0–6), S. O'Leary (1–2), C. McCarthy (0–5), J. Barry-Murphy (0–2), R. Cummins (0–1), T. Cashman (0–1).		N. Buggy (1–4), M. Butler (1–2), T. Doran (1–0), J. Quigley (0–1), C. Keogh (0–1).

Croke Park, Dublin
Attendance: 63,168
Referee: S. O'Grady (Limerick)

Cork	Wexford

Cork Team 1 Martin Coleman 2 Brian Murphy 3 Martin O'Doherty 4 John Horgan 5 Dermot MacCurtain 6 Johnny Crowley 7 Denis Coughlan 8 Tom Cashman 9 Tim Crowley 10 Mick Malone 11 Gerald McCarthy 12 Jimmy Barry Murphy 13 Charlie McCarthy 14 Ray Cummins 15 Seanie O'Leary Substitutes Pat Moylan for Mick Malone Tadhg Murphy for Gerald McCarthy Unused Substitutes Jerry Cronin, Pat McDonnell, Denis Burns, Teddy O'Brien, Pat Horgan Coach Fr Bertie Troy Trainer Kevin Kehilly Selectors Frank Murphy, Jimmy Brohan, Christy Ring, Denis Murphy, Johnny Clifford

== Championship statistics ==
=== Miscellaneous ===
- At the Munster final between Cork and Clare, three armed men entered the unguarded room, held up the Munster Council treasurer, Tadhg Crowley, and his assistants, and got away with £24,520.
- A dispute in manning levels resulted in two RTÉ cameramen refusing to film the Leinster final between Wexford and Kilkenny.

== Player facts ==
=== Debutantes ===
The following players made their début in the 1977 championship:

Player	Team	Date	Opposition	Game
Tom Cashman	Cork	June 19	Waterford	Munster semi-final
Dermot Mac Curtain	Cork	June 19	Waterford	Munster semi-final

=== Retirees ===
The following players played their last game in the 1977 championship:

Player	Team	Date	Opposition	Game	Début
Eddie Keher	Kilkenny	July 24	Wexford	Leinster final	1959

== Top scorers ==
=== Season ===
Rank	Player	County	Tally	Total	Matches	Average
1	Charlie McCarthy	Cork	2–17	23	4	5.75
1	Ned Buggy	Wexford	2–17	23	3	7.66
3	Seánie O'Leary	Cork	4–5	17	4	4.25
3	Tony Doran	Wexford	4–5	17	3	5.66
3	Colm Honan	Clare	1–14	17	4	4.25
6	Jimmy Barry-Murphy	Kilkenny	3–3	12	4	3.00
6	Johnny Walsh	Kildare	0–12	12	2	6.00
8	P. J. Molloy	Galway	0–11	11	2	5.50
9	Noel Casey	Clare	3–1	10	4	2.50
10	Matt Ruth	Kilkenny	3–1	10	2	5.00
10	Eddie Keher	Kilkenny	2–4	10	2	5.00
10	Liam O'Brien	Kilkenny	1–7	10	2	5.00
10	Mick Moroney	Clare	0–10	10	4	2.50
10	Michael Cosgrove	Westmeath	1–7	10	1	10.00

=== Single game ===
Rank	Player	County	Tally	Total	Opposition
1	Michael Cosgrove	Westmeath	1–7	10	Kildare
1	Liam O'Brien	Kilkenny	1–7	10	Dublin
3	Matt Ruth	Kilkenny	3–0	9	Dublin
3	Éamonn Cregan	Limerick	1–6	9	Clare
5	Ned Buggy	Wexford	1–5	8	Kilkenny
5	Charlie McCarthy	Cork	1–5	8	Waterford
5	Colm Honan	Clare	1–5	8	Cork
5	Ned Buggy	Wexford	0–8	8	Kildare
9	G. Frayne	Kildare	2–1	7	Westmeath
9	Tony Doran	Wexford	2–1	7	Kilkenny
9	Tony Doran	Wexford	1–4	7	Kildare
9	Eddie Keher	Kilkenny	1–4	7	Wexford
9	Ned Buggy	Wexford	1–4	7	Cork
9	Mick Cleere	Offaly	0–7	7	Dublin
9	Johnny Walsh	Kildare	0–7	7	Wexford
9	P. J. Molloy	Galway	0–7	7	Cork

== Broadcasting ==
The following matches were broadcast live on television in Ireland on RTÉ.

Round	RTÉ
All-Ireland semi-final	Cork vs Galway
All-Ireland final	Cork vs Wexford
