= Matt Ruth =

Irish hurler and Gaelic footballer

Personal information
- Native name: Maitiú de Rút (Irish)
- Born: Ballyragget, County Kilkenny
- Occupation: Primary school teacher
- Height: 6 ft 1 in (185 cm)

Sport
- Sport: Hurling
- Position: Left corner-forward
Clubs
- Years: Club
- Old Christians; Commercials; St Patrick's
Inter-county
Years	County	Apps (scores)
1973–1974 1975–1983	Limerick; Kilkenny	4; 16
Inter-county titles
- Leinster titles: 4 (1 as sub)
- All-Irelands: 3 (2 as sub)
- NHL: 2
- All Stars: 0

Matt Ruth (born December 1945 in Ballyragget, County Kilkenny) is an Irish former sportsman. He played hurling and Gaelic football at various times with his local clubs, Old Christians, Commercials, and St Patrick's. He was a member of the Limerick and Kilkenny senior inter-county teams from 1973 until 1983. Ruth's son, Matthew, played minor hurling with Kilkenny in 2008.
