= 1971 All-Ireland Under-21 Hurling Championship =

All-Ireland Under-21 Hurling Championship 1971
All Ireland Champions
- Winners: Cork (5th win)
- Captain: Pat McDonnell

All Ireland Runners-up
- Runners-up: Wexford
- Captain: Martin Quigley

Provincial Champions
- Munster: Cork
- Leinster: Wexford
- Ulster: Down
- Connacht: Galway

The 1971 All-Ireland Under-21 Hurling Championship was the eighth staging of Ireland's hurling knock-out competition for players aged between 18 and 21. Cork won the championship, beating Wexford 7-8 to 1-11 in the final.

== The championship ==
=== Format ===
==== All-Ireland Championship ====
Semi-finals: (2 matches) The three provincial winners join Galway to make up the four semi-finalists. The pairings are Munster v Ulster and Leinster v Galway. Two teams are eliminated at this stage while two teams advance to the All-Ireland final.

Final: (1 match) The winners of the two semi-finals contest the All-Ireland final.

== Results ==
=== Leinster Under-21 Hurling Championship ===
12 May 1971 First round	Kildare	v	Carlow	St. Conleth's Park, Newbridge

19 May 1971 First round	Dublin	4-10 - 1-09	Westmeath	O'Toole Park, Dublin

12 May 1971 First round	Wicklow	v	Meath	Ashford

13 May 1971 First round	Laois	v	Offaly	O'Moore Park, Portlaoise

Second round

2 June 1971 Second round	Wexford	6-24 - 1-04	Kildare	Dr. Cullen Park, Carlow

9 June 1971 Second round	Meath	3-06 - 4-03	Dublin	St. Loman's Park, Trim
	F McCann 0-5, E O'Neill 1-1, C Geoghegan 1-0, J Gorman 1-0.		C Hanley 1-2, B Lee 1-1, J Towell 1-0, C Henneberry 1-0.

20 June 1971 Second round replay	Dublin	5-14 - 0-03	Meath	Dr. Cullen Park, Carlow
	J Towell 3-2, C Hanley 1-2, B Lee 1-1, C Henneberry 0-3, PJ Holden 0-3, V Holden 0-2, P Lee 0-1.		F McGann 0-2, P McLoughlin 0-1.

Semi-finals

v

4 July 1971 Semi-final	Kilkenny	5-15 - 3-08	Dublin	Dr. Cullen Park, Carlow
	L Phelan 0-10, M Hughes 2-1, J Doyle 2-0, D McNamara 1-1, M Brennan 0-1, D Murphy 0-1, J McCarthy 0-1.		J Towell 3-0, PJ Holden 0-3, V Holden 0-2, P Lee 0-1, C Hanly 0-1, N Rooney 0-1.

Final

21 July 1971 Final	Wexford	2-16 - 2-09	Kilkenny	Dr. Cullen Park, Carlow
	T Byrne 2-4, S Kinsella 0-4, L Bennett 0-3, M Casey 0-2, B Dunne 0-1, T Walsh 0-1, M Butler 0-1.		W Phelan 0-5, M Hughes 1-0, D McNamara 1-0, T Waters 0-2, M Drennan 0-1, M Brennan 0-1.	Referee: R Sheppard (Carlow)

=== Munster Under-21 Hurling Championship ===
First round

25 May 1971 First round	Tipperary	2-05 – 2-04	Limerick	MacDonagh Park, Nenagh
	J Carey 1-1, J Tynan 1-1, J Fogarty 0-1, W Moloney 0-1, PJ Caplis 0-1.		M Aherne 1-2, L O'Donoghue 1-1, S Condon 0-1.

Semi-finals

13 July 1971 Semi-final	Waterford	3-09 – 5-12	Tipperary	Walsh Park, Waterford
	T Doyle 2-2, A Heffernan 1-5, M Holland 0-1, M Ormond 0-1.		P O'Neill 2-2, S Power 1-2, S Carey 1-1, T Dwyer 1-0, T Duggan 0-3, J Noonan 0-3, J Tynan 0-1.	Referee: P Cronin (Clare)

13 July 1971 Semi-final	Cork	1-11 – 2-08	Clare	Gaelic Grounds, Limerick
	M Malone 1-1, S O'Leary 0-3, K McSweeney 0-2, D Collins 0-1, N Crowley 0-1, J Horgan 0-1, E Fitzpatrick 0-1.		M O'Connor 2-0, C O'Neill 0-3, S Durack 0-2, H Russell 0-1, M McKeogh 0-1, C Woods 0-1.

20 July 1971 Semi-final replay	Cork	6-09 – 0-05	Clare	Gaelic Grounds, Limerick
	S O'Leary 2-3, E Fitzpatrick 2-1, J Rothwell 2-0, K McSweeney 0-3, B Coleman 0-1, N Crowley 0-1.		S Durack 0-2, C Woods 0-1, C Honan 0-1, M McKeogh 0-1.	Referee: J Moloney (Tipperary)

Final

28 July 1971 Final	Cork	5-11 – 4-09	Tipperary	Cork Athletic Grounds, Cork
	S O'Leary 1-9, J Rothwell 1-0, K McSweeney 1-0, N Crowley 1-0, E Fitzpatrick 1-0, S Looney 0-1, M Malone 0-1.		P O'Neill 2-3, T Dwyer 2-0, S Power 0-3, J Duggan 0-2, J Tynan 0-1.	Referee: S O'Connor (Limerick)

=== All-Ireland Under-21 Hurling Championship ===
Semi-finals

1 August 1971 Semi-final	Cork	11-10 – 2-11	Down	Cork Athletic Grounds, Cork
	J Rothwell 4-1, M Malone 3-1, S O'Leary 1-5, E Fitzpatrick 2-0, N Crowley 1-0, S Looney 0-2, K McSweeney 0-1.		M Coleman 1-6, J McGrattan 1-0, S McGrattan 0-2, S Sands 0-1, G Lennon 0-1, B Gilmore 0-1.

22 August 1971 Semi-final	Galway	0-09 – 4-08	Wexford	Ballinasloe
	PJ Molloy 0-3, M Donoghue 0-3, E Donoghue 0-1, M Greaney 0-1.		T Byrne 1-4, M Butler 1-2, S Kinsella 1-0, B Dunne 1-0, M Quigley 0-1, G Coone 0-1, M Casey 0-1.

Final

12 September 1971 Final	Cork	7-08 – 1-11	Wexford	Croke Park, Dublin
	J Rothwell 4-0, S O'Leary 2-4, B Cummins 1-0, P Kavanagh 0-2, M Malone 0-1, K McSweeney 0-1.		M Butler 1-2, M Casey 0-3, L Bennett 0-2, T Byrne 0-2, J Russell 0-1, B Dunne 0-1.	Referee: P Buggy (Kilkenny)

== Championship statistics ==
=== Miscellaneous ===
- Cork's victory in the championship decider is the county's fourth All-Ireland title in succession and fifth in six years. The 'four-in-a-row' is a record which still stands as of 2010.
- Wexford become the first team to lose three All-Ireland finals in-a-row.

4 goals in a final and 4 goals and a point in semi-final at U21 by John (Rocky) Rothwell are high scoring records which still stand as of 2013.
