= 1968 All-Ireland Minor Hurling Championship =

All-Ireland Minor Hurling Championship 1968
All Ireland Champions
- Winners: Wexford (3rd win)
- Captain: Tom Byrne

All Ireland Runners-up
- Runners-up: Cork
- Captain: Denis McCarthy

Provincial Champions
- Munster: Cork
- Leinster: Wexford
- Ulster: Not Played
- Connacht: Not Played

The 1968 All-Ireland Minor Hurling Championship was the 38th staging of the All-Ireland Minor Hurling Championship since its establishment by the Gaelic Athletic Association in 1928.

Cork entered the championship as the defending champions.

On 1 September 1968 Wexford won the championship following a 2-13 to 3-7 defeat of Cork in the All-Ireland final. This was their third All-Ireland title and their first in two championship seasons. It remains their last All-Ireland success.

== Results ==
=== Leinster Minor Hurling Championship ===
Quarter-finals

19 May 1968 Quarter-final	Offaly	3-9 - 3-6	Laois	Cusack Park, Mullingar

Semi-finals

7 July 1968 Semi-final	Kilkenny	6-12 - 1-3	Offaly	O'Moore Park, Portlaoise

7 July 1968 Semi-final	Wexford	5-14 - 3-6	Dublin	Dr. Cullen Park, Carlow

Final

14 July 1968 Final	Wexford	4-11 - 4-4	Kilkenny	Croke Park, Dublin
	M Butler 1-4, P Walsh 1-2, J Murphy 1-1, T Byrne 1-1, M Quigley 0-2, M Casey 0-1.		J Brennan 2-0, T Walters 1-2, D Prendergast 1-2.

=== Munster Minor Hurling Championship ===
Quarter-finals

19 May 1968 Quarter-final	Waterford	8-7 - 2-2	Clare	Thurles Sportsfield, Thurles

26 May 1968 Quarter-final	Cork	9-9 - 4-6	Limerick	Thurles Sportsfield, Thurles

Semi-finals

30 June 1968 Semi-final	Waterford	7-5 - 4-5	Tipperary	Athletic Grounds, Cork

30 June 1968 Semi-final	Cork	10-14 - 2-5	Galway	Gaelic Grounds, Limerick

Final

21 July 1968 Final	Cork	7-8 - 4-2	Waterford	Gaelic Grounds, Limerick
	M Malone 2-2, T Buckley 1-4, J Rothwell 2-0, D McCarthy 2-0, P Ring 0-2.		L Frazer 1-0, M Keating 1-0, J Goulding 1-0, P Morrissey 1-0, T Coffey 0-1, P Curley 0-1.

=== All-Ireland Minor Hurling Championship ===
Semi-final

28 July 1968 Semi-final	Wexford	5-11 - 1-7	Antrim	Croke Park, Dublin
	S Murphy 2-0, M Quigley 1-3, M Butler 1-1, T Walsh 1-1, P Kennedy 0-2, L Byrne 0-1, M Casey 0-1, T Byrne 0-1, P Walsh 0-1.		M Tohill 0-4, J O'Neill 1-0, A Rowan 0-1, T McCann 0-1, T Conway 0-1.	Referee: J Gray (Dublin)

Final

1 September 1968 Final	Wexford	2-13 - 3-7	Cork	Croke Park, Dublin
	M Butler 1-6, M Quigley 0-4, L Byrne 1-0, M Casey 0-1, J Murphy 0-1, P Walsh 0-1.		P Ring 2-4, D McCarthy 1-0, T Buckley 0-2, G O'Sullivan 0-1.	Referee: M Slattery (Clare)
