= 1967 All-Ireland Minor Hurling Championship =

Irish hurling competition

All-Ireland Minor Hurling Championship 1967
All Ireland Champions
- Winners: Cork (8th win)

All Ireland Runners-up
- Runners-up: Wexford

Provincial Champions
- Munster: Cork
- Leinster: Wexford
- Ulster: Not Played
- Connacht: Not Played

The 1967 All-Ireland Senior Hurling Championship was the 37th staging of the All-Ireland Minor Hurling Championship since its establishment by the Gaelic Athletic Association in 1928.

Wexford entered the championship as the defending champions.

On 3 September 1967, Cork won the championship following a 2-15 to 5-3 defeat of Wexford in the All-Ireland final. This was their 8th All-Ireland title, their first in three championship seasons.

== Results ==
=== Leinster Minor Hurling Championship ===
First round

9 April 1967	Wicklow	3-5 – 2-6	Kildare	Ashford GAA Grounds

7 May 1967	Meath	11-6 – 3-1	Louth	Geraldine Park, Athy

14 May 1967	Laois	6-13 – 6-4	Carlow	Geraldine Park, Athy

Quarter-finals

20 June 1967 Quarter-final	Westmeath	4-9 – 4-4	Laois

Semi-finals

2 July 1967 Semi-final	Dublin	3-8 – 2-9	Kilkenny	Dr. Cullen Park, Carlow

9 July 1967 Semi-final	Wexford	10-10 – 2-9	Westmeath	O'Connor Park, Tullamore

Final

16 July 1967 Final	Wexford	6-7 – 2-3	Dublin	Croke Park, Dublin
	M Butler 2-2, M Casey 2-0, P Walsh 1-1, SB Murphy 1-0, A Kavanagh 0-2, M Quigley 0-1, P Byrne 0-1.		L Matthews 1-1, C Hood 1-0, L Henberry 0-1, P McShane 0-1.

=== Munster Minor Hurling Championship ===
Quarter-finals

14 May 1967 Quarter-final	Galway	9-12 – 0-2	Kerry	Gaelic Grounds, Limerick

14 May 1967 Quarter-final	Cork	4-10 – 2-9	Waterford	Páirc Mac Gearailt, Fermoy

Semi-finals

2 July 1967 Semi-final	Cork	5-15 – 3-1	Tipperary	Athletic Grounds, Cork

9 July 1967 Semi-final	Limerick	4-6 – 2-3	Galway	Cusack Park, Ennis

Final

30 July 1967 Final	Limerick	0-3 – 4-10	Cork	Gaelic Grounds, Limerick
	A Gubbins 0-2, T Brennan 0-1.		P Ring 1-4, T Buckley 1-2, M Malone 1-1, B O'Connor 1-0, P Moylan 0-1, S Murphy 0-1, J Horgan 0-1.

=== All-Ireland Minor Hurling Championship ===
Semi-final

30 July 1967 Semi-final	Antrim	5-3 – 12-7	Wexford	Casement Park, Belfast
	A Hamill 3-1, J O'Neill 1-0, R Martin 1-0, S Collins 0-1, A Connolly 0-1.		M Quigley 5-2, M Casey 4-1, S McAuley 1-2, P Byrne 1-2, J Murphy 1-0.

Final

3 September 1967 Final	Cork	2-15 – 5-3	Wexford	Croke Park, Dublin
	P Ring 0-7, T Buckley 1-1, B O'Connor 1-1, J Horgan 0-3, J Barrett 0-2, S Murphy 0-1.		P Byrne 3-1, J Murphy 1-0, M Casey 1-0, M Butler 0-1, A Kavanagh 0-1.	Referee: P Johnson (Kilkenny)
