= List of Cork Premier Senior Hurling Championship runners-up =

This is a list of all teams and players who have ended up as a runner-up in the final of the Cork Senior Hurling Championship since its inception in 1887.

== By team ==
The 138 Cork Senior Championships have been lost by 38 different teams. Blackrock have lost the most finals. The most recent runners-up are St Finbarr's, who lost the 2026 final.

#	Team	Losses	Losing Years
1	Blackrock	20	1892, 1914, 1918, 1919, 1922, 1923, 1926, 1939, 1948, 1954, 1959, 1963, 1974, 1976, 1982, 1986, 1998, 2003, 2017, 2022
2	Glen Rovers	18	1930, 1946, 1951, 1955, 1956, 1973, 1975, 1977, 1978, 1980, 1981, 1988, 1991, 2010, 2014, 2019, 2020, 2021
3	St. Finbarr's	16	1901, 1903, 1925, 1929, 1934, 1944, 1950, 1952, 1958, 1964, 1967, 1971, 1979, 1983, 1990, 2026
4	Sarsfields	11	1909, 1936, 1940, 1947, 1953, 1989, 1997, 2009, 2013, 2015, 2024
5	Midleton	9	1908, 1913, 1917, 1938, 1985, 1994, 2018, 2023, 2025
6	University College Cork	7	1957, 1960, 1962, 1965, 1966, 1969
7	Redmonds	5	1893, 1899, 1912, 1924, 1927
7	Carrigtwohill	5	1898, 1932, 1933, 1935, 1937
9	Imokilly	4	1949, 1968, 1996, 2001
10	Aghada	3	1889, 1890, 1897
10	Ballyhea	3	1895, 1984, 1995
10	Ballincollig	3	1941, 1942, 1943
10	Cloyne	3	2004, 2005, 2006
14	Ballygarvan	2	1888, 1896
14	Dungourney	2	1900, 1910
14	Castletownroche	2	1904, 1907
14	Na Piarsaigh	2	1987, 1992
14	Erin's Own	2	2000, 2016
14	Newtownshandrum	2	2002, 2007
20	Passage	1	1887
20	Inniscarra	1	1891
20	Blarney	1	1894
20	Shanballymore	1	1902
20	Ballymartle	1	1906
20	Aghabullogue	1	1911
20	Collegians	1	1915
20	Shamrocks	1	1916
20	Fairhill	1	1920
20	Mallow	1	1928
20	Éire Óg	1	1931
20	Carrigdhoun	1	1945
20	Avondhu	1	1961
20	Muskerry	1	1970
20	Youghal	1	1972
20	Carbery	1	1993
20	Bride Rovers	1	2008
20	Cork Institute of Technology	1	2011
20	Bishopstown	1	2012

== By year ==
List of Cork Senior Hurling Championship runners-up
Year	Team	Players	Ref
1962	University College Cork	J O'Donoghue, T Conway, D Kiely, N Phelan, H Byrne, D Kelleher, J Ally, O Harrington, M Murphy, J O'Halloran, J Blake, M Mortell, G Allen, D Flynn, D Murphy. Sub: J Carroll.	
1963	Blackrock	N O'Connell, T O'Connell, D Brenner, J O'Brien, J Brohan, M Cashman, E Burke, J Hayes, T Kelly, V Foley, J Bennett, J O'Leary, J Redmond, F O'Mahony, B Galligan. Subs: C O'Leary, W Coughlan, DJ Crowley.	
1964	St. Finbarr's	J Power, N McCarthy, T O'Mullane, D Murphy, T Kirby, P Doolan, J Hogan, P Finn, Jerry McCarthy, C Roche, G McCarthy, M Finn, C McCarthy, W Walsh, M Archer. Subs: W Doyle, P O'Connell.	
1965	University College Cork	T O'Shea, T Field, M McCormack, N Rea, J O'Keeffe, D Kelleher, T Walsh, W Cronin, P O'Riordan, S Barry, J O'Halloran, D Harnedy, J McCarthy, J Blake, D Harnedy. Subs: J Long, M Fahy.	
1966	University College Cork	J Mitchell, T Field, M McCormack, D Kelleher, D O'Sullivan, P O'Connell, P Crowley, P Dooley, W Cronin, S Barry, J O'Halloran, N Morgan, B Kenneally, D Philpott, J McCarthy. Subs: M Murphy, M Fahy.	
1967	St. Finbarr's	J Power, P Doolan, B McKeown, J Barrett, T Kirby, D Murphy, T Maher, G McCarthy, J Keating, C Roche, E Philpott, P Freaney, M Archer, T Connolly, C McCarthy. Subs: B Scully, J Archer.	
1968	Imokilly	W Glavin, P Dunne, J Ryan, J O'Riordan, O'Keeffe, W Ryan, P O'Sullivan, P Fitzgerald, W Walsh, S Barry, N Gallagher, P Hegarty, M Hegarty, D Daly, P Ring. Subs: T Meaney, D Clifford, T Buckley.	
1969	University College Cork	J Mitchell, M McCarthy, J Kelly, P Crowley (c), J Looney, D Clifford, P McDonnell, M Murphy, J Barrett, F Kilkenny, J O'Halloran, D Motherway, T Buckley, R Cummins, N Morgan. Sub: W Moore.	
1970	Muskerry	S O'Mahony, N Creedon, T Brennan, D McSweeney (c), T O'Mahony, B Murphy, A Twomey, F Long, J Sheehy, N Dunne, T Ryan, C Kelly, B Kenneally, M Malone, P Lucey. Subs: T Dunne, S Noonan.	
1971	St. Finbarr's	J Power, B Scully, T Maher (c), P Doolan, T Roche, D Burns, T Kirby, G McCarthy, S Gillen, C Cullinane, B O'Brien, C McCarthy, M Archer, D McCarthy, J Barry-Murphy. Subs: M O'Mahony, D O'Grady, M Bohane.	
1972	Youghal	P Barry, L Leahy, M Coleman, J O'Malley, J Griffin, P Hegarty, M Conway, R O'Sullivan, W Doyle, N Hogan, N Gallagher, W Walsh, F Keane, F Cooper (c), S O'Leary. Subs: S Ring, J Lawlor.	
1973	Glen Rovers	F O'Neill, J O'Sullivan, M O'Doherty, D O'Riordan, D Coughlan (c), P Barry, T O'Brien, M Corbett, R Crowley, T Buckley, P O'Doherty, P Harte, M Ryan, L McAuliffe, J Young. Sub: JJ O'Neill.	
1974	Blackrock	T Murphy, John Rothwell, C O'Brien, F Norberg, B Cummins, J Horgan, F Cummins, T Cashman, P Kavanagh, D Collins, J Russell, P Moylan, E O'Sullivan, J O'Halloran, É O'Donoghue. Subs: M Waters, D McCurtain.	
1975	Glen Rovers	F O'Sullivan, J Kennefick, M O'Doherty, P Barry, J O'Sullivan, D Coughlan, T O'Brien (c), R Crowley, M O'Halloran, P Harte, L McAuliffe, P Horgan, JJ O'Neill, T Collins, F Cunningham. Sub. T O'Neill.	
1976	Blackrock	T Murphy, F Norberg, C O'Brien, John Rothwell, F Cummins, J Horgan, D McCurtain, T Cashman, P Moylan, P Kavanagh, B Cummins, J Murphy, P Butler, R Cummins (c), É O'Donoghue. Subs: D Collins, E O'Sullivan, D Buckley.	
1977	Glen Rovers	F O'Neill (c), J O'Sullivan, M O'Doherty, T O'Brien, F O'Sullivan, D Clifford, D Coughlan, P O'Doherty, JJ O'Neill, P Horgan, L McAuliffe, R Crowley, M Ryan, T Collins, P Harte.	
1978	Glen Rovers	F O'Sullivan, P Barry, M O'Doherty, T Treacy, D O'Donovan, P Horgan, D Coughlan, JJ O'Neill, J Buckley, J O'Brien, R Crowley, P O'Doherty, M Ryan, T Collins, T O'Brien. Subs: K O'Keeffe, L McAuliffe, J O'Sullivan.	
1979	St. Finbarr's	G Cunningham, T Butler, Tony Maher, J Blake, N Kennefick, D O'Grady, B O'Driscoll, G McCarthy, B O'Brien, Tom Maher, C Ryan, J Allen, C McCarthy, J Barry-Murphy, É Fitzpatrick. Subs: J Murphy, B Wiley, J O'Shea.	
1980	Glen Rovers	F O'Sullivan, M Murphy, P Barry, T O'Brien, R Crowley, P Horgan, D Coughlan (c), J O'Brien, J Killeen, JJ O'Neill, L Mulcahy, J Buckley, T O'Neill, P Ring, T Collins. Sub: K McGann.	
1981	Glen Rovers	F O'Sullivan, M Murphy, D Cronin, T O'Brien (c), R Crowley, P Horgan, D Coughlan, J O'Brien, J Killeen, J O'Neill, J Buckley, L Mulcahy, JJ O'Neill, T Ring, T Collins. Subs: R Whitley, L McAuliffe, J Hannigan.	
1982	Blackrock	T Murphy, F Norberg, C O'Brien, A Creagh, D McCurtain, F Cummins, P Deasy, P Moylan (c), F Collins, D Buckley, T Deasy, T Cashman, É O'Donoghue, R Cummins, M Kilcoyne. Sub: J Murphy.	
1983	St. Finbarr's	G Cunningham, J Hodgins, D O'Grady, J Blake, F Ramsey, J Allen, N Kennefick, W Cashman, J Cremin, T Maher, J Meyler, C Ryan, V Twomey, J Barry-Murphy, T Finn. Subs: D Walsh, É Fitzpatrick.	
1984	Ballyhea	D O'Keeffe, M O'Sullivan, M Morrissey, N Ronan, P Ryan, J Russell, J O'Callaghan, C Brassill (c), L O'Connor, G O'Connor, D O'Flynn, W Shanahan, D Ryan, D Hanley, L O'Halloran. Sub: M O'Callaghan.	
1985	Midleton	G Power, D Mulcahy, M Boylan, S O'Brien, S O'Mahony, P Hartnett (c), T McCarthy, J Fenton, J Hartnett, K Hennessy, C O'Neill, J Boylan, D Boylan, G FitzGerald, G Glavin. Subs: E Cleary, M Crotty.	
1986	Blackrock	J O'Leary, P Maher, R Browne, A Creagh (c), T Cashman, F Cummins, J Evans, M Kilcoyne, J Cashman, C Heffernan, P Kavanagh, P Deasy, E Kavanagh, É O'Donoghue, F Delaney. Sub: F Collins.	
1987	Na Piarsaigh	L Connery, C Connery, D O'Reilly, C Coughlan, J Whooley, J Hannifin, J O'Meara, T O'Sullivan, P O'Connor, R McDonnell, D Daly, M Mullins, D Murphy, L Forde, J O'Sullivan. Subs: M Kearney, C O'Donovan.	
1988	Glen Rovers	F O'Sullivan, R Murphy, L Martin, T Wall, K Fitzgibbon, P Horgan, C McGuckin, J Buckley, K Keane, K Dorgan, J O'Brien, R O'Connor, G O'Riordan, J Fitzgibbon, T Mulcahy (c). Subs: D Whitley, D Cooper.	
1989	Sarsfields	D Murphy, P Smith, J Considine, J Power, J Barry, T McCarthy, V Barry, D Kenneally, R Lotty, B Óg Murphy, T McAuliffe, T Murphy, N Ahern, P O'Callaghan. Sub: M O'Flynn.	
1990	St. Finbarr's	G Cunningham, S O'Leary, P O'Leary, J Blake, N Leonard, N Kennefick, F Ramsey (c), J Cremin, K Murphy, T Finn, C Ryan, B Cunningham, J Tobin, M Barry, T Leahy. Subs: J Griffin, J Meyler.	
1991	Glen Rovers	D Wallace, T Cummins, L Martin (c), C McGuckin, P Horgan, L Coffey, K McGuckin, D Whitley, K Keane, K Dorgan, C Ring, G Riordan, J Buckley, J Fitzgibbon, T Mulcahy. Subs: K Fitzgibbon, J O'Brien, J Fox.	
1992	Na Piarsaigh	L Connery, C Connery, J Hannifin, C Coughlan, M Dineen, L Forde, S Guiheen, T O'Sullivan, P O'Connor (c), Mickey Mullins, Mark Mullins, C O'Donovan, G Daly, J O'Connor, M O'Sullivan. Subs: G Maguire, J O'Sullivan.	
1993	Carbery	C Wilson (c), B Buckley, G Ryan, D Healy, M Holland, A White, J O'Sullivan, C Murphy, D O'Neill, D O'Donoghue, M Foley, P Crowley, B Harte, J O'Connell, D O'Connell. Subs: G Collins, T Crowley.	
1994	Midleton	G Power (c), Colman Quirke, M Boylan, E Murphy, P Smith, P Hartnett, W Wallis, K Roche, D Quirke, G FitzGerald, P O'Brien, Cormac Quirke, G Manley, K Hennessy, M O'Mahony. Sub: J Boylan.	
1995	Ballyhea	O Morrissey, D Riordan, E Crowley, M Mackessy, A O'Connor, E Morrissey, T Riordan, N Hanley, J O'Sullivan, A Morrissey (c), P O'Connell, C Hanley, I Ronan, M O'Callaghan, D Ronan. Subs: N Ronan, T O'Donoghue.	
1996	Imokilly	D Óg Cusack, W O'Riordan, D Irwin, B O'Driscoll, S Collins, M Daly, D O'Sullivan, B Kearney, M Landers (c), D Barrett, R Dwane, T McCarthy, P Cahill, J Smiddy, B Walsh. Sub: S O'Farrell.	
1997	Sarsfields	T Murphy, B McCarthy, P Smith (c), P O'Flynn, J Considine, T McCarthy, C McCarthy, P Ryan, T Óg Lynch, P O'Callaghan, B O'Callaghan, J Barry, J Murphy, N Ahern, C O'Leary. Subs: G Murphy, S Considine.	
1998	Blackrock	T Barry; J Browne, N Keane, G Murphy; J Smith, W Sherlock, F Ryan (c); C McBride, J Cashman; J O'Flynn, A Cummins, A Coughlan; B O'Keeffe, A Browne, D Dempsey. Subs: D Coakley; C O'Flaherty; B Hennebry.	
1999	University College Cork	B Kelly; D Twomey (c), N Murphy, L Mannix; P Mahon, D Murphy, B Harte; E Enright, R Flannery; J Enright, J O'Brien, D Bennett; E Bennett, J Kingston, J Deane. Subs: S Fitzpatrick, J Murray, J Murphy.	
2000	Erin's Own	Kieran Murphy; T O'Keeffe (c), M Dunne, D Mulcahy; T Kelleher, B Corcoran, S Murphy; F Horgan, P Kelly; Kevin Murphy, M O'Connor, J Corcoran; S Dunne, P Geasley, T O'Leary. Subs: F Murphy, K O'Shea.	
2001	Imokilly	B Rochford; J Flavin, S Barrett, B Murphy; M Landers (c), M Daly, G Melvin; D Barrett, J Barrett; B Coleman, R Dwane, J Brenner; J O'Driscoll, N McCarthy, J Deane.	
2002	Newtownshandrum	P Morrissey; AG O'Brien, B Mulcahy, J McCarthy; AT O'Brien, P Mulcahy, P Noonan; I Kelleher, D Murphy; D Mulcahy, M Morrissey (c), Jerry O'Connor; John O'Connor, B O'Connor, JP King. Subs: D Naughton; J Bowles; J O'Mahony; M Farrell; D Riordan	
2003	Blackrock	T Barry; W Sherlock (c), N Keane, J Browne; S Murphy, A Cummins, F Ryan; A Coughlan, P Tierney; B Hennebry, L Meaney, J Young; B O'Keeffe, A Browne, D Cashman. Sub: D Gosnell	
2004	Cloyne	D Óg Cusack (c); E O'Sullivan, K Cronin, D Motherway; Diarmuid O'Sullivan, M Cahill, Donal O'Sullivan; L O'Driscoll, M Naughton; P Cahill, C O'Sullivan, I Quinlan; P O’Sullivan, C Cusack, V Cusack. Subs: C Lomasney, B Fleming	
2005	Cloyne	D Óg Cusack (c); E O'Sullivan, K Cronin, D Motherway; Donal O'Sullivan, Diarmuid O'Sullivan, M Cahill; I Quinlan, M Naughton; P Cahill, C O'Sullivan, J Cotter; P O’Sullivan, C Cusack, V Cusack. Subs: L O'Driscoll; J Nyhan; V Cusack	
2006	Cloyne	D Óg Cusack; E O’Sullivan, D Motherway, B Fleming; L O’Driscoll, K Cronin, J Nyhan; J Cotter, Donal O’Sullivan; C O’Sullivan, Diarmuid O'Sullivan (c), M Naughton; P O’Sullivan, P Cahill, C Cusack. Subs: R McCarthy; V Cusack	
2007	Newtownshandrum	O Morrissey; J O’Mahony, B Mulcahy, D Gleeson; PJ Copse, P Mulcahy, P Noonan (c); AT O’Brien, Jerry O'Connor; J Bowles, B O’Connor, JP King; C Naughton, R Clifford, John O’Connor. Subs: S O’Riordan; M Bowles; J Herlihy; D Mulcahy; G O’Mahony	
2008	Bride Rovers	D Fitzgerald; A Collins, B Walsh, T Moloney; Barry Murphy, Brian Murphy (c), J Murphy; P Murphy, B Johnson; S Ryan, J O'Driscoll, M Kearney; M Collins, D Ryan, K Collins. Subs: R Cahill, P Walsh	
2009	Sarsfields	A Kennedy; R Ryan, J Barry, C O’Sullivan; D Kenneally, C Leahy, D Kearney; P Ryan, W Kearney; P Barry, C McCarthy, G O’Loughlin; K Murphy (c), M Cussen, T Óg Murphy. Subs: G McCarthy; G O’Kelly-Lynch; R O’Driscoll; B McCarthy	
2010	Glen Rovers	C Hickey; G Moylan, S McDonnell, S Kennefick; P O’Brien, G Callanan, B Moylan; D Cronin, D O’Callaghan; D Goggin, D Cunningham (c), D Brosnan; C Dorris, P Horgan, R Whitty. Subs: D Busteed, E Cronin	
2011	Cork Institute of Technology	K Roche; J O'Callaghan, E Dillon, B Withers; L McLoughlin (c), R Cashman, B O'Sullivan; N Kelly, M O'Sullivan; J Cronin, D Drake, A Walsh; T Quaid, S O'Brien, C Casey. Subs: P O'Connor, T Murphy, J Sheehan, K Hallissey.	
2012	Bishopstown	K O'Halloran; S O'Neill, D Lester, C O'Driscoll; B Healy, I Jones, R Ryan; K O'Driscoll, B Murray; R Conway, P Cronin, T Murray (c); D Crowley, M Power, G McGlacken. Subs: J Murphy, P Honohan, M Driscoll, D Hickey	
2013	Sarsfields	A Kennedy; R Ryan (c), J Barry, C O’Sullivan; G O’Kelly-Lynch, E Quigley, E Martin; D Kearney, E O’Sullivan; D Roche, C McCarthy, G O’Loughlin; K Murphy, R O’Driscoll, M Cussen. Subs: C Leahy; T Óg Murphy; R Murphy.	
2014	Glen Rovers	C Hickey; D Dooling, S McDonnell, G Moylan; D Noonan, B Moylan, G Callanan (c); D Cronin, C Healy; D Brosnan, D Cunningham, D Busteed; P Horgan, C Dorris, G Kennifick. Subs: B Phelan, P Virgo, S Kennifick, D Goggin, E O’Connell.	
2015	Sarsfields	A Kennedy; C O’Sullivan, C Leahy, W Kearney; D Roche, R Ryan, E Martin; D Kearney, E Quigley (c); R Murphy, C McCarthy, G O’Loughlin; E O’Sullivan, K Murphy, R O’Driscoll. Subs: T Óg Murphy, L Healy, C Duggan, P Leopold.	
2016	Erin's Own	S Bowen; C O’Connor, C Dooley, J Sheehan; C O’Mahony, S Murphy, S Cronin; A Power, S Kelly; R O’Flynn, C Coakley, K Murphy; E Murphy, M O’Carroll (c), J O’Flynn. Subs: M Collins; C O’Callaghan; S Horgan.	
2017	Blackrock	G Connolly; G Norberg, D Stokes, J Cashman; E Smith, N Cashman, A Murphy; S Murphy (c), D O’Farrell; S O’Keeffe, A O’Callaghan, G Regan; M O’Halloran, C Cormack, J O’Sullivan. Subs: D Cashman, D Meaney.	
2018	Midleton	T Wallace; E Moloney, F O’Mahoney, S Smyth; L Dineen, S O’Leary-Hayes, J Nagle; P Haughney, S O’Farrell; L O’Farrell (c), C Walsh, C Beausang; S O’Meara, C Lehane, P White. Subs: P Nagle; T O’Connell; R O’Regan.	
2019	Glen Rovers	C Hickey; S McDonnell, D Dooling, C Healy; R Downey, B Moylan (c), D Noonan; D Cronin, A O’Donovan; D Brosnan, P Horgan, D Cunningham; C Dorris, S Kennefick, L Coughlan. Subs: A Lynch, D Busteed, D Tynan.	
2020	Glen Rovers	C Hickey; D Dooling, R Downey, S McDonnell; A Lynch, B Moylan (c), D Noonan; D Cronin, A O’Donovan; M Dooley, P Horgan, D Brosnan; C Dorris, S Kennefick, L Coughlan. Subs: D Cunningham, Calvin Healy, D Tynan, L Horgan, G Kennefick, D Brosnan, D Morris.	
2021	Glen Rovers	C Hickey (c); A Lynch, S McDonnell, D Dooling; B Moylan, R Downey, E Downey; A O’Donovan, D Noonan; D Brosnan, L Horgan, M Dooley; S Kennefick, P Horgan, L Coughlan. Subs: C Dorris, C Healy, D Morris.	
2022	Blackrock	G Connolly; C O’Brien, J Cashman, S Murphy; Cathal Cormack, A O’Callaghan, N Cashman; D Meaney, M O’Keeffe; M O’Halloran, S O’Keeffe, T Deasy; K O’Keeffe, R Cotter, A Connolly. Subs: J O’Sullivan, Ciarán Cormack, D O’Farrell.	
2023	Midleton	B Saunderson; S Smyth, S O’Sullivan, S O’Leary-Hayes; E Moloney, T O’Connell, C Smyth; M Finn, P Haughney; D Cremin, C Lehane (c), R O’Regan; C Beausang, L O’Farrell, P White. Subs: P Connaughton, T O’Leary-Hayes.	
2024	Sarsfields	D McCarthy; P Leopold, C Leahy, C O’Sullivan (c); L Elliott, E Murphy, B Murphy; C Darcy, D Kearney; J O’Connor, D Hogan, A Myers; S O’Regan, J Sweeney, Colm McCarthy. Subs: Cathal McCarthy, L Healy, K Murphy.	
2025	Midleton	B Saunderson; L Dineen, S Smyth, C Smyth; T O’Leary Hayes, T O’Connell, R O’Regan; C Beausang, M Finn; C Walsh, E McGrath, A Quirke; P White, D Cremin, K McDermott. Subs: L O’Farrell, P Connaughton, S O’Meara, K Burke, P Haughney.	
2026	St Finbarr's	S Hurley; S Daly, D Cahalane, J Burns; E Finn, C Doolan, C Cahalane; C Walsh, E Twomey; J Wigginton-Barrett, B Cunningham, J O’Kelly; W Buckley, B Hayes, S Cunningham. Subs: A Barry, J Cahalane, R Barrett.	

== Individual records ==
Players who have lost the most Cork Senior Hurling Championship finals
T	Player	Team	Years lost				
T	Player	Team	Years lost	7	Pat Horgan	Glen Rovers	1975, 1977, 1978, 1980, 1981, 1988, 1991
