= John Cashman (hurler, born 1997) =

Irish hurler

Personal information
- Native name: Seán Ó Ciosáin (Irish)
- Born: 1997 (age 28–29) Blackrock, Cork, Ireland
- Occupation: Student
- Height: 5 ft 3 in (160 cm)

Sport
- Sport: Hurling
- Position: Right corner-back
Club
- Years: Club
- Blackrock
Club titles
- Cork titles: 1
College titles
- Fitzgibbon titles: 1
Inter-county*
Years	County	Apps (scores)
2018	Cork	0 (0-00)
Inter-county titles
- Munster titles: 0
- All-Irelands: 0
- NHL: 0
- All Stars: 0
- *Inter County team apps and scores correct as of 18:00, 20 March 2019.

John Cashman (born 1997) is an Irish hurler who plays for Cork Senior Championship club Blackrock. He is a former member of the Cork senior hurling team. Cashman usually lines out as a right corner-back.

== Biography ==
The Cashman family name is associated with the Blackrock club, and Cashman's father, Jim, and his uncle, Tom, won a total of six All-Ireland Championship medals between 1977 and 1990. His grandfather, Mick Cashman, and his granduncle, Jimmy Brohan, were members of Cork's three-in-a-row All-Ireland Championship-winning team between 1952 and 1954. Cashman's brother, Niall, was also a member of the Cork senior team.

== Honours ==
Blackrock

- Cork Premier Senior Hurling Championship (1): 2020
- Cork Under-21 Hurling Championship (1): 2015

Cork

- Munster Under-21 Hurling Championship (1): 2018
