= 1977 Cork Senior Hurling Championship =

Annual hurling competition season

- Dates: 1 May – 18 September 1977
- Teams: 16
- Champions: St. Finbarr's (19th title); Denis Burns (captain); Pa Finn (manager)
- Runners-up: Glen Rovers; Finbarr O'Neill (captain); Johnny Clifford (manager)

Tournament statistics
- Matches played: 15
- Goals scored: 54 (3.6 per match)
- Points scored: 334 (22.27 per match)
- Top scorer(s): Noel Crowley (2-16)

The 1977 Cork Senior Hurling Championship was the 89th staging of the Cork Senior Hurling Championship since its establishment by the Cork County Board in 1887. The draw for the opening fixtures took place on 30 January 1977. The championship began on 1 May 1977 and ended on 18 September 1977.

Glen Rovers entered the championship as the defending champions.

The final was played on 18 September 1977 at Páirc Uí Chaoimh in Cork, between St. Finbarr's and Glen Rovers, in what was their first meeting in the final in 10 years. St. Finbarr's won the match by 1–17 to 1–05 to claim their 19th championship title overall and a first title in three years. The attendance of 34,151 at the final remains a record.

Bandon's Noel Crowley was the championship's top scorer with 2–16.

== Team changes ==
=== From Championship ===
Regraded to the Cork Intermediate Hurling Championship

- Ballinhassig

== Results ==
=== First round ===
1 May 1977 First round	University College Cork	0-10 - 2-12	Avondhu	Páirc Mac Gearailt
	B Waldron 0-3, D Buckley 0-2, D Keane 0-2, T O'Sullivan 0-2, J Higgins 0-1.		D Ryan 1-2, W Shanahan 1-2, J Buckley 0-3, D O'Herlihy 0-3, P Ryan 0-1, G Madigan 0-1.	Referee: T Murphy

22 May 1977 First round	Imokilly	1-10 - 3-12	Na Piarsaigh	Riverstown
	J Fenton 0-6, M Ahern 1-1, D Buckley 0-2, T O'Sullivan 0-1.		John O'Sullivan 1-7, T Mullins 1-1, A Ahern 1-0, M McCarthy 0-2, Jim O'Sullivan 0-1, R McDonnell 0-1.	Referee: M O'Flaherty (Blackrock)

22 May 1977 First round	Mallow	1-13 - 3-15	Carrigdhoun	Riverstown
	P Buckley 0-5, J Hayes 1-0, T Sheehan 0-4, J McSweeney 0-2, K Sheehan 0-2.		F Coleman 2-3, D Coleman 0-5, D Dwyer 1-0, T Fogarty 0-2, K O'Donovan 0-2, G O'Sullivan 0-1, J Reynolds 0-1, P Harrington 0-1.	Referee: J Motherway (Aghada)

26 June 1977 First round	Nemo Rangers	1-12 - 2-10	Youghal	Castlemartyr
	N Morgan 1-2, S Coughlan 0-4, B Morgan 0-2, J O'Neill 0-1, J Barrett 0-1, D Murphy 0-1, D Calnan 0-1.		S O'Leary 0-6, N Hogan 1-1, M Butler 1-0, W Walsh 0-2, S Ring 0-1.	Referee: P Cronin

=== Second round ===
1 May 1977 Second round	Carbery	0-10 - 3-15	Bandon	Kilbrittain
	S Kearney 0-4, F O'Leary 0-2, D Noonan 0-2, P Brennan 0-1, T Crowley 0-1.		N Crowley 1-5, K O'Driscoll 1-2, G Gabriel 1-1, P Crowley 0-4, J Gabriel 0-1, T Moloney 0-1, F Crowley 0-1.	Referee: D Collins (Kinsale)

29 May 1977 Second round	Sarsfields	0-10 - 2-17	Muskerry	Páirc Uí Chaoimh
	P Fahy 0-3, M Carroll 0-2, R Fitzgerald 0-2, B Óg Murphy 0-2, E Kelleher 0-1.		T Hourihan 1-3, T Ryan 0-6, H O'Sullivan 1-1, D Desmond 0-2, S Newman 0-2, M Malone 0-2, M Buckley 0-1.	Referee: W Horgan (Brian Dillons)

26 June 1977 Second round	Avondhu	2-14 - 2-08	Carrigdhoun	Páirc Uí Chaoimh
	D Ryan 1-6, J Dillon 1-0, P Ryan 0-4, W Shanahan 0-1, G Madigan 0-1, D Herlihy 0-1, P Herlihy 0-1.		F Coleman 1-1, JK Coleman 0-4, B Coleman (Ballymartle) 1-0, T Fogarty 0-1, K O'Donovan 0-1, B Coleman (Ballinhassig) 0-1.	Referee: W Horgan (Brian Dillons)

16 July 1977 Second round	Youghal	0-14 - 0-06	Na Piarsaigh	Páirc Uí Chonaill
	S O'Leary 0-10.			Referee: P Flaherty

=== Quarter-finals ===
17 July 1977 Quarter-final	Bandon	2-14 - 4-05	Seandún	Jack Barrett Park
	N Crowley 0-7, P Crowley 1-1, N Gallagher 1-0, T Moloney 0-3, J Gabriel 0-2, F Crowley 0-1.		V Twomey 2-0, G O'Sullivan 1-1, F O'Sullivan 1-0, J Nodwell 0-2, J Crowley 0-1, W McCarthy 0-1.	Referee: D Collins (Kinsale)

17 July 1977 Quarter-final	Glen Rovers	3-13 - 1-06	Muskerry	Páirc Uí Chaoimh
	R Crowley 1-2, P O'Doherty 0-4, L McAuliffe 1-0, T Collins 1-0, P Horgan 0-4, M Ryan 0-2, D Coughlan 0-1.		T Ryan 0-5, T O'Mahony 1-0, D Desmond 0-1.	Referee: M Murphy

17 July 1977 Quarter-final	Blackrock	5-13 - 2-10	Avondhu	Páirc Uí Chaoimh
	R Cummins 2-1, T Lyons 1-2, E O'Donoghue 1-2, F Cummins 1-0, P Kavanagh 0-2, J Gorgan 0-2, D Collins 0-2, T Cashman 0-1, F Delaney 0-1.		P Ryan 0-5, P Herlihy 1-0, W Shanahan 1-0, D Ryan 0-2, D Coughlan 0-1, D Herlihy 0-1, C Brassill 0-1.	Referee: D O'Connor (Bishopstown)

31 July 1977 Quarter-final	St. Finbarr's	1-11 - 0-08	Youghal	Clonmult Memorial Park
	C Ryan 1-2, J Cremin 0-3, C McCarthy 0-2, J Allen 0-1, T Butler 0-1, E Fitzpatrick 0-1, G McCarthy 0-1.		S O'Leary 0-4, T O'Mahony 0-1, R O'Sullivan 0-1, T Kelly 0-1, T Hannon 0-1.	Referee: W Horgan (Brian Dillons)

=== Semi-finals ===
13 August 1977 Semi-final	St. Finbarr's	3-11 - 3-09	Blackrock	Páirc Uí Chaoimh
	J Barry-Murphy 3-0, J Allen 1-1, C McCarthy 0-4, T Butler 0-1.		P Moylan 1-7, É O'Donoghue 2-0, R Cummins 0-1.	Referee: W Horgan (Brian Dillons)

14 August 1977 Semi-final	Glen Rovers	4-15 - 2-09	Bandon	Páirc Uí Chaoimh
	P Horgan 1-4, T Collins 2-1, L McAuliffe 1-1, M Ryan 0-2, F Cunningham 0-2, D Coughlan 0-1, P O'Doherty 0-1, JJ O'Neill 0-1, D Clifford 0-1, F O'Sullivan 0-1.		N Crowley 1-4, N Gallagher 1-0, P Crowley 0-3, F Crowley 0-1, T Moloney 0-1.	Referee: F Murphy (Blackrock)

=== Final ===
18 September 1977 Final	St. Finbarr's	1-17 - 1-05	Glen Rovers	Páirc Uí Chaoimh
	C Ryan 1-1, J Barry-Murphy 0-4, B Wiley 0-4, C McCarthy 0-3, G McCarthy 0-2, J Allen 0-2, É Fitzpatrick 0-1.		R Crowley 1-0, M Ryan 0-3, P Horgan 0-2.	Attendance: 34,151; Referee: F Murphy (Blackrock)

== Championship statistics ==
=== Top scorers ===
Overall

Rank	Player	Club	Tally	Total	Matches	Average
1	Noel Crowley	Bandon	2-16	22	3	7.33
2	Seánie O'Leary	Youghal	0-20	20	3	6.66
3	Dave Ryan	Avondhu	2-10	16	3	5.33
4	Finbarr Coleman	Carrigdhoun	3-04	13	2	6.50
4	Jimmy Barry-Murphy	St. Finbarr's	3-04	13	3	4.33
4	Pat Horgan	Glen Rovers	1-10	13	3	4.33
7	John O'Sullivan	Na Piarsaigh	1-09	12	2	6.00
8	Éamonn O'Donoghue	Blackrock	3-02	11	2	5.50
8	Pádraig Crowley	Bandon	1-08	11	3	3.66
8	Tomás Ryan	Muskerry	0-11	11	2	5.50

In a single game

Rank	Player	Club	Tally	Total	Opposition
1	Pat Moylan	Blackrock	1-07	10	St. Finbarr's
1	John O'Sullivan	Na Piarsaigh	1-07	10	Imokilly
1	Seánie O'Leary	Youghal	0-10	10	Na Piarsaigh
4	Jimmy Barry-Murphy	St. Finbarr's	3-00	9	Blackrock
4	Finbarr Coleman	Carrigdhoun	2-03	9	Mallow
4	Dave Ryan	Avondhu	1-06	9	Carrigdhoun
7	Noel Crowley	Bandon	1-05	8	Carbery
8	Ray Cummins	Blackrock	2-01	7	Avondhu
8	Tom Collins	Glen Rovers	2-01	7	Bandon
8	Noel Crowley	Bandon	1-04	7	Glen Rovers
8	Pat Horgan	Glen Rovers	1-04	7	Bandon
8	Noel Crowley	Bandon	0-07	7	Seandún

=== Miscellaneous ===
- Patrick Murphy, the honorary secretary of the Blackrock club, collapsed and died in the stand at Páirc Uí Chaoimh while watching the championship semi-final between St. Finbarr's and Blackrock.
- The attendance of 34,151 at the county final remains an all-time record.
