= Frank O'Sullivan =

Irish hurler

Personal information
- Native name: Prionsias Ó Súilleabháin (Irish)
- Born: 1954 (age 71–72) Blackpool, Cork, Ireland

Sport
- Sport: Hurling
- Position: Goalkeeper
Club
- Years: Club
- 1973-1988: Glen Rovers
Club titles
- Cork titles: 1
- Munster titles: 1
- All-Ireland Titles: 1
Inter-county*
Years	County	Apps (scores)
1986-1987	Cork	0 (0-00)
Inter-county titles
- Munster titles: 0
- All-Irelands: 0
- NHL: 0
- All Stars: 0
- *Inter County team apps and scores correct as of 17:54, 23 May 2015.

Frank O'Sullivan (born 1954) is an Irish retired hurler who played as a goalkeeper for the Cork senior team.

Born in Blackpool, Cork, O'Sullivan first arrived on the inter-county scene at the age of seventeen when he first linked up with the Cork minor team before later joining the under-21 side. He joined the senior panel during the 1986 championship. O'Sullivan was largely an unused substitute during his career, however, he did win one All-Ireland medal and one Munster medal as a non-playing substitute.

At club level O'Sullivan is a one-time All-Ireland medallist with Glen Rovers. In addition to this he also won one Munster medals and one championship medal.

O'Sullivan's retirement came following the conclusion of the 1987 championship.

== Honours ==
Glen Rovers

- All-Ireland Senior Club Hurling Championship: 1977
- Munster Senior Club Hurling Championship: 1977
- Cork Senior Hurling Championship: 1976
- Cork Under-21 Hurling Championship: 1974
- Cork Minor Hurling Championship: 1971, 1972

Cork

- All-Ireland Senior Hurling Championship: 1986
- Munster Senior Hurling Championship: 1986
- All-Ireland Minor Hurling Championship: 1971
- All-Ireland Under-21 Hurling Championship: 1973
- Munster Under-21 Hurling Championship: 1973, 1975
- Munster Minor Hurling Championship: 1971, 1972
