= Andy Creagh =

Irish hurler and Gaelic footballer

Personal information
- Native name: Aindriú Craobhach (Irish)
- Born: 1953 Blackrock, Cork, Ireland
- Died: 10 February 2010 (aged 56) Blackrock, Cork, Ireland
- Occupation: Secondary school teacher

Sport
- Sport: Gaelic football
- Position: Midfielder
Clubs
- Years: Club
- Blackrock; St Michael's
Club titles
	Football	Hurling
Cork titles	0	6
Munster titles	0	3
All-Ireland titles	0	1
Inter-county*
Years	County	Apps (scores)
1980-1981	Cork	0 (0-00)
Inter-county titles
- Munster titles: 0
- All-Irelands: 0
- NFL: 1
- All Stars: 0
- *Inter County team apps and scores correct as of 22:01, 21 July 2014.

Andy Creagh (1953 – 10 February 2010) was an Irish hurler and Gaelic footballer who played as a midfielder for the Cork senior football team.

Born in Blackrock, Cork, Creagh first played competitive Gaelic games during his schooling at Coláiste Iognáid Rís. He arrived on the inter-county scene at the age of seventeen when he first linked up with the Cork minor hurling team, before later becoming a dual player at under-21 level. He made his senior football debut during the 1980-81 National Football League. Creagh only played for one season, winning one National Football League medal.

At club level Creagh was a one-time All-Ireland medallist with Blackrock. In addition to this he also won three Munster medals and six championship medals.

In retirement from playing Creagh became involved in team management and coaching. He coached a number of underage and juvenile teams with Blackrock over a long period.

== Honours ==
=== Team ===
Coláiste Iognáid Rís

- Simcox Cup (1): 1971
- O'Callaghan Cup (1): 1971

Blackrock

- All-Ireland Senior Club Hurling Championship (2): 1972 (sub), 1974 (sub), 1979
- Munster Senior Club Hurling Championship (3): 1971, 1973 (sub), 1975, 1978 (sub), 1979
- Cork Senior Club Hurling Championship (6): 1971, 1973, 1975, 1978, 1979, 1985 (c)

Cork

- National Football League (1): 1980-81
- All-Ireland Under-21 Hurling Championship (1): 1973 (sub)
- Munster Under-21 Hurling Championship (1): 1973 (sub)
- Munster Under-21 Football Championship (1): 1974
- All-Ireland Minor Hurling Championship (1): 1971
- Munster Minor Hurling Championship (1): 1971
