= Jerry O'Sullivan (hurler) =

Irish hurler and Gaelic footballer

Personal information
- Native name: Diarmuid Ó Súilleabháin (Irish)
- Born: 1940 Blackpool, Cork, Ireland
- Died: 22 August 1985 (aged 45) Montenotte, Cork, Ireland
- Occupation: Gaelic games coach
- Height: 5 ft 11 in (180 cm)

Sport
- Football Position: Right wing-back
- Hurling Position: Centre-back
Clubs
- Years: Club
- Glen Rovers; St. Nicholas'
Club titles
	Football	Hurling
Cork titles	2	9
Munster titles	1	3
All-Ireland titles	0	2
Inter-county
Years	County	Apps (scores)
1966-1967 1960-1970	Cork (football); Cork (hurling)	4 (0-00); 20 (0-07)
Inter-county titles
	Football	Hurling
Munster Titles	1	2
All-Ireland Titles	0	1
League titles	0	1
All-Stars	0	0

Jeremiah O'Sullivan (1940 – 22 August 1985) was an Irish hurler and Gaelic footballer. At club level he played with Glen Rovers and St. Nicholas' and was a member of the Cork senior teams in both codes.

== Playing career ==
O'Sullivan first made an impression as a schoolboy hurler at the North Monastery and in the local street leagues, before joining the Glen Rovers club. He made his first appearance for the club's senior team in 1958 and was a mainstay of the team until 1979, during which time he won two All-Ireland Club Championship titles. He also won two Cork SFC titles with sister club St. Nicholas'. O'Sullivan first appeared on the inter-county scene as a reserve with the Cork minor hurling team in 1958, the same year he won an All-Ireland JHC title. He is also a dual provincial junior championship winners. O'Sullivan made his senior team debut against Waterford during the 1959–60 National League. He was on and off the team at various times over much of the following decade and was at centre-forward when Cork beat Kilkenny in the 1966 All-Ireland hurling final. O'Sullivan also played with the Cork senior football team and was a reserve for the 1967 All-Ireland football final defeat by Meath.

== Coaching career ==
O'Sullivan became involved in coaching as his playing days with the Glen Rovers senior team were drawing to an end. He trained the club's under-21 team to the Cork U21 HC title in 1984.

== Personal life and death ==
O'Sullivan suffered a massive heart attack and died while playing a junior league match against Brian Dillons on 22 August 1985. Survived by his wife Kay and two sons, he was 45 years old.

== Honours ==
=== Player ===
Glen Rovers

- All-Ireland Senior Club Hurling Championship: 1973, 1977
- Munster Senior Club Hurling Championship: 1964, 1973, 1977
- Cork Senior Hurling Championship: 1958, 1959, 1960, 1962, 1964, 1967, 1969, 1972, 1976

St Nicholas'

- Munster Senior Club Football Championship: 1966
- Cork Senior Football Championship: 1965, 1966

Cork

- All-Ireland Senior Hurling Championship: 1966
- Munster Senior Hurling Championship: 1966, 1970
- Munster Senior Football Championship: 1966 (c), 1967
- National Hurling League: 1969-70
- All-Ireland Junior Hurling Championship: 1958
- Munster Junior Hurling Championship: 1958
- Munster Junior Football Championship: 1962, 1970

=== Coach ===
Glen Rovers

- Cork Under-21 Hurling Championship: 1984

Sporting positions
Preceded by	Cork Senior Football Captain; 1966	Succeeded by Denis Coughlan
Preceded by Jack Russell	Cork Senior Hurling Captain; 1968	Succeeded by Denis Murphy
