= Cormac Beausang =

Irish hurler

Personal information
- Native name: Cormac Beausang (Irish)
- Born: 1997 (age 28–29) Midleton, County Cork, Ireland
- Occupation: Student

Sport
- Sport: Hurling
- Position: Midfield
Club*
Years	Club	Apps (scores)
2017-present	Midleton	7 (2-17)
Club titles
- Cork titles: 0
Inter-county**
Years	County	Apps (scores)
2019-	Cork	0 (0-00)
Inter-county titles
- Munster titles: 0
- All-Irelands: 0
- NHL: 0
- All Stars: 0
- * club appearances and scores correct as of 13:25, 23 February 2019. **Inter County team apps and scores correct as of 13:25, 23 February 2019.

Cormac Beausang (born 1997) is an Irish hurler who plays for Cork Senior Championship club Midleton and at inter-county level with the Cork senior hurling team. He usually lines out at midfield.

== Playing career ==
=== Midleton ===
Beausang joined the Midleton club at a young age and played in all grades at juvenile and underage levels. On 8 December 2018, he scored two points from midfield when Midleton suffered a 3–24 to 4–18 defeat by Fr. O'Neill's in the final of the Premier Under-21 Championship.

On 25 June 2017, Beausang made his first senior championship appearance for the club in a 2–25 to 4–15 defeat of Erin's Own.

=== Cork ===
==== Minor ====
Beausang first lined out for Cork as a member of the minor team during the 2015 Munster Championship. He was a member of the extended panel throughout the championship and saw no game time.

==== Senior ====
Beausang made his first appearance for the Cork senior team on 2 January 2019 when he was introduced as a 25th-minute substitute for Robbie O'Flynn in a 1–24 to 1–18 defeat by Waterford in the Munster Senior League. On 5 January, he scored a point from left corner-forward when Cork defeated University College Cork to win the Canon O'Brien Cup. Beausang was added to the Cork senior hurling team for their National Hurling League game against Limerick on 24 February.

== Career statistics ==
=== Club ===
As of match played 28 October 2018.

Team	Season	Cork		Munster		All-Ireland		Total	
Team	Season	Apps	Score	Apps	Score	Apps	Score	Apps	Score
Midleton	2017-18	1	0-03	—		—		1	0-03
Midleton	2018-19	5	1-12	1	1-02	—		6	2-14
Career total		6	1-15	1	1-02	—		7	2-17

=== Inter-county ===
Team	Year	National League			Munster		All-Ireland		Total	
Team	Year	Division	Apps	Score	Apps	Score	Apps	Score	Apps	Score
Cork	2019	Division 1A	0	0-00	0	0-00	0	0-00	0	0-00
Career total			0	0-00	0	0-00	0	0-00	0	0-00

== Honours ==
Cork

- Canon O'Brien Cup (1): 2019
