= Denis O'Riordan =

Irish hurler

Personal information
- Native name: Donncha Ó Riordáin (Irish)
- Born: 1941 (age 84–85) Ballincollig, County Cork, Ireland
- Height: 5 ft 10 in (178 cm)

Sport
- Sport: Hurling
- Position: Centre-back
Clubs
- Years: Club
- 1958-1960 1961-1973: Ballincollig; Glen Rovers; St. Nicholas
Club titles
- Cork titles: 5
- Munster titles: 2
- All-Ireland Titles: 1
Inter-county*
Years	County	Apps (scores)
1960-1969	Cork	20 (0-00)
Inter-county titles
- Munster titles: 1
- All-Irelands: 1
- NHL: 0
- *Inter County team apps and scores correct as of 17:02, 18 April 2015.

Denis O'Riordan (born 1941) is an Irish former hurler who played as a centre-back and full back at senior level for the Cork county team.

== Career ==
Born in Ballincollig, County Cork, He started his sporting career as a minor with Ballincollig and senior with Muskerry (divisional Club). He subsequently moved to the Glen Rovers in 1958. O'Riordan first arrived on the inter-county scene at the young age of seventeen when he first linked up with the Cork minor team. He made his senior debut during the 1960 championship. O'Riordan immediately became a regular member of the starting fifteen and won one Munster medal in 1966 in Limerick. This cork team went on to win the 1966 All Ireland senior hurling championship on the second Sunday of September.

As a member of the Munster inter-provincial team on a number of occasions, O'Riordan won three Railway Cup medal. At club level he has two All-Ireland medallist with Glen Rovers. In addition to this he has also won two Munster medal and five championship medals. He began his career with Ballincollig and following his senior debut for muskerry he moved to Glen Rovers and played Gaelic football with St. Nicholas' and has 2 county senior football medals.

He holds the crown of Corks first Cú Chulainn Award holder (Pre all stars) in 1965 and captained cork in 1967. Throughout his career O Riordan made over 20 championship appearances including the infamous match in newross. His county retirement came following the conclusion of the 1969 championship but played for the Glen until 1970.

== Honours ==
Glen Rovers

- All-Ireland Senior Club Hurling Championship: 1973
- Munster Senior Club Hurling Championship: 1964, 1972
- Cork Senior Hurling Championship: 1962, 1964, 1967, 1969, 1972

Cork

- All-Ireland Senior Hurling Championship: 1966
- Munster Senior Hurling Championship: 1966

Sporting positions
Preceded by John O'Halloran	Cork senior hurling team captain 1965	Succeeded by Peter Doolan
