= Bríon Saunderson =

Irish hurler (born 2003)

Personal information
- Native name: Bríon Mac Sandair (Irish)
- Born: 2003 (age 22–23) Midleton, County Cork, Ireland
- Height: 21 ft 1 in (643 cm)

Sport
- Sport: Hurling
- Position: Goalkeeper
Club*
Years	Club	Apps (scores)
2021–	Midleton	18 (0–4)
Club titles
- Cork titles: 1
College
- Years: College
- 2021–2024: University College Cork
College titles
- Fitzgibbon titles: 0
Inter-county
- Years: County
- 2024–: Cork
Inter-county titles
- Munster titles: 1
- All-Irelands: 0
- NHL: 1
- All Stars: 0
- * club appearances and scores correct as of 20:31, 14 January 2024.

Bríon Saunderson (born 2003) is an Irish hurler. At club level, he plays with Midleton and at inter-county level with the Cork senior team.

== Career ==
Saunderson first played hurling at juvenile and underage levels with the Midleton club. He later played as a schoolboy with Midleton CBS Secondary School in the Harty Cup before attending University College Cork (UCC). Saunderson was part of the UCC team that won the Canon O'Brien Cup in 2024.

After progressing from the underage grades, Saunderson first played at adult club level with Midleton as goalkeeper with the senior team in 2021. He won a Cork PSHC medal in his debut season as Midleton beat Glen Rovers in the final.

Saunderson first appeared for Cork during a two-year stint as goalkeeper with the minor team in 2019 and 2020. He later spent two years with the under-20 team, culminating with a defeat of Offaly in the 2023 All-Ireland under-20 final. Saunderson was drafted onto the senior team following this victory and made his debut in the pre-season Munster SHL in 2024. He was sub-goalkeeper to Patrick Collins for Cork's 3–29 to 1–34 extra-time defeat by Clare in the 2024 All-Ireland final.

Saunderson claimed his first senior silverware in April 2025 when he was a substitute when Cork won the National Hurling League title following a 3–24 to 0–23 win over Tipperary in the final. This was later followed by a Munster SHC medal, again as sub-goalkeeper, after Cork's penalty shootout defeat of Limerick in the 2025 Munster final.

== Career statistics ==
=== Club ===
As of 6 October 2024.

Team	Year	Cork		Munster		All-Ireland		Total	
Team	Year	Apps	Score	Apps	Score	Apps	Score	Apps	Score
Midleton	2021	6	0–0	1	0–0	—		7	0–0
Midleton	2022	3	0–0	—		—		3	0–0
Midleton	2023	3	0–1	—		—		3	0–1
Midleton	2024	5	0–3	—		—		5	0–3
Total		17	0–4	1	0–0	—		18	0–4

=== Inter-county ===
As of 7 June 2025.

Team	Year	National League			Munster		All-Ireland		Total	
Team	Year	Division	Apps	Score	Apps	Score	Apps	Score	Apps	Score
Cork	2024	Division 1A	1	0–0	0	0–0	0	0–0	1	0–0
Cork	2025	Division 1A	1	0–0	0	0–0	0	0–0	1	0–0
Career total			2	0–0	0	0–0	0	0–0	2	0–0

== Honours ==
Midleton CBS

- Dr O'Callaghan Cup: 2020

University College Cork

- Canon O'Brien Cup: 2024

Midleton

- Cork Premier Senior Hurling Championship: 2021

Cork

- Munster Senior Hurling Championship: 2025
- National Hurling League: 2025
- All-Ireland Under-20 Hurling Championship: 2023
- Munster Under-20 Hurling Championship: 2023
