= 1969 Cork Senior Hurling Championship =

Annual hurling competition season

- Dates: 13 April - 21 September 1969
- Teams: 15
- Champions: Glen Rovers (22nd title); Denis O'Riordan (captain)
- Runners-up: University College Cork; Paddy Crowley (captain)

Tournament statistics
- Matches played: 14
- Goals scored: 78 (5.57 per match)
- Points scored: 242 (17.29 per match)
- Top scorer(s): Mick Kenneally (6-03)

The 1969 Cork Senior Hurling Championship was the 81st staging of the Cork Senior Hurling Championship since its establishment by the Cork County Board in 1887. The championship began on 13 April 1969 and ended on 21 September 1969.

St. Finbarr's entered the championship as the defending champions, however, they were beaten by University College Cork in the quarter-finals.

The final was played on 21 September 1969 at the Athletic Grounds in Cork between Glen Rovers and University College Cork, in what was their first meeting in a final in seven years. Glen Rovers won the match by 4–16 to 1–13 to claim their 22nd championship title overall and their first title since 1967.

== Team changes ==
=== To Championship ===
Promoted from the Cork Intermediate Hurling Championship

- St. Vincent's

== Results ==
=== First round ===
13 April 1969 First round	Duhallow	1-09 - 2-09	Avondhu	Buttevant Sportsfield
	B Buckley 1-7, S Stokes 0-1, D Murphy 0-1.		F Sheedy 1-1, D Keating 1-0, R Browne 0-2, L Sheehan 0-2, P Behan 0-1, T McNamara 0-1, D Ahern 0-1, C Morrissey 0-1.

20 April 1969 First round	Carbery	2-02 - 2-07	Sarsfields	Kinsale Sportsfield
	J Kirby 1-0, J Crowley 1-0, F Crowley 0-1, T Hayes 0-1.		M Holland 1-2, M Kearney 1-0, JJ Long 0-2, S Riordan 0-1, R O'Rahilly 0-1, M Kearney 0-1.

27 April 1969 First round	Blackrock	5-09 - 3-04	Seandún	Cork Athletic Grounds
	D McCarthy 3-0, P Moylan 1-2, N O'Keeffe 0-5, K Cummins 1-1, J O'Leary 0-1.		J O'Sullivan 1-1, J O'Shea 1-0, A Murphy 1-0, T O'Neill 0-2, J O'Sullivan 0-1.

27 April 1969 First round	Glen Rovers	4-11 - 2-06	Carrigdhoun	UCC Sportsgrounds
	M Kenneally 2-1, S Kennefick 1-2, L McAuliffe 1-1, W Carroll 0-2, T Corbett 0-2, P Harte 0-1, J Young 0-1, J Daly 0-1.		D Coleman 2-0, JK Coleman 0-4, F Coleman 0-1, D Walsh 0-1.

16 May 1969 First round	Muskerry	3-06 - 1-08	Imokilly	Cork Athletic Grounds
	C Kelly 2-1, T Ryan 0-5, J Helay 1-0.		T Browne 0-4, J Ahern 1-0, P Hegarty 0-2, T Meaney 0-1, P Fitzgerald 0-1.

25 May 1969 First round	Na Piarsaigh	3-05 - 3-11	St. Finbarr's	UCC Sportsgrounds
	L Joyce 1-1, S Twomey 0-4, N Geaney 1-0, P Allen 1-0.		C McCarthy 2-3, C Cullinane 1-0, C Roche 0-3, S Gillen 0-2, M Archer 0-1, G McCarthy 0-1.

22 June 1969 First round	University College Cork	6-11 - 1-08	St. Vincent's	Cork Athletic Grounds
	J O'Halloran 3-1, T Buckley 1-3, W Moore 1-1, D Motherway 1-1, N Dunne 0-2, N Morgan 0-1, M Murphy 0-1, D McDonnell 0-1.		D O'Regan 1-0, N Barry 0-3, C O'Shea 0-2, B O'Neill 0-1.

- Passage received a bye in this round.

=== Quarter-finals ===
6 July 1969 Quarter-final	Passage	1-06 - 4-10	Muskerry	Ballinhassig Sportsfield
	B Meade 1-1, J Murphy 0-2, E O'Brien 0-2, T O'Shea 0-1.		T Ryan 1-5, M Ryan 1-2, S Coakley 1-0, C Kelly 1-0, T Mahony 0-1, J Sheedy 0-1.

6 July 1969 Quarter-final	Blackrock	5-15 - 2-03	Sarsfields	Cork Athletic Grounds
	J Bennett 2-2, J Russell 1-2, N O'Keeffe 0-5, P Kavanagh 1-1, P Moylan 0-4, B Cummins 1-0, F Norberg 0-1.		S O'Riordan 1-1, D O'Connell 1-1, JJ Long 0-1.

13 July 1969 Quarter-final	University College Cork	4-11 - 4-10	St. Finbarr's	Cork Athletic Grounds
	R Cummins 2-2, T Buckley 0-4, J O'Halloran 1-0, N Morgan 1-0, D Clifford 0-2, M Murphy 0-1, N Dunne 0-1, J Barrett 0-1.		C McCarthy 1-4, M Archer 1-2, C Cullinane 1-2, G McCarthy 1-1, S Gillen 0-2.	Referee: M Walsh (Mayfield)

13 July 1969 Quarter-final	Glen Rovers	2-10 - 2-06	Avondhu	Páirc Mac Gearailt
	P Harte 1-4, J Young 1-2, J Daly 0-1, K Houlihan 0-1, D Coughlan 0-1, S Kennefick 0-1.		R Browne 2-0, F Sheedy 0-3, L Sheehan 0-2, K Casey 0-1.

=== Semi-finals ===
24 August 1969 Semi-final	Glen Rovers	4-08 - 1-10	Blackrock	Cork Athletic Grounds
	M Kenneally 2-1, T O'Brien 1-1, L McAuliffe 1-1, P Harte 0-2, D Coughlan 0-1, B O'Connell 0-1, J Young 0-1.		J Russell 1-3, N O'Keeffe 0-4, B Cummins 0-2, P Moylan 0-1.

24 August 1969 Semi-final	University College Cork	3-11 - 2-07	Muskerry	Charlie Hurley Park
	N Morgan 2-1, R Cummins 1-1, N Dunne 0-4, T Buckley 0-2, J O'Halloran 0-2, J Barrett 0-1.		T Ryan 0-5, J Coakley 1-1, C Sheehan 1-0, M Malone 0-1.

=== Final ===
21 September 1969 Final	Glen Rovers	4-16 - 1-13	University College Cork	Cork Athletic Grounds
	P Harte 1-6, M Kenneally 2-1, J Daly 1-2, W Carroll 0-4, S O'Riordan 0-1, S Kennefick 0-1, T O'Brien 0-1.		M Murphy 1-2, R Cummins 0-3, T Buckley 0-3, J O'Halloran 0-1, D Clifford 0-1, D Motherway 0-1, S Looney 0-1, P Kilkenny 0-1.	Attendance: 17,824

== Championship statistics ==
=== Top scorers ===
Top scorers overall

Rank	Player	County	Tally	Total	Matches	Average
1	Mick Kenneally	Glen Rovers	6-03	21	4	5.25
2	Patsy Harte	Glen Rovers	2-13	19	4	4.75
3	Tomás Ryan	Muskerry	1-15	18	3	6.00
4	John O'Halloran	UCC	4-04	16	4	4.00
4	Charlie McCarthy	St. Finbarr's	3-07	16	2	8.00
