= Francis Collins (hurler) =

Irish Gaelic footballer

Personal information
- Native name: Prionsias Ó Coileáin (Irish)
- Born: Castlehaven, County Cork, Ireland

Sport
- Sport: Hurling
- Position: Midfield
Clubs
- Years: Club
- Castlehaven; Blackrock
Club titles
	Football	Hurling
Cork titles	1	1
Munster titles	1	0
Inter-county*
Years	County	Apps (scores)
1982-1983	Cork	4 (0-00)
Inter-county titles
- Munster titles: 0
- All-Irelands: 0
- NHL: 0
- All Stars: 0
- *Inter County team apps and scores correct as of 13:21, 29 July 2015.

Francis Collins is an Irish retired hurler who played as a midfielder for the Cork senior team.

Born in Castlehaven, County Cork, Collins first played competitive Gaelic games during his schooling at the St. Finbarr's College. He arrived on the inter-county scene when he first linked up with the Cork senior team. He made his debut during the 1982 championship. Collins quickly became a regular member of the starting fifteen. He was an All-Ireland runner-up on two occasions.

At club level Collins is a one-time Munster medallist as a Gaelic footballer with Castlehaven. In addition to this he is also a dual championship medallist having played hurling with Blackrock.

Collin's brothers, Donie and Christy, also played with Cork.

Throughout his career Collins made 4 championship appearances. His retirement came following the conclusion of the 1983 championship.

== Honours ==
=== Player ===
Blackrock

- Cork Senior Club Hurling Championship (1): 1985

Castlehaven

- Munster Senior Club Football Championship (1): 1989
- Cork Senior Club Football Championship (1): 1989

Cork

- Munster Senior Hurling Championship (2): 1982 (sub), 1983 (sub)
