= Peter Doolan =

Irish hurler (born 1940)

Personal information
- Native name: Peadar Ó Dúlainn (Irish)
- Born: 1940 (age 85–86) Cork, Ireland
- Height: 5 ft 9 in (175 cm)

Sport
- Sport: Hurling
- Position: Left corner-back
Club
- Years: Club
- St Finbarr's
Club titles
- Cork titles: 2
- Munster titles: 1
Inter-county
Years	County	Apps (scores)
1963-1968	Cork	15 (0-00)
Inter-county titles
- Munster titles: 1
- All-Irelands: 1
- NHL: 0

Peter Doolan (born 1940 in Cork, Ireland) is an Irish former sportsperson. He played hurling with his local club St Finbarr's and was a member at senior level of the Cork county team from 1962 until 1968.

== Playing career ==
=== Club ===
Doolan played his club hurling with the St Finbarr's club on the southside of Cork city and had much success. He won his first county senior championship winners' medal in 1965 following 'the Barr's' 6-8 to 2-5 defeat of UCC. The club later represented Cork in the provincial club series and een reached the final. A 3-12 to 2-3 defeat of Waterford's Mount Sion gave Doolan a Munster club winners' medal.

After St Finbarr's lost the 1967 county final to Glen Rovers, the club recovered to reach the championship decider again the following year. A remarkable 5-9 to 1-9 defeat of divisional side Imokilly gave Doolan a second county championship title.

=== Inter-county ===
Doolan first came to prominence on the inter-county scene as a member of the Cork minor hurling team in 1958. After an unsuccessful stint with the minors, Doolan made his senior debut for Cork in a National Hurling League game against Tipperary in 1963. He made his championship debut the following year, however, Cork had been in the doldrums since their All-Ireland defeat of 1956.

After losing back-to-back Munster finals to Tipperray in 1964 and 1965, Cork hurling returned to centre stage in 1966. That year Doolan's side avoided Tipperary in the provincial championship and qualified for a Munster showdown with Waterford. An entertaining hour of hurling followed, however, victory went to Cork by 4-9 to 2-9 for the first time in ten years. It was Doolan's first senior Munster winners' medal. This victory allowed Cork to advance directly to the All-Ireland final where arch-rivals Kilkenny provided the opposition. It was the first meeting of these two great sides since 1947 and ‘the Cats’ were installed as the firm favourites. In spite of this a hat-trick of goals by Colm Sheehan gave Cork a merited 3-9 to 1-10 victory over an Eddie Keher-inspired Kilkenny. It was Doolan's first All-Ireland winners' medal.

Cork failed to retain their provincial and All-Ireland titles in 1967 while Tipperary trounced Cork by nine points in the Munster final a year later. Doolan left the Cork team following this defeat.

=== Inter-provincial ===
Doolan also had the honour of lining out with Munster in the inter-provincial hurling competition and had some success. He first lined out with his province in 1967, however, Munster were defeated by Leinster on that occasion. Doolan was listed on the Munster team again in 1968. That year his province turned the tables on Leinster and a 0-14 to 0-10 victory gave Doolan a Railway Cup winners' medal.

Sporting positions
Preceded by Denis O'Riordan	Cork Senior Hurling Captain; 1966	Succeeded by Gerald McCarthy
