= Canon O'Brien Cup =

Annual hurling match contested by Cork and UCC

- Irish: Corn Uí Bhriain
- Code: Hurling
- Founded: 2013; 13 years ago
- Region: Cork (GAA)
- Trophy: Canon O'Brien Cup
- No. of teams: 2
- Title holders: University College Cork (2nd title)
- First winner: Cork
- Most titles: Cork (5 titles)

The Canon O'Brien Cup is an annual hurling match contested by Cork and University College Cork. The match, usually played in January at the Mardyke Sports Ground, is often regarded as a pre-season warm-up game for the two participants.

Organised by the Cork County Board, admission to the match is free; however, those attending the game are asked to make a donation to volunteer collectors on the day, with all proceeds going to the Irish Alzheimer's Society. The fixture was first played in 2013.

The current holders (2020) are University College Cork.

== History ==
The Canon O'Brien Cup was launched in 2013 by GAA President Liam O'Neill. The Cup was planned to be an annual challenge match between Cork and University College Cork. Canon Michael O'Brien, who was heavily involved as a coach with both teams, led UCC to eight consecutive Fitzgibbon Cup titles between 1981 and 1988 and led Cork to the 1990 All-Ireland title.

== Cup ==
The cup was donated by the O’Brien family and is a replica of the Fitzgibbon Cup. It was presented to Canon O'Brien in 1983 by the UCC hurling squad after he had helped them to win three Fitzgibbon Cup titles in-a-row.

== List of finals ==
Year	Winners	Score	Runners-up	Score	Venue	Winning Captain	Winning team
2013	Cork	3-20	University College Cork	1-16	The Mardyke	Pa Cronin	A Nash; S O'Neill, C Spillane, S McDonnell; T Kenny, C Joyce, S White; D Kearney, P Cronin; B Corry, C McCarthy, S Moylan; P Horgan, M Cussen, P O'Sullivan. Subs: R O'Shea, M O'Sullivan.
2014	Cork	2-19	University College Cork	1-14	The Mardyke	Anthony Nash	A Nash; C Joyce, S O’Neill, K Murphy; E Keane, M Ellis, W Egan; P Haughney, L McLoughlin; B Lawton, C McCarthy, M O’Sullivan; S Moylan, P Horgan, J Coughlan. Subs: L O’Farrell, D Kearney, S White, A Ryan, S O’Farrell.
2015	Cork	1-26	University College Cork	2-12	The Mardyke	Anthony Nash	A Nash; C Joyce, C Barry, W Kearney; A Walsh, L McLoughlin, C Murphy; D Kearney, P Cronin; S Harnedy, B Cooper, B Lawton; D McCarthy, P O’Sullivan, P Horgan. Subs: C McCarthy, S Moylan, W Kearney, L O’Farrell, P Haughney.
2016	Cork	2-12	University College Cork	0-13	The Mardyke	Shane O'Neill	A Nash; C O’Sullivan, P O’Mahony, A Dennehy; S O’Neill, W Egan, N Cashman; P Haughney, D Kearney; P O’Sullivan, W Leahy, S Moylan; L Meade, P Cronin, D Lee. Subs: D Browne, D Fitzgibbon, M Coleman, C Buckley.
2017	University College Cork	0-22	Cork	1-13	The Mardyke		D Desmond; I Kenny, C Spillane, S Roche; N Motherway, C Gleeson, R Cahalane; J Barron, R O’Shea; M O’Brien, B McCarthy, S Hegarty; A Cadogan, J O’Flynn, A Spillane. Subs: J Barry, G O’Brien, D Hannon, N Cashman, C Browne, D O’Brien, B O’Sullivan.
2018	No competition						
2019	Cork	1-24	University College Cork	1-23	The Mardyke		P Collins; S O’Donoghue, D Cahalane, C O’Callaghan; C Joyce, P Leopold, W Kearney; D Kearney, C Murphy; S Kennefick, P Horgan, C Walsh; J Coughlan, D Dalton, C Beausang. Subs: R Downey, S Condon, T O’Connell, C Power, C O’Brien.
2020	University College Cork	2-18	Cork	1-20	The Mardyke	Eoghan Murphy	S Hurley; D Lowney, E Murphy, S Roche; B Hennessy, N O’Leary, P O’Loughlin; A Casey, R Connolly; D Fitzgibbon, S Kingston, C Boylan; J O’Sullivan, S Conway, M O’Halloran. Subs: J Cashman, S Roche, N Montgomery, B Sheehan, S Hayes, W Henn.
2021	No competition						
2022	Cork	1-17	University College Cork	1-15	The Mardyke		G Collins; D Cahalane, G Millerick, S O'Donoghue; J O'Flynn, M Coleman, T O'Mahony; D Fitzgibbon, C Joyce; M Keane, S Harnedy, C Lehane; S Kingston, A Cadogan, L Meade. Subs: P Power, R O'Flynn, C O'Brien, S Twomey, L Meade.
2023	Cork	0-25	University College Cork	1-15	The Mardyke		G Connolly; C O’Callaghan, S O’Leary-Hayes, S O’Donoghue; E Downey, T O’Connell, R Downey; S Quirke, B O’Sullivan; B Keating, C Lehane, L Meade; C Walsh, D Dalton, B Hayes. Subs: D Harrington, A Walsh-Barry, D Healy, M Kelly, K Moynihan, J Cashman, J O’Carroll, A Myers.

== Records ==
=== Scoring ===
All time top scorers

Rank	Player	Team	Scores	Tally	Games	Era	Average
1	Patrick Horgan	Cork	3-23	32	3	2013-2015	10.66
2	Willie Griffin	U.C.C.	2-15	21	2	2013-2014	10.50
3	Paudie O'Sullivan	Cork	3-07	16	3	2013-2016	5.33
4	Rob O'Shea	Cork; U.C.C.	0-13	13	5	2013-present	2.60
5	Stephen Moylan	Cork	1-09	12	4	2013-2016	3.00
6	Anthony Spillane	U.C.C.	1-06	9	3	2015-present	3.00
7	Paul Haughney	Cork	0-08	8	4	2014-2016	2.00
8	Conor Lehane	Cork; U.C.C.	0-07	7	2	2013-present	3.50
9	Séamus Harnedy	Cork; U.C.C.	0-05	5	2	2013-2015	2.50
9	Cian McCarthy	Cork	0-05	5	4	2013-2016	1.20

Top scorers in a single game

Season	Top scorer	Team	Score	Total
2013	Patrick Horgan	Cork	2-08	16
2014	Patrick Horgan	Cork	1-09	12
2015	Anthony Spillane	U.C.C.	1-04	7
2016	Paudie O'Sullivan	Cork	1-04	7
2016	Rob O'Shea	U.C.C.	0-7	7
2017	Alan Cadogan	U.C.C.	0-07	7
2018				
2019	Patrick Horgan	Cork	0-09	9

=== Miscellaneous ===
- Daniel Kearney of Cork holds the record for playing in five Canon O'Brien Cup-winning teams.
- Colm Spillane won Canon O'Brien Cup titles as a member of both the Cork (2013) and University College Cork (2017) teams.
