= John Buckley (Glen Rovers hurler) =

Irish former sportsperson (born 1958)

Personal information
- Native name: Seán Ó Buachalla (Irish)
- Nickname: Bucks
- Born: 2 June 1958 (age 68) Ballyvolane, Cork, Ireland
- Occupation: Sales representative
- Height: 6 ft 2 in (188 cm)

Sport
- Sport: Hurling
- Position: Midfield
Club
- Years: Club
- 1979-1991: Glen Rovers
Club titles
- Cork titles: 1
Inter-county
Years	County	Apps (scores)
1982-1986	Cork	12 (0-09)
Inter-county titles
- Munster titles: 5
- All-Irelands: 1
- NHL: 0
- All Stars: 0

John Buckley (born 2 June 1958) is an Irish former hurler. At club level, he played with Glen Rovers and at inter-county level with the Cork senior hurling team.

== Career ==
Buckley first played hurling to a high standard as a student at the North Monastery. At club level, he first played for Glen Rovers at juvenile and underage levels, while he also played Gaelic football with sister club St Nicholas'. Buckley won a Cork MHC-MFC double in 1976. After progressing to adult level, again as a dual player, he later concentrated solely on hurling. Buckley won a Cork SHC medal in 1989, after the Glen's 4–15 to 3–13 defeat of Sarsfields in the final.

At inter-county level, Buckley first played for Cork as part of the under-21 team beaten by Down in the 1979 All-Ireland U21FC final. He subsequently switched codes and was drafted onto the Cork senior hurling team in 1982. Buckley won five consecutive Munster SHC medals between his debut season and 1986. He was also an unused substitute when Cork beat Offaly in the 1984 All-Ireland final. Buckley played his last game for Cork in 1986.

== Honours ==
St Nicholas'

- Cork Minor Football Championship: 1976

Glen Rovers

- Cork Senior Hurling Championship: 1989
- Cork Minor Hurling Championship: 1976

Cork

- All-Ireland Senior Hurling Championship: 1984
- Munster Senior Hurling Championship: 1982, 1983, 1984, 1985, 1986
- Munster Under-21 Football Championship: 1979
