= Killian Cronin =

Irish hurler

Personal information
- Native name: Cillian Ó Cróinín (Irish)
- Born: October 1978 (age 48) Cloyne, County Cork, Ireland

Sport
- Sport: Hurling
- Position: Full-back
Club
- Years: Club
- Cloyne
Club titles
- Cork titles: 0
Inter-county*
Years	County	Apps (scores)
2006-2009	Cork	0 (0-00)
Inter-county titles
- Munster titles: 0
- All-Irelands: 0
- NHL: 0
- All Stars: 0
- *Inter County team apps and scores correct as of 23:43, 28 July 2014.

Killian Cronin (born October 1978) is an Irish hurler who played as a full-back for the Cork senior team.

Born in Cloyne, County Cork, Cronin first arrived on the inter-county scene at the age of twenty-five when he first linked up with the Cork senior team. Cronin was a member of the extended panel for a number of years and won one Munster medal as a non-playing substitute.

At club level Cronin plays with Cloyne.

== Honours ==
=== Team ===
Cork

- Munster Senior Hurling Championship (1): 2006 (sub)
