= Paddy Crowley =

Irish retired hurler

Personal information
- Native name: Pádraig Ó Crualaoich (Irish)
- Born: 1947 (age 78–79) Newcestown, County Cork, Ireland
- Occupation: Medical doctor

Sport
- Sport: Hurling
- Position: Centre-back
Clubs
- Years: Club
- Newcestown; Carbery
Club titles
- Cork titles: 0
Inter-county*
Years	County	Apps (scores)
1971-1972	Cork	5 (0-00)
Inter-county titles
- Munster titles: 1
- All-Irelands: 0
- NHL: 1
- All Stars: 0
- *Inter County team apps and scores correct as of 22:03, 15 April 2019.

Patrick Crowley (born 1947) is an Irish retired hurler who played for Cork Championship club Newcestown and divisional side Carbery. He played for the Cork senior hurling team for two seasons, during which time he usually lined out as a right wing-back.

Crowley began his hurling career at club level with Newcestown. He broke onto the club's top adult team in the mid-1960s and enjoyed his first success in 1972 when the club won the Cork Junior Championship. Crowley won a second Cork Junior Championship medal in 1980. He made numerous championship appearances in two different grades of hurling for the club, while his early prowess also saw him selected for the Carbery divisional team.

At inter-county level, Crowley first came to prominence at midfield on the Cork minor team during the 1965 Munster Championship. After failing to secure a place on the Cork under-21 team, he joined the Cork senior team in 1971. Crowley was a regular member of the team for two seasons and played his last game in 1972. During that time he was part of the 1972 Munster Championship-winning team. Crowley also won a National Hurling League medal in 1972.

== Honours ==
St Finbarr's College

- Dr. Croke Cup: 1963
- Dr. Harty Cup: 1963

Newcestown

- Cork Junior Hurling Championship (2): 1972, 1980
- South West Junior A Hurling Championship (5): 1967, 1969, 1972, 1979, 1980

Cork

- Munster Senior Hurling Championship (1): 1972
- National Hurling League (1): 1971-72
