= Leonard Forde =

Irish hurler

Personal information
- Native name: Lionard Mac Giollarnáth (Irish)
- Born: 1973 (age 52–53) Gurranabraher, Cork, Ireland

Sport
- Sport: Hurling
- Position: Centre-back
Club
- Years: Club
- Na Piarsaigh
Inter-county
Years	County	Apps (scores)
1990-1995	Cork	1 (0-00)
Inter-county titles
- Munster titles: 0
- All-Irelands: 0
- NHL: 1
- All Stars: 0

Leonard Forde (born 1964) is an Irish retired hurler. At club level, he played with Na Piarsaigh and at inter-county level he lined out with the Cork senior hurling team.

== Career ==
Forde first played for Na Piarsaigh as a dual player at juvenile and underage levels and won a Cork MHC medal in 1982 after a 1–10 to 0–08 win over Midleton in the final. He later progressed to adult level and won a Cork SHC medal in 1990 after Na Piarsaigh's 2–07 to 1–08 win over St Finbarr's in the final. Forde claimed a second winners' medal in 1995 after captaining the team to a 1–12 to 3–01 defeat of Ballyhea in the final.

At inter-county level, Forde first played for Cork as a member of the senior team in 1990. He won a National Hurling League title in 1993, in spite of being sent off in the 3–11 to 1–12 win over Wexford. Forde continues to line out with the senior team until 1995.

== Honours ==
Na Piarsaigh

- Cork Senior Hurling Championship: 1990, 1995 (c)
- Cork Minor Hurling Championship: 1982

Cork

- National Hurling League: 1992–93
