= Conor Cusack =

Irish sportsperson

Personal information
- Native name: Conchuir Ó Cíosóg (Irish)
- Born: 16 January 1979 (age 47) Cork, Ireland
- Height: 1.9 m (6 ft 3 in)

Sport
- Sport: Hurling
- Position: Left corner forward
Club
- Years: Club
- Cloyne
Inter-county
- Years: County
- 2006-2007: Cork
Inter-county titles
- Munster titles: 0
- All-Irelands: 0
- NHL: 0
- All Stars: 0

Conor Cusack (born 16 January 1979) is an Irish sportsperson. He played hurling with the Cork senior inter-county team in 2006. Known nationally in Ireland for his mental health advocacy, Cusack continues to play hurling with his local Cloyne club.

== Early life ==
Cusack was born in Cloyne, County Cork in 1979. He was educated locally and currently works as an apprentice electrician. His brother, Donal Óg, is also a hurler as was a cousin, Christy Ring.

== Sporting career ==
Cusack was noted as a good hurler from an early age. He plays with his local Cloyne GAA club and was a member of the Cork senior hurling panel for several years. His brother, Donal Óg, was the goalkeeper on the team.

Cusack made his debut in the 2006 All-Ireland Senior Hurling Championship Final against Kilkenny, coming on as a substitute in the closing minutes.

== Personal life ==
Cusack devotes much of his time to highlighting mental health and articulating his own experiences of depression. He has spoken about this on national television, on Prime Time. In January 2014, Cusack for the first time publicly discussed his attraction to men. Ahead of the 2015 Marriage Equality referendum, he spoke on The Saturday Night Show in favour of the proposition and challenged those who opposed it.
