= Denis Burns =

Irish hurler and manager

Personal information
- Native name: Donncha Ó Broin (Irish)
- Born: 1952 (age 73–74) Cork, Ireland
- Occupation: University lecturer

Sport
- Sport: Hurling
- Position: Right corner-back
Club
- Years: Club
- St Finbarr's
Club titles
- Cork titles: 5
- Munster titles: 3
- All-Ireland Titles: 1
Inter-county*
Years	County	Apps (scores)
1974-1980	Cork	26 (0-00)
Inter-county titles
- Munster titles: 5
- All-Irelands: 3
- NHL: 1
- All Stars: 0
- *Inter County team apps and scores correct as of 20:52, 21 June 2016.

Denis Gerard Burns (born 1952) is an Irish former hurling manager and player who played as a right corner-back at senior level for the Cork county team.

Born in Cork, Burns was introduced to hurling in his youth before later coming to prominence at underage levels with the St Finbarr's club. An All-Ireland medal winner at senior level as captain, Burns also won three Munster medals and five championship medals.

Burns made his debut on the inter-county scene at the age of twenty when he first linked up with the Cork under-21 team. An All-Ireland medal winner in this grade, he later made his senior debut during the 1974-75 league. Burns went on to play a key role for Cork in defence during a hugely successful era, and won three All-Ireland medals, five Munster medals, one National Hurling League medal plus Oireachtas and Wembley Tournament medals.

Throughout his inter-county career Burns made 26 inter county appearances. He retired from inter-county hurling following the conclusion of the 1980 championship. Burns also had a distinguished inter- varsity hurling career, winning a Fitzgibbon medal and acting as selector with UCD in the 1970s. He later played with UCC.

In retirement from playing Burns became involved in team management and coaching. He has served as manager of the Cork minor team on a number of occasions, guiding the team to All-Ireland success in 1998. On retirement from the Barrs he continued to play with Carraig na bhFear where he now lived. He coached Carraig to their first East Cork title in 2008. He also coached the local Rockbán camogie team to county titles on two occasions.

In the 1980s Burns initiated a project to produce a 'Hurling Coaching Manual'. Those involved included Pat Daly, (Croke Park), Ned Power (Waterford) and Brendan O' Sullivan (Kilkenny). The Manual and a follow-up booklet were the coaching materials for the Croke Park coaching initiatives in the 1990s.

Burns also served on the Croke Park 'Hurling Committee' for two terms in the 1990s. During their term the back door was introduced for beaten provincial finalists and work initiated on the standardisation of sliotars and blood replacements. He also served on the ' Urban Development Committee', Croke Park.

== Playing career ==
=== Club ===
Burns played his club hurling with St Finbarr's and enjoyed much success during a golden age for the club.

In 1974 Burns was a key member of the starting fifteen as St. Finbarr's returned to the top table of Cork hurling once again. In spite of being regarded as underdogs in the championship decider against Blackrock, Con Roche gave a masterful display in helping "the Barr's" to a 2-17 to 2-14 victory. It was Burns's first championship medal. Newmarket-on-Fergus were the opponents in the subsequent provincial decider. A low-scoring 0-7 to 0-3 victory gave Burns his first Munster medal, however, the game was tinged with sadness for St. Finbarr's as an horrific shin-bone injury brought Bernie Scully's career to an end. Burns was off the starting fifteen for the club's subsequent All-Ireland triumph having suffered a broken hand on Fitzgibbon duty with UCD.

In 1977 a 1-17 to 1-5 trouncing of north side rivals gave Burns his second championship medal. He also captained the side. A comfortable 2-8 to 0-6 defeat of Sixmilebridge in a replay after a nerve-wracking draw, saw him win his second Munster medal. He later lined out in the All-Ireland final with Rathnure, the Wexford and Leinster champions, providing the opposition. The first-half was a disaster for St. Finbarr’s as a gale-force wind resulted in the Cork side trailing by 0-8 to 0-1. The second thirty minutes saw "the Barr’s" take control with Jimmy Barry-Murphy scoring the deciding goal. A 2-7 to 0-9 victory gave Burn his second All-Ireland Senior Club Hurling Championship medal.

1980 saw Burns add a third championship medal to his collection as Glen Rovers were accounted for on a 1-9 to 2-4 score line. He later picked up a third Munster medal as Roscrea fell narrowly by 2-12 to 1-14. A record-equaling third All-Ireland medal proved beyond St. Finbarr's who were beaten by Ballyhale Shamrocks in the decider. However, the Barrs bounced back to win the County in 1981.

A County championship final defeat of Blackrock in 1982 brought Burns's championship medal tally to five. He retired from senior club hurling following defeat to Patrickswell in the Munster Club Championship. Burns gave a man of the match performance in his final game for the Barrs and was recognised by the club with the award of Clubman of the Year for 1982.

Burns was also a footballer of distinction. He played minor and under 21 football for Cork and captained the Barrs to victory in the inaugural Under 21 County title in 1973. He won two All Ireland Club football medals with the club.

After 1982 Burns continued to hurl in the junior grade with Carraig na bhFear where he now lived, finishing his playing career as a goalkeeper in the 1990s.

=== Inter-county ===
Burns first came to prominence on the inter-county scene as a member of the Cork under-21 team as an unused substitute in 1972.

The following year he made his under-21 debut in a Munster quarter-final defeat of Waterford. Burns later won a Munster medal following a 4-11 to 2-7 defeat of Limerick in the provincial decider. The subsequent All-Ireland final pitted Cork against Wexford. A 2-10 to 4-2 victory gave Burns an All-Ireland medal.

Burns joined the Cork senior hurling team in 1975 and was an unused substitute for Cork's Munster final triumph over Limerick. He made his debut as a substitute in Cork's subsequent All-Ireland semi-final defeat by Galway.

1976 saw Burns win his first Munster medal as Limerick were beaten by 3-15 to 4-5. He was an unused substitute for Cork's subsequent All-Ireland victory over Wexford.

After playing little part in the 1977 championship campaign, Burns was at right corner-back for the following year's provincial decider. A 0-13 to 0-11 defeat of Clare in a dour game gave Burns his second Munster medal on the field of play. He was a sub for the subsequent All-Ireland victory over Kilkenny.

Two years later in 1980 Burns won a National Hurling League medal following a 4-15 to 4-6 defeat of Limerick in a replay of the decider. He was an unused substitute for the subsequent championship and retired from inter-county hurling at the end of the season.

== Post-playing career ==
In retirement from playing, Burns remained involved in the game of hurling. He was the coach of the Cork minor hurling team in 1998 and guided the team to both Munster and All-Ireland honours in his first year in charge.

== Honours ==
St Finbarr's

- All-Ireland Senior Club Hurling Championship (2): 1975, 1978 (c)
- Munster Senior Club Hurling Championship (3): 1974, 1977 (c), 1980
- Cork Senior Hurling Championship (5): 1974, 1977 (c), 1980, 1981, 1982
- Cork Intermediate Football Championship (1): 1970

Cork

- All-Ireland Senior Hurling Championship (3): 1976 (sub), 1977 (sub), 1978 (sub)
- Munster Senior Hurling Championship (5): 1975 (sub), 1976, 1977 (sub), 1978, 1979 (sub)
- National Hurling League (1): 1979-80
- All-Ireland Under-21 Hurling Championship (1): 1973
- Munster Under-21 Hurling Championship (1): 1973

Achievements
Preceded by Martin O'Doherty (Glen Rovers)	All-Ireland Senior Club Hurling Final winning captain 1978	Succeeded by John Horgan (Blackrock)
Preceded by Colm Honan (Clare)	All-Ireland Minor Hurling Final winning manager 1998	Succeeded by John Hardiman (Galway)
