= Michael Cussen =

Irish hurler and Gaelic footballer

Personal information
- Native name: Mícheál Cúisín (Irish)
- Born: 11 April 1984 (age 42) Glanmire, County Cork, Ireland
- Occupation: Garda Síochána
- Height: 6 ft 7 in (201 cm)

Sport
- Football Position: Full-forward
- Hurling Position: Full-forward
Club
- Years: Club
- Glanmire / Sarsfields
Club titles
	Football	Hurling
Cork titles	0	3
Inter-county*
Years	County	Apps (scores)
2007–2009 2015–present 2010–2015	Cork (football); Cork (hurling)	12 (2–5); 7 (0–2)
Inter-county titles
	Football	Hurling
Munster Titles	1	0
All-Ireland Titles	0	0
League titles	0	0
All-Stars	0	0
- *Inter County team apps and scores correct as of 15:02, 20 August 2013.

Michael Cussen (born 11 April 1984) is an Irish hurler and footballer who played as a full-forward for the Cork senior team.

Born in Glanmire, County Cork, Cussen first played competitive hurling and Gaelic football in his youth. He arrived on the inter-county scene at the age of eighteen when he first linked up with the Cork minor football team, before later lining out with the under-21 sides in both codes. He made his senior debut with the footballers in the 2007 championship. Cussen went on to play a key role for Cork, and won one Munster medal as well as being an All-Ireland runner-up on two occasions. In 2010 he switched codes and joined the Cork senior hurling team.

At club level Cussen has won three championship medals with Sarsfields. He plays football with its sister club Glanmire.

== Playing career ==
=== Club ===
After coming to prominence at underage levels, winning a championship medal in the under-21 hurling grade, Cussen later went on to become a key player st senior level.

On 28 September 2008 he lined out in his first senior championship decider with Bride Rovers providing the opposition. Cussen scored 1–2, however, a goal by Robert O'Driscoll with seven minutes of normal time left proved the decisive score as Sarsfields claimed a 2–14 to 2–13 victory. It was his first championship medal.

After surrendering their championship crown to Newtownshandrum in 2009, Sarsfields reached a third successive championship decider on 10 October 2010. Glen Rovers, who were playing in their first championship decider in nineteen years, provided the opposition. Cussen, in spite of failing to score himself, set up Kieran Murphy for a key point late in the game. A narrow 1–17 to 0–18 victory gave him a second championship medal.

Sarsfields failed to retain the title once again, however, on 7 October 2012 Cussen lined out in his fourth championship decider in five years. Sars were the more experienced side as Bishopstown were the surprise finalists. In spite of this, it took a late goal from Robert O'Driscoll to secure a 1–15 to 1–13 victory.

=== Inter-county ===
Cussen first came to prominence on the inter-county scene as a member of the Cork minor football panel in 2002. The following year he was on the Cork under-21 football panel, however, he enjoyed little success in these grades.

By 2005 Cussen had progressed onto the Cork under-21 hurling team and was at full-forward for the championship. A 4–8 to 0–13 defeat of Tipperary in the provincial decider helped him secure a Munster medal in this grade.

Cussen made his senior football debut in a National Football League against Dublin in 2007. He later received his first championship start in a Munster quarter-final defeat of Limerick, however, Cork subsequently faced a narrow 1–15 to 1–13 defeat by Kerry in the provincial decider. In spite of this defeat, both side later met on 16 September 2007 in a first all-Munster All-Ireland decider. The game, however, turned into an absolute rout and an embarrassment for Cork. A final score line of 3–13 to 1–9 gave Kerry a second consecutive All-Ireland title.

In 2008 Cussen lined out in a second Munster decider, with old rivals Kerry providing the opposition once again. At half-time the game looked lost for the Rebel's as they trailed by eight points, however, a goal by Cussen revived his side's fortunes. The final score of 1–16 to 1–11 gave Cork a remarkable victory and gave Cussen a Munster medal.

Cussen was dropped to the substitutes' bench in 2009 as Cork retained the Munster crown. On 20 September 2007 Cork faced Kerry in the All-Ireland final for the second time in three years. Cussen started the game on the bench, however, he was introduced as a late sub for Alan O'Connor. Cork had a great opening quarter, but wasted a number of scoring chances in the second half, before eventually being defeated by 0–16 to 1–9.

In December 2009 Cussen quit the Cork football squad to concentrate on making the county's hurling panel. His decision to switch codes saw him become a regular during Cork's subsequent National Hurling League campaign, and he was chosen on the starting fifteen as Cork faced Galway in the decider. A thrilling game followed, however, the Tribesmen eventually triumphed by 2–22 to 1–17. Later that season on 30 May 2010, he made his championship debut when he came on as a substitute in Cork's shock Munster quarter-final defeat of Tipperary. Cussen was a regular sub throughout the provincial campaign and received his first starting fifteen berth as Cork were defeated by 1–16 to 1–13 after extra time in a replay of the Munster decider.

After being dropped from the panel under new manager Jimmy Barry-Murphy in 2012, Cussen was recalled to the Cork senior hurling panel for the 2013 season. On 14 July 2013 he was introduced as a substitute in the Munster decider, however, Cork faced a 0–24 to 0–15 defeat by Limerick.

== Honours ==
=== Team ===
Sarsfield's

- Cork Senior Hurling Championship (3): 2008, 2010, 2012
- Cork Under-21 Hurling Championship (1): 2003

Cork

- Munster Senior Football Championship (2): 2008, 2009 (sub)
- Munster Under-21 Hurling Championship (1): 2005
