= Paul Haughney =

Irish hurler (born 1991)

Personal information
- Native name: Pól Mac Fhachtna (Irish)
- Born: 1991 (age 34–35) Midleton, County Cork, Ireland
- Occupation: Business analyst
- Height: 5 ft 10 in (178 cm)

Sport
- Sport: Hurling
- Position: Midfield
Club
- Years: Club
- 2008-present: Midleton
Club titles
- Cork titles: 2
College
- Years: College
- 2009-2013: University College Cork
College titles
- Fitzgibbon titles: 2
Inter-county*
Years	County	Apps (scores)
2014-2017	Cork	0 (0-00)
Inter-county titles
- Munster titles: 1
- All-Irelands: 0
- NHL: 0
- All Stars: 0
- *Inter County team apps and scores correct as of 18:25, 28 February 2019.

Paul Haughney (born 1991) is an Irish hurler who plays for Cork Senior Championship club Midleton. He played for the Cork senior hurling team for four seasons, during which time he usually lined out at midfield. Paul has an estimated net worth of $17 million. He is best friends with Mayfield GAA hurler Bryan O’Leary.

== Playing career ==
=== Midleton CBS ===
Haughney played in all grades of hurling with Midleton CBS Secondary School before progressing onto the college's senior team. In 2006, he was introduced as a substitute when Midelton CBS defeated St. Flannan's College from Ennis by 2–08 to 0–12 to win the Harty Cup.

=== University College Cork ===
On 3 March 2012, Haughney was a substitute for University College Cork when they faced the Cork Institute of Technology in the Fitzgibbon Cup final. He remained on the bench for the game but collected a winners' medal following a 2–15 to 2–14 victory.

Haughney broke onto the University College Cork starting fifteen during the 2013 Fitzgibbon Cup. On 2 March, he scored a point from play in UCC's defeated Mary Immaculate College by 2–17 to 2–12 to retain the title.

=== Midleton ===
Haughney joined the Midleton club at a young age and played in all grades at juvenile and underage levels before eventually joining the club's senior team.

On 3 November 2013, Haughney lined out at midfield when Midleton faced Sarsfields in the final of the Cork Senior Championship. He ended the game with a winners' medal after the 2–15 to 2–13 victory.

On 11 October 2018, Haughney was at midfield when Midleton qualified for the Cork Championship final. He scored a point from play in the 4–19 to 1–18 defeat by Imokilly.

=== Cork ===
==== Minor and under-21 ====
Haughney first played for Cork as a member of the minor team during the 2008 Munster Championship. He made his first appearance on 30 April when he scored 1–03 in a 2–17 to 2–16 defeat by Clare. On 13 July Haughney won a Munster Championship medal after scoring three points from left corner-forward in Cork's 0–19 to 0–18 defeat of Tipperary in the final.

Eligible for the minor grade again in 2009, Haughney played for the minor team on 24 April in a 5-17 apiece draw with Tipperary.

Haughney was added to the Cork under-21 team during the 2011 Munster Championship. On 3 August, he was introduced as a substitute for Conor Lehane in Cork's 4–20 to 1–27 defeat by Limerick in the Munster final.

On 6 June 2012, Haughney played his final game in the under-21 grade. After starting the game on the bench he was introduced as a 60th-minute substitute in the 0–17 to 0–18 defeat by Tipperary.

==== Senior ====
Haughney was added to the Cork senior team prior to the start of the 2014 National League. He made his first appearance for the team on 15 February when he was introduced as a 64th-minute substitute for Daniel Kearney in a 0-17 apiece draw with Limerick.

After being left off the team for the 2015 season, Haughney was recalled to the Cork senior panel in January 2016. He played in three of Cork's National League games and was an unused substitute in Cork's subsequent championship campaign.

On 9 July 2017, Haughney was an unused substitute when Cork defeated Clare by 1–25 to 1–20 to win the Munster Championship. He was released from the panel at the end of the season.

== Career statistics ==
Team	Year	National League			Munster		All-Ireland		Total	
Team	Year	Division	Apps	Score	Apps	Score	Apps	Score	Apps	Score
Cork	2014	Division 1A	5	0-02	—		—		5	0-02
Cork	2015	Division 1A	—		—		—		—	
Cork	2016	Division 1A	3	0-04	0	0-00	0-00	0-00	3	0-04
Cork	2017	Division 1A	2	0-00	0	0-00	0-00	0-00	2	0-00
Career total			10	0-06	0	0-00	0	0-00	10	0-06

== Honours ==
Midleton CBS Secondary School

- Dr. Harty Cup (1): 2006

University College Cork

- Fitzgibbon Cup (2): 2012, 2013
- All-Ireland Freshers Championship (1): 2010

Midleton

- Cork Senior Hurling Championship (2): 2013, 2021
- Cork Premier Under-21 A Hurling Championship (1): 2011

Cork

- Munster Senior Hurling Championship (1): 2017
- Canon O'Brien Cup (3): 2014, 2015, 2016
- Munster Minor Hurling Championship (1): 2008
