= 1964 Cork Senior Hurling Championship =

Annual hurling competition season

- Dates: 19 April 1964 – 11 October 1964
- Teams: 16
- Champions: Glen Rovers (20th title); Christy Ring (captain)
- Runners-up: St. Finbarr's; Tim O'Mullane (captain)

Tournament statistics
- Matches played: 16
- Goals scored: 98 (6.13 per match)
- Points scored: 260 (16.25 per match)
- Top scorer(s): Patsy Harte (3-17)

The 1964 Cork Senior Hurling Championship was the 76th staging of the Cork Senior Hurling Championship since its establishment by the Cork County Board in 1887. The draw for the opening fixtures took place at the Cork Convention on 26 January 1964. The championship began on 19 April 1964 and ended on 11 October 1964.

University College Cork were the defending champions, however, they were defeated by St. Finbarr's at the quarter-final stage.

On 11 October 1964, Glen Rovers won the championship following a 3–12 to 2–7 defeat of St. Finbarr's in the final. This was their 20th championship title overall and their first in two championship seasons.

Patsy Harte of the Glen Rovers club was the championship's top scorer with 3–17.

== Team changes ==
=== To Championship ===
Promoted from the Cork Intermediate Hurling Championship

- Cobh

=== From Championship ===
Regraded to the Cork Intermediate Hurling Championship

- Midleton

== Results ==
First round

19 April 1964 First round	Duhallow	3-06 - 11-09	Carbery	Macroom
			TJ Collins 3-3, D O'Mahony 2-2, F O'Brien 2-1, S Mahony 2-0, L Hurley 2-0, D Lyons 0-2, M McNamara 0-1.	Referee: L Baker (Ballincollig)

19 April 1964 First round	Passage	3-05 - 1-09	St. Vincent's	Galway's Lane, Douglas
	J Coughlan 1-1, J O'Reilly 1-0, E O'Brien 1-0, J McCarthy 0-3, C Healy 0-1.			Referee: L Dowling (Castlemartyr)

19 April 1964 First round	Sarsfields	2-12 - 2-08	Cobh	Clonmult Memorial Park, Midleton
	P Barry 1-7, J Long 1-0, JJ Long 0-2, R Lotty 0-2, P O'Meara 0-1.		P Butler 1-1, S Butler 0-4, L Butler 1-0, M Meaney 0-1, J O'Connell 0-1, J Clifford 0-1.

26 April 1964 First round	Carrigdhoun	3-03 - 3-05	Na Piarsaigh	Manning Park, Passage
	S Kelly 2-1, M O'Donoghue 1-0, S Nyhan 0-1, J Holland 0-1.		D O'Sullivan 2-0, P Kelleher 1-0, P Allen 0-2, J Crowley 0-1, J Buckley 0-1, D Sheehan 0-1.	Referee: P Cronin (St. Finbarr's)

3 May 1964 First round	Seandún	4-02 - 4-18	St. Finbarr's	Cork Athletic Grounds, Cork
	D McDonnell 2-0, P Browne 1-0, T McCarthy 1-0, Pat Finn 0-1, D Downey 0-1.		W Doyle 2-1, M Archer 1-3, G McCarthy 0-5, C McCarthy 1-0, W Walsh 0-3, C Roche 0-2, P Doolan 0-2, J Hogan 0-1, D Murphy 0-1.	Referee: J Lotty (Sarsfields)

10 May 1964 First round	Imokilly	3-06 - 2-09	University College Cork	Riverstown
	L Dowling 1-2, J O'Connor 1-0, J Griffin 1-0, P Fitzgerald 0-1, M O'Mahony 0-1, G McCarthy 0-1.		M Murphy 1-3, J Byrne 1-1, D Harney 0-3, J Blake 0-2.	Referee: M Walsh (Mayfield)

24 May 1964 First round	Avondhu	4-08 - 3-09	Blackrock	Páirc Mac Gearailt, Fermoy
	R Browne 2-1, P Behan 1-3, G O'Connell 1-1, L Sheehan 0-1, J White 0-1, J Horgan 0-1.		J Redmond 2-1, J Bennett 0-5, F O'Mahony 1-1, E Burke 0-1, J O'Leary 0-1.	Referee: F Halbert (Glenville)

14 June 1964 First round	Muskerry	2-07 - 5-13	Glen Rovers	Ballincollig
	T O'Riordan 1-0, C Sheehan 1-0, P O'Brien 0-3, M Murphy 0-1, F Kelleher 0-1, S Barry-Murphy 0-1, T O'Mahony 0-1.		B Carroll 2-2, P Harte 1-3, C Ring 1-1, S Kennefick 1-0, J Daly 0-2, T Corbett 0-2, J O'Sullivan 0-1, M Lane 0-1, A Flynn 0-1.	Referee: P Cronin (St. Finbarr's)

5 July 1964 First round replay	University College Cork	2-12 - 3-07	Imokilly	Riverstown
	M Fahy 1-1, J Blake 0-4, D Kelleher 1-0, D Harnedy 0-3, J Byrne 0-2, J O'Halloran 0-1, M Irwin 0-1.		V Flanagan 2-0, T Browne 1-2, P Fitzgerald 0-3, N Foley 0-1, J O'Flynn 0-1.	Referee: C Conway (Blarney)

Quarter-finals

14 June 1964 Quarter-final	Na Piarsaigh	4-07 - 1-02	Carbery	Riverstick
	J Twomey 3-0, C Mulcahy 1-1, J Sheehan 0-2, P Allen 0-2, D Guiney 0-2.		D Lyons 1-0, C Tobin 0-2, D O'Mahony 0-1.	Referee: M O'Connell (St Vincent's)

21 June 1964 Quarter-final	Sarsfields	4-11 - 3-06	Passage	Cork Athletic Grounds, Cork
	P Barry 1-7, J Lotty 2-1, J Long 1-1, P Cogan 0-1, M Barry 0-1.		J McCarthy 1-4, C Healy 2-0, E O'Brien 0-1, J O'Connor 0-1.	Referee: WJ Daly (Carrigtwohill)

30 August 1964 Quarter-final	St. Finbarr's	1-13 - 2-06	University College Cork	Cork Athletic Grounds, Cork
	C McCarthy 0-5, W Walsh 1-0, G McCarthy 0-3, C Roche 0-2, M Finn 0-1, P Doolan 0-1, M Archer 0-1.		J Alley 1-0, M Kirwan 1-0, J Blake 0-3, M Fahy 0-1, J Gleeson 0-1, J O'Byrne 0-1.	Referee: M Walsh (Mayfield)

13 September 1964 Quarter-final	Glen Rovers	4-09 - 3-10	Avondhu	Clonmult Memorial Park, Midleton
	P Harte 1-5, W Carroll 2-1, A O'Flynn 1-0, C Ring 0-2, J Daly 0-1.		R Browne 1-5, P Behan 1-2, J Hogan 1-0, J O'Connell 0-2, J White 0-1.	Referee: F Halbert (Glenville)

Semi-finals

13 September 1964 Semi-final	St. Finbarr's	6-07 - 2-07	Na Piarsaigh	Cork Athletic Grounds, Cork
	M Archer 4-0, W Walsh 1-1, G McCarthy 0-4, C McCarthy 1-0, P Finn 0-1, M Finn 0-1.		J Twomey 2-1, J Buckley 0-3, N Greaney 0-2, C Mulcahy 0-1.	Referee: M Walsh (Mayfield)

20 September 1964 Semi-final	Glen Rovers	2-09 - 1-06	Sarsfields	Cork Athletic Grounds, Cork
	P Harte 1-3, T Corbett 1-1, J Salmon 0-2, A O'Flynn 0-1, W Carroll 0-1, C Ring 0-1.		P Barry 1-1, D Hurley 0-3, N Long 0-1, J Lotty 0-1.	Referee: P Cronin (St. Finbarr's)

Final

11 October 1964 Final	Glen Rovers	3-12 - 2-07	St. Finbarr's	Athletic Grounds, Cork
	C Ring 1-4; P Harte 0-6; D Moore 1-1; W Carroll 0-1; A Flynn 1-0.		M Archer 1-2; W Doyle 1-0; G McCarthy 0-2; M Finn 0-2; C McCarthy 0-1.	Attendance: 24,000

== Championship statistics ==
=== Top scorers ===
Top scorer overall

Rank	Player	Club	Tally	Total	Matches	Average
1	Patsy Harte	Glen Rovers	3-17	26	4	6.50
2	Mick Archer	St. Finbarr's	6-06	24	4	6.00
2	Paddy Barry	Sarsfields	3-15	24	3	8.00
4	Bill Carroll	Glen Rovers	4-05	17	4	4.25
5	Joe Twomey	Na Piarsaigh	5-01	16	2	8.00
6	Richie Browne	Avondhu	3-06	15	2	7.50
7	Christy Ring	Glen Rovers	2-08	14	4	3.50
7	Gerald McCarthy	St. Finbarr's	0-14	14	4	3.50
9	T. J. Collins	Carbery	3-03	12	2	6.00
9	Charlie McCarthy	St. Finbarr's	2-06	12	4	3.00

Top scorers in a single game

Rank	Player	Club	Tally	Total	Opposition
1	Mick Archer	St. Finbarr's	4-00	12	Passage
1	T. J. Collins	Carbery	3-03	12	Duhallow
3	Paddy Barry	Sarsfields	1-07	10	Cobh
3	Paddy Barry	Sarsfields	1-07	10	Passage
5	Joe Twomey	Na Piarsaigh	3-00	9	Carbery
6	Donie O'Mahony	Carbery	2-02	8	Duhallow
6	Bill Carroll	Glen Rovers	2-02	8	Muskerry
6	Patsy Harte	Glen Rovers	1-05	8	Avondhu
6	Richie Browne	Avondhu	1-05	8	Glen Rovers
10	F. O'Brien	Carbery	2-01	7	Duhallow
10	Seán Kelly	Carrigdhoun	2-01	7	Na Piarsaigh
10	Willie Doyle	ST. Finbarr's	2-01	7	Seandún
10	Richie Browne	Avondhu	2-01	7	Blackrock
10	John Redmond	Blackrock	2-01	7	Avondhu
10	Jim Lotty	Sarsfields	2-01	7	Passage
10	Bill Carroll	Glen Rovers	2-01	7	Avondhu
10	Joe Twomey	Na Piarsaigh	2-01	7	St. Finbarr's
10	Justin McCarthy	Passage	1-04	7	Sarsfields
10	Christy Ring	Glen Rovers	1-04	7	St. Finbarr's

=== Miscellaneous ===
- Christy Ring won his final title on the field of play.
