= William Kearney (hurler) =

Irish hurler

Personal information
- Native name: Liam Ó Cearnaigh (Irish)
- Born: 19 December 1989 (age 36) Glanmire, County Cork, Ireland
- Occupation: Accountant
- Height: 5 ft 9 in (175 cm)

Sport
- Sport: Hurling
- Position: Right corner-back
Club
- Years: Club
- Sarsfields
Club titles
- Cork titles: 4
College
- Years: College
- 2007-2011: University College Cork
College titles
- Fitzgibbon titles: 1
Inter-county**
Years	County	Apps (scores)
2015-present	Cork	0 (0-00)
Inter-county titles
- Munster titles: 1
- All-Irelands: 0
- NHL: 0
- All Stars: 0
- **Inter County team apps and scores correct as of 20:30, 27 January 2019.

William Kearney (born 19 December 1989) is an Irish hurler who Cork Senior Championship club Sarsfields and at inter-county level with the Cork senior hurling team. He usually lines out as a right corner-back.

== Early life ==
Kearney was born in Glanmire, County Cork. His twin brother, Daniel Kearney, also plays for Cork.

== Career statistics ==
=== Club ===
As of match played 16 September 2018.

Team	Season	Cork		Munster		All-Ireland		Total	
Team	Season	Apps	Score	Apps	Score	Apps	Score	Apps	Score
Sarsfields	2007-08	0	0-00	—		—		0	0-00
Sarsfields	2008-09	2	0-00	1	0-00	—		3	0-00
Sarsfields	2009-10	4	0-01	—		—		4	0-01
Sarsfields	2010-11	2	0-00	1	0-00	—		3	0-00
Sarsfields	2011-12	2	0-01	—		—		2	0-01
Sarsfields	2012-13	4	1-02	1	0-00	—		5	1-02
Sarsfields	2013-14	5	0-01	—		—		5	0-01
Sarsfields	2014-15	6	0-00	1	0-00	—		7	0-00
Sarsfields	2015-16	7	0-01	—		—		7	0-01
Sarsfields	2016-17	3	0-00	—		—		3	0-00
Sarsfields	2017-18	7	0-02	—		—		7	0-02
Sarsfields	2018-19	3	0-02	—		—		3	0-02
Total		45	1-10	4	0-00	—		49	1-10

=== Inter-county ===
As of match played 27 January 2019.

Team	Year	National League			Munster		All-Ireland		Total	
Team	Year	Division	Apps	Score	Apps	Score	Apps	Score	Apps	Score
Cork	2015	Division 1A	3	0-00	0	0-00	0	0-00	3	0-00
Cork	2016	Division 1A	—		—		—		—	
Cork	2017	Division 1A	—		—		—		—	
Cork	2018	Division 1A	0	0-00	0	0-00	0	0-00	0	0-00
Cork	2019	Division 1A	0	0-00	0	0-00	0	0-00	0	0-00
Career total			3	0-00	0	0-00	0	0-00	3	0-00

== Honours ==
University College Cork

- Fitzgibbon Cup (1): 2009

Sarsfields

- Cork Senior Hurling Championship (4): 2008, 2010, 2012, 2014
- Cork Minor Hurling Championship (1): 2007

Cork

- Munster Senior Hurling Championship (1): 2018
