= John Rothwell (hurler) =

Irish hurler

Personal information
- Born: 1951 (age 74–75) Blackrock, County Cork

Sport
- Sport: Hurling
- Position: Full-forward
Club
- Years: Club
- 1960s-1980s: Blackrock
Inter-county
Years	County	Apps (scores)
1972-1975	Cork	3 (0-00)
Inter-county titles
- Munster titles: 1 (as sub)
- All-Irelands: 1 (as sub)
- NHL: 0
- All Stars: `10000000000000000000000000001

John Rothwell (born 1951 in Blackrock, County Cork) is an Irish former sportsperson. He played hurling with his local club Blackrock and was a member of the Cork minor, under-21 and senior inter-county teams in the late 1960s and early 1970s.
