= John Mitchell (hurler) =

Irish hurler and manager

Personal information
- Native name: Seán Mistéil (Irish)
- Born: 1946 (age 79–80) Blarney, County Cork, Ireland

Sport
- Sport: Hurling
- Position: Goalkeeper
Clubs
- Years: Club
- Blarney; UCC; Kilmacud Crokes
Club titles
- Dublin titles: 2
Inter-county
- Years: County
- Cork; London; Wicklow
Inter-county titles
- Munster titles: 0
- All-Irelands: 0
- NHL: 0

John Mitchell (born 1946) is an Irish retired hurler and manager who played as a goalkeeper for the Cork, London and Wicklow senior teams.

Mitchell joined the Cork team during the 1968-69 National Hurling League and was a regular member of the starting fifteen until he left the panel after the 1970 championship. He later played with London before lining out for Wicklow until 1982. During that time he won one National League (Division 2) medal on the field of play as well as two Munster medals as a non-playing substitute. Mitchell was an All-Ireland runner-up as a sub on one occasion.

At club level Mitchell began his career with Blarney before later winning two county club championship medals with Kilmacud Crokes.

== Playing career ==
=== University ===
During his studies at University College Cork (UCC) Mitchell joined the college senior hurling team. He was between the posts in 1967 as UCC defeated University College Galway by 3-17 to 2-5 to secure the Fitzgibbon Cup.

Mitchell was first-choice goalkeeper with the UCC team again in 1968 and 1969, however, University College Dublin were the victors on both occasions.

=== Club ===
Mitchell began his club hurling career with Blarney in the early 1960s. He won a divisional junior championship medal in 1968.

By 1974 Mitchell was playing his club hurling with Kilmacud Crokes in Dublin. He lined out in the senior championship decider that year with Faughs providing the opposition. A 3-13 to 4-9 victory gave Mitchell a Dublin Senior Hurling Championship medal.

After surrendering their title the following year, Kilmacud Crokes were back in the decider again in 1976. Although regarded as the underdogs, Kilmacud secured a 0-17 to 2-8 victory and Mitchell captured his second championship medal.

=== Inter-county ===
Mitchell first came to prominence on the inter-county scene as a member of the Cork minor hurling team in 1964. A 2-14 to 2-9 defeat of Tipperary gave him a Munster medal after being introduced as a substitute. He later won an All-Ireland medal as a non-playing substitute following a 10-7 to 1-4 trouncing of Laois.

By 1966 Mitchell had joined the Cork under-21 team. He was an unused substitute for the early rounds of the championship but took over as first-choice goalkeeper as Cork reached the All-Ireland final. That game ended in a draw as Wexford recorded 5-6 to Cork's 3-12. The replay also ended all square - 4-9 apiece. At the third time of asking Cork emerged victorious with a huge tally of 9-9 to 5-9. This victory gave Cork their first All-Ireland title in this grade and gave Mitchell an All-Ireland Under-21 Hurling Championship medal.

Three years later in 1969 Mitchell was added to the Cork panel as goalkeeping understudy to Paddy Barry. He won a Munster medal as a non-playing sub when Tipperary were beaten by 4-6 to 0-9. Cork were later defeated by Kilkenny in the All-Ireland decider.

Mitchell added a National Hurling League medal to his collection in 1970, however, he was once again an unused substitute. He later picked up a second Munster medal as a non-playing member of the panel as Tipperary were bested once again. Mitchell left the Cork team before the All-Ireland series and was replaced as second-choice goalkeeper by Martin Coleman.

In 1971 Mitchell was a member of the London intermediate hurling team that were defeated by Wicklow in the All-Ireland semi-final.

After returning to Ireland Mitchell joined the Wicklow senior hurling team. In the twilight of his career he won a National Hurling League (Division 2) medal after wins over Meath, Roscommon, Armagh, Down, Mayo and Kildare.
