= Niall Cashman =

Irish hurler

Personal information
- Native name: Niall Ó Cíosáin (Irish)
- Born: 26 July 1995 (age 31) Blackrock, Cork, Ireland
- Occupation: Sales Operations Specialist
- Height: 6 ft 1 in (185 cm)

Sport
- Sport: Hurling
- Position: Left wing-back
Club
- Years: Club
- 2014-present: Blackrock
Club titles
- Cork titles: 1
College
- Years: College
- 2014-2019: University College Cork
College titles
- Fitzgibbon titles: 0
Inter-county**
Years	County	Apps (scores)
2015-present	Cork	0 (0-00)
Inter-county titles
- Munster titles: 0
- All-Irelands: 0
- NHL: 0
- All Stars: 0
- **Inter County team apps and scores correct as of 21:55, 31 July 2021.

Niall Cashman (born 26 July 1995) is an Irish hurler who plays as a left wing-back for Cork Championship club Blackrock and at inter-county level with the Cork senior team.

== Playing career ==
=== Blackrock ===
Cashman joined Blackrock at a young age, a club with whom his family had a long tradition. His father, Jim Cashman, uncle, Tom Cashman, grandfather, Mick Cashman, and granduncle, Jimmy Brohan, were senior team mainstays from the 1950s until the 1990s. His underage career coincided with a hugely successful period for the club, with Cashman winning three successive minor titles before back-to-back under-21 championships in a five-year period between 2011 and 2015.

Cashman was still eligible for the minor team when he joined the Blackrock senior team and made his debut when he came on as a substitute in a fourth round defeat by Ballymartle in the 2014 County Championship. An undefeated run through the 2017 County Championship campaign saw Blackrock qualify for the final, with Cashman's side ultimately facing a four-point defeat by Imokilly. After a three-year absence Blackrock qualified for the 2020 final, with Cashman claiming a winners' medal after the 4–26 to 4-18 extra-time win over Glen Rovers.

=== Cork ===
After being overlooked for the Cork minor team, Cashman was 19-years-old when he was drafted onto the under-21 team in advance of the 2015 Munster Championship. He made his first appearance for the team when he lined out at left wing-back in a ten-point semi-final defeat by Waterford. Cashman's two-year tenure with the Cork under-21 team ended without a single victory.

In October 2015, Cashman was drafted onto the Cork senior panel by team manager Kieran Kingston in advance of the pre-season 2016 Munster League. He made his first senior appearance in a 1–14 to 0–14 defeat by Clare. Cashman was retained on the panel for the subsequent National League and Championship but was unused throughout those campaigns. He was released from the panel at the end of the season.

Success at club level earned Cashman a recall to the Cork senior team prior to the start of the 2021 National League.

== Career statistics ==
As of 31 July 2021.

Team	Year	National League			Munster		All-Ireland		Total	
Team	Year	Division	Apps	Score	Apps	Score	Apps	Score	Apps	Score
Cork	2016	Division 1A	0	0-00	0	0-00	0	0-00	0	0-00
Cork	2017	Division 1A	—		—		—		—	
Cork	2018	Division 1A	—		—		—		—	
Cork	2019	Division 1A	—		—		—		—	
Cork	2020	Division 1A	—		—		—		—	
Cork	2021	Division 1A	4	0-00	0	0-00	0	0-00	4	0-00
Career total			4	0-00	0	0-00	0	0-00	4	0-00

== Honours ==
Blackrock

- Cork Premier Senior Hurling Championship (1): 2020
- Cork Under-21 Hurling Championship (2): 2014, 2015
- Cork Minor Hurling Championship (3): 2011, 2012, 2013
