= Cian McCarthy =

Cork hurler (born 1989)

Personal information
- Native name: Cian Mac Cárthaigh (Irish)
- Born: 3 September 1989 (age 37) Glanmire, County Cork, Ireland
- Height: 6 ft 0 in (183 cm)

Sport
- Sport: Hurling
- Position: Centre-forward
Clubs*
| Years | Club | Apps (scores) |
| 2008–2016 2017–2018 2019– 2021 | Sarsfields; Douglas; Passage → Seandún | 52 (17–309); 4 (1–22) 1 (1–2) |
Club titles
- Cork titles: 4
Inter-county**
| Years | County | Apps (scores) |
| 2010–2016 | Cork | 14 (1–16) |
Inter-county titles
- Munster titles: 1
- All-Irelands: 0
- NHL: 0
- All Stars: 0
- * club appearances and scores correct as of 23:09, 27 January 2019. **Inter County team apps and scores correct as of 20:00, 28 July 2014.

Cian McCarthy (born 3 September 1989) is an Irish hurler who plays for Junior Championship club Passage. He usually lines out in the half-forward line. McCarthy is a former member of the Sarsfields and the Cork senior hurling team.

== Early life ==
McCarthy was born in Glanmire, County Cork. His father, Teddy McCarthy, was a dual player with Cork and is the only player to have won All-Ireland medals at senior level in the same year.

== Playing career ==
=== Sarsfields ===
McCarthy joined the Sarsfields club at a young age and played in all grades at juvenile and underage levels, experiencing Cork Minor Championship success in 2007.

McCarthy made his first appearance with the Sarsfields senior team on 3 May 2008 in 2–09 to 2–08 defeat of Ballinhassig. On 28 September 2008, McCarthy lined out at right wing-forward in his first senior championship final. He scored one point from play in a 2–14 to 2–13 defeat of Bride Rovers to claim his first Cork Senior Championship medal.

After losing the 2009 final to Newrtownshandrum, Sarsfields were back in a third successive decider on 10 October 2010. McCarthy top scored for the team with eight points in the 1–17 to 0–18 defeat of Glen Rovers.

On 7 October 2012, Sarsfields lined out in their fourth championship final in five seasons. Trailing Bishopstown in the second half, McCarthy was the game's top scorer with eight points as Sarsfields went on to win by 1–15 to 1–14.

Sarsfields failed to retain the title in 2012 after suffering a two-point defeat by Midleton, however, McCarthy played in his sixth final in seven seasons on 12 October 2014. He was the game's top scorer with ten points in the 2–18 to 0–08 defeat of Glen Rovers.

=== Douglas ===
In February 2017, McCarthy transferred to the Douglas club. He made his first championship appearance in a 0–22 to 0–20 defeat by Cork Institute of Technology on 7 May 2017.

=== Passage ===
In November 2018, it was announced that McCarthy was transferring to the Passage club.

=== Cork ===
==== Minor and under-21 ====
McCarthy first played for Cork at minor level on 29 July 2007 in a 2–19 to 0-08 All-Ireland quarter-final defeat of Galway. On 2 September, he was introduced as a substitute in Cork's 3–14 to 2–11 defeat by Tipperary in the All-Ireland final.

On 3 June 2009, McCarthy made his first appearance for the Cork under-21 hurling team after being introduced as a substitute in Cork's 2–22 to 0–25 defeat by Tipperary.

==== Senior ====
In spite of failing to make the Cork under-21 team, McCarthy was drafted onto the Cork senior team in November 2008 as part of the so-called "development squad" that replaced the regular members of the team who were on strike. He made his first appearance for the team on 11 January 2009 in a 0–14 to 0–09 defeat by the Waterford Institute of Technology in the Waterford Crystal Cup. On 14 February, McCarthy made his first appearance in the National Hurling League when he was introduced as a substitute in a 2–15 to 0–09 defeat by Tipperary.

McCarthy made his first championship appearance on 8 August 2010 when he was introduced as a substitute in Cork's 3–22 to 0–19 defeat by Kilkenny in the All-Ireland semi-final.

On 28 September 2013, McCarthy lined out at centre-forward for Cork's All-Ireland final replay against Clare. He was the only change from the drawn match and replaced Jamie Coughlan in a reshuffled forward division. McCarthy was held scoreless in the 5–16 to 3–16 defeat.

On 13 July 2014, McCarthy won a Munster Championship medal as a non-playing substitute after a six-point defeat of Limerick in the final at Páirc Uí Chaoimh.

McCarthy made only one appearance during the 2015 National Hurling League before quitting the panel on 20 March 2015.

In October 2015, McCarthy was recalled to the Cork senior team under new manager Kieran Kingston. He made one appearance during the National League before being released from the panel in April 2016.

== Career statistics ==
=== Club ===
As of 13 November 2021

| Team | Year | Cork SHC | | Munster | | All-Ireland | | Total | |
| Team | Year | Apps | Score | Apps | Score | Apps | Score | Apps | Score |
|---|---|---|---|---|---|---|---|---|---|
| Sarsfields | 2008-09 | 5 | 1-04 | 2 | 0-05 | — | | 7 | 1-09 |
| Sarsfields | 2009-10 | 5 | 1-10 | — | | — | | 5 | 1-10 |
| Sarsfields | 2010-11 | 6 | 0-41 | 1 | 1-06 | — | | 7 | 1-47 |
| Sarsfields | 2011-12 | 3 | 1-18 | — | | — | | 3 | 1-18 |
| Sarsfields | 2012-13 | 5 | 2-38 | 1 | 0-08 | — | | 6 | 2-46 |
| Sarsfields | 2013-14 | 6 | 4-37 | — | | — | | 6 | 4-37 |
| Sarsfields | 2014-15 | 6 | 2-54 | 1 | 0-12 | — | | 7 | 2-66 |
| Sarsfields | 2015-16 | 7 | 3-58 | — | | — | | 7 | 3-58 |
| Sarsfields | 2016-17 | 4 | 2-18 | — | | — | | 4 | 2-18 |
| Sarsfields | Total | 47 | 16-278 | 5 | 1-31 | — | | 52 | 17-309 |
| Douglas | 2017-18 | 2 | 0-14 | — | | — | | 2 | 0-14 |
| Douglas | 2018-19 | 2 | 1-08 | — | | — | | 2 | 1-08 |
| Douglas | Total | 4 | 1-22 | — | | — | | 4 | 1-22 |
| | Year | Cork JAHC | | Munster | | All-Ireland | | Total | |
| | Year | Apps | Score | Apps | Score | Apps | Score | Apps | Score |
| Passage | 2019-20 | — | | — | | — | | 0 | 0-00 |
| Passage | 2020-21 | — | | — | | — | | 0 | 0-00 |
| Passage | 2021-22 | 1 | 1-02 | — | | — | | 1 | 1-02 |
| Passage | Total | 1 | 1-02 | — | | — | | 1 | 1-02 |
| Career total | | 52 | 18-302 | 5 | 1-31 | — | | 57 | 19-333 |

=== Inter-county ===
| Team | Year | National League | | | Munster | | All-Ireland | | Total | |
| Team | Year | Division | Apps | Score | Apps | Score | Apps | Score | Apps | Score |
|---|---|---|---|---|---|---|---|---|---|---|
| Cork | 2009 | Division 1 | 2 | 0-00 | 0 | 0-00 | 0 | 0-00 | 2 | 0-00 |
| Cork | 2010 | Division 1 | 4 | 1-02 | 0 | 0-00 | 1 | 0-00 | 5 | 1-02 |
| Cork | 2011 | Division 1 | 7 | 0-09 | 1 | 0-01 | 2 | 1-03 | 10 | 1-13 |
| Cork | 2012 | Division 1A | 1 | 0-00 | 1 | 0-01 | 4 | 0-10 | 6 | 0-11 |
| Cork | 2013 | Division 1A | 6 | 0-05 | 2 | 0-01 | 2 | 0-00 | 10 | 0-06 |
| Cork | 2014 | Division 1B | 5 | 0-02 | 1 | 0-00 | 0 | 0-00 | 6 | 0-02 |
| Cork | 2015 | Division 1A | 1 | 0-00 | — | | — | | 1 | 0-00 |
| Cork | 2016 | Division 1A | 1 | 0-01 | — | | — | | 1 | 0-01 |
| Career total | | | 27 | 1-19 | 5 | 0-03 | 9 | 1-13 | 41 | 2-35 |

== Honours ==
Sarsfield's

- Cork Senior Hurling Championship: 2008, 2010, 2012, 2014
- Cork Minor Hurling Championship: 2007

Passage

- City Junior A Hurling Championship: 2021

Cork

- Munster Senior Hurling Championship: 2014
