= 1971 All-Ireland Minor Hurling Championship =

All-Ireland Minor Hurling Championship 1971
Championship Details
- Dates: 16 May - 5 September 1971
- Teams: 11

All Ireland Champions
- Winners: Cork (11th win)
- Captain: John Buckley

All Ireland Runners-up
- Runners-up: Kilkenny

Provincial Champions
- Munster: Cork
- Leinster: Kilkenny
- Ulster: Down
- Connacht: Not Played

Championship Statistics
- Matches Played: 12
- Total Goals: 89 (7.41 per game)
- Total Points: 242 (20.16 per game)
- Top Scorer: Pat Buckley (4-28)

The 1971 All-Ireland Minor Hurling Championship was the 41st staging of the All-Ireland Minor Hurling Championship since its establishment by the Gaelic Athletic Association in 1928. The championship ran from 16 May to 5 September 1971.

Cork entered the championship as the defending champions.

The All-Ireland final was played at Croke Park in Dublin on 5 September 1971 between Cork and Kilkenny, in what was their fifth All-Ireland final meeting overall and a first in two years. Cork won the match by 2-11 o 1-11 to claim their 11th All-Ireland title overall and a third title in succession.

Cork's Pat Buckley was the championship's top scorer with 4-28.

== Format change ==
Antrim moved provinces to participate in the Leinster Championship. The Ulster Championship continued to be held as a standalone competition, with the winners participating in a special lower-tier All-Ireland Championship.

== Leinster Minor Hurling Championship ==
=== Leinster preliminary round ===
| 16 May 1971 Preliminary round | Laois | 4-11 - 5-05 | Dublin | O'Connor Park |
| | E LaCumber 1-7, M Brophy 1-3, A Shortall 1-0, E Jones 1-0, S Bergin 0-1. | | M Holden 1-4, B Pocock 1-1, M Sievers 1-0, B Dwyer 1-0, A Coyle 1-0. |

=== Leinster first round ===
| 27 June 1971 First round | Laois | 7-11 - 6-10 | Antrim | Croke Park |
| | M Buggy 2-1, P Dunphy 2-1, K Flynn 2-0, E LaCumber 1-2, P Brophy 0-4, C Jones 0-2, T Bowe 0-1. | | J Crossey 2-4, S McGourtney 2-1, L Feeney 1-1, M Denny 1-0, J O'Neill 0-2, P Keane 0-2. |

| 4 July 1971 First round | Offaly | 5-17 - 4-02 | Kildare | O'Moore Park |
| | J Hayes 3-0, T Parlon 1-4, J Sheeran 0-6, T Doolan 1-0, F Grehan 0-3, L Landy 0-2, K Mooney 0-1, E Dolphin 0-1. | | P O'Keeffe 1-1, W Sullivan 1-0, S Butler 1-0, F Stynes 1-0, P Lalor 0-1. |

=== Leinster semi-finals ===
| 11 July 1971 Semi-final | Kilkenny | 5-20 - 4-06 | Laois | Croke Park |
| | E Houlihan 2-5, P Mulcahy 1-7, Paddy Butler 1-2, P Kearney 1-0, Pat Butler 0-3, J McCormack 0-3. | | E LaCumber 1-1, J Flynn 1-0, T Bowe 1-0, M Brophy 1-0, S Bergin 0-2, S Martin 0-1, C Jones 0-1, D O'Keeffe 0-1. |

| 11 July 1971 Semi-final | Wexford | 0-19 - 2-05 | Offaly | Croke Park |
| | J Murphy 0-5, P Kehoe 0-4, B Dempsey 0-3, M Hickey 0-2, N Walshe 0-2, E Waters 0-2, PJ Harris 0-1. | | J Sheeran 1-2, G Murray 1-1, P Bennett 0-1, K Mooney 0-1. |

=== Leinster final ===
| 25 July 1971 Final | Kilkenny | 7-18 - 3-05 | Wexford | Croke Park |
| | P Mulcahy 2-5, P Butler 2-4, P Butler (James Stephens) 2-1, E Houlihan 1-2, R Sweeney 0-2, T Kearney 0-2, T Barry 0-2. | | N Walshe 2-0, J Murphy 1-0, P O'Neill 0-2, R Walshe 0-1, E Waters 0-1, B Dempsey 0-1. | Referee: D Doody (Dublin) |

== Munster Minor Hurling Championship ==
=== Munster quarter-final ===
| 29 June 1971 Quarter-final | Limerick | 4-05 - 2-09 | Waterford | Páirc Mac Gearailt |
| | N Chawke 1-3, F Connoly 1-2, N Mitchell 1-0, N Neville 1-0. | | T Casey 1-3, P McGrath 1-1, S Treacy 0-3, P Egan 0-2. |

=== Munster semi-finals ===
| 4 July 1971 Semi-final | Cork | 10-17 - 1-05 | Limerick | Semple Stadium |
| | P Buckley 1-9, E O'Sullivan 2-2, J Barry-Murphy 2-0, V Twomey 2-0, S Coughlan 1-2, S O'Donovan 1-1, D Dwyer 1-1, J Buckley 0-1, B Cotter 0-1. | | F Connolly 0-4, P Neville 1-0, E Tuohy 0-1. |

| 11 July 1971 Semi-final | Clare | 2-13 - 1-07 | Tipperary | Gaelic Grounds |
| | C Honan 2-1, M O'Connell 0-5, J Treacy 1-0, M Gough 0-3, M McKeogh 0-1, B Ryan 0-1, M Moroney 0-1, S O'Hehir 0-1. | | M Waters 1-0, S Barry 0-3, J Keane 0-1. |

=== Munster final ===
| 25 July 1971 Final | Cork | 6-13 - 3-05 | Clare | Gaelic Grounds |
| | T Fogary 2-0, P Buckley 0-6, D Dwyer 1-1, B Cotter 1-1, T Canavan 0-4, J Barry-Murphy 1-0, E O'Sullivan 1-0, J Buckley 0-1. | | M O'Connell 1-2, J Treacy 1-0, M Keogh 1-0, J Callinan 0-1, M Gough 0-1, S O'Hehir 0-1. |

== All-Ireland Minor Hurling Championship ==
=== All-Ireland semi-final ===
| 15 August 1971 Semi-final | Cork | 4-13 - 1-04 | Galway | St. Brendan's Park |
| | P Buckley 1-8, E O'Sullivan 2-1, J Barry-Murphy 1-0, T Fogarty 0-3, S Coughlan 0-1. | | L Mulvey 1-1, G Holland 0-2, J Grealish 0-1. | Referee: G Kirwan (Offaly) |

=== All-Ireland final ===
| 5 September 1971 Final | Cork | 2-11 - 1-11 | Kilkenny | Croke Park |
| | P Buckley 2-5, T Canavan 0-2, T Fogarty 0-2, E O'Sullivan 0-2. | | PJ Butler 1-1, B Cody 0-3, E Houlihan 0-3, N Minogue 0-2, Pat Butler 0-1, T Barry 0-1. | Referee: M Spain (Offaly) |

== Championship statistics ==
Overall

| Rank | Player | Team | Tally | Total | Matches | Average |
|---|---|---|---|---|---|---|
| 1 | Pat Buckley | Cork | 4-28 | 40 | 4 | 10.00 |
| 2 | Pat Mulcahy | Kilkenny | 3-12 | 21 | 2 | 10.50 |
| 3 | Éamonn O'Sullivan | Cork | 5-05 | 20 | 4 | 5.00 |
| 4 | Pat Butler | Kilkenny | 4-07 | 19 | 3 | 6.33 |
| 4 | Eddie Holohan | Kilkenny | 3-10 | 19 | 3 | 6.33 |
| 4 | Eugene La Cumbre | Laois | 3-10 | 19 | 3 | 6.33 |
| 7 | Jimmy Barry-Murphy | Cork | 4-00 | 12 | 4 | 3.00 |
| 8 | Tom Fogarty | Cork | 2-05 | 11 | 3 | 3.33 |
| 8 | Joe Sheeran | Offaly | 1-08 | 11 | 2 | 5.50 |
| 10 | John Crossey | Antrim | 2-04 | 10 | 1 | 10.00 |
| 10 | Haulie O'Connell | Clare | 1-07 | 10 | 2 | 5.00 |

In a single game

| Rank | Player | Team | Tally | Total | Opposition |
|---|---|---|---|---|---|
| 1 | Pat Buckley | Cork | 1-09 | 12 | Limerick |
| 2 | Eddie Holohan | Kilkenny | 2-05 | 11 | Laois |
| 2 | Pat Mulcahy | Kilkenny | 2-05 | 11 | Wexford |
| 2 | Pat Buckley | Cork | 2-05 | 11 | Kilkenny |
| 2 | Pat Buckley | Cork | 1-08 | 11 | Kilkenny |
| 6 | John Crossey | Antrim | 2-04 | 10 | Laois |
| 6 | Pat Butler | Kilkenny | 2-04 | 10 | Wexford |
| 6 | Eugene La Cumbre | Laois | 1-07 | 10 | Dublin |
| 6 | Pat Mulcahy | Kilkenny | 1-07 | 10 | Laois |
| 10 | John Hayes | Offaly | 3-00 | 9 | Kildare |

=== Miscellaneous ===
- Cork equalled Tipperary's record by winning a sixth consecutive Munster Championship.
