= Pat Horgan =

Irish hurler

Personal information
- Born: 1957 (age 68–69) Blackpool, Cork, Ireland
- Occupation: Post office technician
- Height: 6 ft 1 in (185 cm)

Sport
- Sport: Hurling
- Position: Centre-forward
Club
- Years: Club
- 1975-1993: Glen Rovers
Club titles
- Cork titles: 2
- Munster titles: 1
- All-Ireland Titles: 1
Inter-county
| Years | County | Apps (scores) |
| 1977-1988 | Cork | 22 (2-41) |
Inter-county titles
- Munster titles: 8
- All-Irelands: 3
- NHL: 2
- All Stars: 2

Patrick Horgan (born 1957) is an Irish hurler who played as a forward for the Cork senior team.

Horgan joined the team during the 1977 championship and was a regular member of the starting fifteen until his retirement after the 1988 championship. During that time he won three All-Ireland medals as a non-playing substitute, six Munster medals, two National League medals and two All-Star awards. Horgan was an All-Ireland runner-up on two occasions.

At club level Horgan was a one-time All-Ireland medalist with Glen Rovers. In addition to this he has also won one Munster medal and two county club championship medals.

== Honours ==
=== Team ===
Glen Rovers

- All-Ireland Senior Club Hurling Championship (1): 1977
- Munster Senior Club Hurling Championship (1): 1976
- Cork Senior Club Hurling Championship (2): 1976, 1989

Cork

- All-Ireland Senior Hurling Championship (3): 1977 (sub), 1978 (sub), 1984 (sub)
- Munster Senior Hurling Championship (8): 1977, 1978, 1979, 1982, 1983, 1984, 1985, 1986
- National Hurling League (2): 1979-80, 1980-81
- All-Ireland Under-21 Hurling Championship (1): 1976
- Munster Under-21 Hurling Championship (2): 1976, 1977
- All-Ireland Minor Hurling Championship (1): 1974
- Munster Minor Hurling Championship (2): 1974, 1975

Munster

- Railway Cup (2): 1981, 1984 (sub)
