= Mick Cashman =

Irish hurler (1931–1988)

Personal information
- Native name: Mícheál Ó Cíosáin (Irish)
- Born: 1931 Blackrock, Cork, Ireland
- Died: 17 September 1988 (aged 56–57) Blackrock, Cork

Sport
- Sport: Hurling
- Position: Goalkeeper
Club
- Years: Club
- 1950–1967: Blackrock
Club titles
- Cork titles: 2
Inter-county*
Years	County	Apps (scores)
1950–1962	Cork	17 (0–00)
Inter-county titles
- Munster titles: 3
- All-Irelands: 2
- NHL: 1
- *Inter County team apps and scores correct as of 22:01, 11 September 2014.

Michael Cashman (1931 – 17 September 1988) was an Irish hurler who played as a goalkeeper for the Cork senior team.

Born in Blackrock, Cork, Cashman first arrived on the inter-county scene at the age of seventeen when he first linked up with the Cork minor team before later joining the junior side. He joined the senior team during the 1951 championship. Cashman went on to enjoy a decade-long inter-county career and won two Munster medals and one National Hurling League medal. He was an All-Ireland runner-up on one occasion.

As a member of the Munster inter-provincial team on a number of occasions, Cashman won six Railway Cup medals. At club level he won two championship medals with Blackrock.

His brother-in-law, Jimmy Brohan, was a contemporary on the Cork hurling team, while his sons, Tom and Jim, enjoyed All-Ireland success with Cork. His grandson, Niall Cashman, currently plays with Cork.

Throughout his career Cashman made 17 championship appearances. His retirement came following the conclusion of the 1962 championship.

== Playing career ==
=== Club ===
In 1956 Cashman was captain of the Blackrock senior hurling team that reached the final of the county championship. A 2–10 to 2–2 defeat of northside kingpins Glen Rovers gave Cashmna his first championship medal.

After losing to the same opposition in 1959, Blackrock reached the decider once again in 1961. Cashman was captain for a second time as the Rockies defeated divisional side Avondhu by 4–10 to 3–7.

=== Inter-county ===
Cashman first came to prominence on the inter-county scene as a member of the Cork senior team in the early 1950s. After Tom Mulcahy retired from inter-county hurling after the 1951 championship Cashman became Cork's new goalkeeper. Success, however, was slow in coming. In 1952 Cashman was struck down with tonsilitis just before the start of the championship and was forced to withdraw from the starting fifteen. Former sub 'keeper Dave Creedon was recalled and proved so effective in goal that he succeeded in displacing Cashman as the first-choice goalkeeper for a number of years.

There was some success for Cashman. He came on as a substitute in the 1953 league final as Cork defeated Tipperary to take the National Hurling League title. He was still relegated to the subs' bench for the subsequent championship campaign.

In 1954 Tipperary fell to Cork by 2–8 to 1–8 in the provincial final. Cashman played as a half-back in that game to collect his first Munster title on the field of play. He played no part in Cork's subsequent All-Ireland final victory.

Cork lost their provincial crown in 1955 and Dave Creedon retired from inter-county hurling. This opened the door for Cashman to return as first-choice goalkeeper for the following year. In 1956 Cork reached the Munster final once again. Limerick provided the opposition on that occasion, however, Cork recorded a 5–5 o 3–5 victory. It was Cashman's second Munster winners' medal on the field of play. Cork later lined out in the All-Ireland final with Wexford providing the opposition. The game has gone down in history as one of the all-time classic games as Christy Ring was bidding for a record ninth All-Ireland medal. The game turned on one important incident as the Wexford goalkeeper, Art Foley, made a miraculous save from a Ring shot and cleared the sliotar up the field to set up another attack. Wexford went on to win the game on a score line of 2–14 to 2–8 and Cashman was left with a runners-up medal.

In 1957 Cashman was appointed captain of his native-county’s senior hurling team. Once again Cork reached the Munster final, however, they were defeated by Waterford on a score line of 1–11 to 1–6. Cashman’s side contested three consecutive provincial finals in 1959, 1960 and 1961, however, he ended up on the losing side on every occasion. He served as captain of the team again in 1962, however, he retired from inter-county hurling following Cork's early exit from the championship.

=== Inter-provincial ===
Cashman also lined out with Munster in the inter-provincial hurling competition and enjoyed much success. He first lined out with his province as captain in 1957 and guided Munster to a 5–7 to 2–5 victory over Leinster. This was the first of five consecutive Railway Cup victories for Cashman a spart of the Munster team. He won a sixth and final Railway Cup winners' medal in 1963 as Munster accounted for Leinster by just a single point.

== Post-playing career ==
In retirement from hurling Cashman came to be regarded as one of Cork's greatest players never to win an All-Ireland medal. Although he never achieved this distinction himself he did live to see his two sons have much success on the hurling field with both Blackrock and Cork. In 1986 both Jim and Tom Cashman won senior All-Ireland medals with Cork.

Mick Cashman died in 1988.

Sporting positions
Preceded by Tony O'Shaughnessy	Cork Senior Hurling Captain; 1957	Succeeded by Paddy Barry
Preceded by Christy Ring	Cork Senior Hurling Captain; 1962	Succeeded by Mick McCarthy
Achievements
Preceded by Nick O'Donnell (Leinster)	Railway Cup Hurling Final winning captain 1957	Succeeded by Phil Grimes (Munster)
