= Mick Archer =

Irish Gaelic football player

Personal information
- Native name: Mícheál Mac Arcail (Irish)
- Born: 20 April 1943 Ballyphehane, Cork, Ireland
- Died: 28 October 2018 (aged 75) Wilton, Cork, Ireland

Sport
- Sport: Gaelic football & Hurling
- Position: Full-forward
Club
- Years: Club
- St Finbarr's
Club titles
- Cork titles: 3
- Munster titles: 3
Inter-county*
Years	County	Apps (scores)
1965	Cork	0 (0-00)
Inter-county titles
- Munster titles: 0
- All-Irelands: 2
- NFL: 0
- *Inter County team apps and scores correct as of 01:49, 15 July 2014.

Michael Archer (1943 – 28 October 2018) was an Irish Gaelic footballer who played as a right corner-forward at senior level for the Cork county team.

Born in Ballyphehane, Cork, Archer first played competitive football in his youth. He arrived on the inter-county scene at the age of seventeen when he first linked up with the Cork minor team, before later joining the under-21 side. He joined the senior panel during the 1965 championship and enjoyed a brief one-year inter-county career.

At club level Archer was a three-time Munster medallist with the St Finbarr's senior hurlers. In addition to this he also won three championship medals.

== Honours ==
St Finbarr's

- Munster Senior Club Hurling Championship (3): 1965, 1968, 1974
- Cork Senior Hurling Championship (3): 1965, 1968, 1974

Cork

- All-Ireland Minor Football Championship (1): 1961
- Munster Minor Football Championship (1): 1961
