= Jim Cashman (hurler) =

Irish hurler (born 1965)

Personal information
- Native name: Séamus Ó Cíosáin (Irish)
- Nickname: Cash
- Born: 9 June 1965 (age 61) Blackrock, Cork, Ireland
- Occupation: Sales representative
- Height: 6 ft 1 in (185 cm)

Sport
- Sport: Hurling
- Position: Centre-back
Club
- Years: Club
- Blackrock
Club titles
- Cork titles: 2
Inter-county*
Years	County	Apps (scores)
1985–1996	Cork	29 (0-09)
Inter-county titles
- Munster titles: 3
- All-Irelands: 2
- NHL: 1
- All Stars: 2
- *Inter County team apps and scores correct as of 14:15, 5 July 2015.

James Cashman (born 9 June 1965) is an Irish retired hurler who played as a centre-back for the Cork senior team.

Born in Blackrock, Cork, Cashman first played competitive hurling during his schooling at Coláiste Chríost Rí. He arrived on the inter-county scene at the age of sixteen when he first linked up with the Cork minor team before later joining the under-21 side. He made his senior debut during the 1985 Oireachtas Cup. Cashman subsequently became a regular member of the starting fifteen and won two All-Ireland medals, three Munster medals and one National Hurling League medal. He was an All-Ireland runner-up on one occasion.

As a member of the Munster inter-provincial team on a number of occasions, Cashman won one Railway Cup medal. At club level he is a two-time championship medallist with Blackrock.

Cashman's father, Mick Cashman, his uncle, Jimmy Brohan, and his brother, Tom Cashman, all played for Cork.

Throughout his career Cashman made 29 championship appearances. His retirement came following the conclusion of the 1996 championship.

In retirement from playing Cashman became involved in team management and coaching. At club level he has been involved in coaching at underage levels with Blackrock.

Cashman is regarded as one of Cork's best players of his era. During his playing days he won two All-Star awards. Cashman was also chosen as one of the 25 best Cork players of the past 25 years in a 2013 poll.

== Playing career ==
=== Club ===
After enjoying little championship success in the minor and under-21 grades with Blackrock, Cashman subsequently joined the senior team. In 1985 Blackrock faced Midleton in the championship decider. Cashman, in the company of his brother Tom, Michael Browne, Kilkennyman Frank Cummins, Éamonn O'Donoghue and Finbarr Delaney, gave a masterful display. A 1–14 to 1–8 victory gave Cashman, who also earned the man of the match award, a first championship medal.

After failing to retain the title Blackrock went into a period of decline. After losing the 1998 decider to Imokilly, Cashman lined out in a fourth championship decider the following year. A 3–17 to 0–8 trouncing of University College Cork, with Cashman giving a man of the match display again, gave him a second championship medal.

=== Inter-county ===
Cashman first played for Cork as a goalkeeper on the minor team on 16 May 1981 in a 2–6 to 0–6 Munster semi-final defeat by Clare. He was moved to centre-back the following year before being dropped to the substitutes' bench in his final year as a minor in 1983.

In 1985 Cashman joined the Cork under-21 team, however, his two-year tenure in this grade ended without success.

Cashman made his senior debut for Cork on 10 November 1985 in a 2–11 to 1–10 Oireachtas final defeat of Galway. He was a regular throughout the subsequent league campaign and was included in Cork's championship team in 1986. Cork made it five-in-a-row in Munster that year as they defeated Clare by 2–18 to 3–12 to take the provincial title. It was Cashman's first Munster medal. This victory paved the way for an All-Ireland final meeting with Galway on 7 September 1986. The men from the west were the red-hot favourites against a Cork team in decline, however, on the day a different story unfolded. Four Cork goals, one from John Fenton, two from Tomás Mulcahy and one from Kevin Hennessy, stymied the Galway attack and helped the Rebels to a 4–13 to 2–15 victory. It was Cashman's first All-Ireland medal.

In 1990 Cork bounced back after a period in decline. He won his second Munster medal that year following a 4–16 to 2–14 defeat of Tipperary. The subsequent All-Ireland final on 2 September 1990 pitted Cork against Galway for the second time in four years. Galway were once again the red-hot favourites and justified this tag by going seven points ahead in the opening thirty-five minutes thanks to a masterful display by Cashman's opposite number Joe Cooney. Cork fought back with an equally expert display by captain Tomás Mulcahy. The game was effectively decided on an incident which occurred midway through the second half when Cork goalkeeper Ger Cunningham blocked a point-blank shot from Martin Naughton with his nose. The umpires gave no 65-metre free, even though he clearly deflected it out wide. Cork went on to win a high-scoring and open game of hurling by 5–15 to 2–21. As well as winning a second All-Ireland medal Cashman was later presented with a first All-Star.

Cork surrendered their All-Ireland crown to Tipperary in 1991, however, in spite of an early championship exit Cashman finished the year with a second All-Star.

In 1992 Cashman claimed a third Munster medal following a 1–22 to 3–11 of Limerick. On 6 September 1992 Cork faced Kilkenny in the All-Ireland decider. At half-time Cork were two points ahead, however, two second-half goals by John Power and Michael "Titch" Phelan supplemented a first-half D. J. Carey penalty which gave Kilkenny a 3–10 to 1–12 victory.

Cashman won a National Hurling League medal in 1993 following a 3–11 to 1–12 defeat of Wexford.

After unsuccessful championship campaigns over the following three years, Cashman retired from inter-county hurling following Cork's exit from the 1996 championship.

=== Inter-provincial ===
Cashman was first picked for the Munster inter-provincial team in 1987, however, Munster's campaign ended at the semi-final stage. He made it onto the starting fifteen in 1991, however, Munster fell to an all-Galway Connacht team by 1–13 to 0–12 in the decider.

In 1992 Cashman was at centre-back as Munster faced Ulster in the decider. A 3–12 to 1–8 victory gave Cashman a Railway Cup medal.

== Honours ==
=== Player ===
Blackrock

- Cork Senior Hurling Championship (2): 1985, 1999

Cork

- All-Ireland Senior Hurling Championship (2): 1986, 1990
- Munster Senior Hurling Championship (3): 1986, 1990, 1992
- National Hurling League (1): 1992–93
- Oireachtas Tournament (1): 1985

Munster

- Railway Cup (1): 1992

=== Individual ===
Honours

- All-Star (2): 1990, 1991
