= Patsy Harte =

Irish hurler

Personal information
- Native name: Pádraig Ó hAirtrí (Irish)
- Born: 1940 (age 85–86) Blackpool, Cork, Ireland

Sport
- Sport: Hurling
- Position: Left wing-forward
Club
- Years: Club
- Glen Rovers
Club titles
- Cork titles: 6
- Munster titles: 3
- All-Ireland Titles: 2
Inter-county
Years	County	Apps (scores)
1962-1966	Cork	8 (3-28)
Inter-county titles
- Munster titles: 0
- All-Irelands: 0
- NHL: 0

Patsy Harte (born 1940 in Blackpool, Cork) is a former Irish sportsperson. He played hurling with his local club Glen Rovers and was a member of the Cork senior inter-county team from 1962 until 1966. He is known for his ferocious pace and his lethal finishing. His son Niall carried on his fantastic legacy and Grandson Conor follow.
