= 1973 All-Ireland Under-21 Hurling Championship =

All-Ireland Under-21 Hurling Championship 1973
All Ireland Champions
- Winners: Cork (6th win)
- Captain: Martin O'Doherty

All Ireland Runners-up
- Runners-up: Wexford

Provincial Champions
- Munster: Cork
- Leinster: Wexford
- Ulster: Antrim
- Connacht: Not Played

The 1973 All-Ireland Under-21 Hurling Championship was the 10th staging of the All-Ireland Under-21 Hurling Championship since its establishment by the Gaelic Athletic Association in 1964.

Galway were the defending champions, however, they were defeated by Cork in the All-Ireland semi-final.

On 11 November 1973, Cork won the championship following a 2–10 to 4–2 defeat of Wexford in the All-Ireland final. This was their sixth All-Ireland title in the grade and their fifth in six championship seasons.

== Munster Under-21 Hurling Championship ==
=== Munster quarter-finals ===
26 April 1973 Quarter-final	Waterford	2-08 - 3-09	Cork	Cappoquin Sportsfield
	T Hunt 1-1, B Landers 1-1, T Reid 0-4, L Power 0-1, J Galvin 0-1.		T Sheehan 3-6, S O'Leary 0-3.	Referee: J Moloney (Waterford)

2 May 1973 Quarter-final	Tipperary	1-09 - 1-05	Clare	MacDonagh Park
				Referee: S O'Grady (Limerick)

=== Munster semi-finals ===
4 July 1973 Semi-final	Tipperary	2-08 - 2-09	Cork	Semple Stadium
	J Kehoe 0-6, M Young 1-0, P Fanning 1-0, J Kane 0-1, J Sherlock 0-1.		T Sheehan 0-6, D Relihan 1-1, J Barry-Murphy 1-0, S O'Leary 0-2.

v

=== Munster final ===
8 August 1973 Final	Cork	4-11 - 2-07	Limerick	Dr. Mannix Sportsfield
	T Sheehan 2-5, D Relihan 2-2, J Barry-Murphy 0-1, S O'Leary 0-1, J Buckley 0-1, T Crowley 0-1.		F Ryan 1-2, D O'Sullivan 1-0, V O'Donoghue 0-3, J Curtin 0-1, B Neenan 0-1.	Referee: J Moloney (Tipperary)

== All-Ireland Under-21 Hurling Championship ==
=== All-Ireland semi-finals ===
12 August 1973 Semi-final	Wexford	2-09 - 0-07 (match abandoned)	Antrim	Wexford Park

28 October 1973 Semi-final refixture	Galway	1-08 - 2-16	Cork	Pearse Stadium
	G Holland 1-0, I Clarke 0-2, M Connolly 0-2, M Coen 0-2, PJ Molloy 0-2.		S O'Leary 2-14, S Buckley 0-1, T Murphy 0-1.

=== All-Ireland final ===
11 November 1973 Final	Cork	2-10 - 4-02	Wexford	Páirc Dáibhín
	S O'Leary 0-5, T Fogarty 1-1, T Sheehan 1-0, P Kavanagh 0-3, J Barry-Murphy 0-1.		J Allen 2-0, S Storey 1-0, N Walsh 1-0, PJ Harris 0-2.	Referee: J Moloney (Tipperary)

== Championship statistics ==
=== Miscellaneous ===
- The All-Ireland semi-final between Wexford and Antrim was abandoned by the referee ten minutes from the end when a fracas broke out. An official from the Antrim County Board also refused to cooperate with journalists after claiming that his team were afforded a poor reception at Wexford Park.
- The All-Ireland semi-final between Cork and Galway was postponed twice before eventually being played on 28 October 1971.
