= Donal Clifford =

Irish hurler

Personal information
- Native name: Dónall Ó Clúmháin (Irish)
- Born: 1948 (age 77–78) Cloyne, County Cork, Ireland
- Occupation: General manager
- Height: 5 ft 10 in (178 cm)

Sport
- Sport: Hurling
- Position: Right wing-back
Clubs
- Years: Club
- 1965-1975 1966-1967; 1969 1968; 1970; 1972-1974 1976-1978: Cloyne → University College Cork → Imokilly; Glen Rovers
Club titles
- Cork titles: 1
- Munster titles: 1
- All-Ireland Titles: 1
College
- Years: College
- 1965-1969: University College Cork
College titles
- Fitzgibbon titles: 2
Inter-county
Years	County	Apps (scores)
1969-1973	Cork	10 (0-01)
Inter-county titles
- Munster titles: 2
- All-Irelands: 1
- NHL: 2
- All Stars: 0

Daniel J. Clifford (born 1948), better known as Donal Clifford, is an Irish former hurler and manager. At club level he played with Cloyne and Glen Rovers and was also a member of the Cork senior hurling team. Regarded as one of Cork's greatest ever underage players, Clifford was the first player to wear protective headgear in a senior inter-county match.

== Early career ==
Born and raised in Cloyne, County Cork, Clifford first played as a schoolboy at Midleton CBS Secondary School. He was a member the school's teams that won the Dr. Coholan Cup, the Dr. Rodgers Cup and the Corn Phádraig treble in 1963 before later lining out in the Dr. Harty Cup. After beginning his studies at University College Cork in 1965, Clifford immediately began a four-year association with the senior hurling team. During that time he won successive Fitzgibbon Cup titles in 1966 and 1967, while he was on the beaten side in the finals of 1968 and 1969.

== Club career ==
Clifford began a long association with the Cloyne club as a juvenile and underage player. He joined the club's intermediate team as a 17-year-old in 1965 before taking over the captaincy the following year when Cloyne secured the Cork IHC title. In spite of Cloyne becoming a senior club in 1967, Clifford declared for University College Cork. He was part of the Imokilly divisional team that was beaten by St. Finbarr's in the 1968 final, but was back with UCC a year later when they lost out to Glen Rovers in the 1969 final.

Clifford won a second Cork IHC title with Cloyne in 1970, however, the club soon found itself in the East Cork JAHC after a number of regradings. The club's fortunes were also hampered by Clifford moving to London where he worked with Ford Dagenham. He transferred to the Glen Rovers club in Blackpool in 1976 and was part of their Cork SHC title-winning team that year. Clifford's first season with the Glen concluded with an All-Ireland club final defeat of Camross. He continued to line out with Glen Rovers until 1978 when he effectively retired from the game.

== Inter-county career ==
Clifford was just 16-years-old when he began a three-year association with the Cork minor hurling team. His debut season in the grade ended with All-Ireland success, after a personal scoring tally of 2-03 in the final. After failing to retain their title, Cork qualified for a second final in three seasons in 1966 and ended up drawing with Wexford. Clifford's performance earned an immediate call-up to the Cork under-21 team which were also due to play Wexford in the 1966 All-Ireland under-21 final. He was sent off in that game and was suspended for both the minor and under-21 replays. In spite of the abrupt end to Clifford's minor career, he had another three years of eligibility for the under-21 team. He ended his under-21 career with consecutive All-Ireland victories in 1968 and 1969.

After being drafted onto the Cork senior hurling team for the latter stage of the 1968-69 National League, Clifford made his senior debut in the semi-final defeat of Tipperary. As well as making his first appearance for Cork, he also became the first player to wear a protective helmet in a senior-inter-county match. Clifford missed the league final through injury but was a first-team regular for Cork's subsequent Munster Championship-winning campaign. He subsequently lined out at centre-back in the 1969 All-Ireland final defeat by Kilkenny.

Clifford won a second consecutive National League title in 1970 before securing a second consecutive Munster Championship after a defeat of Tipperary in the final. He was switched from centre-back to right wing-back for the subsequent series of games and ended the season with All-Ireland success after a 6-21 to 5-10 win over Wexford in the 1970 All-Ireland final.

A series of injuries, including a broken ankle and two broken fingers, a loss of overall form and a transfer to Dublin in his working life resulted in Clifford playing no championship hurling for Cork over the next two seasons. He was recalled to the panel in January 1973 and made a number of appearances in the league and other tournament and challenge games. He played his last game for Cork in a defeat by Tipperary in the 1973 Munster Championship.

== Inter-provincial career ==
Clifford's performances at inter-county level resulted in his selection for Munster in their 1970 Railway Cup final defeat of Leinster.

== Coaching career ==
Clifford was appointed coach of the Cloyne senior team in January 2003. That season he helped guide the team to their first ever semi-final where they were beaten by Blackrock. Clifford later took charge of the Cobh intermediate team.

== Honours ==
University College Cork

- Fitzgibbon Cup: 1966, 1967

Cloyne

- Cork Intermediate Hurling Championship: 1966 (c), 1970

Glen Rovers

- All-Ireland Senior Club Hurling Championship: 1977
- Munster Senior Club Hurling Championship: 1976
- Cork Senior Hurling Championship: 1976

Cork

- All-Ireland Senior Hurling Championship: 1970
- Munster Senior Hurling Championship: 1969, 1970
- National Hurling League: 1968-69, 1969-70
- All-Ireland Under-21 Hurling Championship: 1966, 1968, 1969
- Munster Under-21 Hurling Championship: 1966, 1968, 1969
- All-Ireland Minor Hurling Championship: 1964
- Munster Minor Hurling Championship: 1964, 1966

Munster

- Railway Cup: 1970
