= Paddy Ring =

Irish hurler (1950–2020)

Personal information
- Native name: Pádraig Ó Rinn (Irish)
- Born: 1950 Cloyne, County Cork, Ireland
- Died: 31 May 2020 (aged 69) Cloyne, County Cork, Ireland
- Occupation: Carpenter

Sport
- Sport: Hurling
- Position: Left corner-forward
Clubs
- Years: Club
- Cloyne → Imokilly; Glen Rovers
Club titles
- Cork titles: 0
Inter-county
| Years | County | Apps (scores) |
| 1970–1971 | Cork | 0 (0-00) |
Inter-county titles
- Munster titles: 0
- All-Irelands: 0
- NHL: 0
- All Stars: 0

Patrick J. Ring (1950 – 31 May 2020) was an Irish hurler. At club level he played with Cloyne and Glen Rovers, divisional side Imokilly and at inter-county level with Cork.

== Career ==
Ring first played hurling as a student at Midleton CBS. He was captain of both the college's junior and senior teams that enjoyed provincial success in 1966. It was also a successful year at club level, as the 16-year-old Ring won a Cork IHC medal with Cloyne. He was later a member of the Imokilly divisional team that lost out to St. Finbarr's in the 1968 final, before claiming a second IHC winners' medal after scoring 0–12 in the defeat of Castletownrohche.

Ring first appeared on the inter-county scene with Cork as a member of the minor team beaten by Wexford in the 1966 All-Ireland final replay. It was the first of three successive All-Ireland final meetings with Wexford, with Ring claiming a winners' medal in 1967. He was still in his final year with the minor team when he was drafted onto the under-21 team for the 1968 All-Ireland final defeat of Kilkenny. Ring won a second All-Ireland U21HC winners' medal in 1970.

After being a member of Cork's intermediate team for a brief period in 1969, Ring made the senior team during the 1970–71 National League campaign. He was recalled to the intermediate team in 1971.

Ring transferred to the Glen Rovers club in 1980. He made consecutive SHC final appearances in 1980 and 1981, however, he ended on the losing side on both occasions.

== Personal life and death ==
Ring was born in Cloyne, County Cork 1950. His father, Willie John Ring, played with Cork in 1940, however, a knee injury later ended his career. His uncle, Christy Ring, won eight All-Ireland SHC medals and is regarded by many as one of the greatest players of all time.

Ring died suddenly on 31 May 2020, at the age of 69.

== Honours ==
Midleton CBS

- Corn Phádraig: 1966 (c)
- Dr. Rodgers Cup: 1966 (c)

Cloyne

- Cork Intermediate Hurling Championship: 1966, 1970

Cork

- All-Ireland Under-21 Hurling Championship: 1968, 1970
- Munster Under-21 Hurling Championship: 1968, 1970
- All-Ireland Minor Hurling Championship: 1967
- Munster Minor Hurling Championship: 1966, 1967, 1968
