= Willie Walsh (hurler, born 1948) =

Irish hurler

Personal information
- Native name: Liam Breathnach (Irish)
- Born: 1948 (age 77–78) Youghal, County Cork, Ireland
- Height: 5 ft 10 in (178 cm)

Sport
- Sport: Hurling
- Position: Centre-forward
Clubs
- Years: Club
- Youghal → Imokilly
Club titles
- Cork titles: 0
Inter-county
Years	County	Apps (scores)
1968-1975	Cork	13 (9-10)
Inter-county titles
- Munster titles: 3
- All-Irelands: 1
- NHL: 3
- All Stars: 0

William Walsh (born 1948) is an Irish retired hurler who played as a centre-forward for the Cork senior team.

Walsh joined the team during the 1968-69 National League and was a regular member of the starting fifteen until his retirement after the 1975 championship. During that time he won one All-Ireland medal, three Munster medals and three National League medals.

At club level, he played with Youghal.

== Playing career ==
=== Club ===
Walsh played his club hurling with Youghal. In 1969, he was a member of the team that reached the final of the intermediate championship. Youghal beat Cobh in the final (3-9 to 0-13), giving Walsh a Cork Intermediate Hurling Championship medal.

=== Minor and under-21 ===
Walsh first played inter-county hurling as a member of the Cork minor hurling team in 1966. He collected a Munster Minor Hurling Championship medal following a 6-7 to 2-8 defeat of Galway. Cork later faced Wexford in the All-Ireland decider, however, a high-scoring 6-7 apiece draw was the result. The replay was much more conclusive with Wexford claiming a 4-1 to 1-8 victory.

By 1968, Walsh had progressed onto the Cork under-21 team. Tipperary were bested by 4-10 to 1-13 to secure his first Munster Under-21 Hurling Championship medal. Walsh was later on the starting fifteen for the All-Ireland decider against Kilkenny. A 2-18 to 3-9 victory gave him a All-Ireland Under-21 Hurling Championship medal.

In 1969, Cork had an even more comprehensive victory over Tipp in the provincial decider and Walsh added a second Munster medal to his collection. Old rivals Wexford provided the opposition in the subsequent All-Ireland final, which Cork won 5-13 to 4-7 and resulted in Walsh's second consecutive All-Ireland medal.

=== Senior ===
Walsh made his senior debut during the successful 1968-69 National League campaign for Cork. A 3-12 to 1-14 defeat of Wexford in the decider gave him his first National Hurling League medal. The subsequent provincial decider pitted Cork against reigning champions Tipperary. A 4-6 to 0-9 victory gave Cork a first defeat of Tipp since 1957 while it also gave Walsh a first Munster Senior Hurling Championship medal. This victory paved the way for an All-Ireland showdown with Kilkenny. During the final, Cork were leading coming into the last quarter, however, Kilkenny scored five unanswered points in the last seven minutes to win by 2-15 to 2-9.

During the 1969-70 National League, an aggregate 5-21 to 6-16 defeat of New York by Cork gave Walsh his second National Hurling League medal. The subsequent championship campaign saw him win his second Munster medal as Tipperary were accounted for by 3-10 to 3-8. Cork later qualified for the All-Ireland final with Wexford providing the opposition in the very first eighty-minute championship decider. The game saw a record 64-point score line for both teams as Cork's Eddie O'Brien scored a hat-trick of goals to give Cork a considerable lead. At the full-time whistle Cork were the winners by 6-21 to 5-10, giving Walsh an All-Ireland Senior Hurling Championship medal.

After being dropped from the team for a number of seasons, Walsh won his third National League medal in 1974 as Cork defeated Limerick on a huge score line of 6-15 to 1-12.

The following year Walsh won his third Munster medal following a 3-14 to 0-12 defeat of reigning provincial champions Limerick. Cork were later defeated by Galway in the All-Ireland semi-final.

=== Inter-provincial ===
Walsh also had the honour of being selected for Munster in the inter-provincial series of games. He made his debut with the province in 1970 and was a regular at various times until his retirement in 1975. He enjoyed little success in this competition as Leinster dominated at the time.

In 1970 Walsh won his sole Railway Cup medal following a 2-15 to 0-9 defeat of Leinster.

== Honours ==
Youghal

- Cork Intermediate Hurling Championship: 1969

Cork

- All-Ireland Senior Hurling Championship: 1970
- Munster Senior Hurling Championship: 1969, 1970, 1975
- National Hurling League: 1968-69, 1969-70, 1973-74
- All-Ireland Under-21 Hurling Championship: 1968, 1969
- Munster Under-21 Hurling Championship: 1968, 1969
- Munster Minor Hurling Championship: 1966

Munster

- Railway Cup: 1970
