= 1968 Cork Senior Hurling Championship =

Annual hurling competition season

- Dates: 28 April – 15 September 1968
- Teams: 15
- Champions: St. Finbarr's (17th title); Jim Power (captain)
- Runners-up: Imokilly; Paddy FitzGerald (captain); Willie John Ring (manager)

Tournament statistics
- Matches played: 13
- Goals scored: 88 (6.77 per match)
- Points scored: 271 (20.85 per match)
- Top scorer(s): Charlie McCarthy (5-21)

The 1968 Cork Senior Hurling Championship was the 80th staging of the Cork Senior Hurling Championship since its establishment by the Cork County Board in 1887. The championship began on 28 April 1968 and ended on 13 September 1968.

Glen Rovers were the defending champions, however, they withdrew from the championship at the semi-final stage.

On 13 September 1968, St. Finbarr's won the championship following a 5–9 to 1–19 defeat of Imokilly in the final. This was their 17th championship title overall and their first in three championship seasons.

Charlie McCarthy from the St. Finbarr's club was the championship's top scorer with 5-21.

== Team changes ==
=== To Championship ===
Promoted from the Cork Intermediate Hurling Championship

- Ballincollig

== Results ==
=== First round ===
28 April 1968 First round	Avondhu	3-05 - 3-12	University College Cork	Cork Athletic Grounds, Cork
	L Sheehan 1-2, R Browne 1-0, F Sheedy 1-0, J Browne 0-1, R Honohan 0-1, P Behan 0-1.		R Lehane 2-2, J Barrett 1-1, N Rochford 0-3, T Field 0-3, P Dooley 0-2, B Morgan 0-1.	Referee: P Cronin (St. Finbarr's)

28 April 1968 First round	Ballincollig	3-08 - 5-09	Muskerry	Cloughduv
	G Regan 1-5, M Murphy 1-2, J Holmes 1-0, J Sheehy 0-1.		T Ryan 2-2, F Kelleher 1-3, H O'Brien 1-1, J Brennan 1-0, M Malone 0-1, J Kelly 0-1, T Mahony 0-1.

28 April 1968 First round	Na Piarsaigh	3-08 - 4-13	St. Finbarr's	Cork Athletic Grounds, Cork
	J Buckley 1-1, L Joyce 1-1, M O'Mahony 1-0, S Twomey 0-2, D Sheehan 0-2, R Tuohy 0-1, B O'Leary 0-1.		P Freeney 2-3, C McCarthy 1-2, C Roche 0-4, M Archer 1-0, T Connolly 0-2, G McCarthy 0-2.

5 May 1968 First round	Seandún	1-05 - 4-15	Glen Rovers	Cork Athletic Grounds, Cork
	J O'Sullivan 1-1, T McAuliffe 0-2, E Dorney 0-1, P Curley 0-1.		W Carroll 2-1, P Harte 0-6, J Daly 1-2, A Flynn 1-0, S Kennefick 0-3, J Young 0-2, T Corbett 0-1.	Referee: F Murphy (Blackrock)

12 May 1968 First round	Blackrock	6-07 - 3-11	Duhallow	Millstreet
	J Bennett 3-0, D McCarthy 2-1, N O'Keeffe 0-4, M Barry 1-0, M Waters 0-1, J Horgan 0-1.		B Buckley 1-5, TD Cronin 1-3, S Stokes 1-1, J O'Mahony 0-1, B Quinn 0-1.	Referee: D mannix (Mallow)

9 June 1968 First round	Imokilly	6-13 - 1-04	Carbery	Ballinhassig
	P Ring 2-3, N Gallagher 2-3, M Hegarty 1-2, D Daly 1-0, P Fitzgerald 0-2, T Meaney 0-2, W Walsh 0-1, O O'Keeffe 0-1.		F Kehilly 1-0, L Hurley 0-2, J Holland 0-1, P McCarthy 0-1.	Referee: P Cronin (St. Finbarr's)

12 May 1968 First round	Sarsfields	3-06 - 7-12	Passage	Cork Athletic Grounds, Cork
	JJ Long 1-3, P O'Riordan 1-1, D Looney 1-0, S O'Riordan 0-1, N Long 0-1.		J Barry 3-2, J McCarthy 0-8, G O'Sullivan 2-0, B Meade 1-1, J Murphy 1-0, E O'Brien 0-1.

=== Quarter-finals ===
16 June 1968 Quarter-final	Carrigdhoun	4-13 - 2-18	Muskerry	Kinsale
	JK Coleman 2-7, T O'Leary 1-2, S Kelleher 1-0, F Coleman 0-2, D Walsh 0-1, L Webb 0-1.		T Ryan 1-9, M Ryan 0-5, H O'Brien 1-1, J Kelly 0-1, T O'Mahony 0-1, C Kelly 0-1.

7 July 1968 Quarter-final	St. Finbarr's	4-18 - 4-07	Passage	Cork Athletic Grounds, Cork
	C McCarthy 2-5, C Cullinane 1-4, C Roche 1-2, B Kenneally 0-3, P Doolan 0-2, G McCarthy 0-1, B Scully 0-1.		J McCarthy 3-3, E O'Brien 1-0, J Murphy 0-2, B Meade 0-1, J Horan 0-1.	Referee: D O'Brien (Cloyne)

7 July 1968 Quarter-final	Imokilly	5-12 - 2-09	Blackrock	Riverstown
	T Buckley 2-0, M Hegarty 1-3, S Barry 0-6, P Ring 1-1, D Daly 1-0, N Gallagher 0-2.		D McCarthy 2-1, J Bennett 0-2, W Galligan 0-2, N O'Keeffe 0-2, P Moylan 0-1, M Waters 0-1.	Referee: M Walsh (Mayfield)

27 July 1968 Quarter-final	Glen Rovers	0-10 - 0-08	University College Cork	Cork Athletic Grounds, Cork
	P Harte 0-5, B Carroll 0-2, T Buckley 0-2, D Coughlan 0-1.		J O'Halloran 0-2, T Field 0-2, R Cummins 0-2, B Morgan 0-1, H O'Sullivan 0-1.	Referee: F Halbert (Glenville)

=== Semi-finals ===
11 August 1968 Semi-final	St. Finbarr's	5-15 - 4-05	Carrigdhoun	Manning Park, Passage
	C McCarthy 1-9, M Archer 2-2, C Cullinane 1-1, B Kenneally 1-1, B Scully 0-1, G McCarthy 0-1.		JK Coleman 3-1, F Coleman 1-1, D Harrington 0-2, D Coleman 0-1.	Referee: F Murphy (Blackrock)

18 August 1968 Semi-final	Imokilly	w/o - scr.	Glen Rovers	Cork Athletic Grounds, Cork

=== Final ===
15 September 1968 Final	St. Finbarr's	5-09 - 1-19	Imokilly	Cork Athletic Grounds, Cork
	C McCarthy 1-5, B Scully 2-0, B Kenneally 1-0, M Archer 1-0, T Kirby 0-1, T Maher 0-1, P Freaney 0-1, C Cullinane 0-1.		S Barry 0-13, D Daly 1-0, N Gallagher 0-2, M Hegarty 0-1, P Fitzgerald 0-1, P Ring 0-1, D Clifford 0-1.	Attendance: 13,433; Referee: G Fitzgerald (Limerick)

== Championship statistics ==
=== Top scorers ===
Top scorer overall

Rank	Player	Club	Tally	Total	Matches	Average
1	Charlie McCarthy	St. Finbarr's	5-21	36	4	9.00
2	John Kevin Coleman	Carrigdhoun	5-08	22	2	11.00
3	Justin McCarthy	Passage	3-11	20	2	10.00
3	Tomás Ryan	Muskerry	3-11	20	2	10.00
5	Seánie Barry	Imokilly	0-19	19	2	9.50
6	Denis McCarthy	Blackrock	4-02	14	2	7.00
6	Mick Archer	St. Finbarr's	4-02	14	3	4.66
8	Paddy Ring	Imokilly	3-04	13	3	4.33
8	Noel Gallagher	Imokilly	2-07	13	3	4.33
10	Matt Hegarty	Imokilly	2-06	12	3	4.00
10	Charlie Cullinane	St. Finbarr's	2-06	12	4	3.00

Top scorers in a single game

Rank	Player	Club	Tally	Total	Opposition
1	John Kevin Coleman	Carrigdhoun	2-07	13	Muskerry
1	Seánie Barry	Imokilly	0-13	13	St. Finbarr's
3	Justin McCarthy	Passage	3-03	12	St. Finbarr's
3	Tomás Ryan	Muskerry	1-09	12	Carrigdhoun
3	Charlie McCarthy	St. Finbarr's	1-09	12	Carrigdhoun
6	John Barry	Passage	3-02	11	Sarsfields
6	Charlie McCarthy	St. Finbarr's	2-05	11	Passage
8	John Kevin Coleman	Carrigdhoun	3-01	10	St. Finbarr's
9	John Bennett	Blackrock	3-00	9	Duhallow
9	Pierce Freaney	St. Finbarr's	2-03	9	Na Piarsaigh
9	Paddy Ring	Imokilly	2-03	9	Carbery
9	Noel Gallagher	Imokilly	2-03	9	Carbery

=== Miscellaneous ===
- On 15 August 1968, Glen Rovers withdrew from the championship in protest over the expulsion of Glen player Andrew O'Flynn from the Gaelic Athletic Association and the suspension of three other Glen players as a result of an investigation into incidents in the Glen Rovers-University College Cork quarter-final.
- Gerald McCarthy from the St. Finbarr's club got married on the day before the county final and delayed his honeymoon until immediately after the game.
- Imokilly qualify for the final for the first time since 1949
