= Joe Murphy (hurler) =

Irish hurler (1947–2009)

Personal information
- Native name: Seosamh Ó Murchú (Irish)
- Nickname: Josna
- Born: 1947 Passage West, County Cork, Ireland
- Died: 6 April 2009 (aged 71) Monkstown, County Cork Ireland

Sport
- Sport: Hurling
- Position: Midfield
Clubs
- Years: Club
- Passage; Shamrocks
Club titles
- Cork titles: 0
Inter-county
Years	County	Apps (scores)
1968-1970	Cork	4 (0-03)
Inter-county titles
- Munster titles: 2
- All-Irelands: 1
- NHL: 2

Joseph M. Murphy (1947 – 6 April 2009) was an Irish hurler who played at club level with Passage and Shamrocks and at inter-county level with the Cork senior hurling team. He usually lined out at centre-back.

== Career ==
Murphy first played hurling at juvenile and underage levels with the Passage club and later became a mainstay of the club's senior team. At inter-county level, he never played at minor level with Cork but was a substitute on the under-21 team that beat Wexford in the 1968 All-Ireland under-21 final. Murphy was subsequently drafted onto the Cork senior hurling team during the team's successful 1968-69 National League campaign. It was the first of two successive league titles as well as consecutive Munster Championship titles. After coming on as a substitute in the 1969 All-Ireland final defeat by Kilkenny, Murphy ended the following season with All-Ireland success after a 6-21 to 5-10 win over Wexford in the 1970 All-Ireland final. He later joined the Shamrocks club and won divisional titles in both hurling and Gaelic football.

== Death ==
Murphy died after a long period of illness on 6 April 2009, aged 71.

== Honours ==
Shamrocks

- South East Junior A Football Championship: 1980
- South East Junior A Hurling Championship: 1980, 1981

Cork

- All-Ireland Senior Hurling Championship: 1970
- Munster Senior Hurling Championship: 1969, 1970
- National Hurling League: 1968-69, 1969-70
- All-Ireland Under-21 Hurling Championship: 1968
- Munster Under-21 Hurling Championship: 1968
