= Pat McDonnell =

Irish hurler (born 1950)

Personal information
- Native name: Pádraig Mac Domhnaill (Irish)
- Born: 18 March 1950 (age 76) Aghabullogue, County Cork, Ireland
- Occupation: Retired secondary school principal
- Height: 6 ft 0 in (183 cm)

Sport
- Sport: Hurling
- Position: Full-back
Clubs
- Years: Club
- Inniscarra; University College Cork; Muskerry
Club titles
- Cork titles: 1
College
- Years: College
- 1968–1972: University College Cork
College titles
- Fitzgibbon titles: 2
Inter-county*
Years	County	Apps (scores)
1970–1978	Cork	20 (0–1)
Inter-county titles
- Munster titles: 5
- All-Irelands: 2
- NHL: 2
- All Stars: 0
- *Inter County team apps and scores correct as of 17:01, 8 April 2015.

Pat McDonnell (born 18 March 1950) is an Irish retired hurler who played as a full-back for the Cork senior team.

Born in Aghabullogue, County Cork, attended secondary school at Presentation Brothers College, Cork. He arrived on the inter-county scene at the age of eighteen when he first linked up with the Cork minor team before later joining the under-21 and intermediate sides. He made his senior debut during the 1969–70. McDonnell immediately became a regular member of the starting fifteen and won two All-Ireland medals, five Munster medals and two National Hurling League medals. He was an All-Ireland runner-up on one occasion.

As a member of the Munster inter-provincial team on a number of occasions, McDonnell won one Railway Cup medal as a non-playing substitute. At club level he is a one-time championship medallist with University College Cork. In addition to this he lined out Inniscarra and Muskerry.

Throughout his career McDonnell made 20 championship appearances. His retirement came following the conclusion of the 1978 championship.

In retirement from playing McDonnell became involved in team management and coaching. He had All-Ireland successes as a selector with the Cork under-21 and senior teams while he also served as a selector and coach with various Inniscarra teams.

== Playing career ==
=== College ===
During his schooling at Presentation Brothers College McDonnell played with various rugby union teams. He won back-to-back Munster Junior Cup medals in 1965 and 1966 following respective defeats of Rockwell College and St. Munchin's College.

McDonnell also played for the Munster Schoolboys Senior Team in the 1968 Interprovincial series.

=== University ===
During his studies at University College Cork McDonnell came played competitively as a hurler and as a rugby player.

On the rugby field, McDonnell won a Nunan Cup medal in 1969–70. He also played on a number of other teams in UCC including the junior and senior teams.

McDonnell was as a member of the university's senior hurling team, and played at full-back on the UCC team that faced rivals University College Dublin in the Fitzgibbon Cup decider in 1969. A narrow 1–12 to 1–10 defeat was the result on that occasion.

Two years later McDonnell was captain of the UCC team that faced University College Galway in that year's decider. A 2–16 to 2–6 victory gave McDonnell a Fitzgibbon Cup medal.

McDonnell was at full-back on the team for the last time in 1972 as University College Cork reached a third decider in four seasons. A 3–11 to 0–6 beating of University College Galway gave McDonnell his second successive Fitzgibbon Cup medal.

=== Club ===
McDonnell began his club hurling career at under-14 level with Aghabullogue in 1962. He later moved to Inniscarra where he joined their under-14 team in 1964.

As a student McDonnell had success on the club scene as a member of the University College Cork team in 1970. After losing seven finals in the previous thirteen years (including a replay), the collegians finally won a championship medal through a 2–12 to 0–16 defeat of Muskerry which, ironically, was McDonnell's home division. It was his first championship medal.

In 1975 Inniscarra reached the junior championship decider after winning the divisional crown. McDonnell was at full-back as Ballymartle provided the opposition. After leading by 2–2 to 1–2 at half-time, Inniscarra went on to score a further three goals after the interval. A 5–7 to 3–8 victory gave McDonnell a championship medal in the junior grade.

=== Minor, under-21 and intermediate ===
McDonnell first came to prominence on the inter-county scene as a member of the Cork minor hurling and football teams in 1968. He made his hurling debut in the provincial decider on 21 July 1968 and collected a Munster medal following a 7–8 to 5–4 defeat of Waterford. McDonnell was an unused substitute for Cork's subsequent All-Ireland final defeat by Wexford. Also that year he claimed a Munster medal with Cork's footballers following a 4–15 to 4–10 defeat of Clare. He was dropped from the starting fifteen for Cork's subsequent 3–5 to 1–10 All-Ireland final defeat of Sligo.

In 1969 McDonnell made his under-21 debut in an 8–14 to 1–1 Munster semi-final defeat of Galway. He missed the subsequent provincial final victory but was introduced as a substitute in the All-Ireland final against Wexford on 14 September 1969. A 5–13 to 4–7 victory gave McDonnell his first All-Ireland medal.

That same year McDonnell was drafted onto the Cork intermediate team. He won a Munster medal following a 4–14 to 0–6 win over Galway before later lining out against Kildare in the All-Ireland decider on 12 October 1969. A 2–8 to 3–4 defeat was the result on that occasion.

McDonnell won his first Munster medal with the under-21s in 1970 following a 3–11 to 2–7 defeat of Tipperary. Cork faced Wexford in the subsequent All-Ireland decider on 11 October 1970, however, that game ended in a 3–8 to 2–11 draw. The replay three weeks later was more conclusive, with Cork winning with a 5–17 to 0–8 victory. It was McDonnell's second All-Ireland medal.

In 1971 McDonnell was named captain of the under-21 team. He won a second Munster medal that year following a 5–11 to 4–9 defeat of Tipperary. On 12 September 1971 Wexford stood in the way of Cork securing a record-breaking fourth successive championship and a high-scoring game ensued. A 7–8 to 1–11 victory gave McDonnell his third successive All-Ireland medal, while he also had the honour of lifting the cup.

=== Senior ===
==== Early successes ====
McDonnell made his senior debut for Cork during their 1969–70 National League campaign. It was a successful campaign for the Rebels as an aggregate 5–21 to 6–16 defeat of New York gave McDonnell his first National Hurling League medal. The subsequent championship campaign saw McDonnell win his first Munster medal as Tipperary were beaten 3–10 to 3–8. Cork subsequently faced Wexford in the All-Ireland decider on 6 September 1970. A record 64-point scoreline and eleven goals were produced in the contest. The day belonged to Eddie O'Brien who scored a hat-trick of goals for Cork from his hand as Cork secured a 6–21 to 5–10 victory. It was McDonnell's first All-Ireland medal. He finished the year by becoming the youngest recipient of the Texaco Hurler of the Year award.

After a less successful season under McDonnell's captaincy in 1971, McDonnell had more success in 1972 when he won a third league medal following a 3–14 to 2–14 defeat of Limerick. He later added a second Munster medal to his collection following a 6–18 to 2–8 win over Clare. Rivals Kilkenny provided the opposition in the subsequent All-Ireland final on 3 September 1972. Halfway through the second-half Cork were on form and stretched their lead to eight points. Kilkenny's Eddie Keher was deployed closer to goal and finished the game with 2–9. A fifteen-point swing resulted in Kilkenny winning the game by 3–24 to 5–11.

McDonnell was dropped from the Cork panel in 1973, however, he returned in 1975 and collected a third Munster medal following a 3–14 to 0–12 defeat of reigning provincial champions Limerick.

==== Three-in-a-row ====
"The Rebels" retained the provincial title in 1976 following a 3–15 to 4–5 defeat of Limerick once again. It was McDonnell's fourth winners' medal. Wexford provided the opposition in the subsequent All-Ireland final on 5 September 1976. Wexford got off to a great start and were 2–2 to no score ahead after just six minutes. Wexford had a two-point lead with ten minutes to go, however, three points from Jimmy Barry-Murphy, two from Pat Moylan and a kicked effort from Ray Cummins gave Cork a 2–21 to 4–11 victory. It was McDonnell's second All-Ireland medal.

Cork faced Clare in the provincial decider in 1977, on a day when armed robbers made away with the takings from the gate of £24,579 during the second half of the game. Clare conceded an early penalty but they fought back to take the lead until a red card for full back Jim Power turned the tide for Cork and they eventually won by 4–15 to 4–10, with McDonnell collecting a fifth winners' medal. He was dropped from the starting fifteen for Cork's subsequent All-Ireland campaign, however, he did collect a third All-Ireland medal as a non-playing substitute following Cork's 1–17 to 3–8 defeat of Wexford.

McDonnell lost his place on Cork's championship fifteen in 1978. In spite of this he collected another Munster medal as a non-playing substitute following Cork's 0–13 to 0–11 provincial final defeat of Clare. McDonnell was listed amongst the substitute for Cork's subsequent All-Ireland game against Kilkenny on 3 September 1978. A 1–15 to 2–8 victory secured a third championship title in succession and a fourth All-Ireland winners' medal for McDonnell, his second as a substitute.

Injuries had led to McDonnell playing a reduced role in the previous few years and he retired from inter-county hurling following Cork's three-in-a-row success.

=== Inter-provincial ===
McDonnell also was selected for Munster in the inter-provincial series of games. He won his sole Railway Cup medal as an unused substitute in 1976, when Munster defeated Leinster by 4–9 to 4–8.

== Post-playing career ==
=== Cork ===
McDonnell first became involved as a selector at inter-county level with the Cork senior hurlers in 1986. A 2–18 to 3–12 defeat of Clare secured a record-equaling fifth successive Munster title that year. This victory paved the way for an All-Ireland final meeting with Galway. Galway were favourites against a Cork team seen as being in decline, however, on the day 4 Cork goals, one from John Fenton, two from Tomás Mulcahy and one from Kevin Hennessy, helped Cork to a 4–13 to 2–15 victory.

In 1990 McDonnell was a selector with the Cork minor hurling team that secured the Munster title following a 1–9 to 0–9 defeat of Clare. The Rebels later faced Kilkenny in the All-Ireland decider, however, both sides finished level at 3–14 apiece. Kilkenny proved too strong in the replay and Cork fell to a 3–16 to 0–11 defeat.

McDonnell joined the Cork under-21 management team in 1997. His side secured the Munster title that year following a one-point defeat of Tipperary. Cork later defeated Galway in the All-Ireland final with a 3–11 to 0–13 victory. It was Cork's 100th All-Ireland championship in the history of the Gaelic Athletic Association.

1998 saw Cork maintaining their provincial under-21 dominance with the side collecting a second Munster title following a 3–18 to 1–10 victory over Tipperary. For the second year in-a-row Cork later faced Galway in the All-Ireland decider. In a close game Cork just about secured a 2–15 to 2–10 victory.

McDonnell was also a selector with the Cork senior team during a controversial period in 2002 when the players went on strike for better conditions.

== Personal life ==
McDonnell was born in Aghabullogue, County Cork in 1950. The third eldest in a family of three boys and three girls he was educated at Tullig National School before later attending Presentation Brothers College in Cork.

After studying science at University College Cork McDonnell qualified with a BSc Hons in 1972. He then took up teaching as a profession and was appointed to St. Patricks Girl's Secondary School in 1972 where he taught Science and Biology until 1975. McDonnell then transferred to Coláiste Iognáid Rís where he taught until 1980. In 1980 he transferred to Bishopstown Community School and was appointed principal there in 1997. He retired as Principal in 2009. In addition to his teaching duties McDonnell also participated in the training and coaching of various school teams.

== Honours ==
=== Team ===
Presentation Brothers College

- Munster Schools Junior Cup (2): 1965, 1966

Inniscarra

- Cork Junior Hurling Championship (1): 1975

University College Cork

- Cork Senior Hurling Championship (1): 1970
- Fitzgibbon Cup (1): 1971, 1972

Cork

- All-Ireland Senior Hurling Championship (4): 1970, 1976, 1977 (sub), 1978 (sub)
- Munster Senior Hurling Championship (6): 1970, 1972, 1975, 1976, 1977, 1978 (sub)
- National Hurling League (2): 1969–70, 1971–72
- Munster Intermediate Hurling Championship (1): 1969
- All-Ireland Under-21 Hurling Championship (3): 1969 (sub), 1970, 1971 (c)
- Munster Under-21 Hurling Championship (3): 1969, 1970, 1971 (c)
- Munster Minor Hurling Championship (1): 1968

Munster

- Railway Cup (1): 1976 (sub)

=== Individual ===
Honours

- Texaco Hurler of the Year (1): 1970

Awards
Preceded by Ted Carroll (Kilkenny)	Texaco Hurler of the Year; 1970	Succeeded by Babs Keating (Tipperary)
Sporting positions
Preceded by Paddy Barry	Cork Senior Hurling Captain; 1971	Succeeded by Frank Norberg
Achievements
Preceded by Teddy O'Brien (Cork)	All-Ireland Under-21 Hurling Final winning captain 1971	Succeeded by Iggy Clarke (Galway)
Preceded by Séamus Hogan (University College Galway)	Fitzgibbon Cup Final winning captain 1971	Succeeded by Mick McCarthy (University College Cork)
