= Michael Collins (hurler) =

Irish hurler

Personal information
- Native name: Mícheál Ó Coileáin (Irish)
- Born: 1940 Enniscorthy, County Wexford, Ireland
- Died: 13 June 2009 (aged 68) Enniscorthy, County Wexford, Ireland
- Height: 5 ft 11 in (180 cm)

Sport
- Sport: Hurling
- Position: Full-back
Club
- Years: Club
- Enniscorthy Shamrocks
Club titles
- Wexford titles: 2
Inter-county
Years	County	Apps (scores)
1966-1970	Wexford	7 (0-00)
Inter-county titles
- Leinster titles: 1
- All-Irelands: 0
- NHL: 1

Michael "Mick" Collins (1940 – 13 June 2009) was an Irish hurler who played as a full-back with the Wexford senior team.

Born in Enniscorthy, County Wexford, Collins was introduced to hurling in his youth. He enjoyed championship successes with the Enniscorthy Shamrocks club, winning two championship medals at senior level.

Collins made his senior debut with Wexford during the 1966 championship. He went on to play a key role for Wexford in defence and won one Leinster medal and one National Hurling League medal. Collins was an All-Ireland runner-up as captain on one occasion.

Throughout his inter-county career Collins made 7 championship appearances. He retired from inter-county hurling following the conclusion of the 1970 championship.

In retirement from playing Collins served as chairman of the Enniscorthy Rapparees hurling club.

== Playing career ==
=== Club ===
In 1964 Collins was full-back on the Enniscorthy Shamrocks team that reached their very first championship decider. A defeat of Faythe Harriers gave him his first championship medal.

After defeat in the 1966 decider, Shamrocks were back in 1969. A defeat of Ferns St. Aidan's gave Collins a second championship medal.

=== Inter-county ===
Collins first played senior hurling for Wexford in 1966. He claimed his first silverware with a National Hurling League medal in 1967 following a 3–10 to 1–9 defeat of Kilkenny.

In 1970 Collins was appointed captain of the team. A 4–16 to 3–14 defeat of old rivals Kilkenny in the very first 80-minute championship game gave him a Leinster medal. Wexford subsequently faced Cork in the All-Ireland decider on 6 September 1970. A record 64-point scoreline and eleven goals were produced in a sometimes ill-tempered and disappointing contest. Tony Doran top scored for Wexford with two goals, however, the day belonged to Eddie O'Brien who scored a hat-trick of goals for Cork from his hand. A remarkable 6–21 to 5–10 score line gave Cork the victory.

== Honours ==
Enniscorthy Shamrocks

- Wexford Senior Hurling Championship (2): 1964, 1969

Wexford

- Leinster Senior Hurling Championship (1): 1970 (c)
- National Hurling League (1): 1966-67

Sporting positions
Preceded by Tony Doran	Wexford Senior Hurling Captain; 1970	Succeeded by
Achievements
Preceded by Denis Murphy (Cork)	All-Ireland Senior Hurling Final runner-up captain 1970	Succeeded by Pat Henderson (Kilkenny)
