= Willie John Ring =

Irish hurler (1917–2008)

Personal information
- Born: 1917 Cloyne, County Cork, Ireland
- Died: 11 October 2008 (aged 91) Cloyne, County Cork, Ireland

Sport
- Sport: Hurling
- Position: Right corner-back
Clubs
- Years: Club
- Cloyne → Imokilly
Club titles
- Cork titles: 0
Inter-county
Years	County	Apps (scores)
1940	Cork	0 (0-00)
Inter-county titles
- Munster titles: 0
- All-Irelands: 0
- NHL: 0

William John Ring (1917 – 11 October 2008) was an Irish hurler, trainer and administrator. At club level he played with Cloyne, divisional side Imokilly and at inter-county level with various Cork teams.

== Playing career ==
Ring played minor and junior hurling with the Cloyne club, winning back-to-back East Cork JHC medals in 1938 and 1939 and Cork JHC medal in the latter year. In the same period, he lined out with divisional side Imokilly. Ring was a member of the Cork junior hurling team in the 1930s and played with the senior team in the Oireachtas Cup in 1940. A serious knee injury curtailed his playing career.

== Post-playing career ==
Ring was a long-time trainer and selector of Cloyne teams which won multiple East Cork JHC titles across three decades, as well as a Cork JHC title in 1961 and Cork IHC titles in 1966 and 1970. He also served as a trainer and selector with the Imokilly team. Ring was also Cloyne chairman on two separate occasions and was club president for 30 years.

== Personal life and death ==
Ring was born in Cloyne, County Cork 1917. His brother, Christy Ring, won eight All-Ireland SHC medals and is regarded by many as one of the greatest players of all time. His son, Paddy Ring, also played at various levels with Cork.

Ring died on 11 October 2008, at the age of 91.

== Honours ==
=== Player ===
Cloyne

- Cork Junior Hurling Championship: 1939
- East Cork Junior Hurling Championship: 1938, 1939

=== Management ===
Cloyne

- Cork Intermediate Hurling Championship: 1966, 1970
- Cork Junior Hurling Championship: 1961
- East Cork Junior Hurling Championship: 1958, 1960, 1961, 1976
