= Charlie Cullinane =

Irish hurler

Personal information
- Native name: Cathal Ó Cuileannáin (Irish)
- Born: 10 November 1943 Connolly Road, Cork, Ireland
- Died: 21 July 2015 (aged 71) Wilton, Cork, Ireland
- Occupation: Diageo employee
- Height: 5 ft 11 in (180 cm)

Sport
- Sport: Hurling
- Position: Centre-forward
Club
- Years: Club
- St Finbarr’s
Club titles
- Cork titles: 3
- Munster titles: 2
- All-Ireland Titles: 1
Inter-county
Years	County	Apps (scores)
1968–1970	Cork	8 (3–9)
Inter-county titles
- Munster titles: 2
- All-Irelands: 1
- NHL: 1

Charles Cullinane (10 November 1943 – 21 July 2015) was an Irish hurler who played as a centre-forward at senior level for the Cork county team.

Cullinane joined the team during the 1968–69 National League and was a regular member of the starting fifteen until his retirement after the 1970 championship. During that time he won one All-Ireland medal, two Munster medals and one National League medal. Cullinane was an All-Ireland runner-up on one occasion.

At club level Cullinane was a one-time All-Ireland medalist with St Finbarr's. In addition to this he has also won two Munster medals and three county club championship medals.

== Playing career ==
=== Club ===
Cullinane played his club hurling with St Finbarr's and had much success during a golden age for the club.

After losing the championship decider to Glen Rovers in 1964, "the Barr's" were back for a second successive final the following year. University College Cork provided the opposition, however, a youthful St. Finbarr's team powered to a 6–8 to 2–6 victory. It was Cullinane's first championship medal. A subsequent 3–12 to 2–3 trouncing of Waterford's Mount Sion gave him a Munster medal.

After surrendering their titles the following year and losing the final to Glen Rovers in 1967, St Finbarr's recovered in 1968. Cullinane collected a second championship medal following a narrow 5–9 to 1–19 defeat of Imokilly.

After an absence of six years St Finbarr's returned to the top table of Cork hurling once again. In spite of being regarded as underdogs against Blackrock, Con Roche gave a masterful display in helping the Barr's to a 2–17 to 2–14 victory. It was Cullinane's third championship medal. Newmarket-on-Fergus were the opponents in the subsequent provincial decider A low-scoring 0–7 to 0–3 victory gave Cullinane his second Munster medal, however, the game was tinged with sadness for St. Finbarr's as an horrific shine-bone injury brought Bernie Scully's career to an end. The All-Ireland final on St Patrick's weekend saw St Finbarr's take on the Fenians of Kilkenny. St Finbarr's ability to get goals at crucial times proved to be the difference in the 3–8 to 1–6 victory. It was Cullinane’s sole All-Ireland medal.

=== Inter-county ===
Cullinane made his senior debut for Cork during their successful 1968–69 National Hurling League campaign. A 3–12 to 1–14 defeat of Wexford in the decider gave Cullinane his first National Hurling League medal. The subsequent provincial decider pitted Cork against reigning champions Tipperary. A 4–6 to 0–9 victory gave Cork a first defeat of Tipp since 1957 while it also gave Cullinane a first Munster medal. Once again this victory paved the way for an All-Ireland showdown with Kilkenny, however, the team suffered a setback before the game when midfielder Justin McCarthy broke his leg in a motorcycle accident. In spite of this Cork led at the interval and looked a good bet for the victory, particularly after Kilkenny forward Pat Delaney left the field on a stretcher. The Rebels were still to the good coming into the last quarter, however, Kilkenny scored five unanswered points in the last seven minutes to win by 2–15 to 2–9.

In spite of the All-Ireland defeat, Cork regrouped the following year. The championship campaign saw Cullinane win his second Munster medal as Tipperary were accounted for by 3–10 to 3–8. Cork later qualified for the All-Ireland final with Wexford providing the opposition in the very first eighty-minute championship decider. The game saw a record 64-point score line for both teams as Cork's Eddie O'Brien scored a hat-trick of goals to give Cork a considerable lead. At the full-time whistle Cork were the winners by 6–21 to 5–10, giving Cullinane an All-Ireland medal.

=== Inter-provincial ===
Cullinane also had the honour of being selected for Munster in the inter-provincial series of games. He won his sole Railway Cup medal as an unused sub in 1970 when Munster defeated Connacht.

== Honours ==
St Finbarr's

- All-Ireland Senior Club Hurling Championship (1): 1975
- Munster Senior Club Hurling Championship (2): 1965, 1974
- Cork Senior Club Hurling Championship (3): 1965, 1968, 1974

Cork

- All-Ireland Senior Hurling Championship (1): 1970
- Munster Senior Hurling Championship (2): 1969, 1970
- National Hurling League (1): 1968–69

Munster

- Railway Cup (1): 1970 (sub)
