= Eddie O'Brien (hurler) =

Cork hurler

Personal information
- Native name: Éamonn Ó Briain (Irish)
- Nickname: Eddie O
- Born: 12 January 1945 (age 81) Passage, County Cork
- Occupation: Corporate security
- Height: 5 ft 9 in (175 cm)

Sport
- Sport: Hurling
- Position: Left wing-forward
Clubs
Years	Club	Apps (scores)
1963–1970 1971	Passage; Ballygunner	14 (6–15); 3 (2–4)
Inter-county
Years	County	Apps (scores)
1965–1970	Cork	12 (7–10)
Inter-county titles
- Munster titles: 2
- All-Irelands: 1
- NHL: 2

Eddie O'Brien (born 12 January 1945 in Passage West, County Cork) is an Irish former sportsman. He played hurling with his local club Passage and with the Cork senior county team in the 1960s and 1970s.

== Playing career ==
=== Club ===
O'Brien played his club hurling with his local club in Passage. He enjoyed some success at juvenile levels before moving onto the club’s top team. Passage played in the county intermediate championship and last won the title in 1960, prior to O'Brien's playing days. He played with the club's top team throughout the 1960s and 1970s, however, he enjoyed little success apart from a city division senior football title in 1969. O'Brien was regarded as a better Gaelic footballer than a hurler and is considered to be Passage's greatest ever footballer.

=== Inter-county ===
O'Brien first came to prominence on the inter-county scene as a member of the Cork minor hurling team in the early 1960s. He lined out for Cork in this grade in 1963, however, his side was defeated in the early rounds of the championship. In 1964 O'Brien was a key member of both the Cork under-21 hurling team. Success was slow in coming but the big breakthrough for Cork and O'Brien came in 1966. That year he won a Munster title with the under-21 team following a 5-12 to 2-6 defeat of Limerick . The subsequent All-Ireland final saw Cork play Wexford in an interesting encounter. After an entertaining sixty minutes of hurling both sides finished level with Cork scoring 3-12 to Wexford’s 5-6. The replay took place shortly afterwards, however, both sides finished all square again with 4-9 apiece. A second replay had to be played to eventually find a winner. At the third time of asking Cork emerged victorious with a huge tally of 9-9 to 5-9. This victory gave Cork their first All-Ireland title in this grade and gave O'Brien an All-Ireland under-21 medal.

By this stage O'Brien was already a member of the Cork senior hurling team. He made his debut in 1965, however, Cork were thrashed by Tipperary in the Munster final. In spite of this O'Brien was not a member of the panel in 1966 when Cork captured both the Munster and All-Ireland titles.

By 1969, however, O'Brien was back on the senior team. That year he tasted success early in the year Cork defeated Wexford by 3-12 to 1-14 to take the National Hurling League title. This victory gave Cork a huge boost going into the Munster campaign where the team qualified to meet Tipperary in the final. Cork were out to avenge the nine-point defeat administered by the same side in 1968 while Tipp were out to capture a third provincial title in-a-row. The game was a major triumph for Cork as ‘the Rebels’ won by 4-6 to 0-9. It was a victory that made up for all the beatings that Tipp had dished out to Cork in the early part of the decade and it gave O'Brien a first Munster winners’ medal. This victory paved the way for an All-Ireland showdown with Kilkenny. The game was there for the taking for Cork, particularly after Kilkenny forward Pat Delaney left the field on a stretcher. ‘The Rebels’ led ‘the Cats’ coming into the last quarter, however, Kilkenny scored five unanswered points in the last seven minutes to win by 2-15 to 2-9.

In 1970 Cork were still regarded as one of the best teams in the country and expectations were high. At the start of the year Cork defeated New York with an aggregate score of 5-21 to 6-16 to take the National League title. It was O'Brien's second winners’ medal in the competition. For the third year in-a-row Cork qualified for the Munster final where Tipperary provided the opposition. It was the first eighty-minute final in the history of the provincial championship and a close affair developed. At the final whistle Cork were the victors by 3-10 to 3-8 and O'Brien captured his second Munster title. Cork later qualified for the All-Ireland final where Wexford were the opponents. On the night before the final O'Brien has admitted to sneaking away from the hotel where his team mates were staying and went to a pub in Dún Laoghaire where he drank nine pints of Guinness. This didn't affect his impact on the game the following day in a game that broke all records with a huge 64-point score line. O'Brien scored a hat-trick of goals to help his team to a 6-21 to 5-10 victory. It was his only All-Ireland medal.

O'Brien was the last man to score a hat-trick in an All-Ireland SHC final until Lar Corbett in 2010.

== Career statistics ==
=== Club ===
Team	Year	SHC	
Team	Year	Apps	Score
Passage	1963	2	0–1
Passage	1964	2	1–1
Passage	1965	2	1–5
Passage	1966	2	1–2
Passage	1967	1	1–0
Passage	1968	2	1–1
Passage	1969	1	0–2
Passage	1970	2	1–3
Ballygunner	1971	3	2–4

=== Inter-county ===
Team	Year	National League			Munster		All-Ireland		Total	
Team	Year	Division	Apps	Score	Apps	Score	Apps	Score	Apps	Score
Cork	1964–65	Division 1A	0	0–0	3	1–5	—		3	1–5
Cork	1965–66	Division 1B	—		—		—		—	
Cork	1966–67	Division 1B	—		—		—		—	
Cork	1967–68	Division 1B	2	1–1	0	0–0	—		2	1–1
Cork	1968–69	Division 1B	5	2–3	4	0–3	1	0–1	10	2–7
Cork	1969–70	Division 1B	7	2–4	2	2–0	2	4–1	11	8–5
Career total			14	5–8	9	3–8	3	4–2	26	12–18

== Honours ==
Passage

- City Junior A Football Championship: 1969

Cork

- All-Ireland Senior Hurling Championship: 1970
- Munster Senior Hurling Championship: 1969, 1970
- National Hurling League: 1968-69, 1969-70
- All-Ireland Under-21 Hurling Championship: 1966
- Munster Under-21 Hurling Championship: 1966
