= Paschal Russell =

Irish hurler

Personal information
- Native name: Paschal Ruiséil (Irish)
- Born: 1948 (age 77–78) Clarecastle, County Clare, Ireland

Sport
- Sport: Hurling
- Position: Midfield
Club
- Years: Club
- Clarecastle
Club titles
- Clare titles: 4
Inter-county
Years	County	Apps (scores)
1969-1982	Clare	4 (0-5)
Inter-county titles
- Munster titles: 0
- All-Irelands: 0
- NHL: 0
- All Stars: 0

Paschal Russell (born 1948) is an Irish former hurler who played as a midfielder and as a forward for the Clare senior team.

Russell made his debut for the team during the 1969 championship and was a semi-regular member of the starting fifteen until his retirement after the 1982 championship. Clare hurling was at a low ebb for much of Russell's career, and he ended his career without any honours at senior level.

At club level Russell is a four-time county club championship medalist with Clarecastle.
