= 1905 Cork Junior Hurling Championship =

Irish hurling competition

- Champions: Passage (1st title)
- Runners-up: Redmonds

The 1905 Cork Junior Hurling Championship was the 11th staging of the Cork Junior Hurling Championship since its establishment by the Cork County Board in 1895.

Passage won the championship title for the first time in their history.
