= 1961 Croke Cup =

Irish hurling competition

- Dates: 26 March - 23 April 1961
- Teams: 3
- Champions: St Kieran's College (4th title); Pierce Freaney (captain)
- Runners-up: North Monastery

Tournament statistics
- Matches played: 2
- Goals scored: 11 (5.5 per match)
- Points scored: 21 (10.5 per match)
- Top scorer(s): Tom Forristal (3-01)

The 1961 Croke Cup was the 10th staging of the Croke Cup since its establishment by the Gaelic Athletic Association in 1944. The competition ran from 26 March to 23 April 1961.

The North Monastery were the defending champions.

The final was played on 23 April 1961 at Thurles Sportsfield, between the St Kieran's College and the North Monastery, in what was their first ever meeting in the final. St Kieran's College won the match by 8–08 to 1–04 to claim their fourth Croke Cup title overall and their first title in two years.

Tom Forrisyal was the top scorer with 3-01.

== Qualification ==
Province	Champions
Connacht	St Molaise's College
Leinster	St Kieran's College
Munster	North Monastery

== Results ==
=== Semi-final ===
26 March 1961 Semi-final	North Monastery	1-08 - 1-01	St Molaise's College	Thurles Sportsfield
	P Curley 1-1, C Mulcahy 0-3, N Crowley 0-2, B Fitton 0-1, S O'Mahony 0-1.		P Mannion 1-0, M Derrivan 0-1.

=== Final ===
23 April 1961 Final	St Kieran's College	8-08 - 1-04	North Monastery	Thurles Sportsfield
	T Forristal 3-1, M Aylward 2-1, P Freaney 1-4, R Moore 2-0, M Walsh 0-1, J Delaney 0-1.		R O'Connell 1-0, C Mulcahy 0-3, B Fitton 0-1.

== Statistics ==
=== Top scorers ===
Overall

Rank	Player	County	Tally	Total	Matches	Average
1	Tom Forristal	St Kieran's College	3-01	10	1	10.00
2	Maurice Aylward	St Kieran's College	2-01	7	1	7.00
2	Pierce Freaney	St Kieran's College	1-04	7	1	10.00
