= Pierce Freaney =

Irish hurler

Personal information
- Born: 1943 (age 82–83) Inistioge, County Kilkenny, Ireland
- Occupation: Garda Síochána

Sport
- Sport: Hurling
- Position: Left wing-forward
Clubs
- Years: Club
- Rower-Inistioge; Carlow Town; St Finbarr's; Sarsfields
Club titles
- Cork titles: 1
Inter-county
| Years | County | Apps (scores) |
| 1962; 1966–1968 1963–1964 | Kilkenny; Carlow | 1 (1-03); 3 (0-01) |
Inter-county titles
- Munster titles: 0
- All-Irelands: 0
- NHL: 0

Pierce J. Freaney (born 1943) was an Irish hurler. At club level he played with Rower-Inistioge, Carlow Town and St Finbarr's and at inter-county level with Kilkenny and Carlow.

== Playing career ==
Freaney first played hurling as a student at St Kieran's College in Kilkenny. He won a Croke Cup title in 1959, before captaining the team to All-Ireland final defeat by the North Monastery two years later. Freaney's performances for the college resulted in a call-up to the Kilkenny minor hurling team. His two years in the grade yielded consecutive All-Ireland MHC medals in 1960 and 1961.

Freaney immediately progressed to Kilkenny's intermediate team in 1962, while he also lined out for the senior team in some tournament games. He transferred to the Carlow Town club in 1963 and won a Carlow SHC medal in his first season. Freaney also played for the Carlow senior hurling team in the Leinster SHC.

A spell with the Rower-Inistioge club was followed by a transfer to the St Finbarr's club in Cork in 1967. Freaney's first season with the club saw him end the championship as top scorer, before winning a Cork SHC in 1968. He earned a recall to the Kilkenny senior team for the 1968 Leinster SHC.

== Post-playing career ==
Freaney ended his career with the Sarsfields club in Newbridge, where he became involved in the administrative affairs of the club. He later served as the GAA's National Referees Recruitment Officer.

== Honours ==
St Kieran's College

- All-Ireland Colleges Senior Hurling Championship: 1959
- Leinster Colleges Senior Hurling Championship: 1959, 1961 (c)

Carlow Town

- Carlow Senior Hurling Championship: 1963

St Finbarr's

- Cork Senior Hurling Championship: 1968

Kilkenny

- All-Ireland Minor Hurling Championship: 1960, 1961
- Leinster Minor Hurling Championship: 1960, 1961
