= Denis Murphy (Cork hurler) =

Irish hurler (1939–2025)

Personal information
- Native name: Donncha Ó Murchú (Irish)
- Born: 1939 Donoughmore, County Cork, Ireland
- Died: 6 September 2025 (aged 86) Cork, Ireland
- Height: 5 ft 11 in (180 cm)

Sport
- Sport: Hurling
- Position: Left corner-back
Clubs
- Years: Club
- Grenagh; S. Finbarr's
Club titles
- Cork titles: 2
- Munster titles: 1
College
- Years: College
- University College Cork
College titles
- Fitzgibbon titles: 1
Inter-county*
Years	County	Apps (scores)
1960–1969	Cork	26 (0–1)
Inter-county titles
- Munster titles: 2
- All-Irelands: 1
- NHL: 1
- *Inter County team apps and scores correct as of 21:01, 26 April 2015.

Denis Murphy (1939 – 6 September 2025) was an Irish hurler who played as a left corner-back at senior level for the Cork county team.

Born in Donoughmore, County Cork, Murphy first played competitive hurling during his schooling at St Colman's College. He arrived on the inter-county scene at the age of twenty when he first linked up with the Cork junior team. He made his senior debut during the 1960 championship. Murphy immediately became a regular member of the starting fifteen and won one All-Ireland medal, two Munster medals and one National Hurling League medals. He was an All-Ireland runner-up on one occasion.

As a member of the Munster inter-provincial team on a number of occasions, Murphy won two Railway Cup medals. At club level he is a one-time Munster medallist with St Finbarr's. In addition to this he has also won two championship medals, after beginning his career with Grenagh.

Throughout his career Murphy made 26 championship appearances. His retirement came following the conclusion of the 1969 championship.

In retirement from playing Murphy became involved in team management and coaching. He was a selector with the Cork senior team during their three-in-a-row of All-Ireland successes between 1976 and 1978.

Murphy is widely regarded as one of the greatest hurlers of all time. In 2000 he was named in the left corner-back position on the Munster Hurling Team of the Millennium.

Murphy died on 6 September 2025, at the age of 86.

== Playing career ==
=== University ===
During his studies at University College Cork, Murphy was an automatic inclusion on the college hurling team. In 1959 he was at left corner-back as UCC faced arch rivals University College Dublin in the final of the Fitzgibbon Cup. A 4–8 to 3–2 victory gave Murphy a Fitzgibbon Cup medal.

=== Club ===
Murphy began his club career with Grenagh. He helped the club to the divisional junior championship in 1958, following a narrow 3–3 to 1–8 defeat of Éire Óg.

By the mid-sixties Murphy had transferred to the St Finbarr's club in Cork city. After losing the championship decider to Glen Rovers in 1964, "the Barr's" were back for a second successive final the following year. University College Cork provided the opposition, however, a youthful St. Finbarr's team powered to a 6–8 to 2–6 victory. It was Murphy's first championship medal. A subsequent 3–12 to 2–3 trouncing of Waterford's Mount Sion gave him a Munster medal.

After surrendering their titles the following year and losing the final to Glen Rovers in 1967, St Finbarr's recovered in 1968. Murphy collected a second championship medal following a narrow 5–9 to 1–19 defeat of Imokilly.

=== Inter-county ===
Murphy first played for Cork as a member of the junior hurling team on 5 May 1959 in a 5–8 to 2–4 Munster quarter-final defeat of Clare. He later won a Munster medal following a 3–9 to 4–3 defeat of Kerry in the decider.

His performances at junior level saw Murphy being drafted onto the Cork senior team. He made his senior championship debut on 31 July 1960 when he came on as a substitute in Cork's 4–13 to 4–11 Munster final defeat by Tipperary.

After a decade in the wilderness Cork bounced back in 1966. A 4–9 to 2–9 defeat of Waterford in the provincial decider gave him his first Munster medal. The subsequent All-Ireland final on 4 September 1966 pitted Kilkenny against Cork for the first time in nineteen years. Kilkenny were the favourites, however, a hat-trick of goals from Colm Sheehan gave Cork a merited 3–9 to 1–10 victory over an Eddie Keher-inspired Kilkenny. Not only was it a first championship for Cork in twelve years, but it was Murphy's first All-Ireland medal. He finished off the year by winning his sole Cú Chulainn Award.

After surrendering their titles the following year, Cork had to wait until 1969 for further success. A 3–12 to 1–14 defeat of Wexford in the decider gave Murphy, who was now captain of the team, a National Hurling League medal. The subsequent provincial decider pitted Cork against reigning champions Tipperary. A 4–6 to 0–9 victory gave Cork a first defeat of Tipp since 1957 while it also gave Murphy a second Munster medal. Once again this victory paved the way for an All-Ireland showdown with Kilkenny on 7 September 1969, however, the team suffered a setback in the week leading up to the game when midfielder Justin McCarthy broke his leg in a motorcycle accident. The Leesiders got into their stride following an early goal by Charlie McCarthy and led by six points coming up to half time when Kilkenny score a goal themselves. In spite of this, Cork led at the interval and looked a good bet for the victory, particularly after Kilkenny forward Pat Delaney left the field on a stretcher. Cork were still in contention coming into the last quarter, however, Kilkenny scored five unanswered points in the last seven minutes to win by 2–15 to 2–9. In spite of this defeat, Murphy ended the year by being named Munster Hurler of the Year, however, he decided to retire from inter-county hurling at the relatively young age of thirty.

=== Inter-provincial ===
Murphy was first chosen on the Munster inter-provincial team in 1964. It was the first of four successive years on the team, however, it was also the first of two consecutive defeats by arch rivals Leinster in the decider.

In 1966, Murphy captured his first Railway Cup medal following a narrow 3–13 to 3–11 defeat of Leinster.

After being beaten in the decider again in 1967, Murphy failed to make the team in 1968. He was included at left corner-back the following year as Munster faced Connacht. A 2–9 apiece draw was followed by a 3–13 to 4–4 victory. It was Murphy's second Railway Cup medal.

== Cork selector ==
In 1976, Murphy was included on the Cork senior hurling management team as a selector. It was a successful year as Cork secured a second consecutive Munster crown following a 3–15 to 4–5 defeat of Limerick. On 5 September 1976, Cork faced Wexford in the All-Ireland decider. Wexford got off to a great start and were 2–2 to no score ahead after just six minutes. Wexford had a two-point lead with ten minutes to go, however, three points from Jimmy Barry-Murphy, two from Pat Moylan and a kicked effort from Ray Cummins gave Cork a 2–21 to 4–11 victory.

Cork faced Clare in the Munster decider in 1977, however, Murphy's side won by 4–15 to 4–10. The subsequent All-Ireland final on 4 September 1977 was a repeat of the previous year, with Wexford providing the opposition once again. Martin Coleman brought off a match-winning save from Christy Keogh to foil the Wexford comeback in the dying seconds and a 1–17 to 3–8 victory gave Cork a second successive All-Ireland title.

In 1978 Murphy was still a key member of the selection team as Cork secured a fourth successive Munster title following a 0–13 to 0–11 defeat of Clare in a dour provincial decider. This victory paved the way for Cork to take on Kilkenny in the subsequent All-Ireland final. The game, however, was not the classic that many expected. Cork were never really troubled over the course of the seventy minutes and a Jimmy Barry-Murphy goal helped the team to a 1–15 to 2–8 victory over their age-old rivals. This victory gave Cork a third All-Ireland title in succession.

The following year Cork secured a fifth consecutive provincial title following a 2–14 to 0–9 defeat of Limerick, however, the team was later defeated by Galway in the All-Ireland semi-final.

== Honours ==
=== Player ===
University College Cork

- Fitzgibbon Cup (1): 1959

Grenagh

- Mid Cork Junior Hurling Championship (1): 1958

St Finbarr's

- Munster Senior Club Hurling Championship (1): 1965
- Cork Senior Club Hurling Championship (2): 1965, 1968

Cork

- All-Ireland Senior Hurling Championship (1): 1966
- Munster Senior Hurling Championship (2): 1966, 1969 (c)
- National Hurling League (1): 1968–69
- Munster Junior Hurling Championship (1): 1959

Munster

- Railway Cup (2): 1966, 1969

=== Selector ===
Cork

- All-Ireland Senior Hurling Championship (3): 1976, 1977, 1978
- Munster Senior Hurling Championship (4): 1976, 1977, 1978, 1979

=== Individual ===
Honours

- Munster Hurling Team of the Millennium: Left corner-back
- Munster Hurler of the Year (1): 1969
- Cú Chulainn Award (1): 1966
- Poc Fada Champion 1965

Sporting positions
Preceded by Jerry O'Sullivan	Cork Senior Hurling Captain; 1969	Succeeded by Paddy Barry
