= 1970 All-Ireland Senior Hurling Championship =

Championship details
- Dates: 3 May – 6 September 1970
- Teams: 14

All-Ireland champions
- Winning team: Cork (21st win)
- Captain: Paddy Barry

All-Ireland Finalists
- Losing team: Wexford
- Captain: Michael Collins

Provincial champions
- Munster: Cork
- Leinster: Wexford
- Ulster: Not Played
- Connacht: Not Played

Championship statistics
- No. matches played: 14
- Goals total: 71 (5.07 per game)
- Points total: 312 (22.28 per game)
- Top Scorer: Charlie McCarthy (1–23)
- Player of the Year: Pat McDonnell
- All-Star Team: See here

The 1970 All-Ireland Senior Hurling Championship was the 84th staging of the All-Ireland Senior Hurling Championship, the Gaelic Athletic Association's premier inter-county hurling tournament. The championship began on 3 May 1970 and ended on 6 September 1970.

Kilkenny were the defending champions but were defeated by Wexford in the Leinster final. Kildare, who won the All-Ireland Intermediate Hurling Championship in 1969, were promoted to the senior championship after a long absence. New York sought entry to the All-Ireland series but their request was denied. Galway left the Munster Championship after ten years of participation and reverted to the old system whereby they enter the championship at the All-Ireland semi-final stage.

The All-Ireland final was played at Croke Park in Dublin on 6 September 1970 between Cork and Wexford, in what was their fourth meeting in the All-Ireland final overall and a first meeting in 14 years. Cork won the match by 6–21 to 5–10 to claim their 21st All-Ireland title overall and a first title in four years.

Cork's Charlie McCarthy was the championship's top scorer with 1–23. Cork's Pat McDonnell was the choice for Texaco Hurler of the Year.

== Rule change ==
As a result of a decision taken at the Gaelic Athletic Association's (GAA) annual congress the previous year, as of 1970 all provincial finals, All-Ireland semi-finals and the All-Ireland final itself were extended to 80 minutes playing time. Prior to this all championship matches were sixty minutes in duration. Lasted until 1974.

== Teams ==
A total of fourteen teams contested the championship, including thirteen teams from the 1969 championship and one new entrant.

The Leinster championship was extended to seven teams as Kildare entered the provincial series of games. They had won the All-Ireland title at intermediate level in 1969 and decided to make the step up to the senior grade.

Galway left the Munster championship where they had been playing since the 1959 championship and returned to the old system whereby they entered the All-Ireland semi-finals.

=== Team summaries ===
Team	Colours	Grounds	Most recent success		
Team	Colours	Grounds	All-Ireland	Provincial	League
Clare	Saffron and blue	Cusack Park	1914	1932	1945–46
Cork	Red and white	Cork Athletic Grounds	1966	1969	1969–70
Dublin	Blue and navy	Parnell Park	1938	1961	1938–39
Galway	Maroon and white	Pearse Stadium	1923		1950–51
Kildare	White	St. Conleth's Park			
Kilkenny	Black and amber	Nowlan Park	1969	1969	1965–66
Laois	Blue and white	O'Moore Park	1949	1949	
Limerick	Green and white	Gaelic Grounds	1940	1955	1946–47
London	Blue and green	Emerald GAA Grounds	1901		
Offaly	Green, white and gold	St. Brendan's Park			
Tipperary	Blue and gold	Semple Stadium	1965	1968	1967–68
Waterford	White and blue	Walsh Park	1959	1963	1962–63
Westmeath	Maroon and white	Cusack Park			
Wexford	Purple and gold	Wexford Park	1968	1968	1957–58

== Leinster Senior Hurling Championship ==
=== Leinster first round ===
3 May 1970
First round
3:30pm

Laois	1–9 – 1–8	Kildare
P. Dillon (0–4), G. Conroy (1–0), P. Dowling (0–1), P. Dooley (0–1), T. Keenan (0–1), J. Lyons (0–1), F. Keenan (0–1).		B. Burke (0–2), J. O'Brien (0–2), T. Christian (0–1), J. O'Connell (0–1), M. Duane (0–1).

Nowlan Park, Kilkenny
Referee: P. Johnston (Kilkenny)

=== Leinster second round ===
3 May 1970
Second round
3:30pm

Dublin	0–16 – 3–5	Westmeath
G. O'Driscoll (0–5), E. Davey (0–4), T. Grealish (0–2), L. Lalor (0–2), F. Murphy (0–2), H. Dawson (0–1).		T. Ring (2–3), C. Gavin (1–0), P. McCabe (0–1), S. White (0–1).

O'Connor Park, Tullamore
Referee: P. Buggy (Kilkenny)

24 May 1970
Second round
3:30pm

Offaly	2–15 – 2–9	Laois
B. Moylan (0–7), T. Molloy (1–3), P. Mulhaire (1–1), J. J. Healy (0–1), J. Flaherty (0–1), M. Cleare (0–1), P. J. Whelehan (0–1).		S. Keenan (1–2), J. Loyans (1–2), N. Delany (0–2), J. Dooly (0–1), P. Dowling (0–1), D. Sheeran (0–1).

St. Brendan's Park, Birr
Referee: R. Sheppard (Carlow)

=== Leinster semi-finals ===
21 June 1970
Semi-final
3:30pm

Wexford	4–17 – 2–4	Dublin
N. Buggy (1–7), T. Doran (2–1), D. Fortune (1–0), P. Quigley (0–2), D. Quigley (0–2), J. Quigley (0–2), J. Berry (0–1), P. Wilson (0–1), M. Browne (0–1).		E. Flynn (1–3), J. Towell (1–0), R. Copeland (0–1).

Nowlan Park, Kilkenny
Referee: P. Johnston (Kilkenny)

28 June 1970
Semi-final
3:30pm

Kilkenny	2–15 – 1–12	Offaly
E. Keher (0–9), M. Crotty (2–0), J. Kinsella (0–2), P. Delaney (0–2), S. Muldowney (0–1), J. Millea (0–1).		T. Dooley (1–0), P. Molloy (0–3), J. Flaherty (0–3), B. Moylan (0–1), W. O'Gorman (0–1), S. Begin (0–1), P. J. Whelehan (0–1), J. J. Healion (0–1), D. Hanniffy (0–1).

Croke Park, Dublin
Referee: J. Grey (Dublin)

=== Leinster final ===
12 July 1970
Final
3:30pm

Wexford	4–16 – 3–14	Kilkenny
N. Buggy (0–8), T. Doran (2–0), J. Quigley (1–2), J. Berry (1–0), P. Wilson (0–2), M. Quigley (0–2), P. Quigley (0–1), D. Bernie (0–1).		P. Delaney (1–4), E. Keher (1–3), M. Crotty (1–0), F. Cummins (0–3), P. Kavanagh (0–2), J. Millea (0–1), M. Coogan (0–1).

Croke Park, Dublin
Referee: J. Hatton (Wicklow)

== Munster Senior Hurling Championship ==
=== Munster first round ===
14 June 1970
First round
3:30pm

Limerick	3–9 – 2–12	Clare
P. K. Keane (1–1), R. Bennis (0–4), D. Flynn (1–0), T. Bluett (1–0), B. Hartigan (0–1), Phil Bennis (0–1), Peter Bennis (0–1), A. Dunworth (0–1).		P. Cronin (1–8), P. McNamara (1–0), D. Fitzgerald (0–2), J. Rochford (0–1), J. McNamara (0–1).

Thurles Sportsfield, Thurles
Referee: F. Murphy (Cork)

21 June 1970
First round
replay
3:30pm

Limerick	1–10 – 0–4	Clare
R. Bennis (0–4), P. J. Keane (1–0), É. Cregan (0–2), P. Bennis (0–2), A. Dunworth (0–1), T. Ryan (0–1).		M. Moroney (0–1), J. Rochford (0–1), D. Fitzgerald, J. Cronin.

Gaelic Grounds, Limerick
Referee: F. Murphy (Cork)

=== Munster semi-finals ===
21 June 1970
Semi-final
3:30pm

Tipperary	2–9 – 0–5	Waterford
M. Roche (0–5), R. Ryan (1–1), N. O'Dwyer (1–0), J. McKenna (0–1), J. Flanagan (0–1), T. O'Connor (0–1).		P. Enright (0–4), S. Greene (0–5).

Cork Athletic Grounds, Cork
Referee: S. O'Connor (Limerick)

28 June 1970
Semi-final
3:30pm

Cork	4–13 – 3–6	Limerick
E. O'Brien (2–0), C. McCarthy (0–5), P. Hegarty (1–2), R. Cummins (1–0), G. McCarthy (0–3), S. Barry (0–2), C. Cullinane (0–1).		M. Graham (2–2), T. Bluett (1–0), R. Bennis (0–3), P. J. Keane (0–1).

Thurles Sportsfield, Thurles
Referee: J. Maloney (Tipperary)

=== Munster final ===
19 July 1970
Final
3:30pm

Cork	3–10 – 3–8	Tipperary
W. Walsh (2–0), C. Cullinane (1–0), C. McCarthy (0–3), G. McCarthy (0–2), D. Clifford (0–1), C. Roche (0–1), J. Murphy (0–1), T. Ryan (0–1), R. Cummins (0–1).		F. Loughnane (1–4), J. Flanagan (1–0), N. O'Dwyer (1–0), D. Ryan (0–2), M. Roche (0–1), P.J. Ryan (0–1).

Gaelic Grounds, Limerick
Referee: J. Fitzgerald (Limerick)

== All-Ireland Senior Hurling Championship ==
=== All-Ireland semi-finals ===
16 August 1970
Semi-Final
3:30pm

Cork	4–20 – 2–09	London
T. Ryan (1–5), R. Cummins (1–3), C. McCarthy (0–6), W. Walsh (1–2), E. O'Brien (1–0), S. Barry (0–2), D. Coughlan (0–1), J. Murphy (0–1).		P. O'Neill (0–4), T. Connolly (0–1), N. Power (1–0), J. Bennett (1–0), M. Canning (0–3), L. Corless (0–1).

Gaelic Grounds, Limerick
Referee: M. Spain (Offaly)

16 August 1970
Semi-Final
3:30pm

Wexford	3–17 – 5–09	Galway
M. Butler (0–9), D. Quigley (1–2), D. Bernie (0–4), J. Quigley (1–1), T. Doran (1–0), M. Quigley (0–1).		T. Ryan (3–5), B. O'Connor (1–1), K. Kennedy (1–0), P. Niland (0–1), F. Coffey (0–1), M. O'Connor (0–1).

St. Ciarán's Park, Athlone
Referee: S, O'Connor (Limerick)

=== All-Ireland final ===
6 September 1970
Final
3:15pm

Cork	6–21 – 5–10	Wexford
C. McCarthy (1–9), E. O'Brien (3–1), T. Ryan (0–6), W. Walsh (1–2), C. Cullinane (1–0), G. McCarthy (0–2), R. Cummins (0–1).		P. Quigley (2–0), T. Doran (2–0), D. Quigley (1–0), D. Bernie (0–3), M. Butler (0–3), T. Byrne (0–2), M. Browne (0–1), M. Jacob (0–1).

Croke Park, Dublin
Attendance: 65,062
Referee: J. Hatton (Wicklow)

== Championship statistics ==
=== Scoring ===
- Widest winning margin: 19 points
  - Wexford 4–17 : 2–4 Dublin (Leinster semi-final)
- Most goals in a match: 11
  - Cork 6–21 : 5–10 Wexford (All-Ireland final)
- Most points in a match: 31
  - Cork 6–21 : 5–10 Wexford (All-Ireland final)
- Most goals by one team in a match: 6
  - Cork 6–21 : 5–10 Wexford (All-Ireland final)
- Most goals scored by a losing team: 5
  - Wexford 5–10 : 6–21 Cork (All-Ireland final)
  - Galway 5–9 : 3–17 Wexford (All-Ireland semi-final)
- Most points scored by a losing team: 14
  - Kilkenny 3–14 : 4–16 Wexford (Leinster final)

=== Miscellaneous ===
- The Leinster final between Kilkenny and Wexford was the first championship game to be played over the course of 80 minutes.

== Top scorers ==
=== Season ===
Rank	Player	County	Tally	Total	Matches	Average
1	Charlie McCarthy	Cork	1–23	26	4	6.50
2	Tony Doran	Wexford	7–1	22	4	5.50
3	Eddie O'Brien	Cork	6–1	19	4	4.75
4	Ned Buggy	Wexford	1–15	18	4	4.50
5	Willie Walsh	Cork	4–4	16	4	4.00
5	Eddie Keher	Galway	1–12	15	2	7.50
5	Tomás Ryan	Cork	1–12	15	3	5.00
8	Tom Ryan	Galway	3–5	14	1	14.00
9	Mick Butler	Wexford	0–12	12	2	6.00
10	Ray Cummins	Cork	2–5	11	4	2.75
10	Richie Bennis	Limerick	0–11	11	3	3.66

=== Single game ===
Rank	Player	County	Tally	Total	Opposition
1	Tom Ryan	Galway	3–5	14	Wexford
2	Charlie McCarthy	Cork	1–9	12	Wexford
3	Pat Cronin	Clare	1–8	11	Limerick
4	Ned Buggy	Wexford	1–7	10	Dublin
4	Eddie O'Brien	Cork	3–1	10	Wexford
6	Eddie Keher	Kilkenny	0–9	9	Dublin
6	Tommy Ring	Westmeath	2–3	9	Dublin
6	Mick Butler	Wexford	0–9	9	Galway
9	Ned Buggy	Wexford	0–8	8	Kilkenny
9	Tomás Ryan	Cork	1–5	8	London

=== Hat-tricks ===
Player	For	Against	Result	Date
Tom Ryan	Galway	Wexford	5–9 : 3–17	16 August 1970
Eddie O'Brien	Cork	Wexford	6–21 : 5–10	6 September 1970

== Player facts ==
=== Debutantes ===
The following players made their début in the 1970 championship:

Player	Team	Date	Opposition	Game
Paul Byrne	Tipperary	June 21	Waterford	Munster semi-final
Roger Ryan	Tipperary	June 21	Waterford	Munster semi-final
John Horgan	Cork	June 28	Limerick	Munster semi-final
Pat McDonnell	Cork	June 28	Limerick	Munster semi-final
Dinny Ryan	Tipperary	July 19	Cork	Munster final
Martin Coleman	Cork	August 16	London	All-Ireland semi-final

Tom Byrne

Wexford August 15 Galway All-Ireland semi-final

== Awards ==
=== Annual awards ===
==== Texaco Hurler of the Year ====
The Texaco Hurler of the Year was awarded to Pat McDonnell of Cork.
