= Tommy Murphy (hurler) =

Irish hurler (1942–2022)

Personal information
- Native name: Tomás Ó Murchú (Irish)
- Nickname: Fr. Tommy
- Born: 1942 The Rower, County Kilkenny, Ireland
- Died: 14 November 2022 (aged 80) Ballyragget, County Kilkenny, Ireland
- Occupation: Roman Catholic priest
- Height: 5 ft 11 in (180 cm)

Sport
- Sport: Hurling
- Position: Left corner-forward
Club
- Years: Club
- Rower–Inistioge
Club titles
- Kilkenny titles: 1
Inter-county
- Years: County
- 1963-1969: Kilkenny
Inter-county titles
- Leinster titles: 4
- All-Irelands: 2
- NHL: 0

Thomas Murphy (1943 – 14 November 2022) was an Irish hurler. He played for his local club Rower–Inistioge and was a member of the Kilkenny senior inter-county team from 1963 until 1969.

== Death ==
Thomas Murphy died on 14 November 2022, at the age of 80.

== Playing career ==
=== Rower–Inistioge ===
Murphy began his hurling career at club level with Rower–Inistioge. After coming to prominence as an 11-year-old member of the club's successful under-14 team, he progressed through the juvenile and underage ranks before eventually joining the club's senior team. The high point of Murphy's club career occurred on 27 April 1969 when he claimed a Kilkenny Senior Championship title after a 3-09 to 3-07 defeat of Bennettsbridge in the 1968 final.

=== Kilkenny ===
==== Minor and intermediate ====
Murphy first played for Kilkenny as a 16-year-old when he was drafted onto the minor team for the 1960 Leinster Championship. He won a Leinster Minor Championship medal in his debut year after the 6-14 to 5-05 win over Wexford. Murphy later won an All-Ireland medal after scoring a hat-trick of goals in the 7-12 to 1-11 final defeat of Tipperary.

After missing the following year's minor championship due to his priesthood studies, Murphy was drafted onto the Kilkenny intermediate team for the 1963 Leinster Championship.

==== Senior ====
Murphy's performance in the intermediate grade drew the attention of the senior selectors and he was one of a number of players promoted to the Kilkenny senior team prior to the start of the 1963 Leinster Championship. He made his first appearance in the senior ranks on 7 July 1963 when he scored a goal in a 4-09 to 3-08 defeat of Wexford. Murphy subsequently lined out in his first Leinster final and claimed his first winners' medal after the 2-10 to 0-09 defeat of Dublin. On 1 September 1963, he was selected at left corner-forward against Waterford in an All-Ireland final. He scored 2-01 from play and claimed his first All-Ireland medal after the 4-17 to 6-08 victory.

After collecting a second consecutive provincial title after the 4-11 to 1-08 defeat of Dublin in the 1964 Leinster final, Murphy lined out in a second consecutive All-Ireland final on 6 September 1964. In spite of being regarded as the favourites, Kilkenny ended the game as runners-up after a 5-13 to 2-08 defeat by Tipperary.

Murphy claimed his third provincial winners' medal as a substitute after a 1-15 to 2-06 defeat of Wexford in the 1966 Leinster final. On 4 September 1966, he again started the game on the bench when Kilkenny faced Cork in the All-Ireland final. Murphy was introduced as a substitute for Pa Dillon at full-forward but ended on the losing side after a 3-09 to 1-10 defeat.

Murphy's priesthood studies impacted on his hurling career on a number of occasions over the following years, however, he claimed his fourth provincial winners' medal after lining out as a substitute in the 3-09 to 0-16 defeat of Offaly in the final. On 7 September 1969, Murphy was again included amongst the substitutes when he claimed his second All-Ireland winners' medal after the 2-15 to 2-09 victory over Cork. It was his last major game with the Kilkenny senior team.
