= 1969 All-Ireland Senior Hurling Championship =

Championship details
- Dates: 25 May – 7 September 1969
- Teams: 13

All-Ireland champions
- Winning team: Kilkenny (17th win)
- Captain: Eddie Keher

All-Ireland Finalists
- Losing team: Cork
- Captain: Denis Murphy

Provincial champions
- Munster: Cork
- Leinster: Kilkenny
- Ulster: Not Played
- Connacht: Not Played

Championship statistics
- No. matches played: 12
- Top Scorer: Paddy Molloy (8–18)
- Player of the Year: Ted Carroll
- All-Star Team: See here

The All-Ireland Senior Hurling Championship of 1969 was the 83rd staging of Ireland's premier hurling knock-out competition. Kilkenny won the championship, beating Cork 2–15 to 2–9 in the final at Croke Park, Dublin.

== The championship ==
=== Participating counties ===
Province	County	Most recent success	
Province	County	All-Ireland	Provincial
Leinster	Dublin	1938	1961
	Kilkenny	1967	1967
	Laois	1915	1949
	Offaly		
	Westmeath		
	Wexford	1968	1968
Munster	Clare	1914	1932
	Cork	1966	1966
	Galway	1923	1922
	Limerick	1940	1955
	Tipperary	1965	1968
	Waterford	1959	1963
Britain	London	1901	

=== Format ===
==== Leinster Championship ====
First round: (1 match) This is a single match between two of the weaker teams drawn from the province of Leinster. One team is eliminated at this stage, while the winners advance to the quarter-final.

Quarter-final: (1 match) This is a single match between the winner of the first round and another team drawn from the province of Leinster. One team is eliminated at this stage, while the winners advance to the semi-finals.

Semi-finals: (2 matches) The winners of the quarter-final join three other Leinster teams to make up the semi-final pairings. Two teams are eliminated at this stage, while two teams advance to the Leinster final.

Final: (1 match) The winners of the two semi-finals contest this game. One team is eliminated at this stage, while the winners advance to the All-Ireland semi-final.

==== Munster Championship ====
Quarter-final: (2 matches) These are two lone matches between the first four teams drawn from the province of Munster. Two teams are eliminated at this stage, while two teams advance to the semi-finals.

Semi-finals: (2 matches) The winners of the two quarter-finals join the other two Munster teams to make up the semi-final pairings. Two teams are eliminated at this stage, while two teams advance to the final.

Final: (1 match) The winners of the two semi-finals contest this game. One team is eliminated at this stage, while the winners advance to the All-Ireland final.

==== All-Ireland Championship ====
Semi-final: (1 match) This is a lone match between London and the Leinster champions. One team is eliminated at this stage, while the winner advances to the All-Ireland final.

Final: (1 match) The semi-final winner and the Munster champions contest the final.

== Fixtures ==
=== Munster Senior Hurling Championship ===
June 1
Quarter-Final

Waterford	1–12 – 3–18	Tipperary
T. Walsh (0–9), M. Hickey (2–1), P. Enright (0–1), D. Mahon (0–1).		J. Doyle (1–8), M. Keating (1–5), J. Flanagan (1–1), M. Roche (0–2), S. McLoughlin (0–1), F. Loughnane (0–1).

Walsh Park Waterford
Referee: M. Slattery (Clare)

June 15
Quarter-Final

Cork	3–8 – 1–4	Clare
C. McCarthy (3–1), E. O'Brien (0–3), P. Hegarty (0–2), C. Cullinane (0–1), W. Walsh (0–1).		T. Ryan (0–4), L. Danaher (1–0).

Thurles Sportsfield, Thurles
Attendance: 21,200
Referee: S. O'Connor (Limerick)

June 22
Semi-Final

Tipperary	0–14 – 2–5	Limerick
J. Doyle (0–5), M. Keating (0–4), F. Loughnane (0–3), D. Nealon (0–1), J. Flanagan (0–1).		T. Bluett (2–0), E. Cregan (0–3), M. Dowling (0–1), A. Dunworth (0–1).

Cork Athletic Grounds Cork
Referee: M. Slattery (Clare)

June 29
Semi-Final

Cork	3–15 – 1–10	Galway
C. McCarthy (1–5), C. Cullinane (1–2), W. Walsh (1–2), P. Hegarty (0–3), G. McCarthy (0–2), D. Coughlan (0–1).		J. Connolly (0–4), B. O'Connor (1–0), P. Mitchell (0–2), D. Coen (0–2), M. O'Connor (0–1), P. Fahy (0–1).

Gaelic Grounds, Limerick
Attendance: 10,000
Referee: G. Fitzgerald (Limerick)

July 27
Final

Cork	4–6 – 0–9	Tipperary
W. Walsh (3–0), C. McCarthy (1–1), P. Hegarty (0–2), D. Coughlan (0–2), T. Ryan (0–1).		J. Doyle (0–5), J. Flanagan (0–1), S. McLoughlin (0–1), N. O'Dwyer (0–1), P. J. Ryan (0–1).

Gaelic Grounds, Limerick
Attendance: 43,569
Referee: S. O'Connor (Limerick)

=== Leinster Senior Hurling Championship ===
May 25
First Round

Laois	5–12 – 0–1	Westmeath
P. Bates (2–4), J. Cuddy (1–1), G. Conroy (1–1), T. Keenan (1–1), J. Lyons (0–2), J. Dooley (0–1), P. Dowling (0–1), E. Jones (0–1).		P. Bradley (0–1).

O'Connor Park, Tullamore
Referee: J. Dowling (Offaly)

June 15
Quarter-Final

Laois	2–5 – 8–10	Offaly
C. O'Brien (2–0), P. Bates (0–3), P. Dowling (0–2).		P. Molloy (5–4), T. Dooley (2–0), W. Gorman (1–1), J. Healion (0–3), G. Burke (0–1), P. Mulhaire (0–1).

O'Moore Park, Portlaoise
Referee: P. Johnston (Kilkenny)

June 22
Semi-Final

Kilkenny	2–20 – 2–6	Dublin
E. Keher (1–10), P. Moran (1–0), M. Lawlor (0–3), P. Lawlor (0–3), J. Kinsella (0–2), J. Millea (0–1), P. Delaney (0–1).		J. Dolan (1–1), N. Kinsella (1–0), E. Flynn (0–3), A. Loughnane (0–1), D. Foley (0–1).

Wexford Park, Wexford
Attendance: 5,000
Referee: B. Stack (Laois)

June 29
Semi-Final

Offaly	5–10 – 3–11	Wexford
P. Molloy (3–4), J. Flaherty (1–3), W. Gorman (1–1), G. Burke (0–1), P. J. Whelehan (0–1).		T. Doran (2–3), M. Botler (1–1), P. Lynch (0–3), C. Jacob (0–2), W. Murphy (0–1), P. Sinnott (0–1).

Croke Park, Dublin
Referee: J. Rankin (Laois)

July 20
Final

Kilkenny	3–9 – 0–16	Offaly
P. Delaney (3–0), E. Keher (0–5), M. Brennan (0–2), J. Millea (0–1), J. Lynch (0–1).		P. Molloy (0–8), J. Flaherty (0–3), D. Hanniffy (0–2), P. Mulhaire (0–1), J. Kirwan (0–1), J. Healion (0–1).

Croke Park, Dublin
Referee: J. Gray (Dublin)

=== All-Ireland Senior Hurling Championship ===
August 17
Semi-Final

Kilkenny	3–22 – 1–10	London
Fr. T. Murphy (3–1), E. Keher (0–12), P. Kavanagh (0–3), P. Delaney (0–2), F. Cummins (0–1), S. Buckley (0–1), J. Millea (0–1), S. Cleere (0–1).		J. Bennett (0–5), T. Connolly (1–0), B. Barry (0–3), N. Power (0–1), P. Fahy (0–1).

Croke Park, Dublin
Referee: A. Higgins (Galway)

September 7
Final

Kilkenny	2–15 – 2–9	Cork
E. Keher (0–8), M. Brennan (1–1), J. Millea (1–0), M. Coogan (0–3), P. Kavanagh (0–1), P. Moran (0–1), M. Lawler (0–1).		C. McCarthy (1–6), P. Hegarty (1–1), E. O'Brien (0–1), G. McCarthy (0–1).

Croke Park, Dublin
Attendance: 66,844
Referee: S. O'Connor (Limerick)

Kilkenny	Cork

== Championship statistics ==
=== Scoring ===
- Hat-trick heroes:
  - First hat-trick of the championship: Charlie McCarthy for Cork against Clare (Munster quarter-final)
  - Second hat-trick of the championship: Paddy Molloy for Offaly against Laois (Leinster quarter-final)
  - Third hat-trick of the championship: Paddy Molloy for Offaly against Wexford (Leinster semi-final)
  - Fourth hat-trick of the championship: Willie Walsh for Cork against Tipperary (Munster final)
  - Fifth hat-trick of the championship:Fr. Tom Walsh for Kilkenny against London (All-Ireland semi-final)
- Widest winning margin: 26 points
  - Laois 5–12 : 0–1 Westmeath (Leinster first round)
- Most goals in a match: 10
  - Offaly 8–10 : 2–5 Laois (Leinster quarter-final)
- Most points in a match: 32
  - Kilkenny 3–22 : 1–10 London (All-Ireland semi-final)
- Most goals by one team in a match: 8
  - Offaly 8–10 : 2–5 Laois (Leinster quarter-final)
- Most goals scored by a losing team: 3
  - Wexford 3–11 : 5–10 Offaly (Leinster semi-final)
- Most points scored by a losing team: 12
  - Waterford 1–12 : 3–18 Tipperary(Munster quarter-final)

=== Miscellaneous ===
- Offaly reach the Leinster final for the first time since 1928.
- Kilkenny's 2–15 to 2–9 victory over Cork in the All-Ireland final was their biggest triumph over their archrivals since the 1905 All-Ireland final. The score on that occasion was 7–7 to 2–9.

== Top scorers ==
=== Season ===
Rank	Player	County	Tally	Total	Matches	Average
1	Paddy Molloy	Offaly	8–18	42	3	14.00
2	Eddie Keher	Kilkenny	1–35	38	4	9.50
3	Charlie McCarthy	Cork	6–13	31	4	7.75
4	Jimmy Doyle	Tipperary	1–18	21	3	7.00
5	Willie Walsh	Cork	4-03	15	4	3.75
6	Paddy Bates	Laois	2-07	13	2	6.50
7	Pat Delaney	Kilkenny	3-03	12	4	3.00
7	Michael Keating	Tipperary	1-09	12	3	4.00
8	Pat Hegarty	Cork	1-08	11	4	2.75
9	Tom Murphy	Kilkenny	3-01	10	2	5.00

=== Single game ===
Rank	Player	County	Tally	Total	Opposition
1	Paddy Molloy	Offaly	5-05	19	Laois
2	Paddy Molloy	Offaly	3-04	13	Wexford
2	Eddie Keher	Kilkenny	1–10	13	Dublin
4	Eddie Keher	Kilkenny	0–12	12	London
5	Jimmy Doyle	Tipperary	1-08	11	Waterford
6	Charlie McCarthy	Tipperary	3-01	10	Clare
6	Tom Murphy	Kilkenny	3-01	10	London
6	Paddy Bates	Laois	2-04	10	Westmeath
9	Willie Walsh	Cork	3-00	9	Tipperary
9	Pat Delaney	Kilkenny	3-00	9	Offaly
9	Tony Doran	Wexford	2-03	9	Offaly
9	Charlie McCarthy	Cork	1-06	9	Kilkenny
9	Tom Walsh	Waterford	0-09	9	Tipperary

=== Debutantes ===
The following players made their début in the 1969 championship:

Player	Team	Date	Opposition	Game
Paschal Russell	Clare	June 15	Cork	Munster quarter-final
Dónal Clifford	Cork	June 15	Clare	Munster quarter-final
Charlie Cullinane	Cork	June 15	Clare	Munster quarter-final
Pat Hegarty	Cork	June 15	Clare	Munster quarter-final
Tony Maher	Cork	June 15	Clare	Munster quarter-final
Roger Tuohy	Cork	June 15	Clare	Munster quarter-final
Willie Walsh	Cork	June 15	Clare	Munster quarter-final
Pat Delaney	Kilkenny	June 22	Dublin	Leinster semi-final
Mick Lawler	Kilkenny	June 22	Dublin	Leinster semi-final
Joe Millea	Kilkenny	June 22	Dublin	Leinster semi-final
Ray Cummins	Cork	July 27	Tipperary	Munster final
Séamus Looney	Cork	September 7	Kilkenny	All-Ireland final
Joe Murphy	Cork	September 7	Kilkenny	All-Ireland final

=== Retirees ===
The following players played their last game in the 1969 championship:

Player	Team	Last Game	Date	Opposition	Début
Naoise Jordan	Clare	Leinster final	June 15	Cork	1958
Éamonn Russell	Clare	Leinster final	June 15	Cork	1962
Tom Ryan	Clare	Leinster final	June 15	Cork	1958
Éamonn Fox	Offaly	Leinster final	July 20	Kilkenny	1963
Mick Burns	Tipperary	Munster final	July 27	Cork	1958
Seán McLoughlin	Tipperary	Munster final	July 27	Cork	1958
Donie Nealon	Tipperary	Munster final	July 27	Cork	1958
Noel O'Gorman	Tipperary	Munster final	July 27	Cork	1965
Denis Murphy	Cork	All-Ireland final	September 7	Kilkenny	1960
Joe Murphy	Cork	All-Ireland final	September 7	Kilkenny	1969
Tom Murphy	Kilkenny	All-Ireland final	September 7	Cork	1963
