= Fran Whelan =

Irish hurler

Personal information
- Born: 1937 (age 88–89)

Sport
- Sport: Hurling
- Position: Right wing-back
Club
- Years: Club
- Eoghan Ruadh

Fran Whelan (born 1937) is an Irish retired hurler who played as a right wing-back for club side Eoghan Ruadh and at inter-county level with the Dublin senior hurling team.

== Honours ==
Dublin

- Leinster Senior Hurling Championship (1): 1961
