= Noel Gallagher (hurler) =

Irish hurler

Personal information
- Born: 1939 (age 86–87) Youghal, County Cork, Ireland
- Occupation: Secondary school deputy principal
- Height: 5 ft 9 in (175 cm)

Sport
- Sport: Hurling
- Position: Midfield
Clubs
- Years: Club
- Youghal; Imokilly; University College Cork; University College Dublin; Bandon
Club titles
- Cork titles: 1
College(s)
- Years: College
- University College Cork; University College Dublin
College titles
- Fitzgibbon titles: 1
Inter-county*
Years	County	Apps (scores)
1959-1965	Cork	13 (4-07)
Inter-county titles
- Munster titles: 0
- All-Irelands: 0
- NHL: 0
- *Inter County team apps and scores correct as of 00:07, 1 July 2018.

Noel Gallagher (born 1939) is an Irish retired hurler. Playing at both midfield and half-forward positions, he was a member of the Cork senior team from 1959 until 1965.

Gallagher first played inter-county hurling as a dual player with the Cork minor teams in 1956 and 1957. He subsequently joined the Cork junior hurling team, winning an All-Ireland medal in 1958. Gallagher was later added to the Cork senior team, making his debut during the 1959 championship. He was a regular member of the team over the following six season, and his senior career ended after the 1965 championship. Four years later, Gallagher was a late addition to the Cork intermediate team. He ended the season as an All-Ireland runner-up.

== Honours ==
University College Cork

- Cork Senior Hurling Championship: 1963
- Fitzgibbon Cup (1): 1959

University College Dublin

- Dublin Senior Hurling Championship: 1961

Youghal

- Cork Intermediate Hurling Championship: 1955, 1969

Bandon

- West Cork Junior A Hurling Championship: 1977

Cork

- All-Ireland Junior Hurling Championship: 1958
- Munster Junior Hurling Championship: 1958
