= Tom Ryan (Killenaule hurler) =

Irish hurler (1941–2023)

Personal information
- Native name: Tomás Ó Riain (Irish)
- Born: 1941 Killenaule, County Tipperary, Ireland
- Died: 13 March 2023 (aged 81) Manchester, England
- Occupation: Assurance inspector
- Height: 5 ft 10 in (178 cm)

Sport
- Sport: Hurling
- Position: Midfield
Clubs
- Years: Club
- Killenaule; Éire Óg, Nenagh; Éire Óg, Ennis; Liam Mellows; James Stephens
Club titles
- Galway titles: 1
- Connacht titles: 1
Inter-county
Years	County	Apps (scores)
1959-1964; 1966 1967-1969 1970-1972	Tipperary; Clare; Galway	14 (3-08); 6 (3-09); 4 (7-13)
Inter-county titles
- Munster titles: 3
- All-Irelands: 2
- NHL: 3

Thomas Anthony Ryan (1941 – 13 March 2023) was an Irish hurler. At club level he played with Killenaule, Éire Óg, Nenagh, Éire Óg, Ennis, Liam Mellows and James Stephens, while at inter-county level he lined out with Tipperary, Clare and Galway.

== Career ==
Ryan first played hurling at juvenile level with the New Tipperary Rangers team. Following the demise of that team, he lined out with Killenaule and captained the team to the South MHC title in 1958. He also lined out as a schoolboy with Thurles CBS, however, his two years in the Harty Cup competition ended without success.

Ryan first appeared on the inter-county scene as a dual player at minor level. He was at midfield when Tipperary beat Kilkenny in the 1959 All-Ireland minor hurling final. Ryan immediately progressed to the senior team and won National League and Munster SHC medals in his debut season in 1960. He claimed a second set of league and provincial titles the following year, before winning his first All-Ireland SHC medal after a defeat of Dublin in the final. Ryan also captained Killenaule to the South SHC title that year.

Ryan won a third consecutive Munster SHC title in 1962. He later claimed a second consecutive All-Ireland medal after scoring a vital goal in a defeat of Wexford in the 1962 All-Ireland final. Ryan won a Railway Cup medal with Munster in 1963, before winning a third and final league title in 1964. He subsequently fell out of favour with the Tipperary selectors and was dropped from the team, however, he was recalled in 1966.

By this stage, Ryan had transferred to the Éire Óg club in Nenagh before later transferring to a similarly-named club in Ennis. He spent three seasons with the Clare senior hurling team, during which time he lined out against Tipperary in the 1967 Munster final. Ryan later won a Connacht Club SHC title with Liam Mellows, while he also had a three-year tenure with the Galway senior hurling team. His professional life once again resulted in a club transfer, this time to the James Stephens club in Kilkenny, before ending his club career back with Killenaule.

== Death ==
Ryan died in Manchester, England on 13 March 2023, aged 81.

== Honours ==
Killenaule

- South Tipperary Senior Hurling Championship: 1961 (c), 1963
- South Tipperary Minor Hurling Championship: 1958

Liam Mellows

- Connacht Senior Club Hurling Championship: 1970
- Galway Senior Hurling Championship: 1970

Tipperary

- All-Ireland Senior Hurling Championship: 1961, 1962
- Munster Senior Hurling Championship: 1960, 1961, 1962
- National Hurling League: 1959-60, 1960-61, 1963-64
- All-Ireland Minor Hurling Championship: 1959
- Munster Minor Hurling Championship: 1959

Munster

- Railway Cup: 1963
