= 1970 Cork Intermediate Hurling Championship =

Irish hurling competition

- Date: 5 April - 4 October 1970
- Teams: 15
- Champions: Cloyne (2nd title); Bunty Cahill (captain)
- Runners-up: Castletownroche

Tournament statistics
- Matches played: 15
- Goals scored: 114 (7.6 per match)
- Points scored: 222 (14.8 per match)

The 1970 Cork Intermediate Hurling Championship was the 61st staging of the Cork Intermediate Hurling Championship since its establishment by the Cork County Board in 1909. The draw for the opening round fixtures took place on 25 January 1970. The championship began on 5 April and ended on 4 October 1970.

On 4 October 1970, Cloyne won the championship following a 2–18 to 4–06 defeat of Castletownroche in the final at Castlelyons Sportsfield. This was their second championship title overall and their first title since 1966.

== Team changes ==
=== To Championship ===
Promoted from the Cork Junior Hurling Championship

- Kanturk

=== From Championship ===
Promoted to the Cork Senior Hurling Championship

- Youghal

Regraded to the South East Junior Hurling Championship

- Carrigaline

== Results ==
=== First round ===
5 April 1970 First round	Cobh	5-02 - 3-03	Newtownshandrum	Moore Park
	J Ryan 2-1, J Carroll 1-0, D O'Brien 1-0, J Hallahan 1-0, C O'Donovan 0-1.		Phil Noonan 2-1, M Reidy 1-0, J Buckley 0-1, C Morrissey 0-1.	Referee: M Walsh (Mayfield)

5 April 1970 First round	Shamrocks	5-06 - 4-04	Kanturk	Cork Athletic Grounds
	G Hurley 1-5, J Driscoll 2-0, R Sisk 1-1, N Mahony 1-0.		P Cremin 1-1, F Fitzgerald 1-0, B O'Brien 1-0, J Mahony 1-0, D Murphy 0-1, B Mullane 0-1, D Kenneally 0-1.

12 April 1970 First round	Ballincollig	4-01 - 6-10	Brian Dillons	Ballinhassig Grounds
	D Forde 2-0, C Fogarty 1-0, J Holmes 1-0, P Murphy 0-1.		E Dorney 2-4, W Hegarty 2-0, W Horgan 1-0, G O'Connell 1-0, P Curley 0-3, P O'Connor 0-1, V O'Brien 0-1, D O'Mahony 0-1.

17 April 1970 First round	Carrigtwohill	4-08 - 2-03	Midleton	Páirc Uí Chonaill

19 April 1970 First round	Cloyne	6-04 - 3-01	Nemo Rangers	Carrigtwohill Grounds

3 May 1970 First round	Tracton	1-07 - 0-16	Mallow	Cork Athletic Grounds
	R Cronin 1-1, S Kelly 0-3, D Murphy 0-2, M Collins 0-1.		T Sheehan 0-6, B Barrett 0-4, L Sheehan 0-2, B Golden 0-1, P Carey 0-1, P Riordan 0-1, K Sheehan 0-1.

24 May 1970 First round	Glen Rovers	2-08 - 3-07	Kilworth	Riverstown Sportsfield
	B O'Connell 1-1, J Kelly 1-0, D Lynch 0-2, P Murphy 0-2, M Hackett 0-1, K Houlihan 0-1, F O'Brien 0-1.		D Fenton 1-2, C O'Callaghan 1-0, J Hanlon 1-0, J Hogan 0-2, D Conlon 0-1, T Conlon 0-1, S Casey 0-1.	Referee: D O'Brien (Cobh)

- Castletownroche received a bye in this round.

=== Quarter-finals ===
24 May 1970 Quarter-final	Castletownroche	4-10 - 3-02	Shamrocks	Riverstown Sportsfield
	J Magner 2-0, Dave Relihan 1-3, Dan Relihan 1-1, B O'Sullivan 0-3, K McSweeney 0-2, B Magner 0-1.		R Sisk 1-1, J O'Driscoll 1-0, D Kidney 1-0, D Hurley 0-1.

7 June 1970 Quarter-final	Cobh	4-11 - 1-08	KIlworth	Cork Athletic Grounds

5 July 1970 Quarter-final	Cloyne	2-11 - 3-08	Brian Dillons	Páirc Uí Chonaill

5 July 1970 Quarter-final	Carrigtwohill	10-03 - 7-07	Mallow	Páirc Mac Gearailt

26 July 1970 Quarter-final replay	Cloyne	7-11 - 2-07	Brian Dillons	Páirc Uí Chonaill

=== Semi-finals ===
2 August 1970 Semi-final	Castletownroche	8-15 - 4-05	Carrigtwohill	Riverstown Sportsfield

23 August 1970 Semi-final	Cloyne	2-11 - 2-09	Cobh	Páirc Uí Chonaill

=== Final ===
4 October 1970 Final	Cloyne	2-18 - 4-06	Castletowneroche	Castlelyons Sportsfield
	P Ring 0-12, D Motherway 1-4, J Aherne 1-1, M O'Brien 0-1.		R Browne 2-2, R Magnier 1-1, J McCarthy 1-0, K McSweeney 0-1, M Magnier 0-1, D Relihan 0-1.
