= 1967 Cork Senior Hurling Championship =

Annual hurling competition season

- Dates: 16 April – 8 October 1967
- Teams: 15
- Champions: Glen Rovers (21st title); Seánie Kennefick (captain)
- Runners-up: St. Finbarr's; Gerald McCarthy (captain)

Tournament statistics
- Matches played: 16
- Goals scored: 94 (5.88 per match)
- Points scored: 296 (18.5 per match)
- Top scorer(s): Pierce Freaney (3-24)

The 1967 Cork Senior Hurling Championship was the 79th staging of the Cork Senior Hurling Championship since its establishment by the Cork County Board in 1887. The championship began on 16 April 1967 and ended on 8 October 1967.

Avondhu were the defending champions, however, they were defeated by University College Cork in the first round.

On 8 October 1967, Glen Rovers won the championship following a 3–09 to 1–09 defeat of St. Finbarr's in the final. This was their 21st championship title overall and their first in three championship seasons.

Pierce Freaney of the St. Finbarr's club was the championship's top scorer with 3-24.

== Team changes ==
=== To Championship ===
Promoted from the Cork Intermediate Hurling Championship

- Cloyne

== Results ==
=== First round ===
16 April 1967 First round	Duhallow	5-08 - 5-11	Carrigdhoun	Coachford
	T Burke 3-0, B Buckley 0-8, D Kenneally 2-0.		JK Coleman 3-2, B Murphy 1-2, S Kelly 1-1, D Coleman 0-3, DJ Sheehan 0-1, J O'Flynn 0-1.

30 April 1967 First round	Seandún	1-06 - 2-08	St. Finbarr's	Cork Athletic Grounds, Cork
	D McDonnell 1-0, J Coughlan 0-2, B Heffernan 0-1, B Larkin 0-1, P Finn 0-1, A O'Sullivan 0-1.		M Archer 1-1, P Freaney 0-4, C Cullinane 1-0, C Roche 0-1, C McCarthy 0-1, G McCarthy 0-1.	Referee: M Horgan (Midleton)

30 April 1967 First round	Na Piarsaigh	5-14 - 4-04	Carbery	Ballinhassig
	B O'Leary 3-0, D Sheehan 2-1, S Gillen 0-5, P Allen 0-2, J Buckley 0-2, M Ellard 0-2, R Touhy 0-2.		G Holland 1-2, TJ Collins 1-1, G Dowling 1-0, DD Lyons 1-0, B Collins 0-1.	Referee: M Walsh (Mayfield)

14 May 1967 First round	Imokilly	2-07 - 3-06	Muskerry	Cork Athletic Grounds, Cork
	T Browne 0-6, T Meaney 1-1, J O'Connor 1-0.		T Ryan 0-6, J Long 1-0, M Downing 1-0, F Kelleher 1-0.

14 May 1967 First round	Avondhu	2-02 - 3-16	University College Cork	Castletownroche
	R Browne 1-0, W Fitzgibbon 1-0, J Hogan 0-1, F Sheedy 0-1.		S Barry 0-7, J O'Halloran 1-3, B Kenneally 1-1, N Morgan 1-0, D Clifford 0-3, R Lehane 0-2.

18 June 1967 First round	Cloyne	6-01 - 4-12	Sarsfields	Clonmult Memorial Park, Midleton
	M Duignam 3-0, P Ring 1-1, D Daly 1-0, M Ahern 1-0.		P Barry 2-1, D Hurley 1-1, P Lambe 1-1, N Long 0-3, M Barry 0-3, S O'Riordan 0-2, P Cashman 0-1.

18 June 1967 First round	Passage	1-05 - 4-12	Blackrock	Carrigaline
	E O'Brien 1-0, J McCarthy 0-3, J O'Reilly 0-1, J Coughlan 0-1.		W Galligan 1-3, J Bennett 1-2, T Kelly 1-1, N O'Keeffe 0-4, P Moylan 1-0, J O'Leary 0-1, J Redmond 0-1.	Referee: C Conway

=== Quarter-finals ===
15 June 1967 Quarter-final	Glen Rovers	3-09 - 1-06	University College Cork	Cork Athletic Grounds, Cork
	J Young 2-0, C Ring 1-2, P Harte 0-3, W Carroll 0-2, J Daly 0-1, T Corbett 0-1.		S Barry 1-3, J Blake 0-1, R Cummins 0-1, D Clifford 0-1.	Attendance: 9,504; Referee: M Walsh

18 June 1967 Quarter-final	Muskerry	3-13 - 4-08	Na Piarsaigh	Charlie Hurley Park, Bandon
	C Kelly 1-2, T Ryan 0-5, F Kelleher 1-0, H Ahern 1-0, K Murphy 0-3, B Fitton 0-2, J Long 0-1.		R Tuohy 2-0, M Ellard 1-2, S Gillen 0-4, P Sheehan 1-0, J Buckley 0-2.

9 July 1967 Quarter-final	Carrigdhoun	3-11 - 2-21	Blackrock	Manning Park, Passage
	D Coleman 1-2, JK Coleman 1-2, B Wylie 0-5, F Coleman 1-0, J Murphy 0-1, D McCarthy 0-1.		W Galligan 0-10, T Kelly 1-1, J Hayes 1-1, N O'Keeffe 0-4, P Moylan 0-2, D Bennett 0-2, M Waters 0-1.

9 July 1967 Quarter-final	St. Finbarr's	3-09 - 3-09	Sarsfields	Cork Athletic Grounds, Cork
	P Freaney 1-5, M Archer 1-0, C Cullinane 1-0, J Archer 0-2, E Philpott 0-1, G McCarthy 0-1.		M Barry 1-3, D Looney 1-2, D Hurley 1-0, P Lambe 0-1, S O'Riordan 0-1, N Long 0-1, P O'Riordan 0-1.

13 August 1967 Quarter-final replay	St. Finbarr's	2-14 - 2-07	Sarsfields	Cork Athletic Grounds, Cork
	C Roche 1-4, P Freaney 0-7, C Cullinane 1-1, T Kirby 0-1, C McCarthy 0-1.		P Barry 1-1, D Looney 1-0, P O'Riordan 0-3, JJ Long 0-1, R O'Rahilly 0-1, P Lambe 0-1.

=== Semi-finals ===
20 August 1967 Semi-final	Glen Rovers	4-11 - 3-14	Muskerry	Charlie Hurley Park, Bandon
	M Kenneally 1-1, D Moore 1-1, P Carroll 1-1, P Harte 0-4, A Flynn 1-0, J Young 0-2, T Corbett 0-1, J Daly 0-1.		M Malone 2-1, C Kelly 1-4, T Ryan 0-5, F Kelleher 0-2, J Holmes 0-1, P Duggan 0-1.

20 August 1967 Semi-final	St. Finbarr's	4-12 - 3-09	Blackrock	Cork Athletic Grounds, Cork
	P Freaney 2-4, C Cullinane 0-4, C McCarthy 1-0, G McCarthy 1-0, E Philpott 0-2, C Roche 0-1, M Archer 0-1.		B Galligan 1-6, J Bennett 1-1, J Redmond 1-0, S Murphy 0-1, F O'Mahony 0-1.

10 September 1967 Semi-final replay	Glen Rovers	2-09 - 1-04	Muskerry	Charlie Hurley Park, Bandon
	P Harte 1-6, M Kenneally 1-0, B Carroll 0-2, T Corbett 0-1.		F Kelleher 1-0, C Kelly 0-2, T Ryan 0-2.

=== Final ===
8 October 1967 Final	Glen Rovers	3-09 - 1-09	St. Finbarr's	Athletic Grounds, Cork
	M Kenneally 2-3, J Young 1-0, P Harte 0-4, A O'Flynn 0-1, W Carroll 0-1.		P Freaney 0-4, C McCarthy 1-0, G McCarthy 0-3, D Murphy 0-1, C Roche 0-1.	Referee: G Fitzgerald (Limerick)

== Championship statistics ==
=== Scoring ===
Top scorers overall

Rank	Player	Club	Tally	Total	Matches	Average
1	Pierce Freaney	St. Finbarr's	3-24	33	5	6.60
2	Billy Galligan	Blackrock	2-19	25	3	8.33
3	Patsy Harte	Glen Rovers	1-17	20	4	5.00
4	John Kevin Coleman	Carrigdhoun	4-06	18	2	9.00
4	Tomás Ryan	Muskerry	0-16	16	4	4.00
6	Mick Kenneally	Glen Rovers	4-04	16	4	4.00
7	Charlie Cullinane	St. Finbarr's	3-05	14	4	3.50
7	Connie Kelly	Muskerry	2-08	14	3	4.66
9	Seánie Barry	University College Cork	1-10	13	2	6.50
10	John Young	Glen Rovers	3-02	11	3	3.66
10	Paddy Barry	Sarsfields	3-02	11	3	3.66
10	Frank Kelleher	Muskerry	3-02	11	4	2.75

Top scorers in a single game

Rank	Player	Club	Tally	Total	Opposition
1	John Kevin Coleman	Carrigdhoun	3-02	11	Duhallow
2	Pierce Freaney	St. Finbarr's	2-04	10	Blackrock
2	Billy Galligan	Blackrock	0-10	10	Carrigdhoun
4	Tom Burke	Duhallow	3-00	9	Carrigdhoun
4	Barry O'Leary	Na Piarsaigh	3-00	9	Carbery
4	Mick Duignam	Cloyne	3-00	9	Sarsfields
4	Mick Kenneally	Glen Rovers	2-03	9	St. Finbarr's
4	Billy Galligan	Blackrock	1-06	9	St. Finbarr's
4	Patsy Harte	Glen Rovers	1-06	9	Muskerry
10	Pierce Freaney	St. Finbarr's	1-05	8	Sarsfields
10	Brendan Buckley	Duhallow	0-08	9−	Carrigdhoun

=== Miscellaneous ===
- On 15 June 1967, Christy Ring played his last championship game for Glen Rovers against University College Cork. He made his first championship appearance during the 1941 championship.
