= 1968–69 National Hurling League =

38th season of the National Hurling League

League details
- Dates: 13 October 1968 – 18 May 1969

League champions
- Winners: Cork (7th win)

Other division winners
- Division 2: Kildare

The 1968–69 National Hurling League was the 38th season of the NHL, an annual hurling competition for the GAA county teams.

== Division 1 ==
National Hurling League Division 1
- Season: 1968-69
- Champions: Cork; 7th National League title Captain: Denis Murphy
- Matches played: 58
- Top goalscorer: Paul Lynch (8-24)
- All statistics correct as of 15 January 2017.

Tipperary came into the season as defending champions of the 1967-68 season.

On 4 May 1969, Cork won the title after a 3-12 to 1-14 win over Wexford in the final. It was their 7th league title overall and their first since 1952-53.

In spite of finishing at the bottom of their respective groups, neither Galway of Laois were relegated as there was no promotion-relegation this season.

Wexford's Paul Lynch was the Division 1 top scorer with 8-24.

=== Division 1A table ===
Pos	Team	Pld	W	D	L	Diff	Pts	Notes
1	Wexford	5	5	0	0	64	10	Division 1 runners-up
2	Tipperary	4	3	0	1	24	6	
3	Kilkenny	5	2	0	3	6	4	
4	Offaly	5	2	0	3	-9	4	
5	Waterford	4	2	0	2	-26	4	
6	Laois	5	0	0	5	-59	0	

=== Group stage ===
13 October 1968	Waterford	4-12 - 3-7	Kilkenny	Walsh Park, Waterford
	T Walsh 3-5, V Connors 1-0, T Kirwan 0-3, J Kirwan 0-2, N Power 0-1, M Hickey 0-1.		E Keher 1-2, P Delaney 1-1, M McCarthy 1-0, P Moran 0-2, B Phelan 0-2.	Referee: T Foran (Tipperary)

27 October 1968	Kilkenny	2-15 - 2-8	Laois	Nowlan Park, Kilkenny
	E Keher 1-4, J Kinsella 1-4, M McCarthy 0-3, S Brennan 0-1, J Doherty 0-1, P Moran 0-1, W Harte 0-1.		G Cuddy 1-1, R Rochford 1-0, S Cuddy 0-3, P Dowling 0-2, T Cuddy 0-1, M Mahon 0-1.	Referee: P Ryan (Tipperary)

27 October 1968	Wexford	6-14 - 5-8	Offaly	Páirc Uí Shíocháin, Gorey
	S Barron 2-2, J Quigley 1-5, M Butler 2-0, J Berry 1-1, P Wilson 0-3, D Quigley 0-2, T Doran 0-1.		P Molloy 2-1, G Burke 1-1, P Dooley 1-0, J Flaherty 1-0, PJ Whelehan 0-4, B Johnson 0-1.	Attendance: 3,000; Referee: J McElhatton (Wicklow)

9 February 1969	Wexford	2-6 - 2-4	Kilkenny	Wexford Park, Wexford
	P Lynch 1-4, J O'Brien 1-0, P Wilson 0-1, S Whelan 0-1.		E Keher 1-3, P Delaney 1-1.	Referee: T Foran (Tipperary)

2 March 1969	Laois	2-5 - 5-10	Tipperary	O'Moore Park, Portlaoise
	S Bergin 1-1, T Keenan 1-0, A Lyons 0-2, G Conroy 0-1, R Rochford 0-1.		J Flanagan 2-1, A Ryan 1-2, N Dwyer 1-1, J Doyle 0-4, S O'Meara 1-0, N Seymour 0-1, L Gaynor 0-1.

9 March 1969	Waterford	5-10 - 6-2	Laois	Fraher Field, Dungarvan
	T Walsh 3-3, W Walsh 1-1, J Kirwan 1-0, F Whelan 0-3, P Enright 0-2, M Hickey 0-1.		J O'Mahony 2-0, R Rochford 1-1, G Conroy 1-0, S Bergin 1-0, J Lyons 1-0, P O'Mahony 0-1.	Referee: D O'Brien (Cork)

9 March 1969	Tipperary	2-14 - 3-12	Wexford	Thurles Sportsfield, Thurles
	J Doyle 0-10, N O'Dwyer 1-1, F Loughnane 1-0, J Flanagan 0-2, M Keating 0-1.		P Lynch 0-7, W Murphy 1-1, J Berry 1-1, T Doran 1-0, D Quigley 0-1, J Quigley 0-1, P Wilson 0-1.	Referee: P Buggy (Kilkenny)

9 March 1969	Kilkenny	6-7 - 2-5	Offaly	Nowlan Park, Kilkenny
	M Brennan 3-1, P Moran 1-2, P Treacy 1-0, L O'Brien 1-0, E Keher 0-2, P Delaney 0-2.		P Molloy 2-3, J Kennedy 0-1.

23 March 1969	Kilkenny	4-7 - 3-15	Tipperary	Nowlan Park, Kilkenny
	E Keher 2-3, M Brennan 1-1, B Phelan 1-0, C Dunne 0-2, L O'Brien 0-1.		S McLoughlin 2-1, PJ Ryan 1-3, J Doyle 0-5. J Flanagan 0-2, M Keating 0-2, D Nealon 0-2.	Referee: J Dowling (Offaly)

23 March 1969	Wexford	7-13 - 1-11	Waterford	O'Kennedy Park, New Ross
	P Lynch 2-5, P Wilson 2-3, J Berry 1-2, J Quigley 1-2, T Doran 1-0, D Bernie 0-1.		D Mahon 1-1, T Walsh 0-3, W Walsh 0-2, P Enright 0-2, J O'Brien 0-1, F Whelan 0-1, M McGrath 0-1.

23 March 1969	Offaly	1-11 - 3-4	Laois	St. Brendan's Park, Birr
	P Molloy 1-3, W Gorman 0-2, G Burke 0-2, J Flaherty 0-2, J Kirwan 0-1, T Dooley 0-1.		R Rochford 1-1, G Conroy 1-0, P Kelly 1-0, P Dillon 0-1, J Dooley 0-1, E Guing 0-1.

30 March 1969	Offaly	3-8 - 3-14	Tipperary	St. Brendan's Park, Birr
	P Molloy 1-2, W Gorman 1-0, JJ Healion 1-0, J Flaherty 0-3, M Loughnane 0-1, PJ Whelehan 0-1, G Burke 0-1.		J Doyle 1-6, J Flanagan 1-4, D Nealon 1-0, M Keating 0-3, M Roche 0-1.

30 March 1969	Laois	2-3 - 11-8	Wexford	O'Moore Park, Portlaoise
	T Keenan 1-1, J Conroy 1-0, J Lyons 0-2.		P Lynch 4-2, M Butler 2-2, T Doran 2-0, J Quigley 1-2, P Wilson 1-2, J Whelan 1-0.

13 April 1969	Offaly	4-15 - 2-2	Waterford	O'Moore Park, Portlaoise
	P Molloy 1-5, W Gorman 2-0, J Flaherty 1-4, PJ Whelehan 0-4, G Burke 0-2.		J Kirwan 1-1, J O'Brien 1-0, M Hickey 0-1.

=== Division 1B table ===
Pos	Team	Pld	W	D	L	Diff	Pts	Notes
1	Cork	4	4	0	0	26	8	Division 1 champions
2	Limerick	4	2	0	2	3	4	
3	Clare	4	1	1	2	3	3	
4	Dublin	4	1	1	2	-5	3	
5	Galway	4	1	0	3	-26	2	

=== Group stage ===
13 October 1968	Clare	7-12 - 3-6	Galway	Cusack Park, Ennis
	T Ryan 3-1, N Pyne 1-5, P McNamara 2-1, M Arthur 1-0, L Danaher 0-2, D Fitzgerald 0-2, J McNamara 0-1.		J Mahony 2-1, M Gohery 1-2, T Mitchell 0-2, M O'Connor 0-1, S Flaherty 0-1.

27 October 1968	Limerick	6-9 - 4-6	Clare	Gaelic Grounds, Limerick
	A Dunworth 2-2, E Cregan 1-2, M Graham 1-2, P Hartigan 1-1, P O'Brien 1-0, B Hartigan 0-2.		T Ryan 2-2, J McNamara 1-1, N Pyne 1-0, J Cullinane 0-2, L Danaher 0-1.	Referee: S Moloney (Tipperary)

24 November 1968	Galway	1-7 - 3-7	Cork	Pearse Stadium, Galway
	P Fahy 1-2, J Connolly 0-5.		C Cullinane 3-0, C McCarthy 0-2, T Ryan 0-2, M Walsh 0-1, P Hegarty 0-1.	Referee: E O'Brien (Westmeath)

2 February 1969	Cork	5-9 - 3-10	Dublin	Cork Athletic Grounds, Cork
	B Meade 2-4, C Cullinane 2-2, E O'Brien 1-1, T Ryan 0-2.		F Whelan 3-5, E Flynn 0-2, T Loughnane 0-2, J Wallace 0-1.	Referee: G Fitzgerald (Limerick)

9 February 1969	Cork	3-7 - 1-5	Limerick	Cork Athletic Grounds, Cork
	C McCarthy 1-4, C Cullinane 1-0, J McCarthy 1-0, T Ryan 0-2, B Meade 0-1.		E Cregan 1-4, A Dunworth 0-1.	Referee: S O'Meara (Tipperary)

9 February 1969	Dublin	3-6 - 2-4	Galway	Croke Park, Dublin
	F Whelan 1-4, A Loughnane 1-0, E Flynn 1-0, E Davey 0-1, J Wallace 0-1.		M O'Connor 2-0, B O'Connor 0-2, J Connolly 0-1, M O'Connell 0-1.	Referee: S Mac Giolla Chiaráin (Wicklow)

2 March 1969	Clare	2-5 - 3-8	Cork	Cusack Park, Ennis
	P McNamara 1-0, M Keane 1-0, J Cullinane 0-2, N Casey 0-1, P Cronin 0-1, M Arthur 0-1.		W Walsh 1-2, T Ryan 0-5, P Hegarty 1-1, B Scully 1-0.	Referee: S O'Meara (Tipperary)

9 March 1969	Limerick	4-12 - 4-7	Dublin	Gaelic Grounds, Limerick
	E Cregan 0-9, A Dunworth 2-1, B Hartigan 1-0, M Dowling 1-0, P O'Brien 0-2.		J Doran 2-3, F Whelan 1-3, T Grealish 1-0, N Kinsella 0-1.	Referee: S O'Meara (Tipperary)

23 March 1969	Galway	3-8 - 2-8	Limerick	Pearse Stadium, Galway
	D Coen 2-1, P Fahy 1-1, M O'Connor 0-4, J Connolly 0-2.		E Cregan 1-5, P Hartigan 1-1, B Hartigan 0-1, P O'Brien 0-1.

23 March 1969	Dublin	2-8 - 1-11	Clare	O'Toole Park, Dublin
	F Whelan 1-3, L Lawlor 1-0, T Loughnane 0-2, D Foley 0-2, N Kinsella 0-1.		L Danagher 0-6, T Ryan 1-0, P Russell 0-2, P Cronin 0-1, M Keane 0-1, N Pyne 0-1.	Referee: P Johnston (Kilkenny)

=== Knock-out stage ===
Semi-finals

13 April 1969 Semi-final	Tipperary	3-8 - 2-12	Cork	Thurles Sportsfield, Thurles
	J Doyle (1-2), M Keating (1-2), D Nealon (1-1), J Flanagan (0-1), L Gaynor (0-1), PJ Ryan (0-1).		C McCarthy (0-8), W Walsh (1-1), E O'Brien (1-0), T Ryan (0-3).	Attendance: 13,155; Referee: S Power (Waterford)

20 April 1969 Semi-final	Wexford	2-5 - 1-6	Limerick	Croke Park, Dublin
	J Berry (1-1), T Doran (1-0), P Lynch (0-2), M Butler (0-1), D Quigley (0-1).		É Cregan (1-5), M Graham (0-1).	Attendance: 8,000; Referee: P Buggy (Kilkenny)

Final

4 May 1969 Final	Cork	3-12 - 1-14	Wexford	Croke Park, Dublin
15:30	W Walsh (2-1), C Cullinane (1-2), C McCarthy (0-2), E O'Brien (0-2), C Roche (0-2), T Ryan (0-2), J McCarthy (0-1).		P Lynch (1-4), P Wilson (0-3), N Buggy (0-3), T Doran (0-2), C Jacob (0-1), M Jacob (0-1).	Attendance: 31,963; Referee: J Fitzgerald (Limerick)

=== Scoring statistics ===
Top scorers overall

Rank	Player	Team	Tally	Total	Matches	Average
1	Paul Lynch	Wexford	8-24	48	6	8.00
2	Éamonn Cregan	Limerick	4-25	37	5	7.40
3	Paddy Molloy	Offaly	7-14	35	5	7.00
4	Fran Whelan	Dublin	6-15	33	4	8.25
4	Jimmy Doyle	Tipperary	2-27	33	5	6.60
6	Tom Walsh	Waterford	6-11	29	3	9.66
6	Eddie Keher	Kilkenny	5-14	29	5	5.80
8	Charlie Cullinane	Cork	7-04	25	6	4.16
9	Tom Ryan	Clare	6-03	21	4	5.25
10	Charlie McCarthy	Cork	1-16	19	5	3.75

Top scorers in a single game

Rank	Player	Team	Tally	Total	Opposition
1	Paul Lynch	Wexford	4-02	14	Laois
1	Fran Whelan	Dublin	3-05	14	Cork
1	Tom Walsh	Waterford	3-05	14	Kilkenny
4	Tom Walsh	Waterford	3-03	12	Laois
5	Paul Lynch	Wexford	2-05	11	Waterford
6	Martin Brennan	Kilkenny	3-01	10	Offaly
6	Tom Ryan	Clare	3-01	10	Galway
6	Bernie Meade	Cork	2-4	10	Dublin
6	Jimmy Doyle	Tipperary	0-10	10	Wexford
10	Charlie Cullinane	Cork	3-00	9	Galway
10	Jim Doran	Dublin	2-03	9	Limerick
10	Phil Wilson	Wexford	2-03	9	Waterford
10	Eddie Keher	Kilkenny	2-03	9	Tipperary
10	Paddy Molloy	Offaly	2-03	9	Kilkenny
10	Jimmy Doyle	Tipperary	1-06	9	Offaly
10	Éamonn Cregan	Limerick	0-09	9	Dublin

== Division 2 ==
=== Results ===
==== Knock-out stage ====
20 April 1969 Semi-final	Westmeath	4-13 - 5-7	Kerry	Pearse Stadium, Galway
	O Egan (1-4), M Fagan (1-1), E O'Donnell (1-0), L Maher (1-0), C Connaughton (0-3), J Rooney (0-2), M Flanagan (0-2), J Keary (0-1).		W Maguire (2-3), M Hennessy (2-1), P McCarthy (1-0), E O'Sullivan (0-2), T Kenny (0-1).

27 April 1969 Semi-final	Kildare	3-10 - 1-3	Down	Croke Park, Dublin
	S Cummins (2-0), T Carew (1-2), M Dwane (0-3), N Behan (0-2), R Burke (0-2), J Connell (0-1).		H Dorrian (1-0), C McMullan (0-2), C Crawford (0-1).	Referee: C Foley Dublin)

18 May 1969 Final	Kildare	4-13 - 1-5	Westmeath	Croke Park, Dublin
	M Dwane (2-5), T Carew (2-3), N Behan (0-2), T Christian (0-2), R Burke (0-1).		K Gavin (1-0), O Egan (0-2), P Jackson (0-1), C Connaughton (0-1), L Maher (0-1).	Referee: C Foley (Dublin)
