= 1966 Cork Intermediate Hurling Championship =

Irish hurling competition

- Dates: 3 April – 11 September 1966
- Teams: 18
- Champions: Cloyne (1st title); Donal Clifford (captain)
- Runners-up: Cobh

Tournament statistics
- Matches played: 16
- Goals scored: 118 (7.38 per match)
- Points scored: 213 (13.31 per match)

The 1966 Cork Intermediate Hurling Championship was the 57th staging of the Cork Intermediate Hurling Championship since its establishment by the Cork County Board in 1909. The draw for the first round fixtures took place on 30 January 1966. The championship ran from 3 April to 11 September 1966.

The final was played on 11 September 1966 at Clonmult Memorial Park in Midleton, between Cloyne and Cobh, in what was their first ever meeting in the final. Cloyne won the match by 4–14 to 3–06 to claim their first ever championship title.

== Results ==
=== First round ===
10 April 1966 First round	Bandon	2-04 - 6-02	Tracton	Kinsale Grounds

25 May 1966 First round	Éire Óg	0-06 - 6-09	Glen Rovers	The Mardyke
	C Sheehan 0-2, T Brady 0-2, H Aherne 0-1, M Murphy 0-1.		JJ Kelly 3-0, P Harte 1-2, D O'Driscoll 1-2, P Murphy 0-4, T McEvoy 1-0, D Lynch 0-1.

=== Second round ===
3 April 1966 Second round	Youghal	w/o - scr.	Castlemartyr	Clonmult Memorial Park

10 April 1966 Second round	Carrigaline	4-07 - 3-04	Nemo Rangers	Douglas Grounds
	J Foster 1-3, B Cogan 1-1, P Farrell 1-1, T O'Mahony 1-0, C Cooney 0-2.		R Sisk 3-1, S McCarthy 0-2, P Harrington 0-1.

10 April 1966 Second round	Shamrocks	3-05 - 5-03	Ballincollig	Douglas Grounds
	R Sisk 1-1, N Sisk 1-0, N Hanley 1-0, J Flynn 0-2, P O'Driscoll 0-1, N O'Mahony 0-1.		T Murphy 1-2, J Holmes 1-1, T Dwyer 1-0, B Fitton 1-0, G O'Regan 1-0.

8 May 1966 Second round	Ballymartle	8-07 - 2-04	Sarsfields	Cork Athletic Grounds
	D Lordan 3-0, P O'Donovan 2-1, O Hurley 1-4, B Coleman 1-0, S Nyhan 0-2.		P Ryan 1-0, J Shanahan 1-0, R Doyle 0-1, L Higgins 0-2, J Hurley 0-1.

15 May 1966 Second round	Cloyne	4-08 - 5-02	Ballinhassig	Cork Athletic Grounds
	P Ring 1-6, D Daly 2-0, S Daly 1-0, D Motherway 0-1, M Ahern 0-1.		Derry Coleman 3-0, Donie Coleman 1-1, J Murphy 1-0, J Holland 0-1.

18 May 1966 Second round	Castletownroche	2-08 - 2-07	Midleton	Riverstown Sportsfield

5 June 1966 Second round	Cobh	3-12 - 3-10	Mallow	Cork Athletic Grounds
	T Meaney 1-6, J O'Connor 1-0, D O'Brien 1-0, M Meaney 0-3, S O'Connor 0-1, J Clifford 0-1, P Leahy 0-1.		L Sheehan 1-6, J Lenihan 1-0, M O'Donovan 1-0, K Sheehan 0-2, P Carey 0-1, S McAuliffe 0-1

26 June 1966 Second round	Glen Rovers	4-07 - 3-02	Tracton	Carrigaline Grounds

=== Quarter-finals ===
19 June 1966 Quarter-final	Cloyne	3-10 - 2-04	Ballymartle	Cork Athletic Grounds
	J Ahern 2-0, D Daly 1-1, P Ring 0-4, D Clifford 0-2, N Foley 0-1, D Motherway 0-1, M O'Brien 0-1.		O Hurley 1-2, B Coleman 1-0, P Donovan 0-1, D Lordan 0-1.

26 June 1966 Quarter-final	Ballincollig	4-06 - 3-08	Castletownroche	Cork Athletic Grounds
	T O'Dwyer 2-0, T Murphy 1-3, D Fitton 1-1, J Barry-Murphy 0-1, B Murphy 0-1.		R Browne 3-2, W Walsh 0-3, C O'Flynn 0-1, R O'Sullivan 0-1, M Farrell 0-1.

3 July 1966 Quarter-final	Cobh	6-12 - 7-01	Carrigaline	Manning Park

31 July 1966 Quarter-final	Youghal	4-09 - 0-04	Glen Rovers	Clonmult Memorial Park
	M Holland 2-1, F Cooper 2-0, G Walsh 0-3, S Delacour 0-3, P Hegarty 0-2.		M Kenneally 0-2, JJ Kelly 0-2.

=== Semi-finals ===
31 July 1966 Semi-final	Cloyne	8-02 - 3-07	Ballincollig	Cork Athletic Grounds
	J Aherne 4-0, D Daly 2-0, D Clifford 1-1, M Aherne 1-1.		T Murphy 1-3, D Nangle 1-1, T O'Dwyer 1-0, D Fitton 0-2, W Fitton 0-1.

21 August 1966 Semi-final	Cobh	3-12 - 3-11	Youghal	Clonmult Memorial Park
	T Meaney 0-6, L McGrath 1-1, K Ryan 1-1, J O'Connell 1-0, J Clifford 0-3, M Meaney 0-1.		P Hegarty 0-7, M Holland 1-1, W Walsh 1-0, F Cooper 1-0, S Delacour 0-2, G Walsh 0-1.

=== Final ===
11 September 1966 Final	Cloyne	4-14 - 3-06	Cobh	Clonmult Memorial Park
	P Ring 0-8, J Daly 2-1, M O'Brien 1-2, D Daly 1-0, D Clifford 0-3.		J O'Brien 2-1, L McGrath 1-1, J Ryan 0-2, M Meaney 0-1, T Meaney 0-1.	Referee: M Walsh (Mayfield)
