= 1966 All-Ireland Minor Hurling Championship =

All-Ireland Minor Hurling Championship 1966
Championship Details
- Dates: 3 April 1966 – 16 October 1966

All Ireland Champions
- Winners: Wexford (2nd win)
- Captain: Pat Bernie

All Ireland Runners-up
- Runners-up: Cork

Provincial Champions
- Munster: Cork
- Leinster: Wexford
- Ulster: Antrim
- Connacht: Roscommon

The 1966 All-Ireland Minor Hurling Championship was the 36th staging of the All-Ireland Minor Hurling Championship since its establishment by the Gaelic Athletic Association in 1928.

Dublin entered the championship as the defending champions, however, they were beaten in the Leinster semi-final.

On 16 October 1966 Wexford won the championship following a 4-1 to 1-8 defeat of Cork in a replay of the All-Ireland final. This was their second All-Ireland title and their first in three championship seasons.

== Results ==
=== Leinster Minor Hurling Championship ===
Preliminary round

3 April 1966 Preliminary round	Kildare	4-12 - 2-5	Meath	Páic Naomh Mhuire, Maynooth

First round

24 April 1966 First round	Louth	1-4 - 11-7	Wicklow	Drogheda Park, Drogheda

8 May 1966 First round	Westmeath	4-3 - 0-3	Offaly	Páirc Tailteann, Navan

15 May 1966 First round	Carlow	1-5 - 6-10	Laois	Dr. Cullen Park, Carlow

Quarter-finals

22 May 1966 Quarter-final	Laois	9-8 - 2-0	Westmeath	O'Moore Park, Portlaoise

29 May 1966 Quarter-final	Wicklow	2-2 - 5-19	Kilkenny	Ashford Sportsfield, Ashford

Semi-finals

3 July 1966 Semi-final	Wexford	7-8 - 3-13	Dublin	Dr. Cullen Park, Carlow

3 July 1966 Semi-final	Laois	3-17 - 5-10	Kilkenny	St. Brendan's Park, Birr

Final

17 July 1966 Final	Wexford	7-6 - 1-7	Laois	Croke Park, Dublin

=== Munster Minor Hurling Championship ===
Quarter-finals

8 May 1966 Quarter-final	Cork	3-06 - 0-05	Clare	Gaelic Grounds, Limerick
	P Keane 2-3, L Comer 1-1, B Meade 0-2.		T McAllister 0-3, G Horan 0-1, O Donnellan 0-1.

8 May 1966 Quarter-final	Galway	7-06 - 7-06	Waterford	Gaelic Grounds, Limerick
	E Farrell 3-0, J Connolly 2-1, J Burke 2-1, M Bond 0-4.		P O'Grady 2-2, N Kelly 2-1, B Scanlan 2-0, J Greene 1-0, J Fleming 0-2, M Power 0-1.	Referee: M Walsh (Cork)

15 May 1966 Quarter-final	Tipperary	3-11 - 1-03	Limerick	Páirc Mac Gearailt, Fermoy
	T Delaney 1-3, L O'Shea 1-2, P McDermott 0-4, M Ryan 1-0, T O'Connor 0-2.		M Grace 1-1, P Hartigan 0-1, S Burke 0-1.	Referee: F Murphy (Cork)

3 July 1966 Quarter-final replay	Galway	2-12 - 4-05	Waterford	Gaelic Grounds, Limerick

Semi-finals

10 July 1966 Semi-final	Galway	5-05 - 3-06	Tipperary	Dunlo GAA Grounds, Ballinasloe
				Referee: M Hayes (Clare)

10 July 1966 Semi-final	Kerry	0-05 - 13-08	Cork	Fitzgerald Stadium, Killarney

Final

24 July 1966 Final	Cork	6-07 - 2-08	Galway	Gaelic Grounds, Limerick
	F Keane 2-1, L Comer 2-0, B Meade 1-2, P Moylan 1-0, W Walsh 0-2, L Comer 0-1, S Murphy 0-1.

=== Ulster Minor Hurling Championship ===
Semi-finals

29 May 1966 Semi-final	Donegal	2-7 - 5-5	Tyrone	MacCumhaill Park, Ballybofey

29 May 1966 Semi-final	Antrim	6-6 - 1-2	Down	Casement Park, Belfast

Final

17 July 1966 Final	Tyrone	1-3 - 6-6	Antrim	O'Neill Park, Dungannon

=== All-Ireland Minor Hurling Championship ===
Semi-finals

14 August 1966 Semi-final	Cork	9-11 - 1-06	Antrim	Athletic Grounds, Cork
	B Meade 3-2, F Keane 3-0, C Kelly 0-7, D Clifford 1-1, L Comer 1-1, M Curley 1-0.		E McCallin 1-1, K Carson 0-3, D McGrogan and A McCallin 0-1 each.	Attendance: 5,000

14 August 1966 Semi-final	Roscommon	0-03 - 10-12	Wexford	Dr. Hyde Park, Roscommon
	C Doolan 0-1, J Kane 0-1, D Coyle 0-1.		N Browne 2-2, L Bent 2-1, T Furlong 1-3, P Bernie 1-3, T Rice 1-2, D Howell 1-0, M Butler 1-0, P Byrne 1-0, J Ryan 0-1.

Finals

4 September 1966 Final	Wexford	6-07 - 6-07	Cork	Croke Park, Dublin
	T Furlong 2-1, P Bernie 2-1, M Browen 2-0, P Byrne 0-2, T Royce 0-2, D Howell 0-1.		B Meade 2-6, L Comer 2-0, C Kelly 0-1, F Keane 1-0, D Clifford 0-1.	Referee: T Foran (Tipperary)

16 October 1966 Final replay	Wexford	4-01 - 1-08	Cork	Croke Park, Dublin
	T Price 2-0, E Bent 1-0, P Kavanagh 1-0, T Furlong 0-1.		B Meade 1-4, P Ring 0-3, M Curley 0-1.	Referee: J Hatton (Wicklow)
