= Denis Coughlan =

Irish Gaelic footballer and hurler (1945–2026)

Personal information
- Native name: Donnacha Ó Cochlainn (Irish)
- Born: 7 June 1945 Blackpool, Cork, Ireland
- Died: 5 June 2026 (aged 80)
- Occupation: Company director
- Height: 6 ft 1 in (185 cm)

Sport
- Football Position: Midfield
- Hurling Position: Left wing-back
Clubs
- Years: Club
- 1964-1981: Glen Rovers; St. Nicholas'
Club titles
	Football	Hurling
Cork titles	2	5
Munster titles	1	3
All-Ireland titles	0	2
Inter-county
Years	County	Apps (scores)
1965-1974 1968-1980	Cork (SF); Cork (SH)	22 (7-47); 31 (0-10)
Inter-county titles
	Football	Hurling
Munster Titles	4	7
All-Ireland Titles	1	4
League titles	0	3
All-Stars	0	3

Denis Coughlan (7 June 1945 – 5 June 2026) was an Irish hurler, Gaelic footballer and manager who played for Cork Senior Championship clubs Glen Rovers and St. Nicholas'. As a dual player he played for the Cork senior teams for 15 years, during which time he played as a back, a midfielder and a forward. Coughlan is regarded as one of Cork's greatest-ever dual players.

Coughlan began his career at club level as a hurler with Glen Rovers and as a Gaelic footballer with St. Nicholas'. His club career spanned three decades from the 1960s until the 1980s, the highlight of which was winning All-Ireland Club Championship medals with Glen Rovers in 1973 as captain and again in 1977. Coughlan also won a combined total of four Munster Club Championship medals and seven Cork County Championship medals across both codes.

At inter-county level, Coughlan was part of the successful Cork junior football team that won the All-Ireland Championship in 1964 before later winning the All-Ireland Championship with the Cork under-21 hurling team in 1966. He joined the Cork senior football team in 1965 before linking up with the Cork senior hurling team in 1968. From his debut, Coughlan was ever-present as a midfielder or left wing-back and made a combined total of 53 Championship appearances across both codes in a career that ended with his last game for the Cork hurling team in 1980. During that time he was part of five All-Ireland Championship-winning teams – four as a hurler and one as a Gaelic footballer. Coughlan also secured a combined total of 10 Munster Championship medals and three National Hurling League medals.

He won his first All-Star in 1972, before claiming a further three All-Stars in 1976, 1977 and 1978. He was also selected as the Texaco Hurler of the Year in 1977. At inter-provincial level, Coughlan was selected to play in several championship campaigns with Munster as dual player, with Railway Cup wins in 1972 as a Gaelic football and 1978 as a hurler.

In retirement from playing Coughlan became involved in team management and coaching at club and inter-county levels in both hurling and Gaelic football. After guiding St. Catherine's to the Cork Junior Championship in 1983, he later had two unsuccessful seasons as coach of the Cork senior football team. Coughlan also enjoyed Munster Championship victories as coach of the Cork minor and under-21 hurling teams.

== Early life ==
Coughlan was born and raised at Madden's Buildings in Blackpool, Cork. He was educated at the North Monastery and played hurling at all levels during his time there. Coughlan was a Dean Ryan Cup runner-up in 1960, before later lining out in the Dr Harty Cup.

== Club career ==
Coughlan first played hurling with Cuchullains in the juvenile section of Glen Rovers.

On 14 November 1965, Coughlan lined out at midfield in his first final of the Cork Senior Football Championship, with St. Finbarr's providing the opposition. He ended the game with his first winners' medal after a 2–04 to 0–06 victory.

Coughlan was again selected at midfield when St. Nicholas' and St. Finbarr's clashed in a second successive final on 4 December 1966. Described in the Cork Examiner as "the most stylish footballer on the field", he ended the game with a second championship medal after the 1–07 to 1–06 victory. On 19 July 1967, Coughlan claimed a Munster Club Championship medal from midfield following St. Nicholas' 2–04 to 1–06 defeat of John Mitchels in the final.

On 26 October 1969, Coughlan lined in a third final with University College Cork providing the opposition. After starting at right wing-back, he was switched to right wing-forward in an effort to increase the scoring threat, however, Coughlan ended the game on the losing side after a 0–09 to 0–08 defeat.

Coughlan was still just 18-years-old when he was added to the Glen Rovers senior hurling team in advance of the 1964 Championship. On 11 October 1964, he was a member of the extended panel when Glen Rovers claimed the championship after a 3–12 to 2–07 defeat of St. Finbarr's in the final. By the time the Munster Club Championship was completed nearly 18 months later, Coughlan had broken onto the starting fifteen. He claimed a Munster Club Championship medal on 10 April 1966 after lining out at midfield in the Glen's 3–07 to 1–07 defeat of Mount Sion in the final.

On 8 October 1967, Coughlan was selected at centre-back when Glen Rovers faced St. Finbarr's in the 1967 final. He was instrumental in bolstering the labouring Glen midfield in the second half and claimed a second winners' medal – his first on the field of play – following the 3–09 to 1–09 victory.

Coughlan was selected at midfield when Glen Rovers qualified to meet University College Cork in the 1969 final on 21 September 1969. He ended the game with a third winners' medal after the 4–16 to 1–13 victory. On 11 April 1971, Coughlan again lined out at midfield when Glen Rovers faced Roscrea in the delayed Munster Club Championship final. He ended the game on the losing side after a 3–06 to 1–09 defeat.

After an absence of three years, Glen Rovers qualified for the final once again on 12 November 1972, with Coughlan lining out at midfield. He ended the game with a third winners' medal after the 3–15 to 1–10 victory over first-time finalists Youghal. On 22 April 1973, Coughlan claimed a second Munster Club Championship medal after scoring two points from play in the 2–09 to 1–10 defeat of Roscrea in the final. On 9 December 1973, he captained Glen Rovers in the delayed All-Ireland final against St. Rynagh's and collected an All-Ireland Club Championship medal following the 2–18 to 2–08 victory.

On 14 October 1973, Coughlan captained Glen Rovers from right wing-back when they faced Blackrock in the 1973 final. He ended the game on the losing side for the first time in his career after the Glen suffered a 2–12 to 2–10 defeat.

On 14 September 1975, Coughlan lined out at centre-back when Glen Rovers played Blackrock in a second final in three years. The 4–11 to 0–10 scoreline resulted in a defeat for Glen Rovers.

Glen Rovers faced Blackrock in a third final in four years on 3 October 1976, with Coughlan being selected at left wing-back. He claimed a fourth winners' medal following the 2–07 to 0–10 victory. On 19 December 1976, Coughlan collected a third Munster Club Championship medal after scoring two points from play in the 2–08 to 2–04 defeat of South Liberties in the Munster final. On 27 March 1977, he was again selected at left wing-back when Glen Rovers faced Camross in the All-Ireland final. Coughlan collected a second All-Ireland Club Championship winners' medal after the 2–12 to 0–08 victory.

On 18 September 1977, Glen Rovers faced St. Finbarr's in front of a record crowd of 34,151 in the 1977 final. Lining out at left wing-back, Coughlan ended the game on the losing side after the Glen suffered a 1–17 to 1–05 defeat,

Glen Rovers qualified for a fourth successive final on 22 October 1978, with Blackrock providing the opposition. Coughlan once again lined out at left wing-back but lost his second successive final after a 4–12 to 1–07 defeat.

Coughlan was appointed the Glen Rovers captain for the 1980 Championship. On 12 October 1980, he led the team from left wing-back to an appearance in the final against St. Finbarr's. Coughlan ended the game on the losing side after a 1–09 to 2–04 defeat.

On 13 September 1981, Coughlan lined out in his 10th final, with reigning champions St. Finbarr's providing the opposition for a second successive year. In what was his last major game for the club, Coughlan ended on the losing side for the sixth time in his career after the 1–12 to 1–09 defeat.

== Inter-county career ==
Coughlan first played for Cork as a member of the minor football team during the 1963 Munster Championship. He made his first appearance for the team on 14 July 1963 when he was selected at left corner-back in Cork's 0-08 apiece draw with Kerry in the Munster final. Coughlan retained his position on the starting fifteen for the replay on 26 July 1963 but ended the game on the losing side after the 0–11 to 0–04 defeat.

He was just out of the minor grade when he was a late addition to the Cork under-21 football panel for the delayed 1963 Munster final against Kerry on 22 March 1964. Lining out at centre-back, he ended the game with a Munster Under-21 Championship medal following the 2–03 to 1–04 victory.

On 8 August 1965, Coughlan claimed a second Munster Under-21 Championship medal after lining out at midfield in the 2–14 to 1–06 defeat of Tipperary in the Munster final. On 3 October 1965, he was again selected at midfield when Cork faced Kildare in the All-Ireland final. Coughlan scored a point from play but ended the game on the losing side following a 2–11 to 1–07 defeat.

On 18 August 1966, Coughlan was named at centre-back when Cork faced Kerry in the Munster final. In what his last game for the Cork under-21 football team, he ended the game on the losing side after a 3–08 to 0–14 defeat. By this stage Coughlan had become a dual player when he was also selected for the Cork under-21 hurling team. He won a Munster Under-21 Championship medal in that code on 8 September 1966 when he lined out at right wing-back in a 5–12 to 2–06 defeat of Limerick in the Munster final. Coughlan retained his position on the starting fifteen for the 3–12 to 5-06 All-Ireland final draw with Wexford on 2 October 1966. He was again selected at right wing-back for the replay on 23 October 1966, however, the game once again ended in a 4-09 apiece draw. Coughlan was switched to left wing-back for the second replay on 13 November 1966 and claimed an All-Ireland Under-21 Championship medal at the third attempt following a 9–09 to 5–09 victory.

On 20 June 1965, Coughlan had just turned 20 when he made his Munster Championship debut for the Cork senior football team. He lined out at left corner-back in a 2–06 to 0–06 defeat by Limerick in the Munster semi-final.

Coughlan was dropped from the Cork senior football team for the 1966 Munster Championship, but returned as captain of the team the following year while he was also a substitute with the Cork senior hurling team. On 16 July 1967, he won his first Munster Championship medal after captaining the team from centre-back in an 0–08 to 0–07 defeat of Kerry in the final. On 24 September 1967, Coughlan captained Cork to an All-Ireland final appearance against Meath. He ended the game on the losing side following a 1–09 to 0–9 defeat.

On 14 July 1968, Coughlan lined out at centre-back in a second successive Munster final against Kerry. He ended the game on the losing side as Cork surrendered their title following a 1–21 to 3–08 defeat by Kerry. A week later on 21 July 1968, Coughlan lined out at midfield when the Cork senior hurling team faced Tipperary in the Munster final. For the second week in succession he ended the Munster final on the losing side as the hurlers suffered a 2–13 to 1–07 defeat.

He continued with his dual player status for the 1969 season, and won a National Hurling League medal as a non-playing substitute on 4 May 1969 after a 3–12 to 1–14 defeat of Wexford in the final. Coughlan lined out in a third successive Munster final with the Cork senior football team on 20 July 1969. Playing in his customary position of centre-back, he ended the game on the losing side after the 1–14 to 0–16 defeat by Kerry. A week later on 27 July 1969, Coughlan was selected at midfield when the Cork senior hurling team faced Tipperary in a second successive Munster final. He scored two points from play and claimed his first Munster Championship medal in that code following the 4–06 to 0–09 victory. On 7 September 1969, Coughlan was again selected at midfield when Cork suffered a 2–15 to 2–09 defeat by Kilkenny in the All-Ireland final.

On 26 July 1970, Coughlan was selected at left corner-forward when Cork faced Kerry in the Munster final. He top-scored for Cork with 2-04 from play but ended the game on the losing side following the 2–22 to 2–09 defeat. After missing the Cork senior hurling team's Munster Championship campaign, Coughlan was recalled to the starting fifteen at midfield on 16 August 1970 for the 4–20 to 2-09 All-Ireland semi-final defeat of Antrim. On 6 September 1970, he was relegated to the substitutes' bench for the All-Ireland final against Wexford. Coughlan remained on the bench for the entire game but claimed an All-Ireland medal after the 6–20 to 5–10 victory in the first-ever 80-minute decider.

Coughlan committed solely to the Cork senior football team for the 1971 Munster Championship. He won a second Munster Championship medal on 18 July 1971 after scoring 0-10 after coming on as a substitute in Cork's 0–25 to 0–14 defeat of Kerry in the final.

On 7 May 1972, Coughlan won a second National Hurling League medal – his first on the field of play – after Cork's 3–14 to 2–14 defeat of Limerick in the final. On 16 July 1972, he lined out at midfield when Cork faced Kerry in the Munster final once again. He scored 1-01 from play but ended the game on the losing side as the Cork senior footballers surrendered their title after a 2–21 to 2–15 defeat. Two weeks later on 30 July 1972, Coughlan lined out at midfield when the Cork senior hurling team qualified to play Clare in the Munster final. He scored a point from play and claimed a second winners' medal following the 6–18 to 2–08 victory. After missing the All-Ireland semi-final, Coughlan was restored to the starting fifteen for the All-Ireland final against Kilkenny on 3 September 1972. Trailing by eight points with 13 minutes left to play, Kilkenny staged a remarkable comeback to win the game by 3–24 to 5–11. In spite of the defeat, Coughlan ended the season by being named at midfield on the All-Star Team "for his hard work and devotion to the game and his county and for his dexterity and elegance in his play."

He was appointed captain of the Cork senior hurling team for the 1973 Munster Championship, however, his tenure was short-lived as Cork suffered an opening-round defeat by Tipperary. As a member of the Cork senior football team also that season, he lined out at centre-forward when Cork faced Kerry in the Munster final on 15 July 1973. Coughlan was held scoreless throughout but ended the game with a third Munster Championship medal following the 5–12 to 1–15 victory. He retained his position on the starting fifteen for the All-Ireland final against Galway on 23 September 1973, however, Coughlan was switched from the half-forward line to midfield. He scored a point from play and ended the game with an All-Ireland medal as Cork claimed the title for the first time since 1945 after a 3–17 to 2–13 victory.

On 5 May 1974, Coughlan won a second National Hurling League medal after lining out at midfield in the 6–15 to 1–12 defeat of Wexford in the final. The team later made an early exit from the 1974 Munster Championship, with Coughlan's retirement from inter-county hurling and his proposed retirement from inter-county football being reported in the Evening Echo on 27 May 1974. The lack of hurling action allowed Coughlan to commit solely to the Cork senior football team as captain for the second time in his career. On 14 July 1974, he captained the team from midfield when Cork faced Kerry in the Munster final. Coughlan ended the game with a fourth winners' medal after the 1–11 to 0–07 victory, while he also had the honour of collecting the cup for a second time as captain.

After having no involvement at inter-county level during the respective 1975 Championships, Coughlan was recalled to the Cork senior hurling team in advance of the 1975–76 National Hurling League and was retained for the 1976 Munster Championship. On 1 August 1976, he won a third Munster Championship medal after lining out at left wing-back in Cork's 3–15 to 4–05 defeat of Limerick in the final. On 5 September 1976, Coughlan was again selected at left wing-back when Cork faced Wexford in the All-Ireland final. After being eight points down after just six minutes, Cork secured a 2–21 to 4–11 victory with Coughlan claiming his second All-Ireland medal and his first on the field of play. He ended the season by being named in the left wing-back position on the All-Star Team.

On 19 June 1977, Coughlan captained the Cork senior hurling team for the second time in his championship career due to the absence of the named captain Martin O'Doherty for the 4–13 to 3–11 defeat of Waterford. He claimed a fourth Munster Championship medal on 10 July 1977 following Cork's 4–15 to 4–10 defeat of Clare in the final. On 4 September 1977, Coughlan lined out at left wing-back when Cork qualified to play Wexford in a second successive All-Ireland final. He ended the game with a third winners' medal after the 1–17 to 3–08 victory. Coughlan ended the season by once again being named on the All-Star Team while he was also selected as the Texaco Hurler of the Year.

Coughlan lined out at left wing-back in a third successive Munster final on 30 July 1978. He ended the game with a fifth winners' medal after the 0–13 to 0–11 defeat of Clare for the second year in-a-row. On 3 September 1978, Coughlan was selected at left wing-back for his third successive All-Ireland final appearance. He ended the game on the winning side after the 1–15 to 2–08 defeat of Kilkenny and claimed a third successive winners' medal. Coughlan was once again named at left wing-back on the All-Star Team.

On 8 July 1979, Coughlan lined out at left wing-back in his sixth Munster final appearance. He preserved his 100% record of victories and claimed a sixth winners' medal after the 2–14 to 0–09 victory over Limerick.

While a number of his teammates retired, Coughlan, who was approaching 35, once again committed to Cork for the 1979–80 season. On 4 May 1980, he was at right wing-back when Cork drew 2-10 apiece with Limerick in the National League final. Coughlan retained his position on the starting fifteen for the replay two weeks later and claimed a third National Hurling League medal after the 4–15 to 4–06 victory. On 20 July 1980, Coughlan was again selected at right wing-back when Cork and Limerick renewed their rivalry in the Munster final. In what was his last game for Cork, he ended on the losing side after the 2–14 to 2–10 defeat.

== Inter-provincial career ==
Coughlan was first selected for the Munster inter-provincial football team in advance of the 1968 Railway Cup. He made his first appearance for the team on 25 February 1968 when he lined out at centre-back in the 0–11 to 0–05 defeat by Leinster.

After a four-year absence, Coughlan was recalled to the Munster football team for the 1972 Railway Cup. On 17 March 1972, he lined out at centre-forward for the 1-15 apiece draw with Leinster in the final. Coughlan retained his position on the starting fifteen for the replay on 23 April 1972 and ended the game with a winners' medal after the 2–14 to 0–10 victory.

He became a dual player at inter-provincial level when he was also added to the Munster hurling team for the 1973 Railway Cup. After making his first appearance for the team in the semi-final defeat of Connacht, he was at midfield on 17 March 1973 when Munster suffered a 1–13 to 2–08 defeat by Leinster in the final.

On 17 March 1977, Coughlan was selected at left wing-back when Munster qualified to play Leinster in the Railway Cup final. He ended the game on the losing side after a 2–17 to 1–13 defeat.

Coughlan was again included on the Munster hurling selection for the 1978 Railway Cup. He was selected in his customary position of left wing-back when Munster qualified to play Leinster in the final on 7 May 1978 at Páirc Uí Chaoimh. Coughlan ended the game with a second Railway Cup medal – his first as a member of the hurling team.

He earned his fourth call-up to the Munster hurling team in advance of the 1979 Railway Cup. He played his last game for the province on 11 March 1979 when Munster suffered a 4–09 to 2–07 defeat by Connacht at the semi-final stage.

== Management career ==
=== St. Catherine's ===
Coughlan first became involved in club management when he was appointed trainer of the St. Catherine's junior hurling team at the start of the 1983 season. On 28 August 1983, he saw the team capture the East Cork Championship after a 4–14 to 3–07 defeat of Midleton in the final. On 6 November 1983, St. Catherine's qualified for the final of the Cork Junior Championship where they faced Aghabullogue. Coughlan's side secured the title after a 1–13 to 1–09 victory.

=== Cork ===
On 16 October 1984, Coughlan was elected to the position of selector with the Cork senior football team before later assuming the position of coach. Cork's National Football League campaign ended with the team finishing bottom of Division 1 and being relegated to Division 2 for the following season. On 1 May 1985, Coughlan's side suffered a 2–11 to 0–04 defeat by Kerry in the final of the 1985 Ford Open Draw Cup. Both sides renewed their rivalry in the Munster final on 21 July 1985, with Cork losing out by 2–11 to 0–11.

On 6 July 1986, Coughlan coached Cork to a second successive Munster final appearance against Kerry. Cork were once again defeated on a 0–12 to 0–08 scoreline. Coughlan stepped aside as coach shortly after this defeat.

=== Glen Rovers ===
In October 1986, Coughlan was appointed coach of the Glen Rovers senior hurling team. His one season in charge saw Glen Rovers reach the semi-finals of the 1987 Championship where they suffered a 0–12 to 0–08 defeat by Na Piarsaigh.

=== Cork ===
On 11 July 1989, Coughlan was ratified as coach of the Cork minor hurling team. On 15 July 1990, he guided the team to the Munster Championship title after a 1–09 to 0–09 defeat of Clare in the final. On 2 September 1990, Cork drew 3-14 apiece with Kilkenny in the All-Ireland final. The replay four weeks later saw Coughlan's side suffer a 3–16 to 0–11 defeat.

Coughlan took over as manager of the Cork under-21 hurling team in advance of the 1991 Munster Championship. On 7 August 1991, he guided Cork to the Munster Championship title after a 0–17 to 1–07 defeat of Limerick in the final.

== Death ==
Coughlan died on 5 June 2026, at the age of 80.

== Honours ==
=== Player ===
St Nicholas'

- Munster Senior Club Football Championship (1): 1966
- Cork Senior Football Championship (2): 1965, 1966

Glen Rovers

- All-Ireland Senior Club Hurling Championship (2): 1973 (c), 1977
- Munster Senior Club Hurling Championship (3): 1964, 1972 (c), 1976
- Cork Senior Hurling Championship (5): 1964, 1967, 1969, 1972, 1976

Cork

- All-Ireland Senior Football Championship (1): 1973
- All-Ireland Senior Hurling Championship (4): 1970, 1976, 1977, 1978
- Munster Senior Football Championship (4): 1967 (c), 1971, 1973, 1974 (c)
- Munster Senior Hurling Championship (7): 1969, 1970, 1972, 1976, 1977, 1978, 1979
- All-Ireland Junior Football Championship (1): 1964
- Munster Junior Football Championship (1): 1964
- All-Ireland Under-21 Hurling Championship (1): 1966
- Munster Under-21 Hurling Championship (1): 1966
- Munster Under-21 Football Championship (2): 1963, 1965

Munster

- Railway Cup (2): 1972, 1978

Awards

- Texaco Hurler of the Year (1): 1977
- All-Star Awards (4): 1972, 1976, 1977, 1978

=== Management ===
St Catherine's

- Cork Junior Hurling Championship (1): 1983

Cork

- Munster Under-21 Hurling Championship (1): 1991
- Munster Minor Hurling Championship (1): 1990

Sporting positions
Preceded by Jerry O'Sullivan	Cork senior football team captain 1967	Succeeded by Bernie O'Neill
Preceded by Frank Norberg	Cork senior hurling team captain 1973	Succeeded by John Horgan
Preceded by Billy Morgan	Cork senior football team captain 1974	Succeeded by Jimmy Barrett
Preceded by Ray Cummins	Cork senior hurling team captain 1977	Succeeded by Martin O'Doherty
Preceded by Éamonn Ryan	Cork senior football team coach 1984-1986	Succeeded by Billy Morgan
Awards
Preceded by Tony Doran	Texaco Hurler of the Year; 1977	Succeeded by John Horgan
Achievements
Preceded by John Horgan	All-Ireland Senior Club Hurling Final winning captain 1973	Succeeded by John Horgan
