= Seánie Barry =

Irish hurler

Personal information
- Native name: Seánie de Barra (Irish)
- Nickname: Seánie
- Born: 1945 (age 80–81) Rathcormac, County Cork, Ireland
- Occupation: Roman Catholic priest
- Height: 5 ft 11 in (180 cm)

Sport
- Sport: Hurling
- Position: Left wing-forward
Clubs
Years	Club	Apps (scores)
1963-1985 1965-1971 1965-1967 1968-1971	Sarsfields; Bride Rovers → UCC → Imokilly	9 (5-44); 6 (2-40)
Club titles
- Cork titles: 0
College
- Years: College
- 1964-1968: University College Cork
College titles
- Fitzgibbon titles: 2
Inter-county*
Years	County	Apps (scores)
1966-1971	Cork	12 (4-34)
Inter-county titles
- Munster titles: 2
- All-Irelands: 2
- NHL: 1
- *Inter County team apps and scores correct as of 17:02, 18 April 2015.

Seánie Barry (born 1945) is an Irish former hurler and manager. At club level he played with Sarsfields, Bride Rovers, University College Cork and Imokilly and was also a member of the Cork senior hurling team.

== Early life ==
Born and raised in Rathcormac, County Cork, Barry first played as a schoolboy in various juvenile competitions at Rathcormac National School before later lining out as a student at St Finbarr's College in Cork. He was a member of the first St Finbarr's team to win the Harty Cup in 1963 before later claiming the All-Ireland title. After beginning his clerical studies at University College Cork in 1964, Barry immediately began a four-year association with the senior hurling team. During that time he won successive Fitzgibbon Cup titles in 1966 and as team captain in 1967.

== Club career ==
Barry began his club career at minor level with Sarsfields. In his early playing days he was a goalkeeper and won two East Cork minor hurling titles in that position in 1960 and 1961 before spending his last two years in the grade as a forward. Barry spent a number of years playing junior and intermediate hurling with Sarsfields before becoming eligible to line out at senior level with University College Cork in 1965. He was on the college team that lost consecutive county finals to St. Finbarr's in 1965 and Avondhu in 1966 when he was top scorer.

Barry joined the Bride Rovers club after it was reformed in 1964 and was allowed to play on the junior team while simultaneously lining out with University College Cork. He won consecutive East Cork JAHC titles with the club in 1968 and as team captain in 1969. Barry's performances at junior level earned a call-up to the Imokilly team that was beaten by St Finbarr's in the 1968 final.

== Inter-county career ==
Barry began a two-year association with the Cork minor hurling team as sub-goalkeeper for the 1962 Munster MHC. He earned a place on the starting fifteen the following year and was at right wing-forward for a second consecutive defeat by Tipperary in the Munster MHC final. After a year away from the inter-county scene, Barry was back with the Cork under-21 and intermediate teams in 1965. He ended the season with an All-Ireland IHC title after a win over London in the final.

Success in the intermediate grade earned Barry a call-up to the Cork senior hurling team and he made his championship debut in a draw with Clare in the opening round of the 1966 Munster SHC. He ended the season with an All-Ireland medal and the honour of being championship top scorer after beating Kilkenny in the 1966 All-Ireland final. Barry was one of a number of players from the senior team who also won an All-Ireland U21HC medal after a defeat of Wexford that season.

Barry was a regular for Cork over the following two seasons, however, his studies for the priesthood resulted in him missing Cork's defeat by Kilkenny in the 1969 All-Ireland final. He returned to the panel shortly afterwards and was part of the Cork team that won the 1969-70 National League title before securing a second Munster Championship title after coming on as a substitute in the defeat of Tipperary in the final. After starting the subsequent All-Ireland semi-final defeat of Antrim at left wing-forward, Barry was an unused substitute for the 6-21 to 5-10 win over Wexford in the 1970 All-Ireland final. His ordination to the priesthood at Easter 1971 effectively brought an end to his playing career and he last lined out for Cork in a tournament game against Limerick later that same year.

== Inter-provincial career ==
Barry's performances at inter-county level resulted in his selection for Munster in their 1967 Railway Cup final defeat by Leinster. He was again included on the team the following year and collected a winners' medal after the 0-14 to 0-10 win over Leinster.

== Coaching career ==
Barry was asked by the Bride Rovers club to become involved with the junior team as coach in 1997. After defeat by Castlelyons in the East Cork JAHC final in his first year in charge, he succeeded in guiding the team to the title in 1998. It was the first time since Barry's own playing days that Bride Rovers had succeeded in winning the title. A return to his missionary work in Africa resulted in him missing the club's subsequent defeat of Freemount in the 1998 Cork JAHC final.

== Honours ==
=== Player ===
St Finbarr's College

- Dr. Croke Cup: 1963
- Dr. Harty Cup: 1963

University College Cork

- Fitzgibbon Cup: 1966, 1967 (c)

Sarsfields

- East Cork Junior Hurling Championship: 1960, 1961

Bride Rovers

- East Cork Junior A Hurling Championship: 1968, 1969 (c)
- East Cork Junior B Hurling Championship: 1966, 1975

Cork

- All-Ireland Senior Hurling Championship: 1966, 1970
- Munster Senior Hurling Championship: 1966, 1970
- National Hurling League: 1969-70
- All-Ireland Intermediate Hurling Championship: 1965
- Munster Intermediate Hurling Championship: 1965
- All-Ireland Under-21 Hurling Championship: 1966
- Munster Under-21 Hurling Championship: 1966

=== Coach ===
Bride Rovers

- Cork Junior A Hurling Championship: 1998
- East Cork Junior A Hurling Championship: 1998
