= 1966 Cork Senior Hurling Championship =

Annual hurling competition season

- Dates: 3 April 1966 – 9 October 1966
- Teams: 15
- Champions: Avondhu (2nd title); Paddy Behan (captain)
- Runners-up: University College Cork; Willie Cronin (captain)

Tournament statistics
- Matches played: 14
- Goals scored: 103 (7.36 per match)
- Points scored: 242 (17.29 per match)
- Top scorer(s): Seánie Barry (1-23)

The 1966 Cork Senior Hurling Championship was the 78th staging of the Cork Senior Hurling Championship since its establishment by the Cork County Board in 1887. The draw for the first round fixtures took place at the County Convention on 30 January 1966. The championship began on 3 April 1966 and ended on 9 October 1966.

St. Finbarr's were the defending champions, however, they were defeated by University College Cork at the semi-final stage.

On 9 October 1966, Avondhu won the championship following a 2–11 to 4–04 defeat of University College Cork in the final. This was their second championship title overall and their first in 14 championship seasons.

University College Cork's Seánie Barry was the championship's top scorer with 1-23.

== Team changes ==
=== From Championship ===
Regraded to the Cork Intermediate Hurling Championship

- Castletownroche
- Cobh

== Results ==
First round

3 April 1966 First round	Avondhu	3-10 - 4-06	Sarsfields	Clonmult Memorial Park, Midleton
	J O'Connell 2-0, R Browne 1-2, J Hogan 0-3, L Sheehan 0-3, D Fenton 0-1, N O'Regan 0-1.		D Hurley 2-2, JJ Long 1-2, P Coogan 1-1, M McDonnell 0-1.	Referee: D O'Brien (Cobh)

3 April 1966 First round	Na Piarsaigh	10-13 - 3-03	Carbery	Ballinhassig
	J Buckley 4-2, J Burke 2-1, N Greaney 2-1, M Ellard 0-5, P Allen 1-1, P Sheehan 1-1, R Tuohy 0-2, D Sheehan 0-1.		B Collins 1-2, C Corcoran 1-0, L Hurley 1-0, N Desmond 0-1.	Referee: P Cronin (St. Finbarr's)

1 May 1966 First round	St. Vincent's	2-05 - 6-13	University College Cork	Cork Athletic Grounds, Cork
	T O'Shea 1-0, D O'Regan 1-0, N Barry 0-3, J O'Shea 0-1, C O'Shea 0-1.		J McCarthy 3-2, J O'Halloran 2-2, B Kenneally 1-1, S Barry 0-4, P O'Connell 0-2, M Fahy 0-1, P Dooley 0-1.	Referee: F Murphy (Blackrock)

1 May 1966 First round	Carrigdhoun	2-08 - 7-11	Glen Rovers	Manning Park, Passage
	JK Coleman 1-3, J O'Flynn 1-2, D McCarthy 0-1, J Sheehan 0-1, D Coleman 0-1.		T Corbett 3-1, C Ring 2-3, B Carroll 1-1, J O'Sullivan 1-0, D Moore 0-2, J Young 0-2, S Kennefick 0-1, D Coughlan 0-1.	Referee: M Walsh (Mayfield)

8 May 1966 First round	Duhallow	4-03 - 3-11	Muskerry	Bishop Casey Memorial Park, Mallow
	J O'Connell 2-1, B O'Connor 1-0, S Stokes 1-0, J Twoemy 0-2.		C Sheehan 1-3, J Kelly 1-2, B Fitton 1-2, T Ryan 0-3, F Kelleher 0-1.

22 May 1966 First round	Seandún	6-04 - 5-06	Imokilly	Cork Athletic Grounds, Cork
	P Finn 2-0, A O'Sullivan 1-1, M Curley 1-0, J O'Leary 1-0, P Curley 1-0, E Dorney 0-2, P O'Connor 0-1,		T Brown 1-4, E Murphy 1-1, J Moloney 1-1, M Roche 1-0, M Meaney 1-0, P Fitzgerald 0-1.	Referee: C Conway (Blarney)

22 May 1966 First round	St. Finbarr's	5-04 - 2-01	Blackrock	Cork Athletic Grounds, Cork
	B Murphy 2-0, C McCarthy 1-1, M Leahy 1-1, C Cullinane 1-0, C Roche 0-2.		J Bennett 1-1, R Lehane 1-0.	Referee: M Walsh (Mayfield)

Quarter-finals

12 June 1966 Quarter-final	Avondhu	7-06 - 1-04	Muskerry	Priory Park, Newmarket
	N O'Regan 4-1, D O'Connell 1-2, L Sheehan 1-1, R Browne 1-0, P Behan 0-2.		T Ryan 1-2, T O'Riordan 0-1, J Long 0-1.	Referee: J Cooney (Carrigaline)

26 June 1966 Quarter-final	Passage	3-11 - 1-07	Seandún	Carrigaline
	J McCarthy 1-5, J Coughlan 1-1, J Barry 1-1, J Reilly 0-2, E O'Brien 0-1, J Murphy 0-1.		G Connell 1-0, M McCarthy 0-2, M Curley 0-2, T Furlong 0-1, M O'Leary 0-1, P Curley 0-1.	Referee: C Conway (Blarney)

26 June 1966 Quarter-final	University College Cork	3-16 - 1-15	Na Piarsaigh	Cork Athletic Grounds, Cork
	S Barry 0-8, M Fahy 2-0, J O'Halloran 1-1, B Kenneally 0-3, D Clifford 0-2, S McCarthy 0-1, W Cronin 0-1.		S Gillen 0-9, P Allen 1-1, J Buckley 0-1, F Sheehan 0-1, R Tuohy 0-1, N Greaney 0-1.	Referee: M Walsh (Mayfield)

31 July 1966 Quarter-final	St. Finbarr's	4-13 - 4-07	Glen Rovers	Cork Athletic Grounds, Cork
	M Archer 2-2, W Doyle 1-1, Gerry McCarthy 1-1, C McCarthy 0-4, C Roche 0-2, C Cullinane 0-1, P Doolan 0-1, T Connolly 0-1.		P Harte 0-4, C Ring 1-0, B Carroll 1-0, A Flynn 1-0, S Riordan 1-0, S Kennefick 0-2, T Corbett 0-1.	Referee: M Walsh (Mayfield)

Semi-finals

21 August 1966 Semi-final	Avondhu	6-12 - 3-11	Passage	Cork Athletic Grounds, Cork
	P Behan 2-1, L Sheehan 0-7, J O'Connell 1-2, R Browne 1-1, R Ennis 1-0, N O'Regan 1-0, J Browne 0-1.		J McCarthy 1-3, E O'Brien 1-1, J Barry 1-1, J O'Reilly 0-3, D Dooley 0-1, B Meade 0-1, J Coughlan 0-1.	Referee: C Conway (Blarney)

18 September 1966 Semi-final	University College Cork	2-14 - 0-13	St. Finbarr's	Cork Athletic Grounds, Cork
	S Barry 0-9, W Cronin 1-0, D Philpott 1-0, J O'Halloran 0-3, P Dooley 0-1, J McCarthy 0-1.		C McCarthy 0-6, C Cullinane 0-2, J McCarthy 0-1, M Leahy 0-1, W Doyle 0-1, P Doolan 0-1, M Archer 0-1.

Final

9 October 1966 Final	Avondhu	2-11 - 4-04	University College Cork	Cork Athletic Grounds, Cork
	L Sheehan 0-4, R Browne 1-0, R Ennis 1-0, J Keating 0-3, D O'Connell 0-1, J Russell 0-1, P Behan 0-1, F Sheedy 0-1.		S Barry 1-2, N Morgan 1-1, D Philpott 1-0, B Kenneally 1-0, W Cronin 0-1.	Referee: M Walsh

== Championship statistics ==
=== Top scorers ===
Top scorer overall

Rank	Player	Club	Tally	Total	Matches	Average
1	Seánie Barry	UCC	1-23	26	4	6.50
2	Liam Sheehan	Avondhu	1-15	18	4	4.50
3	Noel O'Regan	Avondhu	5-02	17	4	4.25
4	Jack Buckley	Na Piarsaigh	4-03	15	2	7.50
4	Richie Browne	Avondhu	4-03	15	4	3.75
4	John O'Halloran	UCC	3-06	15	4	3.75
7	Justin McCarthy	Passage	2-08	14	2	7.00
7	Charlie McCarthy	St. Finbarr's	1-11	14	3	4.66
9	Christy Ring	Glen Rovers	3-03	12	2	6.00
9	J. McCarthy	UCC	3-03	12	3	4.00

Top scorers in a single game

Rank	Player	Club	Tally	Total	Opposition
1	Jack Buckley	Na Piarsaigh	4-02	14	Carbery
2	Noel O'Regan	Avondhu	4-01	13	Muskerry
3	J. McCarthy	UCC	3-02	11	St. Vincent's
4	Tom Corbett	Glen Rovers	3-01	10	Carrigdhoun
5	Christy Ring	Glen Rovers	2-03	9	Carrigdhoun
5	Séamus Gillen	Na Piarsaigh	1-06	9	UCC
5	Seánie Barry	UCC	0-09	9	St. Finbarr's
8	Denis Hurley	Sarsfields	2-02	8	Avondhu
8	John O'Halloran	UCC	2-02	8	St. Vincent's
8	Mick Archer	St. Finbarr's	2-02	8	Glen Rovers
8	Justin McCarthy	Passage	1-05	8	Seandún
8	Seánie Barry	UCC	0-08	8	Na Piarsaigh

=== Miscellaneous ===
- Avondhu win the title for the first time since 1952
