= 1966 All-Ireland Under-21 Hurling Championship final =

1966 All-Ireland Under-21 Hurling Final
- Event: 1966 All-Ireland Under-21 Hurling Championship
Cork	Wexford
3-12 4-9 9-9	5-6 4-9 5-9
- Date: 2 October 1966; 23 October 1966 (replay); 13 November 1966 (2nd replay)
- Venue: Nowlan Park; Gaelic Grounds (replay); Croke Park (2nd replay)
- Referee: Donie Nealon; Ger Fitzgerald (replay); Ger Fitzgerald (2nd replay)

The 1966 All-Ireland Under-21 Hurling Championship final was a hurling match played at Nowlan Park, Kilkenny on 2 October 1966 to determine the winners of the 1966 All-Ireland Under-21 Hurling Championship, the 3rd season of the All-Ireland Under-21 Hurling Championship, a tournament organised by the Gaelic Athletic Association for the champion teams of the four provinces of Ireland. The final was contested by Cork of Munster and Wexford of Leinster, with the game ending in a 3–12 to 5–6 draw. The replay took place on 23 October 1966, with both sides finishing level at 4-9 apiece. A second replay took place on 13 November 1966, with Cork winning by 9–9 to 5–9.

The All-Ireland final between Cork and Wexford was a unique occasion as it was their first ever championship meeting. Wexford were hoping to retain the title, while Cork were hoping to win their first All-Ireland title in the grade.

Cork were without goalkeeper Jim Casey, Denis Coughlan and Andrew Flynn, who were touring the United States with Glen Rovers. A thrilling game followed with Seánie Barry, who scored 2–7 in all, securing the equalizing point on the call of time.

The replay took place in the Gaelic Grounds in conjunction with the final of the All-Ireland Junior Football Championship. Once again the sides couldn't be separated and a 4-9 apiece draw was the result.

For the only time in the history of the championship, the final went to a third game. A huge 9–9 to 5–9 victory gave Cork the title at the third time of asking. Team captain Gerald McCarthy had the unique distinction of becoming the first, and to date the only, player to captain All-Ireland-winning senior and under-21 titles in the same year.

Cork's All-Ireland victory was their first in the under-21 grade. It was also the beginning of a golden age in the grade which resulted in the winning of seven All-Ireland titles in eleven years.

Wexford's defeat in the final started a sequence of bad luck in All-Ireland finals. It was the first of eleven All-Ireland final defeats over the course of the next fifty years.

== Match details ==
=== Drawn match ===
2 October 1966

Cork	3-12 - 5-6	Wexford
S Barry 2-8, E O'Brien 1-0, J Russell 0-1, P O'Riordan 0-1, C McCarthy 0-1, J McCarthy 0-1.		M Gardiner 1-2, J Quigley 1-1, E Cousins 1-0, T Doran 1-0, W Murphy 1-0 (og), T Murphy 0-1, S Barron 0-1, C Dowdall 0-1.

Nowlan Park
Referee: D Nealon (Tipperary)

=== Replay ===
23 October 1966

Cork	4-9 - 4-9	Wexford
A Flynn 3-0, C McCarthy 1-2, S Barry 0-5, P Curley 0-1, J McCarthy 0-1.		T Doran 1-2, C Dowdall 1-1, S Barron 0-4, E Cousins 1-0, P Quigley 1-0, N Rochford 0-1, M Garland 0-1.

Gaelic Grounds
Referee: G Fitzgerald (Limerick)

=== Second replay ===
13 November 1966

Cork	9-9 - 5-9	Wexford
C McCarthy 2-2, E O'Brien 2-1, P Curley 2-1, A Flynn 2-0, S Barry 1-2, J McCarthy 0-3.		S Barron 3-4, P Quigley 1-0, T Doran 1-0, C Dowdall 0-2, E Cousins 0-1, M Gardiner 0-1, M Jacob 0-1.

Croke Park
Referee: J Martin (Tyrone)
