= Billy Galligan =

Irish hurler (1937–2023)

Personal information
- Nickname: Billy Gal
- Born: 5 January 1937 Charleville, County Cork, Ireland
- Died: 1 February 2023 (aged 86) Westbury, County Clare, Ireland
- Occupation: Cobbler

Sport
- Sport: Hurling
- Position: Right wing-forward
Clubs
Years	Club	Apps (scores)
1955-1959 1958–1959 1960–1968 1960–1968 1969–1975	Charleville → Avondhu; Blackrock; Lees; Claughaun	2 (0-03); 19 (14-62)
Club titles
- Cork titles: 1
Inter-county
- Years: County
- 1958–1962: Cork
Inter-county titles
- Munster titles: 0
- All-Irelands: 0
- NHL: 0

William Galligan (5 January 1937 – 1 February 2023) was an Irish hurler. He lined out with a number of club sides, including Charleville, Lees, Blackrock and Claughaun, and also played at inter-county level with Cork.

== Career ==
Galligan first played hurling at juvenile and underage levels with the Seán Clárachs side that won consecutive North Cork MHC titles in 1952 and 1953. He progressed to adult level with Charleville, with his performances also earning selection for the Avondhu divisional team. Galligan transferred to the Blackrock club in 1960 and won a Cork SHC title after a defeat of Avondhu in the 1961 final. He transferred to the Claughaun club in Limerick in 1969 and won two consecutive Limerick SFC titles as well as a Limerick SHC title in 1971.

Galligan first appeared on the inter-county scene as right wing-forward on the Cork junior hurling team that beat Warwickshire in the 1958 All-Ireland final. He won a Munster JHC medal in 1960. Galligan also made a number of appearances for the senior team in various tournament games, however, he never made it onto the championship team. Galligan won an All-Ireland IHC medal in 1965.

== Personal life and death ==
Galligan's father, also called Bill, was also a hurler who played with a number of club teams, including Bruree, Croom, Ballyhea and Charleville. He also played with the London Irish team in the All-Ireland JHC. His son, Mike Galligan, played with Claughan and won National League and Munster SHC medals with Limerick.

Galligan died on 1 February 2023, at the age of 86.

== Honours ==
Seán Clárachs

- North Cork Minor Hurling Championship: 1952, 1953

Blackrock

- Cork Senior Hurling Championship: 1961

Claughaun

- Limerick Senior Hurling Championship: 1971
- Limerick Senior Football Championship: 1970, 1971

Cork

- All-Ireland Intermediate Hurling Championship: 1965
- Munster Intermediate Hurling Championship: 1965
- All-Ireland Junior Hurling Championship: 1958
- Munster Junior Hurling Championship: 1958, 1960
