= Paddy Behan =

Irish hurler

Personal information
- Native name: Pádraig Ó Beacháin (Irish)
- Born: 1936 Ballyhea, County Cork, Ireland
- Died: 10 June 1992 (aged 55) Churchtown, County Cork, Ireland
- Height: 5 ft 8 in (173 cm)

Sport
- Sport: Hurling
- Position: Full-forward
Clubs
- Years: Club
- Ballyhea → Avondhu; Churchtown
Club titles
- Cork titles: 1
Inter-county
Years	County	Apps (scores)
1960-1961	Cork	1 (0-00)
Inter-county titles
- Munster titles: 0
- All-Irelands: 0
- NHL: 0
- All Stars: 0

Patrick Behan (1936 – 10 June 1992) was an Irish hurler. At club level he played with Ballyhea and Churchtown, divisional side Avondhu and at inter-county level was a member of the Cork senior hurling team. Behan usually lined out as a forward.

== Career ==
Behan first played hurling at club level with Ballyhea and won several North Cork JHC titles with the club. His performances earned a call-up to the Avondhu team and he captained the divisional side to the Cork SHC title in 1966. Behan first played at inter-county level as a member of the Cork senior hurling team during the unsuccessful 1960 Munster SHC campaign. He was later drafted onto the Cork junior hurling team that lost the 1960 All-Ireland home final to Carlow. Behan also lined out with the Cork intermediate hurling team in the early rounds of their successful 1964 Munster IHC campaign.

== Death ==
Behan died after a long period of ill health on 10 June 1992, aged 55.

== Honours ==
Avondhu

- Cork Senior Hurling Championship: 1966 (c)

Cork

- Munster Intermediate Hurling Championship: 1964
