= Gerald McCarthy (hurler) =

Irish hurler & manager (born 1945)

Personal information
- Native name: Gearóid Mac Cárthaigh (Irish)
- Born: 12 September 1945 (age 81) Bandon Road, Cork, Ireland
- Occupations: Stonecutter, trophy maker
- Height: 5 ft 9 in (175 cm)

Sport
- Sport: Hurling
- Position: Midfield
Club
- Years: Club
- 1963–1979: St Finbarr's
Club titles
- Cork titles: 4
- Munster titles: 3
- All-Ireland Titles: 2
Inter-county
Years	County	Apps (scores)
1964–1979	Cork	41 (4–58)
Inter-county titles
- Munster titles: 9
- All-Irelands: 5
- NHL: 3
- All Stars: 1

Gerald McCarthy (born 12 September 1945) is an Irish former hurling manager and player. In his playing career he was known for his intelligent anticipation, his ability to find open space and his overhead striking of the ball. A versatile player who lined out in no less than eight different positions, McCarthy made his name as an attacking midfielder and as a centre-forward. He is widely regarded to be one of the most skilful and stylish players of his generation and as one of the greatest players in the history of the sport.

Raised in Cork city, McCarthy came to Gaelic games prominence as a schoolboy. He joined the St Finbarr's senior team at the age of 17 in 1963 and spent the next 16 years as one of the club's key players. McCarthy's association with Cork began as a member of the minor team in 1962. He progressed through the under-21 ranks before making his senior debut in 1964. McCarthy brought his 17-season association with the red jersey to an end when he announced his club and inter-county retirement in October 1979.

McCarthy is one of the most decorated players of his era. During his time with Cork, he won five All-Ireland Championship titles - including a three-in-a-row from 1976 to 1978, nine Munster Championship titles and three National Hurling League titles. McCarthy captained Cork on several occasions, particularly in 1966 when, as captain with the Cork under-21 team also, he became the only player in history to captain two All-Ireland-winning teams in the same season.

In retirement from playing, McCarthy enjoyed success as a trainer, coach, selector and manager at club and inter-county levels. After winning numerous Cork SHC titles with St Finbarr's, he became a highly sought-after coach at inter-county level. McCarthy had three spells as coach-manager of the Cork senior team, culminating with an All-Ireland title in 1990. He later managed the Waterford senior hurling team to a first All-Ireland semi-final appearance in 35 years.

== Playing career ==
=== St Finbarr's ===
McCarthy was born and raised in the Bandon Road area on the southside of Cork. He first made an impression as a schoolboy dual player at Greenmount National School and in the local street leagues, before joining the St Finbarr's club. McCarthy progressed through the ranks with the club, winning juvenile hurling and minor football championship medals, before joining the senior hurling team as a 17-year-old in 1963. He quickly became a regular member of the starting fifteen and scored two points in the 1964 Cork SHC final, which St Finbarr's lost to Glen Rovers by eight points. St Finbarr's made amends the following year, with McCarthy scoring a goal in the 6–08 to 2–05 win over University College Cork in the 1965 final, before later scoring in all three game in the successful Munster Club Championship campaign.

McCarthy was described in the Irish Press as the best player on the St Finbarr's team in their 1967 Cork SHC final defeat by Glen Rovers. This defeat was reversed the following year, with McCarthy winning a second championship medal, just 24 hours after his wedding, after a 5–09 to 1–19 defeat of Imokilly in the 1968 final.

The next few seasons proved difficult for the St Finbarr's hurlers, with McCarthy also lining out with the St Finbarr's football team in the senior championship. St Finbarr's returned to the Cork SHC final in 1971; however, Blackrock won by 2–19 to 5-04. The game was not without incident for McCarthy who received a six-month suspension from the Cork County Board as a result of "all aspects of his conduct" in the game. A number of difficult seasons followed at club level, however, St Finbarr's returned to the summit of Cork hurling with a defeat of reigning champions Blackrock in the 1974 Cork SHC final. After collecting his third winners' medal, McCarthy again played a key role as a scoring midfielder in the successful annexation of the Munster Club Championship title. St Finbarr's ended the season with the All-Ireland Club Championship title, with McCarthy playing at midfield in the eight-point defeat of the Fenians.

In the 1976 Cork SFC final, McCarthy showed that he was just as adept as a high level Gaelic footballer. He became a dual county medal-winner after lining out at right wing-back in the three-point defeat of St Michael's. Back on the hurling front McCarthy won a fourth and final Cork SHC winners' medal after a record crowd of 34,151 saw St Finbarr's beat Glen Rovers by twelve points in the 1977 final. The subsequent club championship resulted in St Finbarr's claiming a third Munster Club Championship title. McCarthy later claimed a second All-Ireland club winners' medal after a 2–07 to 0–09 win over Rathnure.

McCarthy's attempt at winning a fifth Cork SHC medal ended with a 2–14 to 2–06 defeat by Blackrock in the 1979 final. Three weeks after this defeat he announced his retirement from club and inter-county hurling.

=== Cork ===
==== Minor and under-21 ====
McCarthy's form as a dual player at club level with St Finbarr's earned him a place on the Cork minor hurling and football teams for the respective Munster Minor Championships in 1962. His two seasons with the minor teams resulted in successive defeats by Kerry in football and by Tipperary in hurling. McCarthy ended his dual player status in 1964 by deciding to concentrate solely on hurling when he joined the Cork under-21 hurling team. His first two seasons in the grade, much like his minor days, ended with successive defeats by Tipperary. McCarthy took over the captaincy of the team in 1966 and won a Munster Under-21 Championship title in spite of arriving late for the 5–12 to 2–06 defeat of Limerick in the final. The subsequent All-Ireland final against Wexford went to two replays, however, McCarthy made history by becoming the first player to captain two All-Ireland-winning teams in a single year. with the 9–09 to 5–09 win over Wexford coming just 10 weeks after the senior success.

==== Senior ====
Aged 18, McCarthy made his senior team debut on 26 April 1964 when he came on as a substitute for Mick McCarthy in the 1963–64 NHL semi-final against Wexford. McCarthy acquitted himself well in the defeat but was not included on the team for the 1964 Munster Championship. He lined out in a number of challenge, tournament and league games over the following two years, however, it was 1966 before he made his championship debut, coming on as a substitute in a Munster quarter-final draw with Clare. McCarthy remained on the starting fifteen for the rest of the campaign, while also taking over the team captaincy from Peter Doolan. After winning the Munster Championship title with a defeat of Waterford, he subsequently captained Cork to a first All-Ireland Championship in 12 years after a 3–09 to 1–10 defeat of Kilkenny in the 1966 All-Ireland final. McCarthy, who turned 21 a week later, became the youngest All-Ireland-winning Cork captain since Seán Condon in 1944 after accepting the Liam MacCarthy Cup.

Cork endured two unsuccessful years after winning the All-Ireland title; however, McCarthy's reputation as a midfielder of merit continued to grow. He was widely praised in the local newspapers as Cork's Hurler of the Year in 1967. McCarthy added to his medal collection with a National Hurling League title after a defeat of Wexford in the 1969 final. After winning the Munster Championship title after a first defeat of Tipperary in 12 years, Cork were denied a clean sweep of hurling titles following a six-point defeat by Kilkenny in the 1969 All-Ireland final. McCarthy's third appearance in an All-Ireland final in 1970 saw him claim a second winners' medal after the 6–21 to 5–10 win over Wexford. Having earlier won a third Munster Championship medal, he ended the season with a second successive National League title after a two-point aggregate win over New York in New York.

A six-month suspension resulted in McCarthy missing Cork's 1971–72 National League title success, however, he was reinstated to the team in time for the 1972 Munster final win iver Clare. For the third time in four years, Cork were presented with the possibility of making a clean sweep of all the available hurling titles, however, Cork suffered a 3–24 to 5–11 defeat by Kilkenny in the 1972 All-Ireland final, having led by eight points at one stage in the second half.

McCarthy won a third National League title after a 6–15 to 1–12 win over Limerick in the 1974 NHL final. He was selected as team captain for the second time in his career for the 1975 season. After winning a fifth Munster Championship title, McCarthy later captained Cork to their first ever All-Ireland semi-final defeat by Galway. He ended the season by being Cork's only recipient of an All-Star.

Cork consolidated their position as the top team in Munster by retaining the provincial title after a 3–15 to 4–05 defeat of Limerick in the 1975 Munster final. It was McCarthy's sixth winners' medal. After being caught at the semi-final stage the previous year, Cork's provincial title allowed the team to qualify automatically for the 1976 All-Ireland final. After conceding two goals to Wexford in the opening six minutes, Cork fought back to win the game by 2–21 to 4–11. Having collected his third All-Ireland medal, McCarthy was also named man of the match. Cork subsequently went through a period of dominance that they hadn't enjoyed in over 20 years. A third successive Munster Championship was followed by a second successive appearance against Wexford in the 1977 All-Ireland final. McCarthy, who had been switched from midfield to centre-forward earlier in the season, ended the 1–17 to 3–08 victory with a second successive man of the match award and a fourth All-Ireland winners' medal.

McCarthy was the longest-serving member of the Cork team when he began his 15th season in 1978. After securing a Munster Championship four-in-a-row, Cork turned their attention to the All-Ireland three-in-a-row when they qualified for the 1978 All-Ireland final against Kilkenny. McCarthy was once again at centre-forward and claimed his fifth All-Ireland medal following the 1–15 to 2–08 victory. The possibility of Cork winning a record-equalling fourth successive All-Ireland meant that McCarthy, who was approaching his 34th birthday, decided to remain with the team for one final season. His decision resulted in a ninth Munster Championship medal after an 11-point win over Limerick in the 1979 Munster final. Age and the exertions of the three previous campaigns finally caught up with Cork in the All-Ireland semi-final and a 2–14 to 1–13 defeat by Galway brought the four-in-a-row dream to an end. The following month McCarthy captained Cork against Tipperary in the Christy Ring Memorial Fund game, in what was his last game for Cork.

=== Inter-provincial ===
McCarthy earned his first call-up to the Munster team during the 1968 Railway Cup. It was the first of four successive years with the inter-provincial team and yielded three successive Railway Cup medals after defeats of Leinster (1968, 1970) and Connacht as captain of the team. After a three-year hiatus, McCarthy earned inclusion on the Munster team once again. Defeats of Leinster in 1976 and Connacht in 1978 brought his medal tally to five.

== Early coaching career ==
=== St Finbarr's ===
When McCarthy retired from playing in October 1979, he hinted that he would be interested in becoming involved in team management and coaching. He was appointed coach of the St Finbarr's senior team less than two months later. McCarthy first season as coach yielded the Cork SHC title after a 1–09 to 2–04 win over Glen Rovers in the 1980 final. St Finbarr's nearly completed a dream season; however, after securing the Munster Club Championship title, the team was beaten by Ballyhale Shamrocks in the 1981 All-Ireland club hurling final. McCarthy remained in situ as coach and guided the team to a second successive Cork SHC title after a three-point win over Glen Rovers once again. He described that victory as "the best moment I have savoured since giving up hurling." McCarthy stepped down as coach in December 1981, citing the "pressure of business" as the reason for his decision.

=== Cork ===
McCarthy's successful first season with St Finbarr's resulted in him becoming a selector with the Cork senior hurling team in October 1980. He took over as coach of the team a short while later following the stepping down from the position of Bertie Troy. McCarthy had a successful first season by guiding the team to the 1980-81 National League title after a defeat of Offaly in the final. His second season at the helm saw Cork win the Munster Championship after a record 31-point defeat of Waterford, before losing the 1982 All-Ireland final to Kilkenny. McCarthy stepped down as coach in November 1982.

=== St Finbarr's return ===
McCarthy continued coaching at juvenile and underage levels with St Finbarr's even while he was coach of the Cork senior team. He also took over as chairman of the club's hurling section, a position which allowed him become a selector with the senior team once again. McCarthy's first season back on the sideline saw St Finbarr's lose the 1983 Cork SHC final to Midleton. The selection team remained in place after this defeat and went on to guide the team to a sixth successive final appearance in 1984. The 1–15 to 2–04 win over Ballyhea gave McCarthy a third championship win in management. He remained as a selector until 1986.

=== Cork return ===
McCarthy returned to the inter-county scene when he was named trainer of the Cork senior hurling team in October 1989 in partnership with Father Michael O'Brien who would serve as manager of the team. His first season back with the team saw Cork win the Munster Championship title after a surprise victory over reigning All-Ireland champions Tipperary. Cork were also underdogs for the 1990 All-Ireland final against Galway, however, a second-half comeback saw McCarthy's side take the title after a 5–15 to 2–21 victory.

After losing their provincial and All-Ireland titles in 1991, McCarthy's side reclaimed the Munster Championship after a 1–22 to 3–11 over Limerick in the 1992 Munster final. Cork faced Kilkenny in the subsequent All-Ireland final but suffered a 3–10 to 1–12 defeat. McCarthy's side began the 1992–93 season by claiming the National League title after a three-game saga with Wexford in the final, however, their 1993 Munster Championship campaign ended at an early stage against Clare. With that defeat the Cork management team resigned, however, it was widely expected in the media that McCarthy would be appointed to the position of manager. He failed to secure the nomination of his club to the new management team, was therefore disallowed from taking the post with Johnny Clifford becoming manager instead.

=== Adare ===
After ending his involvement with the Cork senior team in June 1993, McCarthy immediately returned to club management as coach of the Adare team in Limerick. He once again brought an immediate level of success to his new position, steering the team to the 1993 Limerick SHC final where they lost to Patrickswell by ten points.

== Managing Waterford ==
McCarthy remained out of inter-county coaching for several years before returning as manager of the Waterford senior hurling team on 16 November 1996. In his first year in charge he introduced a new training regime and cut a number of players from the panel. Waterford later lost at home to Dublin and failed to win promotion from Division Two of the National League. In their opening game of the championship a Limerick team in decline beat them by six points and Waterford's campaign ended unceremoniously.

In his second year in charge McCarthy's side made significant progress in the National League and even reached the final. A 2–14 to 0–13 defeat by Cork was their lot in that game. The provincial championship saw McCarthy's side defeat Tipperary for the first time in fifteen years and reach the Munster final for the first time in almost a decade. That game between Clare and Waterford unexpectedly ended in a draw; however, a last-gasp Paul Flynn free which could have won the game went wide. Clare remained favourites to win on the second occasion; however, the replay was a tense affair. The match was played in exceedingly bad spirit as Clare's Brian Lohan and Waterford's Michael White were both shown red cards after a melee. A dirty game drew to its natural conclusion as Clare were the eventual winners. Waterford, however, still had a second chance for the All-Ireland title due to the "back-door" system. A ten-point defeat of Galway in the All-Ireland quarter-final set up an All-Ireland semi-final meeting with Kilkenny. Waterford, however, followed a great performance with a mediocre one and, in a game which was there for the taking, allowed the Cat's to win by just a single point on a score line of 1–11 to 1–10.

In the following year McCarthy's Waterford team beat Limerick in their opening championship game, before exiting the championship to Cork in a game that was notable for Cork manager Jimmy Barry Murphy giving championship debuts to six players. Waterford exited the first championship of the new century after narrowly losing to Tipperary in their opening Munster championship game of the year. McCarthy announced after the defeat that he would stay on as manager for at least another year. In their 2001 opening championship game against Limerick Waterford raced into an eleven point lead early in the first half, only for Limerick to eventually reel Waterford in and go on to beat Waterford by three points. It was the end of Waterford's summer for a second consecutive year after their opening game.

McCarthy announced after the defeat that he was resigning as manager of the Waterford Senior hurling team after feeling that he could no longer take Waterford hurling any further as a manager. McCarthy is credited for improving the standards of preparation of the Waterford team and also for introducing more professional and modern training methods. While McCarthy didn't win any major honours with Waterford his tenure as manager is looked on fondly by fans, and he was also the man who led Waterford to their first win at Croke Park in a championship game since the 1959 All Ireland Hurling Final.

== Managing Cork ==
McCarthy was appointed manager of the Cork senior hurling team on 8 November 2006. His appointment was seen as controversial from the start as Ger Cunningham, a selector under previous manager John Allen and the favourite for the job, was not even approached about the vacant post.

Cork's opening championship game under McCarthy against Clare provided controversy even before the sliotar was thrown in. Both teams emerged from the tunnel at the same time and a huge melee erupted under the stand as players from both teams became involved. Cork won that game, however, Seán Óg Ó hAilpín, Diarmuid O'Sullivan and Dónal Óg Cusack were suspended. Cork even without those three key players came close to snatching a draw with Waterford in their next game, when a last second shot for a goal rebounded off the crossbar. After beating Dublin and Offaly in the qualifiers, and despite losing a first championship game to Tipperary since 1991 Cork exited the championship at the hands of Waterford in an All-Ireland quarter-final replay. In the drawn game Waterford required a late point from a controversial free to secure a replay.

The appointment of Teddy Holland as manager of the Cork senior football team in October 2007 saw the Cork senior footballers withdraw their services. The players from the county's senior hurling team withdrew their services in sympathy. The strike continued until February 2008, which resulted in McCarthy's side withdrawing from the Waterford Crystal Cup as well as postponing their opening National Hurling League games against Kilkenny and Waterford. Cork were later forced to forfeit their league points after failing to fulfill these fixtures. Cork's championship campaign saw the team surrender an 85-year-old home record against Tipperary. Cork under McCarthy went on to beat Dublin, Galway and Clare before exiting the championship at the hands of Kilkenny in an All-Ireland semi-final.

Following this defeat McCarthy's two-year contract came to an end and it was expected that he would be replaced as manager, however, he was later re-appointed for a further two-year term by the Cork County Board, in spite of the majority of the players not wanting him to stay on. The players on the 2008 panel led by Donal Óg Cusack then refused to play or train under McCarthy. (see 2008-2009 Cork players strike). McCarthy accordingly began the 2009 league campaign with a new squad, none of whom had been able to make the previous year's panel.

On 10 March 2009, McCarthy eventually resigned after four months of severe pressure, having received death threats.

== Personal life ==
McCarthy married Mary Murphy at the Church of the Immaculate Conception, the Lough, on 14 September 1968.

== Career statistics ==
=== Player ===
Team	Year	National League			Munster		All-Ireland		Total	
Team	Year	Division	Apps	Score	Apps	Score	Apps	Score	Apps	Score
Cork	1963-64	Division 1A	1	0-00	—		—		1	0-00
Cork	1964-65	Division 1A	—		—		—		—	
Cork	1965-66	Division 1B	4	0-01	4	0-02	1	0-01	9	0-04
Cork	1966-67	Division 1B	2	0-03	1	0-00	—		3	0-03
Cork	1967-68	Division 1B	5	2-09	3	0-07	—		8	2-16
Cork	1968-69	Division 1B	6	0-00	4	0-02	1	0-01	11	0-03
Cork	1969-70	Division 1B	8	1-10	2	0-03	1	0-02	11	1-15
Cork	1970-71	Division 1A	4	1-04	1	0-00	—		5	1-04
Cork	1971-72	Division 1A	0	0-00	3	2-04	1	0-00	4	2-04
Cork	1972-73	Division 1A	6	0-13	1	0-08	—		7	0-21
Cork	1973-74	Division 1A	8	1-13	1	1-01	—		9	2-14
Cork	1974-75	Division 1A	7	5-15	3	1-08	1	0-03	11	6-26
Cork	1975-76	Division 1A	4	0-03	2	0-01	1	0-00	7	0-04
Cork	1976-77	Division 1A	3	0-02	2	0-01	2	0-08	7	0-11
Cork	1977-78	Division 1A	5	0-03	2	0-02	1	0-02	8	0-07
Cork	1978-79	Division 1B	3	2-03	2	0-01	1	0-01	6	2-05
Career total			66	12-79	31	4-40	10	0-18	107	16-137

=== Manager ===
Team	From	To	National League				Munster				All-Ireland				Total				
Team	From	To	G	W	D	L	G	W	D	L	G	W	D	L	G	W	D	L	Win %
Waterford	16 November 1996	10 June 2001	33	19	1	13	9	3	1	5	2	1	0	1	44	23	2	19	52
Cork	8 November 2006	10 March 2009	16	8	0	8	3	1	0	2	9	5	1	3	28	14	1	13	50

== Honours ==
=== Player ===
St Finbarr's

- All-Ireland Senior Club Hurling Championship: 1975, 1978
- Munster Senior Club Hurling Championship: 1965, 1974, 1977
- Cork Senior Hurling Championship: 1965, 1968, 1974, 1977
- Cork Senior Football Championship: 1976

Cork

- All-Ireland Senior Hurling Championship: 1966 (c), 1970, 1976, 1977, 1978
- Munster Senior Hurling Championship: 1966 (c), 1969, 1970, 1972, 1975 (c), 1976, 1977, 1978, 1979 (c)
- National Hurling League: 1968–69, 1969–70, 1973–74
- All-Ireland Under-21 Hurling Championship: 1966 (c)
- Munster Under-21 Hurling Championship: 1966 (c)

Munster

- Railway Cup: 1968, 1969, 1970 (c), 1976, 1978

=== Coach ===
St Finbarr's

- Munster Senior Club Hurling Championship: 1980
- Cork Senior Club Hurling Championship: 1980, 1981, 1984
- Cork Senior Camogie Championship: 2006

Cork

- All-Ireland Senior Hurling Championship: 1990
- Munster Senior Hurling Championship: 1982, 1990, 1992
- National Hurling League: 1992–93

Achievements
Preceded by Willie O'Neill	All-Ireland Under-21 Hurling Final winning captain 1966	Succeeded by P.J. Ryan
Preceded by Jimmy Doyle	All-Ireland Senior Hurling Final winning captain 1966	Succeeded by Jim Treacy
Preceded by Len Gaynor	Railway Cup Hurling Final winning captain 1970	Succeeded by Tony Doran
Sporting positions
Preceded by Peter Doolan	Cork Senior Hurling Captain; 1966	Succeeded by Jack Russell
Preceded by Len Gaynor	Munster Hurling Captain; 1970	Succeeded by Ray Cummins
Preceded by John Horgan	Cork Senior Hurling Captain; 1975	Succeeded by Ray Cummins
Preceded by Fr. Bertie Troy	Cork Senior Hurling Coach; 1980–1982	Succeeded by Johnny Clifford
Preceded by Tony Mansfield	Waterford Senior Hurling Manager; 1996–2001	Succeeded by Justin McCarthy
Preceded by John Allen	Cork Senior Hurling Manager; 2006–2009	Succeeded by John Considine
