= Centenary Cup =

The Centenary Cup comprised two Gaelic games competitions arranged by the Gaelic Athletic Association to mark the organisation's centenary in 1984. This was followed by the similar, but less popular Open Draw in 1985.

The hurling competition was won by Cork and the football competition was won by Meath.

== Hurling ==
Match	Date	Venue	Team	Score	Team	Score
Preliminary Round	April 15	Portaferry	Westmeath	2-14	Down	1-10
Preliminary Round	April 15	Athleague	Roscommon	3-5	Wexford	2-7
1st Round	April 28	Loughrea	Galway	2-17	Dublin	0-8
1st Round	April 29	Casement Park	Waterford	3-12	Antrim	3-11
1st Round	April 29	Newbridge	Tipperary	5-20	Kildare	4-7
1st Round	April 29	Borris-in-Ossory	Laois	2-9	Limerick	2-8
1st Round	April 29	Athleague	Cork	3-18	Roscommon	1-8
1st Round	April 29	Limerick	Clare	4-10	Kerry	0-9
1st Round	April 29	Aughrim	Kilkenny	3-17	Wicklow	2-8
1st Round	April 29	Mullingar	Offaly	1-15	Westmeath	0-14
Quarter-final	May 6	Semple Stadium	Galway	3-14	Waterford	2-8
Quarter-final	May 6	Nowlan Park	Laois	1-17	Tipperary	4-7
Quarter-final	May 6	Semple Stadium	Cork	0-14	Clare	1-5
Quarter-final	May 6	Croke Park	Offaly	1-17	Kilkenny	2-11
Semi-final	May 13	Semple Stadium	Laois	5-7	Galway	4-9
Semi-final	May 13	Semple Stadium	Cork	1-15	Offaly	3-7
Final	May 20	Croke Park	Cork	2-21	Laois	1-9

== Football ==
Match	Date	Venue	Team	Score	Team	Score
1st Round	April 8	Ballybofey	Kerry	0-11	Donegal	0-8
1st Round	April 8	Pearse Park (aet)	Longford	1-9	Down	0-11
1st Round	April 8	Dr. Cullen Park	Meath	4-10	Carlow	0-9
1st Round	April 8	Aughrim	Wicklow	1-10	Clare	0-7
1st Round	April 8	Lurgan	Wexford	3-3	Armagh	0-6
1st Round	April 8	Cusack Park	Westmeath	0-7	Dublin	0-5
1st Round	April 8	Ballinascreen	Derry	0-7	Cork	0-6
1st Round	April 8	Emmet Park	Monaghan	0-15	Limerick	1-8
1st Round	April 8	Páirc Sheáin Mhic Dhiarmada	Galway	1-9	Leitrim	1-7
1st Round	April 8	Casement Park	Fermanagh	0-10	Antrim	1-6
1st Round	April 8	Drogheda	Cavan	0-9	Louth	0-5
1st Round	April 8	Markievicz Park	Mayo	1-8	Sligo	1-5
1st Round	April 8	Nowlan Park	Roscommon	1-14	Kilkenny	0-7
1st Round	April 8	Dungarvan	Offaly	1-13	Waterford	2-6
1st Round	April 8	Dungannon	Tyrone	2-7	Kildare	0-10
1st Round	April 8	Cahir	Laois	0-11	Tipperary	0-8
2nd Round	April 21	Tuam (aet)	Derry	2-11	Kerry	1-13
2nd Round	April 21	Tuam	Galway	0-14	Longford	1-7
2nd Round	April 29	Breffni Park (aet)	Cavan	2-17	Roscommon	0-10
2nd Round	April 29	Dungannon	Offaly	0-12	Tyrone	0-11
2nd Round	April 29	Portarlington	Meath	1-9	Laois	1-6
2nd Round	April 29	Irvinestown	Wicklow	0-9	Fermanagh	1-5
2nd Round	April 29	Ballina	Monaghan	1-11	Mayo	0-6
2nd Round	April 29	Wexford Park	Wexford	3-10	Westmeath	0-4
Quarter-final	May 6	Tullamore	Meath	2-18	Galway	0-11
Quarter-final	May 6	Newbridge	Cavan	1-9	Wexford	1-7
Quarter-final	May 6	Croke Park	Monaghan	1-10	Offaly	0-10
Quarter-final	May 6	Navan	Derry	3-10	Wicklow	0-6
Semi-final	May 13	Croke Park	Meath	3-12	Cavan	0-8
Semi-final	May 13	Croke Park	Monaghan	0-22	Derry	2-11
Final	May 20	Croke Park	Meath	0-10	Monaghan	0-8
