= 1998 Cork Junior A Hurling Championship =

- Dates: 27 September – 15 November 1998
- Teams: 7
- Champions: Bride Rovers (1st title); Donal Ryan (captain); Seánie Barry (manager)
- Runners-up: Freemount; John Morrissey (captain); Pat Curtin (manager)

Tournament statistics
- Matches played: 7
- Goals scored: 12 (1.71 per match)
- Points scored: 145 (20.71 per match)
- Top scorer(s): Colman Murphy (0-23)

The 1998 Cork Junior A Hurling Championship was the 101st staging of the Cork Junior A Hurling Championship since its establishment by the Cork County Board. The championship ran from 27 September to 15 November 1998.

The final was played on 15 November 1998 at Páirc Uí Chaoimh in Cork, between Bride Rovers and Freemount, in what was their first ever meeting in the final. Bride Rovers won the match by 2-10 to 0-13 to claim their first ever championship title.

Ballinascarthy's Colman Murphy was the championship's top scorer with 0-23.

== Qualification ==
| Division | Championship | Champions |
|---|---|---|
| Avondhu | North Cork Junior A Hurling Championship | Dromina |
| Carbery | South West Junior A Hurling Championship | Ballinascarty |
| Carrigdhoun | South East Junior A Hurling Championship | Ballinhassig |
| Duhallow | Duhallow Junior A Hurling Championship | Freemount |
| Imokilly | East Cork Junior A Hurling Championship | Bride Rovers |
| Muskerry | Mid Cork Junior A Hurling Championship | Aghabullogue |
| Seandún | City Junior A Hurling Championship | Nemo Rangers |

== Results ==
=== Quarter-finals ===
| 27 September 1998 Quarter-final | Freemount | 1-12 - 1-06 | Aghabullogue | O'Connell Memorial Park |
| | J O'Flynn 0-7, D Murphy 1-0, B Broderick 0-2, M Nunan 0-1, B Murphy 0-1, A Keane 0-1. | | E Lynch 1-0, J McSweeney 0-3, C McSweeney 0-1, K Barry-Murphy 0-1, D Spillane 0-1. |

| 27 September 1998 Quarter-final | Ballinascarthy | 0-13 - 2-07 | Dromina | Páirc Uí Rinn |
| | C Murphy 0-9, W Deasy 0-2, C O'Brien 0-1, K Ryan 0-1. | | M Buckley 2-0, M Finn 0-5, A O'Shaughnessy 0-2. |

| 4 October 1998 Quarter-final replay | Ballinascarthy | 1-11 - 1-09 | Dromina | Páirc Uí Rinn |
| | C Murphy 0-5, W Deasy 1-1, C O'Brien 0-2, J Kingston 0-2, K Ryan 0-1. | | M Finn 1-3, P Gauld 0-2, G Buckley 0-2, J Hamilton 0-1, M Buckley 0-1. |

| 18 October 1998 Quarter-final | Nemo Rangers | 1-09 - 0-11 | Ballinhassig | Ted Hanley Memorial Park |
| | C McCarthy 0-6, A Cronin 1-1, I Murphy 0-1, S Calnan 0-1. | | J O'Sullivan 0-6, D Lombard 0-1, D McCarthy 0-1, S McCarthy 0-1, A Holland 0-1, D Dineen 0-1. |

=== Semi-finals ===
| 10 October 1998 Semi-final | Bride Rovers | 1-14 - 1-13 | Ballinascarthy | Páirc Uí Rinn |
| | J O'Driscoll 1-4, B McHugh 0-3, T Broderick 0-2, P Murphy 0-2, S Ryan 0-1, J Murphy 0-1, M Hogan 0-1. | | C Murphy 0-9, K Dineen 1-0, W Deasy 0-2, J Dineen 0-1, P Deasy 0-1. |

| 1 November 1998 Semi-final | Freemount | 1-10 - 0-07 | Nemo Rangers | Ballyanley Grounds |
| | D Murphy 1-0, J O'Flynn 0-3, A Keane 0-3, B Broderick 0-2, G Withers 0-1, D Broderick 0-1. | | C McCarthy 0-4, S Calnan 0-2, M Morgan 0-1. |

=== Final ===
| 15 November 1998 Final | Bride Rovers | 2-10 - 0-13 | Freemount | Páirc Uí Chaoimh |
| | T Broderick 1-1, P Murphy 0-4, S Ryan 1-0, D Ryan 0-3, J O'Driscoll 0-2. | | B Broderick 0-4, D Broderick 0-3, J O'Flynn 0-3, J Broderick 0-1, A Keane 0-1, G Withers 0-1. | Referee: W Horgan (Brian Dillons) |

== Championship statistics ==
=== Top scorers ===
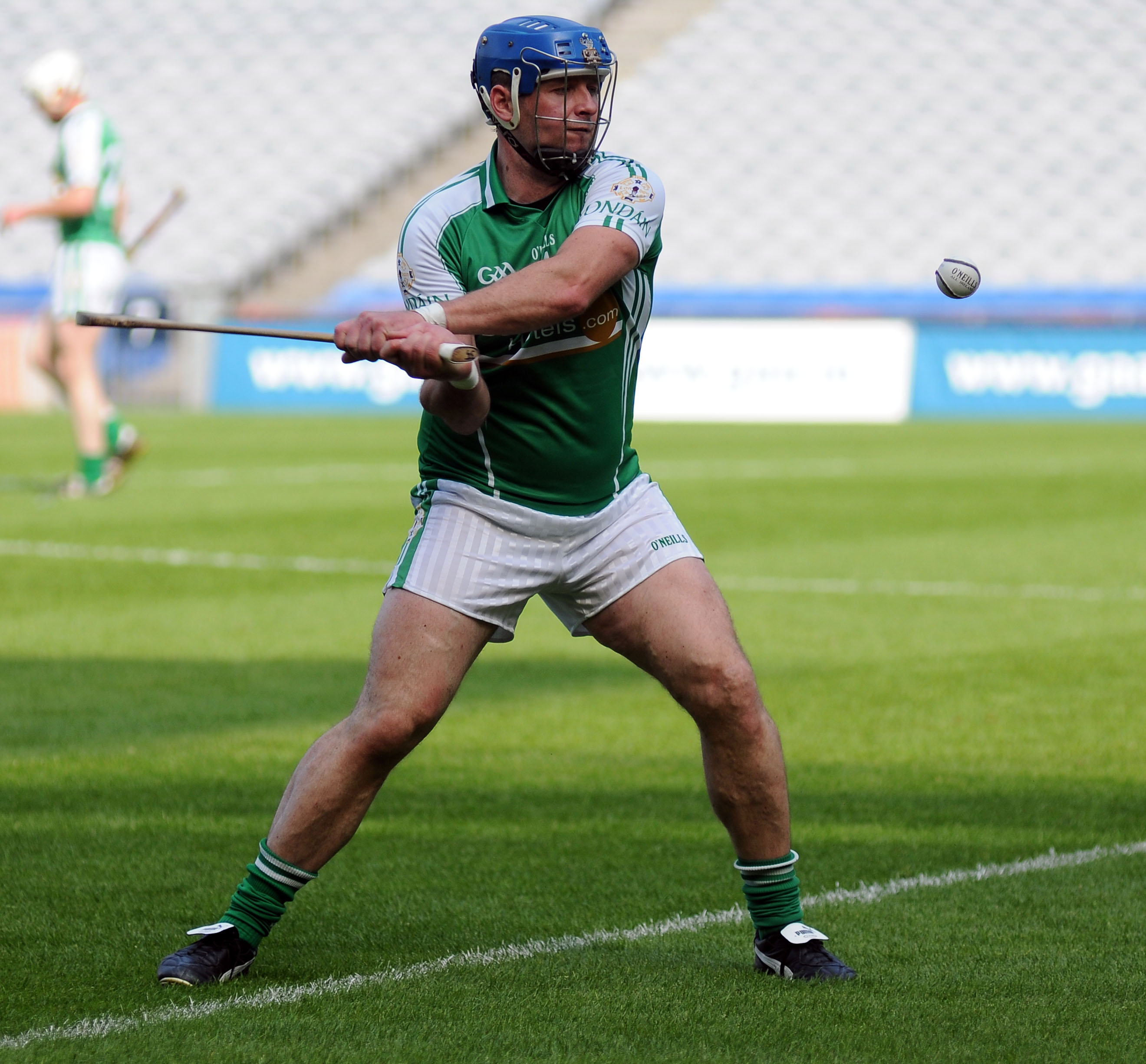
Martin Finn

| Rank | Player | County | Tally | Total | Matches | Average |
|---|---|---|---|---|---|---|
| 1 | Colman Murphy | Ballinascarthy | 0-23 | 23 | 3 | 7.66 |
| 2 | John O'Flynn | Freemount | 0-13 | 13 | 3 | 4.33 |
| 3 | Martin Finn | Dromina | 1-08 | 11 | 2 | 5.50 |
| 4 | Colin McCarthy | Nemo Rangers | 0-10 | 10 | 2 | 5.00 |
| 5 | Jerome O'Driscoll | Bride Rovers | 1-06 | 9 | 2 | 4.50 |

=== Miscellaneous ===
- Bride Rovers coach, Seánie Barry, was not present at the final due to his missionary work as a Roman Catholic priest in Malawi. He heard the result two hours after the match had ended.
