= 1967 Fitzgibbon Cup =

Irish collegiate hurling tournament

- Dates: 4–5 March 1967
- Teams: 2
- Champions: University College Cork (21st title); Seánie Barry (captain)
- Runners-up: University College Dublin

Tournament statistics
- Matches played: 3
- Goals scored: 18 (6 per match)
- Points scored: 55 (18.33 per match)

The 1967 Fitzgibbon Cup was the 54th staging of the Fitzgibbon Cup since its establishment by the Gaelic Athletic Association in 1912. Trinity College Dublin hosted the cup from 4 to 5 March 1967.

University College Cork were the defending champions.

On 5 March 1967, University College Cork won the Fitzgibbon Cup after beating University College Galway by 3–17 to 2–05 in the final. This was their 21st cup title overall and their second title in succession.

== Results ==
=== Semi-finals ===
4 March 1967 Semi-final	University College Cork	1-11 - 1-06	University College Dublin	O'Toole Park

4 March 1967 Semi-final	University College Galway	8-10 - 3-06	Trinity College Dublin	O'Toole Park

=== Final ===
5 March 1967 Final	University College Cork	3-17 - 2-05	University College Galway	Croke Park
