= 1985 Ford Open Draw Cup =

The 1985 Ford Open Draw Cup was a Gaelic Games competition arranged by the Gaelic Athletic Association as follow-on to the high successful 1984 Centenary Cup. This was a far less popular event and there was widespread resistance. A number of counties refused to participate. The hurling competition was won by Tipperary and the football competition was won by Kerry.

== Hurling ==
- Limerick objected to the competition and refused to enter into the hurling comp.

Match	Date	Venue	Team	Score	Team	Score
1st Round	March 24	New Ross (aet)	Wexford	6-15	Cork	5-17
1st Round	March 24	Longford	Wicklow	2-12	Longford	0-4
1st Round	March 24	Carlow	Carlow	2-14	Roscommon	3-8
1st Round	March 24	Dungiven	Kerry	0-14	Derry	1-5
1st Round	March 24	Borris-in-Ossory	Antrim	6-6	Laois	4-10
1st Round	March 24	Dungarvan	Waterford	9-25	Mayo	2-6
1st Round	March 24	Trim	Tipperary	3-18	Meath	0-7
2nd Round	March 31	Mullingar	Kilkenny	1-15	Westmeath	2-8
2nd Round	April 7	New Ross	Tipperary	1-14	Wexford	1-7
2nd Round	April 7	Trim	Galway	7-14	Armagh	0-4
2nd Round	April 7	Carlow	Waterford	5-9	Carlow	0-5
Quarter-final	April 21	Aughrim	Clare	5-18	Wicklow	0-12
Quarter-final	April 21	Semple Stadium	Tipperary	2-17	Antrim	4-7
Quarter-final	April 21	Walsh Park	Kilkenny	2-12	Waterford	0-10
Quarter-final	April 21	Tralee	Galway	4-12	Kerry	0-8
Semi-final	April 28	Limerick	Tipperary	3-13	Clare	1-12
Semi-final	April 28	Limerick	Galway	0-13	Kilkenny	0-7
Final	May 5	Páirc Uí Chaoimh	Tipperary	1-13	Galway	1-10

== Football ==
- Dublin, Down, Kildare and Offaly refused to participate. Meath opposed the competition but decided to take part once it was to go ahead.
- League quarter-finalists were given a bye to Round 2 or later, depending on their progress in the knock-out stages of the league. Monaghan beat Armagh in National League final that year and were given a bye to the quarter-finals.

Match	Date	Venue	Team	Score	Team	Score
Preliminary	March 3	Tralee	Kerry	0-11	Westmeath	0-1
Preliminary	March 3	Navan	Meath	2-7	Antrim	1-8
Preliminary	March 3	Ballybofey	Donegal	0-8	Laois	0-4
Preliminary	March 3	Aughrim	Wicklow	2-11	Leitrim	1-7
1st Round	March 10	Páirc Uí Chaoimh	Cork	2-7	Cavan	1-7
1st Round	March 10	Dr. Cullen Park	Kerry	1-8	Carlow	0-9
1st Round	March 10	Tipperary	Galway	0-13	Tipperary	0-9
1st Round	March 10	Walsh Park (aet)	Waterford	2-7	Louth	1-8
1st Round	March 10	Ballyragget	Mayo	5-12	Kilkenny	0-5
1st Round	March 10	Irvinestown	Fermanagh	1-8	Clare	0-7
1st Round	March 10	Askeaton	Limerick	0-10	Derry	0-4
1st Round	March 10	Pearse Park	Wexford	0-6	Longford	0-5
1st Round	March 10	Ballyshannon	Donegal	1-8	Wicklow	0-9
1st Round	March 10	Markievicz Park	Meath	2-13	Sligo	0-12
2nd Round	March 31	Tralee	Kerry	3-8	Galway	1-11
2nd Round	March 31	Askeaton	Limerick	3-6	Mayo	0-5
2nd Round	March 31	Dungarvan	Donegal	2-17	Waterford	0-2
2nd Round	March 31	Enniscorthy (aet)	Fermanagh	0-16	Wexford	0-13
2nd Round	March 31	Dr. Hyde Park	Roscommon	0-9	Meath	0-4
2nd Round	April 7	Omagh	Cork	2-11	Tyrone	1-2
Quarter-final	April 14	Armagh	Armagh	2-7	Monaghan	0-8
Quarter-final	April 14	Ballybofey	Donegal	0-8	Fermanagh	0-7
Quarter-final	April 14	Tralee	Kerry	0-9	Roscommon	0-8
Quarter-final	April 14	Páirc Uí Chaoimh	Cork	2-8	Limerick	0-7
Semi-final	April 21	Croke Park	Kerry	0-12	Armagh	0-11
Semi-final	April 21	Croke Park	Cork	0-10	Donegal	1-6
Final	May 5	Páirc Uí Chaoimh	Kerry	2-11	Cork	0-4
