= Charlie McCarthy (hurler) =

Irish hurler (born 1946)

Personal information
- Native name: Cathal Mac Cárthaigh (Irish)
- Born: 1946 (age 79–80) Tower Street, Cork, Ireland
- Occupations: Painter and decorator
- Height: 5 ft 7 in (170 cm)

Sport
- Sport: Hurling
- Position: Left corner-forward
Club
- Years: Club
- 1963–1981: St Finbarr's
Club titles
- Cork titles: 5
- Munster titles: 4
- All-Ireland Titles: 2
Inter-county*
Years	County	Apps (scores)
1965–1980	Cork	45 (24–149)
Inter-county titles
- Munster titles: 9
- All-Irelands: 5
- NHL: 4
- All Stars: 3
- *Inter County team apps and scores correct as of 01:11, 8 April 2015.

Charles McCarthy (born 1946) is an Irish former hurler who played as a left corner-forward at senior level for the Cork county team.

Born in Tower Street, Cork, McCarthy first played competitive hurling during his schooling at Sullivan's Quay CBS. He arrived on the inter-county scene at the age of sixteen when he first linked up with the Cork minor teams as a dual player, before later joining the under-21 hurling side. He made his senior debut during the 1965 championship. McCarthy immediately became a regular member of the starting fifteen and won five All-Ireland medals, nine Munster medals and four National Hurling League medals. The All-Ireland-winning captain of 1978, he was an All-Ireland runner-up on two occasions.

As a member of the Munster inter-provincial team on a number of occasions, McCarthy won one Railway Cup medal. At club level he is a two-time All-Ireland medallist with St Finbarr's. In addition to this he has also won four Munster medals and five championship medals, after beginning his career with Redmonds.

McCarthy's career tally of 24 goals and 149 points ranks him as Cork's fifth highest championship scorer of all-time.

Throughout his career McCarthy made 45 championship appearances. His retirement came following the conclusion of the 1980 championship.

In retirement from playing McCarthy became involved in team management and coaching. After serving as coach of the Cork minor and senior teams he guided club side St Finbarr's to championship success.

McCarthy is widely regarded as one of the greatest hurlers of his era. During his playing days he won three All-Star awards. He has been repeatedly voted onto teams made up of the sport's greats, including at right corner-forward on the Club Hurling Silver Jubilee Team and the Supreme All-Stars team. McCarthy was also chosen as one of the 125 greatest hurlers of all-time in a 2009 poll.

== Playing career ==
=== Club ===
McCarthy began his club career with Redmonds after being picked to make up the numbers for an under-15 game in 1958.

By 1963 McCarthy had transferred to St Finbarr's and made his senior debut while still a minor.

After losing the championship decider to Glen Rovers in 1964, "the Barr's" were back for a second successive final the following year. University College Cork provided the opposition; however, a youthful St Finbarr's team powered to a 6–8 to 2–6 victory. It was McCarthy's first championship medal. A subsequent 3–12 to 2–3 trouncing of Waterford's Mount Sion gave him a Munster medal.

After surrendering their titles the following year and losing the final to Glen Rovers in 1967, St Finbarr's recovered in 1968. McCarthy collected a second championship medal following a narrow 5–9 to 1–19 defeat of Imokilly.

After an absence of six years St. Finbarr's returned to the top table of Cork hurling once again in 1974. In spite of being regarded as underdogs against Blackrock, Con Roche gave a masterful display in helping "the Barr's" to a 2–17 to 2–14 victory. It was McCarthy's third championship medal. Newmarket-on-Fergus were the opponents in the subsequent provincial decider. A low-scoring 0–7 to 0–3 victory gave McCarthy his second Munster medal; however, the game was tinged with sadness for St Finbarr's as an horrific shin-bone injury brought Bernie Scully's career to an end. The All-Ireland final on 16 March 1976 weekend saw St Finbarr's take on the Fenians of Kilkenny. St Finbarr's ability to get goals at crucial times proved to be the difference in the 3–8 to 1–6 victory. It was McCarthy's first All-Ireland medal.

In 1977 a 1–17 to 1–5 trouncing of north side rivals Glen Rovers gave McCarthy his fourth championship medal. A comfortable 2–8 to 0–6 defeat of Sixmilebridge in a replay after a nerve-wracking draw, saw him win his third Munster medal. He later lined out in the All-Ireland final on 27 March 1978 with Rathnure, the Wexford and Leinster champions, providing the opposition. The first half was a disaster for St Finbarr's as a gale-force wind resulted in the Cork side trailing by 0–8 to 0–1. The second thirty minutes saw "the Barr's" take control with Jimmy Barry-Murphy scoring the deciding goal. A 2–7 to 0–9 victory gave McCarthy a second All-Ireland medal.

1980 saw McCarthy add a fifth championship medal to his collection as Glen Rovers were accounted for on a 1–9 to 2–4 score line. He later picked up a fourth Munster medal as Roscrea fell narrowly by 2–12 to 1–14. On 17 May 1981 St Finbarr's faced Ballyhale Shamrocks in the All-Ireland decider. On that occasion a remarkable seven Fennelly brothers lined out for the Kilkenny club. The sides were level on five occasions during the opening thirty minutes; however, the Shamrocks had the edge. At the full-time whistle Ballyhale were the winners by 1–15 to 1–11.

=== Minor and under-21 ===
McCarthy first played for Cork as a member of the minor hurling team on 8 July 1962. He scored 3–3 on his debut in a 5–10 to 4–3 Munster semi-final defeat of Clare.

In 1963 McCarthy became a dual minor when he turned out with the Cork minor football team as well.

McCarthy experienced his first major successes with Cork in 1964. He began by winning a Munster medal with the footballers following a 4–11 to 0–5 trouncing of Clare. A week later he won a Munster medal with the hurlers following a 2–14 to 2–9 defeat of Tipperary. On 6 September 1964 Cork faced Laois in the All-Ireland decider. McCarthy bagged 3–1 as Cork powered to a remarkable 10–7 to 1–4 victory, collecting an All-Ireland Minor Hurling Championship medal in what was his last game in that grade. Three weeks later McCarthy was back in Croke Park as Cork's minor footballers faced Offaly in the All-Ireland decider. The Rebels nearly brought off a remarkable double, however, they went down to the Leinster champions by 0–15 to 1–11 after having a last-minute goal disallowed.

By 1966 McCarthy was a key member of the Cork under-21 team. He top scored with 1–5 in that year's provincial decider and collected a Munster medal as Cork trounced Limerick by 5–12 to 2–6. On 2 October 1966 Cork faced Wexford in the All-Ireland decider at Nowlan Park, however, a 3–12 to 5–6 draw was the result. The replay took place two weeks later, however, the sides couldn't be separated once again after a 4–9 apiece draw. At the third time of asking Cork finally triumphed, with McCarthy winning an All-Ireland medal following a huge 9–9 to 5–9 victory.

=== Senior ===
==== Early victory ====
McCarthy made his senior championship debut for Cork on 4 July 1965 when he came on as a substitute in a 2–6 apiece Munster semi-final draw with Waterford.

The following year McCarthy was a regular member of the starting fifteen. A 4–9 to 2–9 defeat of Waterford in the provincial decider gave him his first Munster medal. The subsequent All-Ireland final on 4 September 1966 pitted Kilkenny against Cork for the first time in nineteen years. Kilkenny were the favourites, however, a hat-trick of goals from Colm Sheehan gave Cork a merited 3–9 to 1–10 victory over an Eddie Keher-inspired Kilkenny. Not only was it a first championship for Cork in twelve years, but it was McCarthy's first All-Ireland medal.

==== Continued successes ====
After surrendering their titles the following year, Cork had to wait until 1969 for further success. A 3–12 to 1–14 defeat of Wexford in the decider gave McCarthy his first National Hurling League medal. The subsequent provincial decider pitted Cork against reigning champions Tipperary. A 4–6 to 0–9 victory gave Cork a first defeat of Tipp since 1957 while it also gave McCarthy a second Munster medal. Once again this victory paved the way for an All-Ireland showdown with Kilkenny on 7 September 1969, however, the team suffered a setback in the week leading up to the game when midfielder Justin McCarthy broke his leg in a motorcycle accident. The Leesiders got into their stride following an early goal by McCarthy and led by six points coming up to half time when Kilkenny raised a green flag themselves. In spite of this Cork led at the interval and looked a good bet for the victory, particularly after Kilkenny forward Pat Delaney left the field on a stretcher. The Rebels were still to the good coming into the last quarter, however, Kilkenny scored five unanswered points in the last seven minutes to win by 2–15 to 2–9.

In spite of the All-Ireland defeat, Cork regrouped during the 1969–70 National League. It was a successful campaign for the Rebels as an aggregate 5–21 to 6–16 defeat of New York gave McCarthy his second league medal. The subsequent championship campaign saw McCarthy win his third Munster medal as Tipperary were accounted for by 3–10 to 3–8. Cork subsequently faced Wexford in the All-Ireland decider on 6 September 1970. A record 64-point scoreline and eleven goals were produced in a sometimes ill-tempered and disappointing contest. The day belonged to Eddie O'Brien who scored a hat-trick of goals for Cork from his hand as Cork secured a remarkable 6–21 to 5–10 victory. It was McCarthy's second All-Ireland medal.

In 1972 McCarthy enjoyed further success when he won a third league medal following a 3–14 to 2–14 defeat of Limerick. He later added a fourth Munster medal to his collection following a 6–18 to 2–8 thrashing of Clare. Old rivals Kilkenny provided the opposition in the subsequent All-Ireland final on 3 September 1972, a game which is often considered to be one of the classic games of the modern era. Halfway through the second-half Cork were on form and stretched their lead to eight points. Kilkenny's great scoring threat Eddie Keher was deployed closer to goal and finished the game with 2–9. A fifteen-point swing resulted in Kilkenny winning the game by 3–24 to 5–11. McCarthy finished off the year by collecting his first All-Star award.

Championship success eluded Cork over the next few years, however, McCarthy won a fourth league medal in 1974 following a 6–15 to 1–12 defeat of Limerick.

McCarthy won his fifth Munster medal in 1975, as Cork defeated three-in-a-row hopefuls Limerick by 3–14 to 0–12.

==== Three-in-a-row ====
Cork retained the provincial title in 1976 following a 3–15 to 4–5 defeat of Limerick once again. Wexford provided the opposition in the subsequent All-Ireland final on 5 September 1976. Wexford got off to a great start and were 2–2 to no score ahead after just six minutes. Wexford had a two-point lead with ten minutes to go, however, three points from Jimmy Barry-Murphy, two from Pat Moylan and a kicked effort from Ray Cummins gave Cork a 2–21 to 4–11 victory. It was McCarthy's third All-Ireland medal.

Cork faced Clare in the provincial decider in 1977, on a day when armed robbers made away with the takings from the gate of £24,579 during the second half of the game. Clare conceded an early penalty but they fought back to take the lead until a contentious red card for full back Jim Power turned the tide for Cork and they fought on win by 4–15 to 4–10, with McCarthy collecting a sixth winners' medal. The subsequent All-Ireland final on 4 September 1977 was a repeat of the previous year, with Wexford providing the opposition once again. Seánie O'Leary played the game with a broken nose after being hit in the face by a sliotar in the pre-match warm-up, however, he went on to score the decisive goal for Cork as the game entered the last quarter. Martin Coleman brought off a match-winning save from Christy Keogh to foil the Wexford comeback in the dying seconds and a 1–17 to 3–8 victory gave McCarthy his fourth All-Ireland medal. He was later presented with a second successive All-Star.

In 1978 McCarthy was appointed captain as Cork set out to secure an impressive third successive All-Ireland title. The team go off to a good start with McCarthy won an eighth Munster medal following a 0–13 to 0–11 defeat of Clare in a dour provincial decider. This victory paved the way for Cork to take on Kilkenny in the subsequent All-Ireland final. The stakes were high as Cork were attempting to capture a first three in-a-row since 1954. The game, however, was not the classic that many expected. Cork were never really troubled over the course of the seventy minutes and a Jimmy Barry-Murphy goal helped the team to a 1–15 to 2–8 victory over their age-old rivals. This victory gave Cork a third All-Ireland title in succession and gave McCarthy a fifth and final All-Ireland medal. He also had the honour if lifting the Liam MacCarthy Cup before collecting a third All-Star award.

==== Decline ====
The following year Cork had the opportunity of capturing a record-equalling fourth successive All-Ireland. All went to plan as the Rebels secured a fifth consecutive provincial title following a 2–14 to 0–9 defeat of Limerick. It was McCarthy's ninth and final Munster medal. Age and the exertions of the three previous campaigns finally caught up with Cork in the All-Ireland semi-final and a 2–14 to 1–13 defeat by Galway brought the four-in-a-row dream to an end.

McCarthy remained with Cork for one final season in 1980; however, by this stage he was on the fringes of the panel. That year Cork aimed to make history by capturing a record-breaking sixth Munster title in-a-row when the faced Limerick. McCarthy came on as a substitute for Ray Cummins; however, Cork were now in decline and faced a 2–14 to 2–10 defeat.

=== Inter-provincial ===
McCarthy was first chosen on the Munster inter-provincial team in 1972. It was the first of three successive years on the team; however, it was also the first of three consecutive defeats by archrivals Leinster in the decider.

In 1978 McCarthy was appointed Munster captain. After receiving a bye to the final Munster faced Connacht at that stage for the first time in almost a decade. A 0–20 to 1–11 victory gave McCarthy a Railway Cup medal, while he also had the honour of lifting the cup.

== Coaching career ==
=== Cork ===
In 1985 McCarthy was joint coach of the Cork senior team alongside Johnny Clifford. That year Cork claimed the Munster title following a 1–13 to 1–8 defeat of Tipperary before later facing Wexford in the All-Ireland decider on 1 September 1985. A fairly unmemorable game resulted in a 3–9 to 0–12 victory for Cork.

Three years later McCarthy took over as coach of the Cork senior team following the sudden resignation of Johnny Clifford due to ill health. His tenure was a largely unsuccessful one with Cork succumbing to a 2–19 to 1–13 defeat by Tipperary in the provincial decider.

=== St Finbarr's ===
In 1993, McCarthy was coach of the St Finbarr's senior hurling team that reached the final of the county championship. West Cork divisional side and underdogs Carbery provided the opposition; however, they shocked the city-based club by securing a 1–17 apiece draw. The replay was also a close affair with McCarthy's side sneaking a 1–14 to 1–13 victory.

== Career statistics ==
Team	Year	National League			Munster		All-Ireland		Total	
Team	Year	Division	Apps	Score	Apps	Score	Apps	Score	Apps	Score
Cork	1964-65	Division 1A	0	0-00	2	0-02	—		2	0-02
Cork	1965-66	Division 1B	3	0-01	2	2-02	1	0-01	6	2-04
Cork	1966-67	Division 1B	5	3-09	1	0-00	—		6	3-09
Cork	1967-68	Division 1B	5	5-04	3	1-11	—		8	6-15
Cork	1968-69	Division 1B	5	1-16	4	6-12	1	1-06	10	8-34
Cork	1969-70	Division 1B	8	4-30	2	0-08	2	1-15	12	5-53
Cork	1970-71	Division 1A	5	2-16	0	0-00	—		5	2-16
Cork	1971-72	Division 1A	7	10-35	4	3-25	2	1-08	13	14-68
Cork	1972-73	Division 1A	3	1-09	1	0-00	—		4	1-09
Cork	1973-74	Division 1A	9	4-41	1	1-04	—		10	5-45
Cork	1974-75	Division 1A	8	3-32	3	4-07	1	0-02	12	7-41
Cork	1975-76	Division 1A	0	0-00	2	2-05	1	1-03	3	3-08
Cork	1976-77	Division 1A	7	0-08	2	1-10	2	1-07	11	2-25
Cork	1977-78	Division 1A	8	1-25	2	0-07	1	0-07	11	1-39
Cork	1978-79	Division 1A	5	1-14	2	1-09	1	0-03	8	2-26
Cork	1979-80	Division 1A	6	2-07	1	0-00	—		7	2-07
Total			84	37-247	32	21-102	12	5-52	128	63-401

== Honours ==
=== Player ===
St Finbarr's

- All-Ireland Senior Club Hurling Championship (2): 1975, 1978
- Munster Senior Club Hurling Championship (4): 1965, 1974, 1977, 1980
- Cork Senior Club Hurling Championship (5): 1965, 1968, 1974, 1977, 1980

Cork

- All-Ireland Senior Hurling Championship (5): 1966, 1970, 1976, 1977, 1978 (c)
- Munster Senior Hurling Championship (9): 1966, 1969, 1970, 1972, 1975, 1976, 1977, 1978 (c), 1979
- National Hurling League (4): 1968–69, 1969–70, 1971–72, 1973–74
- All-Ireland Under-21 Hurling Championship (1): 1966
- Munster Under-21 Hurling Championship (1): 1966
- All-Ireland Minor Hurling Championship (1): 1964
- Munster Minor Hurling Championship (1): 1964
- Munster Minor Football Championship (1): 1964

Munster

- Railway Cup (1): 1978 (c)

=== Coach ===
St Finbarr's

- Cork Senior Club Hurling Championship (1): 1993

Cork

- All-Ireland Minor Hurling Championship (1): 1985
- Munster Minor Hurling Championship (1): 1985

=== Individual ===
Honours

- The 125 greatest stars of the GAA: No. 83
- Supreme All-Stars Team: Right corner-forward
- All-Ireland Club Hurling Silver Jubilee Team: Right corner-forward
- All-Star (3): 1972, 1977, 1978

Sporting positions
Preceded by Martin O'Doherty	Cork Senior Hurling Captain; 1978	Succeeded by John Horgan
Preceded by Johnny Clifford	Cork Senior Hurling Coach; 1988	Succeeded by Con Roche
Achievements
Preceded by Tony Doran (Leinster)	Railway Cup Hurling Final winning captain 1978	Succeeded by Phil "Fan" larkin (Leinster)
Preceded by Martin O'Doherty (Cork)	All-Ireland Senior Hurling Final winning captain 1978	Succeeded by Ger Fennelly (Kilkenny)
