= 1965 All-Ireland Intermediate Hurling Championship =

Championship Details
- Dates: 11 April – 19 September 1965

All Ireland Champions
- Winners: Cork (1st win)
- Captain: Dave Murphy

All Ireland Runners-up
- Runners-up: London

Provincial Champions
- Munster: Cork
- Leinster: Wexford
- Ulster: Not Played
- Connacht: Not Played

Championship Statistics
- Matches Played: 16
- Total Goals: 119 (7.43 per game)
- Total Points: 239 (14.93 per game)
- Top Scorer: Martin Nolan (5-21); Billy Galligan (1-33)

The 1965 All-Ireland Intermediate Hurling Championship was the fifth staging of the All-Ireland Intermediate Hurling Championship since its establishment by the Gaelic Athletic Association in 1961. The championship ran from 11 April to 19 September 1965.

Wexford entered the championship as the defending champions, however, they were beaten by Cork in the All-Ireland home final.

The All-Ireland final was played on 19 September 1965 at the Athletic Grounds in Cork, between Cork and London, in what was their first ever meeting in the final. Cork won the match by 2-20 to 5-05 to claim their first ever All-Ireland title.

Wexford's Martin Nolan and Cork's Billy Galligan were the championship's joint-top scorers.

== Leinster Intermediate Hurling Championship ==
=== Leinster first round ===
11 April 1965 First round	Wexford	5-11 - 0-01	Wicklow	Gorey Grounds
	M Nolan 0-7, C O'Rafferty 2-1, C Jacob 2-0, N Lacey 1-0, S Sheridan 0-1, L Whelan 0-1, C Hartigan 0-1.		M Jordan 0-1.

=== Leinster quarter-finals ===
11 April 1965 Quarter-final	Offaly	2-09 - 2-06	Laois	St. Brendan's Park
	T Feighery 1-0, JJ Conroy 1-0, S Lambe 0-3, L Weir 0-2, P Mulhaire 0-2, J Dillon 0-1, M Spain 0-1.		J Brophy 1-4, M Carey 1-0, D Conlon 0-1, P Carroll 0-1.	Referee: P Johnston (Kilkenny)

18 April 1965 Quarter-final	Dublin	4-03 - 3-08	Antrim	Croke Park
	S Maher 2-1, C Walsh 1-2, K Crookes 1-0.		D Elliott 2-0, C Barrett 1-0, D McNeill 0-2, B McGarry 0-2, A McCamphill 0-1, P McSheehan 0-1, J Campbell 0-1, S Burns 0-1.	Referee: N Smith (Meath)

2 May 1965 Quarter-final	Meath	7-04 - 2-04	Down	Páirc Tailteann
	C Cunningham 3-3, M McCabe 1-1, T Dixon 1-0, S Whelan 1-0, W Eiffe 1-0.		S Fitzgerald 1-1, S McGivern 1-1, H O'Prey 0-2.	Referee: J Gray (Dublin)

16 May 1965 Quarter-final	Wexford	8-08 - 1-09	Kilkenny	St. Patrick's Park
	L Rochford 3-0, C Jacob 2-0, M Codd 1-2, M Nolan 1-2, P Murphy 1-0, C O'Rafferty 0-3.		P Carroll 0-4, J Byrne 1-0, T Brennan 0-3, W Watson 0-1, P Walsh 0-1.

=== Leinster semi-finals ===
23 May 1965 Semi-final	Meath	2-08 - 3-10	Antrim	Croke Park
	P Christie 1-2, P Collier 1-0, M Mullen 0-2, B Eiffe 0-2, P Martin 0-1, P Darby 0-1.		B McGarry 1-2, P Mullaney 0-4, C Barrett 1-0, D Elliott 1-0, P McShane 0-2, D McNeill 0-1, S McMullan 0-1.

6 June 1965 Semi-final	Wexford	9-11 - 2-09	Offaly	St. Patrick's Park
	M Nolan 2-4, M Codd 2-1, C Jacob 2-1, L Rochford 2-0, P Wilson 1-1, C O'Rafferty 0-3, L Whelan 0-1.		M Spain 1-5, B Maher 1-0, S Lambe 0-3, J Claffey 0-1.

=== Leinster final ===
20 June 1965 Final	Wexford	4-16 - 3-08	Antrim	Croke Park
	M Nolan 2-4, L Rochford 2-0, M Good 0-6, P Wilson 0-2, C Rafferty 0-1, P Murphy 0-1, J Doran 0-1, L Whelan 0-1.		P McShane 1-2, P Mullaney 1-1, B McGarry 1-0, J Richmond 0-2, J Burns 0-1, C Barrett 0-1, E Traynor 0-1.

== Munster Intermediate Hurling Championship ==
=== Munster quarter-finals ===
25 April 1965 Quarter-final	Cork	4-08 - 1-01	Tipperary	Páirc Mac Gearailt
	B Galligan 0-6, J Hogan 1-1, JK Coleman 1-1, D O'Brien 1-0, D O'Keeffe 1-0.		P Nealon 1-0, W O'Grady 0-1.	Referee: S Quaid (Limerick)

25 April 1965 Quarter-final	Waterford	4-09 - 3-05	Clare	Fraher Field
	K O'Ryan 2-0, J Kirwan 0-5, P Fitzgerald 1-0, J Whelan 0-1, J O'Gorman 0-1, G Mason 0-1.		M Keane 2-1, J McCarthy 1-3, J McNamara 0-1.	Referee: P Cronin (Cork)

9 May 1965 Quarter-final	Galway	8-05 - 7-04	Kerry	Gaelic Grounds
	S Devlin 3-2, E Lane 2-1, P Fahy 1-2, M Hoare 1-0, M Boyle 1-0.		M Hennessy 3-0, D Lovett 2-2, D Lucid 1-1, J Barry 1-0, T McCarthy 0-1.

=== Munster semi-finals ===
13 June 1965 Semi-final	Waterford	8-04 - 3-05	Limerick	Fraher Field
	D Mahon 4-0, M Regan 2-0, N Fitzgerald 2-0, J Phelan 0-4.

27 June 1965 Semi-final	Cork	6-14 - 3-04	Galway	Cork Athletic Grounds
	D O'Keeffe 2-3, E Dorney 2-1, B Galligan 0-5, S Barry 0-4, D O'Brien 1-0, JK Coleman 1-0, O O'Keeffe 0-1.		S Devlin 2-2, J Murray 1-1, H Shields 0-1.	Referee: S Quaid (Limerick)

=== Munster final ===
1 August 1965 Final	Waterford	3-02 - 1-15	Cork	Fraher Field
	N Fitzgerald 1-1, K Ryan 1-0, M Power 1-0, J O'Donnell 0-1.		B Galligan 0-7, D O'Brien 1-1, S Barry 0-2, M Murphy 0-2, S Daly 0-1, J Hogan 0-1, JK Coleman 0-1.	Referee: T Foran (Tipperary)

== All-Ireland Intermediate Hurling Championship ==
=== All-Ireland home final ===
15 August 1965 Final	Wexford	2-06 - 3-07	Cork	St. Patrick's Park
	M Nolan 0-4, T Whelan 1-0, L Rochford 1-0, T Doran 0-2.		B Galligan 0-5, B Fitton 1-0, JK Coleman 1-0, M Murphy 1-0, J White 0-1, D O'Brien 0-1.

=== All-Ireland final ===
19 September 1965 Final	Cork	2-20 - 5-05	London	Cork Athletic Grounds
	B Galligan 1-10, D O'Keeffe 1-3, JK Coleman 0-2, D O'Brien 0-2, S Barry-Murphy 0-1, S Barry 0-1, J Hogan 0-1.		M Ryan 1-1, J Curtin 1-0, T Morrison 1-0, M Collins 1-0, T Cleary 1-0, E Murphy 0-3, T Connolly 0-1.	Referee: G Fitzgerald (Limerick)

== Championship statistics ==
=== Top scorers ===
Overall

Rank	Player	Team	Tally	Total
1	Martin Nolan	Wexford	5-21	36
1	Billy Galligan	Cork	1-33	36
3	Lionel Rochford	Wexford	8-00	24
4	Christy Jacob	Wexford	6-01	19
4	Seán Devlin	Galway	5-04	19
