= 1966 All-Ireland Under-21 Hurling Championship =

All-Ireland Under-21 Hurling Championship 1966
Championship Details
- Dates: 27 March – 3 November 1966

All Ireland Champions
- Winners: Cork (1st win)
- Captain: Gerald McCarthy

All Ireland Runners-up
- Runners-up: Wexford

Provincial Champions
- Munster: Cork
- Leinster: Wexford
- Ulster: Antrim
- Connacht: Roscommon

Championship Statistics
- Top Scorer: Charlie McCarthy (9-15); Seánie Barry (5-27)

The 1966 All-Ireland Under-21 Hurling Championship was the third staging of the All-Ireland Under-21 Championship since its establishment by the Gaelic Athletic Association in 1964. The championship began on 27 March 1966 and ended on 3 November 1966

Wexford entered the championship as the defending champions.

The All-Ireland final, the only one to have gone to two replays, was eventually decided on 3 November 1966 at Croke Park in Dublin, between Cork and Wexford, in what was their first ever championship meeting. Cork won the match by 9-09 to 5-09 to claim their first championship title.

Cork's Charlie McCarthy and Seánie Barry were the championship's top scorers.

== Results ==
=== Leinster Under-21 Hurling Championship ===
First round

| 27 March 1966 First round | Offaly | 3-06 - 8-05 | Laois | St. Brendan's Park, Birr |

| 27 March 1966 First round | Westmeath | 4-06 - 2-07 | Dublin | Cusack Park, Mullingar |
| | O Egan 1-5, C Meagher 2-0, M Kennedy 1-0, M Quinn 0-1. | | H Hatton 1-2, T Grealish 1-0, N Kinsella 0-3, J Sweeney 0-2. | Referee: M Spain (Offaly) |

| 3 April 1966 First round | Kildare | 5-13 - 2-04 | Meath | Páirc Mhuire, Maynooth |
| | M Behan 2-1, S Nash 1-2, A Byrne 1-1, O O'Brien 0-3, T Carew 0-2, K Kelly 0-2, J Tobin 0-2. | | T Dickson 1-1, V Shea 1-1, J Keegan 0-2. |

Quarter-finals

| 20 May 1966 Quarter-final | Carlow | 1-04 - 8-11 | Kilkenny | Dr. Cullen Park, Carlow |
| | T Coburn 1-1, J Mitchell 0-2, A Coburn 0-1. | | P Whelan 4-2, K Purcell 2-2, B Harte 1-4, S Muldowney 1-1, S Cooke 0-2. |

Semi-finals

| 12 June 1966 Semi-final | Laois | 6-11 - 2-05 | Kildare | O'Moore Park, Portlaoise |
| | G Doheny 4-0, P Dillon 1-2, T O'Gorman 1-1, B Delaney 0-3, S Bergin 0-2, P Dooley 0-2, P Payne 0-1. | | N Daly 1-1, M O'Brien 1-1, N Behan 0-2, S Nash 0-1. |

| 10 July 1966 Semi-final | Wexford | 6-11 - 2-00 | Kilkenny | Enniscorthy |
| | T Doran 3-0, E Cousins 2-2, M Kinsella 1-1, C Dowdall 0-4, S Barron 0-2, N Gardiner 0-1, W Carley 0-1. | | S Muldowney 1-0, F Cummins 1-0. |

Final

| 8 August 1966 Final | Laois | 2-08 - 7-10 | Wexford | O'Moore Park, Portlaoise |
| | B Delaney 1-1, G Doherty 1-0, P Dillon 0-3, P Dooley 0-2, P O'Mahony 0-2. | | C Dowdall 2-7, E Cousins 2-2, M Rochford 1-0, M Gardiner 1-0, P Doran 1-0, E Furlong 0-1. |

=== Munster Under-21 Hurling Championship ===
Quarter-finals

| 17 April 1966 Quarter-final | Clare | 3-08 - 4-06 | Tipperary | Newmarket-on-Fergus |
| | P Coffey 1-1, M Hanrahan 0-4, J Keaffy 1-0, L Moloney 1-0, V Loftus 0-2, N Pyne 0-1. | | T Brennan 2-0, J Flanagan 1-2, J Ryan 1-1, S Loughnane 0-1, PJ Ryan 0-1, J Walsh 0-1. | Referee: A Higgins (Galway) |

| 1 May 1966 Quarter-final | Kerry | 1-03 - 3-04 | Limerick | Austin Stack Park, Limerick |
| | B Twomey 1-0, C Flaherty 0-3. | | D Foley 2-0, A Dunworth 1-1, E Boland 0-1, E Cregan 0-1, T Moloney 0-1. |

| 15 May 1966 Quarter-final | Cork | 6-10 - 1-02 | Waterford | Páirc Mac Gearailt, Fermoy |
| | C McCarthy 2-3, J McCarthy 2-3, A Flynn 2-0, E O'Brien 0-1, M Kenneally 0-1, G McCarthy 0-1, P Curley 0-1. | | D Mahon 1-0, J Cosgrave 0-1, A Bowman 0-1. | Referee: D O'Connell (Tipperary) |

Semi-finals

| 31 July 1966 Semi-final | Limerick | 2-06 - 1-07 | Tipperary | Gaelic Grounds, Limerick |
| | E Grimes 1-3, P Fogarty 1-0, A Dunworth 0-2, T Hickey 0-1. | | R Buckley 1-0, F Loughnane 0-2, N O'Gorman 0-2, J Flanagan 0-1, PJ Ryan 0-1, J Ryan 0-1. | Referee: S Power (Waterford) |

| 15 August 1966 Semi-final | Galway | 2-02 - 1-17 | Cork | Gaelic Grounds, Limerick |
| | B O'Connor 2-0, B Lally 0-1, T McCarthy 0-1. | | S Barry 0-8, C McCarthy 1-1, G McCarthy 0-2, J McCarthy 0-2, P Riordan 0-2, E O'Brien 0-1, P Curley 0-1. |

Final

| 8 September 1966 Final | Cork | 5-12 - 2-06 | Limerick | Cork Athletic Grounds, Cork |
| | C McCarthy 1-5, J McCarthy 1-4, P Curley 1-2, S Barry 1-1, A Flynn 1-0. | | E Cregan 0-4, A Dunworth 1-0, B Cobbe 1-0, R Bennis 0-1, T Hickey 0-1. |

=== All-Ireland Under-21 Hurling Championship ===
Semi-finals

| 11 September 1966 Semi-final | Antrim | 1-05 - 4-13 | Wexford | Casement Park, Belfast |
| | J McCallin 1-0, M McKearney 0-3, TJ Hill 0-1, M Rogan 0-1. | | J Quigley 2-4, E Cousins 2-1, T Doran 0-4, C Dowdall 0-2, E Kinsella 0-1, S Barron 0-1. | Referee: D Ferguson (Dublin) |

| 11 September 1966 Semi-final | Cork | 11-18 - 5-01 | Roscommon | Cork Athletic Grounds, Cork |
| | E O'Brien 4-3, C McCarthy 2-1, J McCarthy 1-3, S Barry 1-3, P Curley 1-2, A Flynn 1-0, P Hegarty 1-0, J Russell 0-2, G McCarthy 0-2, P Riordan 0-2. | | T Daly 2-0, S Keating 1-1, S Keane 1-0, MJ Keane 1-0. |

Finals

| 2 October 1966 Final | Cork | 3-12 - 5-06 | Wexford | Nowlan Park, Kilkenny |
| | S Barry 2-8, E O'Brien 1-0, J Russell 0-1, P O'Riordan 0-1, C McCarthy 0-1, J McCarthy 0-1. | | M Gardiner 1-2, J Quigley 1-1, T Doran 1-0, E Cousins 1-0, W Murphy (Cork, 1-0 own goal), S Barron 0-1, B Ronan 0-1, C Dowdall 0-1. | Referee: D Nealon (Tipperary) |

| 23 October 1966 Final replay | Cork | 4-09 - 4-09 | Wexford | Gaelic Grounds, Limerick |
| | A Flynn 3-0, C McCarthy 1-2, S Barry 0-5, P Curley 0-1, J McCarthy 0-1. | | T Doran 1-2, C Dowdall 1-1, S Barron 0-4, E Cousins 1-0, P Quigley 1-0, N Rochford 0-1, M Garland 0-1. | Referee: G FitzGerald (Limerick) |

| 3 November 1966 Final second replay | Cork | 9-09 - 5-09 | Wexford | Croke Park, Dublin |
| | C McCarthy 2-2, P Curley 2-1, E O'Brien 2-1, A Flynn 2-0, S Barry 1-2, J McCarthy 0-3. | | S. Barron 3-4, P Quigley 1-0, A Doran 1-0, C Dowdall 0-2, E Cousins 0-1, M Gardiner 0-1, M Jacob 0-1. | Referee: J Martin (Tyrone) |

== Championship statistics ==
=== Top scorers ===
Top scorer overall

| Rank | Player | Team | Tally | Total |
|---|---|---|---|---|
| 1 | Charlie McCarthy | Cork | 9-15 | 42 |
| 1 | Seánie Barry | Cork | 5-27 | 42 |
| 3 | Eddie Cousins | Wexford | 8-06 | 30 |
| 4 | Justin McCarthy | Cork | 4-17 | 29 |
| 5 | Andrew O'Flynn | Cork | 9-00 | 27 |
| 5 | Eddie O'Brien | Cork | 7-06 | 27 |

=== Miscellaneous ===
- Wexford beat Laois to win their third Leinster title in succession.
- Following the first All-Ireland final between Cork and Wexford, referee Donie Nealon had to be escorted from the pitch after dismissing two players, one from each team.
- The All-Ireland final went to a replay for the first time ever. It was also the only occasion that a final went to two replays.
- Cork's All-Ireland victory came a month after their All-Ireland success at senior level. Gerald McCarthy was the captain for both teams.
