= 1969–70 National Hurling League =

39th season of the National Hurling League

League details
- Dates: 12 October 1969 – 20 September 1970
- Teams: 28

League champions
- Winners: Cork (8th win)

Other division winners
- Division 2: Antrim
- Division 3: Louth

The 1969–70 season was the 39th completed season of the National Hurling League.

== Division 1 ==
National Hurling League Division 1
- Season: 1969-70
- Champions: Cork; 8th National League title Captain: Gerald McCarthy
- Matches played: 31
- Top goalscorer: Richie Bennis (3-36)
- Biggest home win: Tipperary 8-10 - 0-2 Laois (2 November 1969)
- Biggest away win: Kilkenny 6-12 - 1-6 Laois (16 November 1969)
- Highest scoring: Limerick 6-12 - 4-5 Galway (1 March 1970)
- All statistics correct as of 1 February 2017.

Cork came into the season as defending champions of the 1968-69 season.

On 20 September 1970, Cork won the title following a 5-21 to 6-16 aggregate win over New York in the final. It was their second league title in succession and their eighth National League title overall.

Limerick's Richie Bennis was the Division 1 top scorer with 3-36.

=== Division 1A table ===
Pos	Team	Pld	W	D	L	Diff	Pts	Notes
1	Tipperary	5	4	0	1	65	8	
2	Offaly	5	4	0	1	13	8	
3	Kilkenny	5	3	0	2	32	6	
4	Wexford	5	3	0	2	5	6	
5	Laois	5	1	0	4	-63	2	
6	Waterford	5	0	0	5	-52	0	

=== Group stage ===
26 October 1969	Wexford	6-9 - 3-5	Laois	Páirc Uí Shíocháin, Gorey
	C Kehoe 2-1, P Murphy 2-0, P Lynch 1-1, M Butler 1-1, M Quigley 0-3, D Bernie 0-2, M Browne 0-1.		T Duggan 1-1, T Keenan 1-0, M Mahon 1-0, D Sheeran 0-2, G Conroy 0-1, O Cuddy 0-1.;	Referee: E Long (Carlow)

2 November 1969	Tipperary	8-10 - 0-2	Laois	MacDonagh Park, Cloughjordan
	J Doyle 2-7, P O'Connor 3-0, N Seymour 1-1, N O'Dwyer 1-1, R Ryan 1-0, D Moloney 0-1.		G Conroy 0-1, E Moore 0-1.

9 November 1969	Waterford	2-7 - 2-11	Offaly	Walsh Park, Waterford
	T Walsh 1-2, D Mahon 1-1, P Enright 0-2, J Greene 0-1, J Kirwan 0-1.		M Mulhaire 1-3, D Molloy 1-2, PJ Whelehan 0-3, D Hanniffy 0-1, W Gorman 0-1, J Flaherty 0-1.	Referee: P Johnston (Kilkenny)

16 November 1969	Laois	1-6 - 6-12	Kilkenny	O'Moore Park, Portlaoise
	O Fennell 1-0, P Dowling 0-2, M Delaney 0-1, D Sheeran 0-1, E Moore 0-1, T Keegan 0-1.		E Keher 1-7, P Delaney 1-2, F Cummins 1-0, L O'Brien 1-0, K Purcell 0-2, M Crotty 0-1.

23 November 1960	Kilkenny	2-16 - 0-11	Wexford	Nowlan Park, Kilkenny
	E Keher 0-9, P Delaney 0-5, J Lynch 1-0, T Murphy 1-0, S Buckley 0-1, K Purcell 0-1.		M Quigley 0-4, P Murphy 0-3, T Doran 0-1, C Kehoe 0-1, P Wilson 0-1, D Bernie 0-1.	Referee: N Dalton (Waterford)

30 November 1969	Tipperary	3-14 - 2-4	Offaly	St. Cronan's Park, Roscrea
	J Doyle 1-8, F Loughnane 1-2, N Seymour 1-1, PJ Ryan 0-1, M Roche 0-1, R Ryan 0-1.		P Molloy 1-1, PJ Whelehan 1-0, B Moylan 0-2, W Gorman 0-1.

8 February 1970	Laois	4-9 - 2-3	Waterford	O'Moore Park, Portlaoise
	F Keenan 2-1, M Delaney 1-3, G Conroy 1-0, T Keenan 0-3, P Dowling 0-2.		P McGovern 1-0, M Connors 1-0, P Enright 0-2, D Ormond 0-1.	Referee: R Sheppard (Carlow)

8 February 1970	Wexford	1-8 - 1-6	Tipperary	O'Kennedy Park, New Ross
	M Quigley 1-1, C Kehoe 0-3, D Quigley 0-1, P Wilson 0-1, J Quigley 0-1, T Doran 0-1.		R Ryan 1-0, J Doyle 0-2, F Loughnane 0-2, M Keating 0-1, J Flanagan 0-1.	Referee: J Hatton (Wicklow)

15 February 1970	Waterford	1-3 - 5-11	Tipperary	Walsh Park, Waterford
	P Coady 1-0, M Hickey 0-1, P Enright 0-1, M McGrath 0-1.		P Byrne 2-2, F Loughnane 1-2, J Flanagan 1-1, R Ryan 1-1, J Doyle 0-3, M Roche 0-1, M Keating 0-1.	Referee: P Cronin (Cork)

1 March 1970	Tipperary	2-12 - 3-7	Kilkenny	Thurles Sportsfield, Thurles
	R Ryan 2-0, J Doyle 0-5, P Byrne 0-3, M Keating 0-2, N O'Dwyer 0-1, J Flanagan 0-1.		E Keher 1-3, J Lynch 1-1, K Purcell 1-0, F Cummins 0-1, P Moran 0-1, W Murphy 0-1.

1 March 1970	Waterford	1-11 - 4-11	Wexford	Fraher Field, Dungarvan
	P Enright 0-6, P O'Grady 1-0, D Mahon 0-2, F Whelan 0-1, S Murphy 0-1, J Greene 0-1.		T Doran 2-0, J Berry 1-3, C Kehoe 1-1, D Quigley 0-4, P Wilson 0-2, J Quigley 0-1.	Referee: E Kelly (Laois)

1 March 1970	Laois	4-4 - 6-7	Offaly	O'Moore Park, Portlaoise

8 March 1970	Offaly	3-8 - 2-3	Wexford	St. Brendan's Park, Birr
	B Moylan 1-3, P Molloy 1-1, G Burke 1-0, J Flaherty 0-2, P Mulhaire 0-1, PJ Whelehan 0-1.		J Berry 1-0, D Quigley 1-0, M Butler 0-1, C Kehoe 0-1, P Wilson 0-1.	Referee: S O'Connor (Limerick)

8 March 1970	Kilkenny	4-10 - 2-9	Waterford	Nowlan Park, Kilkenny
	E Keher 2-5, J Kinsella 1-0, P Moran 1-0, P Delaney 0-2, S Buckley 0-2, P Kavanagh 0-1.		S Murphy 0-4, R Cullinane 1-0, P Walsh 1-0, P Enright 0-3, G O'Neill 0-1, R Cashin 0-1.	Referee: M Rowe (Wexford)

22 March 1970	Offaly	2-14 - 2-9	Kilkenny	St. Brendan's Park, Birr
	P Molloy 1-5, JJ Healion 0-4, M Loughnane 1-0, J Flaherty 0-3, B Moylan 0-1, D Hanniffy 0-1.		S Buckley 2-0, E Keher 0-6, P Moran 0-1, M Lawlor 0-1, P Delaney 0-1.	Referee: S O'Connor (Limerick)

=== Division 1B table ===
Pos	Team	Pld	W	D	L	Diff	Pts	Notes
1	Limerick	4	4	0	0	36	8	
2	Cork	4	3	0	1	20	6	Division 1 champions
3	Galway	4	2	0	2	-9	4	
4	Clare	4	1	0	3	-8	2	
5	Dublin	4	0	0	4	-39	0	

=== Group stage ===
12 October 1969	Galway	2-14 - 1-11	Clare	Pearse Stadium, Galway
	D Coen 1-6, M Greaney 1-0, F Kenny 0-3, J Connolly 0-1, P Fahy 0-1.		L Danagher 0-7, T Ryan 1-0, J McNamara 0-2, M Keane 0-1, M Arthur 0-1.	Referee: W O'Brien (Westmeath)

26 October 1969	Clare	2-6 - 2-15	Limerick	Cusack Park, Ennis
	T Ryan 1-2, J McNamara 1-2, H McCabe 0-2.		T Bluett 2-1, P Bennis 0-7, P Carey 0-3, P O'Brien 0-2, A Dunworth 0-1, R Ryan 0-1.	Referee: D Nealon (Tipperary)

26 October 1969	Galway	4-15 - 3-7	Dublin	Ballinasloe
	J Connolly 0-8, B O'Connor 2-1, D Coen 1-3, P Fahy 1-2, F Kenny 0-1.		J Wallace 2-0, P Wallace 1-0, T Grealish 0-3, E Flynn 0-3, M Wallace 0-1.	Referee: E O'Brien (Westmeath)

9 November 1969	Limerick	3-11 - 1-6	Cork	Gaelic Grounds, Limerick
	R Bennis 1-5, P O'Brien 1-2, T Bluett 1-0, B Hartigan 0-2, P Carey 0-1, Peter Bennis 0-1.		T O'Brien 1-0, J Murphy 0-2, C McCarthy 0-2, E O'Brien 0-1, D Clifford 0-1.	Referee: J Moloney (Tipperary)

16 November 1969	Cork	4-11 - 1-7	Galway	Cork Athletic Grounds, Cork
	C Cullinane 2-3, S Barry 1-3, L McAuliffe 1-0, C McCarthy 0-3, G McCarthy 0-1, R Cummins 0-1.		P Fahy 1-2, P Mitchell 0-1, B O'Connor 0-1, M Greaney 0-1, D Coen 0-1, T Murphy 0-1.	Referee: P Johnston (Kilkenny)

7 December 1969	Dublin	4-7 - 3-13	Limerick	Croke Park, Dublin
	L Lawlor 2-1, D Sheehan 1-1, N Kinsella 1-0, F Flynn 0-2, T Grealish 0-1, F Whelan 0-1, F Murphy 0-1.		R Bennis 0-8, Peter Bennis 1-1, T Bluett 1-1, P Hartigan 1-0, P O'Brien 0-1, B Hartigan 0-1, J O'Donnell 0-1.

8 February 1970	Cork	6-11 - 2-10	Clare	Cork Athletic Grounds, Cork
	C McCarthy 1-6, E O'Brien 2-0, W Walsh 2-0, C Cullinane 1-2, S Barry 0-2, G McCarthy 0-1.		P McNamara 1-3, L Danagher 1-1, P Cronin 0-3, M Arthur 0-1, J McNamara 0-1, T Ryan 0-1.	Referee: G Fitzgerald (Limerick)

15 February 1970	Dublin	4-9 - 3-17	Cork	Croke Park, Dublin
	P Wallace 2-1, J Wallace 0-4, H Dalton 1-0, N Kinsella 1-0, E Davey 0-2, T Grealish 0-1, L Lawlor 0-1.		S Barry 1-2, C Cullinane 1-2, R Cummins 0-5, G McCarthy 1-0, C McCarthy 0-3, J Murphy 0-3, S O'Brien 0-2.

1 March 1970	Clare	4-11 - 0-3	Dublin	Cusack Park, Ennis
	J McNamara 2-1, M Arthur 1-1, P McNamara 1-1, N Casey 0-2, P Cronin 0-2, J Cullinane 0-2, L Danagher 0-1, J Rochfort 0-1.		J Wallace 0-1, H Dalton 0-1, L Lawlor 0-1.

1 March 1970	Limerick	6-12 - 4-5	Galway	Gaelic Grounds, Limerick
	R Bennis 0-11, E Cregan 3-1, PJ Keane 1-0, B Hartigan 1-0, Peter Bennis 1-0.		B O'Connor 2-0, K Kennedy 1-0, F Kenny 1-0, D Coen 0-3, P Fahy 0-2.

=== Play-off ===
5 April 1970 Play-off	Tipperary	3-8 - 0-4	Offaly	O'Moore Park, Portlaoise
	J Flanagan 1-2, M Keating 1-1, N Seymour 1-0, PJ Ryan 0-2, J Hannon 0-1, R Ryan 0-1, T Semple 0-1.		PJ Whelehan 0-2, W Gorman 0-1, P Moylan 0-1.	Referee: R Huggins (Galway)

=== Knock-out stage ===
Semi-finals

12 April 1970 Semi-final	Tipperary	2-7 - 2-10	Cork	Thurles Sportsfield, Thurles
	P Byrne (1-1), N O'Dwyer (1-0), M Keating (0-2), M Roche (0-1), R Ryan (0-1), J Flanagan (0-1), J Doyle (0-1).		C Cullinane (2-1), G McCarthy (0-3), W Walsh (0-1), S Barry (0-1), J Murphy (0-1).	Referee: P Buggy (Kilkenny)

19 April 1970 Semi-final	Limerick	4-15 - 2-8	Offaly	Thurles Sportsfield, Thurles
	R Bennis (2-9), É Grimes (1-0), Peter Bennis (1-0), É Cregan (0-3), A Dunworth (0-3).		P Molloy (1-3), B Moylan (1-0), J Flaherty (0-2), G Burke (0-1), PJ Whelahan (0-1), JJ Healion (0-1).	Referee: M Flaherty (Clare)

Home final

3 May 1970 Home final	Cork	2-17 - 0-7	Limerick	Croke Park, Dublin
	C Cullinane (1-3), C McCarthy (1-2), T Ryan (0-4), R Cummins (0-3), G McCarthy (0-3), E O'Brien (0-1), C Roche (0-1).		R Bennis (0-4), P Bennis (0-2), É Cregan (0-1).	Referee: J Moloney (Tipperary)

Finals

13 September 1970 First leg	Cork	4-11 - 4-8	New York	Gaelic Park, New York City
	C McCarthy (2-5), T Ryan (1-2), R Cummins (1-1), E O'Brien (0-2), G McCarthy (0-1).		S Lakes (2-0), P Dowling (1-2), J Kearney (1-1), P Kirby (0-2), J Firth (0-1), J Curtain (0-1), D O'Brien (0-1).	Attendance: 6,000

20 September 1970 Second leg	New York	2-8 - 1-10	Cork	Gaelic Park, New York City
	M Curtin (1-1), B Kelleher (1-0), J Carney (0-4), T Corbett (0-2), D O'Brien (0-1).		C McCarthy (0-6), D Clifford (1-0), T Ryan (0-2), W Walsh (0-1), G McCarthy (0-1).	Referee: C Foley (Dublin)

=== Scoring statistics ===
Top scorers overall

Rank	Player	Team	Tally	Total	Matches	Average
1	Richie Bennis	Limerick	3-36	45	6	7.50
2	Eddie Keher	Kilkenny	4-30	42	5	8.40
2	Charlie McCarthy	Cork	4-30	42	8	5.25
4	Jimmy Doyle	Tipperary	3-26	35	6	5.83

Top scorers in a single game

Rank	Player	Team	Tally	Total	Opposition
1	Richie Bennis	Limerick	2-09	15	Offaly
2	Jimmy Doyle	Tipperary	2-07	13	Laois
3	Charlie McCarthy	Cork	2-05	11	New York
3	Eddie Keher	Kilkenny	2-05	11	Waterford
3	Jimmy Doyle	Tipperary	1-08	11	Offaly
3	Richie Bennis	Limerick	0-11	11	Galway
7	Éamonn Cregan	Limerick	3-01	10	Galway
7	Eddie Keher	Kilkenny	1-07	10	Laois
9	Charlie Cullinane	Cork	2-03	9	Galway
9	Charlie McCarthy	Cork	1-06	9	Clare
9	Des Coen	Galway	1-06	9	Clare
9	Eddie Keher	Kilkenny	0-09	9	Wexford

== Division 2 ==
National Hurling League Division 2
- Season: 1969-70
- Champions: Antrim
- All statistics correct as of 3 February 2017.

Kildare came into the season as defending champions of the 1968-69 season.

On 10 May 1970, Antrim won the title following a 2-13 to 3-8 win over Kildare in the final. It was their first league title since 1967-68.

=== Division 2A table ===
Pos	Team	Pld	W	D	L	Diff	Pts	Notes
1	Westmeath	2	2	0	0	34	4	
2	Roscommon	2	1	0	1	-10	2	
3	Mayo	2	0	0	2	-35	0	

=== Division 2B table ===
Pos	Team	Pld	W	D	L	Diff	Pts	Notes
1	Antrim	4	3	0	1	13	6	Division 2 champions
2	Down	4	3	0	1	13	6	
3	Meath	4	0	0	4	-26	0	

=== Division 2C table ===
Pos	Team	Pld	W	D	L	Diff	Pts	Notes
1	Kildare	3	3	0	0	33	6	Division 2 runners-up
2	Kerry	3	1	0	2	-1	2	
3	Wicklow	3	1	0	2	-8	2	
4	Carlow	3	1	0	2	-24	2	

=== Play-off ===
5 April 1970 Play-off	Antrim	6-11 - 5-5	Down	Athletic Grounds, Armagh

=== Knock-out stage ===
Semi-final

19 April 1970 Semi-final	Kildare	5-9 - 3-4	Westmeath	O'Connor Park, Tullamore

Final

10 May 1970 Final	Antrim	2-13 - 3-8	Kildare	Croke Park, Dublin
	A McCallin 1-5, E Donnelly 0-4, P McShane 1-0, S Burns 0-2, S Richmond 0-1, W Redmond 0-1.		P Dunny 2-3, M Dwane 1-3, J O'Connell 0-1, J Murphy 0-1.	Referee: C Foley (Dublin)

== Division 3 ==
National Hurling League Division 3
- Season: 1969-70
- Champions: Louth
- All statistics correct as of 3 February 2017.

Louth came into the season as defending champions of the 1968-69 season.

Louth won the title following a 2-3 to 1-4 win over Sligo in the final. It was their fourth league title in succession.

=== Division 3A table ===
Pos	Team	Pld	W	D	L	Diff	Pts	Notes
1	Louth	3	3	0	0	59	6	Division 3 champions
2	Monaghan	3	2	0	1	3	4	
3	Armagh	3	1	0	2	-31	2	
4	Tyrone	3	0	0	3	-31	0	

=== Division 3B table ===
Pos	Team	Pld	W	D	L	Diff	Pts	Notes
1	Sligo	3	3	0	0	17	6	Division 3 runners-up
2	Donegal	3	2	0	1	-9	4	
3	Leitrim	4	0	0	4	-8	0	

=== Knock-out stage ===
Final

8 November 1970 Final	Louth	2-3 - 1-4	Sligo	St Loman's Park, Trim
