= List of Cork Premier Senior Hurling Championship winners =

This is a list of all teams and players who have won the Cork Premier Senior Hurling Championship since its inception in 1887.

== By team ==
The 138 Cork Senior Championships have been won by 19 different teams. Blackrock have won the most titles. The current champions are Sarsfields.

#	Team	Wins	Years won
1	Blackrock	33	1887, 1889, 1891, 1893, 1894, 1895, 1897, 1898, 1903, 1908, 1910, 1911, 1912, 1913, 1920, 1924, 1925, 1927, 1929, 1930, 1931, 1956, 1961, 1971, 1973, 1975, 1978, 1979, 1985, 1999, 2001, 2002, 2020
2	Glen Rovers	28	1934, 1935, 1936, 1937, 1938, 1939, 1940, 1941, 1944, 1945, 1948, 1949, 1950, 1953, 1954, 1958, 1959, 1960, 1962, 1964, 1967, 1969, 1972, 1976, 1989, 2015, 2016, 2026
3	St.Finbarr's	26	1899, 1904, 1905, 1906, 1919, 1922, 1923, 1926, 1932, 1933, 1942, 1943, 1946, 1947, 1955, 1965, 1968, 1974, 1977, 1980, 1981, 1982, 1984, 1988, 1993, 2022
4	Midleton	8	1914, 1916, 1983, 1986, 1987, 1991, 2013, 2021
4	Sarsfields	8	1951, 1957, 2008, 2010, 2012, 2014, 2023, 2025
6	Imokilly	6	1997, 1998, 2017, 2018, 2019, 2024
7	Redmonds	5	1892, 1900, 1901, 1915, 1917
8	Newtownshandrum	4	2000, 2003, 2005, 2009
9	Erin's Own	3	1992, 2006, 2007
9	Dungourney	3	1902, 1907, 1909
9	Avondhu	3	1952, 1966, 1996
9	Na Piarsaigh	3	1990, 1995, 2004
13	University College Cork	2	1963, 1970
13	Carrigtwohill	2	1918, 2011
15	Tower Street	1	1888
15	Aghabullogue	1	1890
15	Ballyhea	1	1896
15	Éire Óg	1	1928
15	Carbery	1	1994

== By year ==
List of Cork Premier Senior Hurling Championship winners
Year	Team	Players	Ref
1887	Cork Nationals		
1888	Tower Street	W Gleeson (c), C Ronayne, M Murphy, J Daly, J Delea, J Connell, J Barrett, J Keegan, J Cullinane, J Donovan, J Crowley, M Cassilly, W Connor, D Bradley, T McCarthy, J Gleeson, S Hegarty, S Donovan, D Halloran, M Donovan, J Kenneally.	
1889	Blackrock		
1890	Aghabullogue	D Lane (c), J Henchion, J Buckley, D Sullivan, T Twomey, J Linehan, D Drew, T Good, D Horgan, C McCarthy, D Cronin, T O'Connor, P Riordan, T Kelleher, D Looney, P Carroll, D Twohig, J Reilly, D Regan, J Sullivan, P Buckley.	
1891	Blackrock	S Hayes (c), D Scannell, J Delea, D Hayes, P Murphy, P Coughlan, P Ahern, P Flaherty, T O'Leary, S Callaghan, D Gould, D Mahony, J Cashman, J Murphy, J Shea, M Carey, J Cremin, J Norberg, T O'Connell, T Tobin, M Cronin.	
1892	Redmonds	B O'Callaghan (c), J Kenneally, M Casserly, J Keegan, W O'Connor, J Leahy, J O'Connor, D Halloran, J Lyons, T Irwin, M Sheehan, J Meade, C O'Callaghan, J Murphy, E O'Connor, M Hegarty, J Conway.	
1893	Blackrock	J Murphy (c), J Norberg, D Scannell, J Delea, P Murphy, J Cashman, P Coughlan, D Hayes, M Cronin, S O'Callaghan, D O'Mahony, M Carey, J Kelleher, D O'Leary, J O'Leary, M Huff, M Murphy.	
1894	Blackrock		
1895	Blackrock	P Coughlan (c), M Cronin, J O'Leary, D O'Leary, J Delea, J Kidney, D Hayes, M Murphy, D Coughlan, M Huff, W Huff, J Canniffe, J Norberg, D Cremin, J Cremin, J O'Brien, P Flaherty.	
1896	Ballyhea	J Murphy, (c), R Mooney, M Flaherty, P Bartley, M Leary, M Flaherty, P Daly, D Higgins, J Roche, P Gorman, T Gorman, M Reidy, W Dwane, D O'Brien, J Walsh, W Fennessy, J Murphy.	
1897	Blackrock	P Coughlan (c), D Coughlan, J Bryan, J Norberg, M Hayes, D Hayes, M Cronin, J Huff, M Huff, J Kidney, M Murphy, J Martin, M Casey, J Delea, J Coughlan.	
1898	Blackrock	P Coughlan (c), D Coughlan, W Huff, M Huff, D Hayes, J Martin, J Norberg, J Hickey, S Riordan, D Cronin, J Delea, J O'Brien.	
1899	St. Finbarr's	J Kelleher, B Moloney, J Delea, P O'Sullivan, J Young (c), J Cantillon, C Foley, M Sexton, R Sheehan, T Murphy, P Conway, F Harrington, C Young, J Harrington, S Sheehan.	
1900	Redmonds		
1901	Redmonds	G Martin, P Cantillon, O Nason, D McGrath, J Leonard, D O'Leary, J Keeffe, D Keeffe, D Madden, T Irwin, S Murphy, M O'Reilly, J O'Leary, J Crowley, M Foster, F Searles, M. J. Halloran.	
1902	Dungourney	J Kelleher (c), J Walsh, J Daly, J Desmond, W Daly, T Mahony, P Fleming, P Leahy, T Lynch, M Lynch, W Ahern, T O'Brien, M O'Shea, R Rohan, W Murphy, J Dooley, W Doyle.	
1903	Blackrock	D Coughlan (c), J Coughlan, T Coughlan, M Brady, M Cotter, John O'Leary, Jermiah O'Leary, D Buckley, A Buckley, D Kidney, J Cleary, S Riordan, W Parfrey, B Mackesy, W Dorney, P Shaw, M Dorney.	
1904	St. Finbarr's		
1905	St. Finbarr's		
1906	St. Finbarr's	D Hurley, J Cotter, E Long, B Young, J Kelly, C Young, C Nolan, P Sullivan, D McCarthy, T Foley, B Moloney, D Harrington, J Harrington, D Sheehan, W Sheehan, D O'Leary, M O'Leary.	
1907	Dungourney	Jamesy Kelleher (c), J Ronayne, J Desmond, J Daly, G Buckley, P Fleming, T Lynch, P Leahy, J O'Shea, M O'Shea, John Kelleher, T Gorde, W Hennessy, T Fleming, M Collins, W Cronin, T Mahony.	
1908	Blackrock	T Coughlan (c), W Parfrey, S Riordan, T Riordan, P. D. Mehigan, D Buckley, A Buckley, P O'Brien, M Buckley, J Delaney, D Kidney, M Kidney, M Dorney, T Moroney, B Murphy, L Flaherty, J Flaherty.	
1909	Dungourney	J Kelleher (c), J Ronayne, J O'Shea, T Lynch, John Kelleher, T Fleming, P Fleming, P Leahy, J Daly, W Daly, M O'Shea, W Hennessy, G Buckley, M Collins, J Desmond, J Cronin, T Mahony.	
1910	Blackrock	T Coughlan (c), A Buckley, A Fitzgerald, B Murphy, D Barry, S Riordan, D Kidney, L Flaherty, W Parfrey, M Dorney, J Deasy, C Ronayne, B Mackesy, P O'Brien, T Riordan, C O'Sullivan, M Kidney.	
1911	Blackrock	T Coughlan (c), B Murphy, D Barry, S Riordan, L Flaherty, J Madden, C Ronayne, P O'Brien, B Mackesy, C O'Sullivan, M Kidney, A Buckley, D Kidney, J Deasy, T Riordan, W Dorney, P Ahern.	
1912	Blackrock	A Buckley (c), B Murphy, A Fitzgerald (goal), D Barry, W Dorney, J Murphy, J Madden, L Flaherty, M Dorney, S Riordan, J Deasy, Billy Mackesy, B O'Brien, M Kidney, C O'Sullivan, T Cox, T Riordan.	
1913	Blackrock	B Murphy (c), D Barry, A Fitzgerald (goal), S Riordan, J Murphy, J Madden, L Flaherty, M Dorney, W Dorney, T Cox, J Deasy, T Riordan, P O'Brien, P McCarthy, A Buckley.	
1914	Midleton	No final.	
1915	Redmonds	C Sheehan (c), J Brett, F Buckley, P Reilly (goal), M Reilly, DJ O'Callaghan, D Buckley, T Riordan, W Heffernan, W Gorman, M O'Keeffe, D O'Keeffe, P Murphy, D Daly, J Creedon.	
1916	Midleton	J O'Connell (c), D O'Gorman, J Grandon, D Twomey, W Twomey, T Twomey, T Deasy, J Desmond, G O'Shea, J Ramsell, B Walsh, D O'Keeffe, J Egan, M Kearney, P Cahill.	
1917	Redmonds	J O'Reilly, D Daly, C Sheehan (c), TJ O'Leary, DJ O'Callaghan, W Gorman, M O'Reilly, D Sullivan, F Buckley, D O'Keeffe, F Hanley, P Creedon, M Lyons, F Harrington, J Heffernan.	
1918	Carrigtwohill	M Fouhy, J Grey, P Cotter, T Walsh, G Cotter, J Mulcahy, J O'Flynn, T O'Leary, B Kennedy (c), J O'Keeffe, N Grey, B Ahern, J Kennedy, J O'Connell, P Whelan.	
1919	St. Finbarr's	T Ahern (goal), J Dorney, M O'Brien, D Coughlan, T Finn (c), Dannix Ring, Denis Ring, J Ronayne, P Canton, C Noonan, J Finn, J Murphy, J Beckett, T Cronin, J Herlihy.	
1920	Blackrock	Mat Murphy (c), S Óg Murphy, M Scannell, M Murphy, Edward O'Connell, P O'Sullivan, A Scannell, T Cox, P Delea, Eugene O'Connell, J Coughlan, E Coughlan, P Ahern, M Leahy, T Donovan.	
1922	St. Finbarr's	No final.	
1923	St. Finbarr's	M O'Brien (c), P Canton, J Dorney, J Barry-Murphy, Dannix Ring, Denis Ring, M O'Connell, T O'Brien, T Finn, J Clarke, J Herlihy, P Ryan, J Higgins, D Coughlan, S Murphy.	
1924	Blackrock	S Óg Murphy (c), J Coughlan (goal), M Scannell, M Murphy, Edward O'Connell, P O'Sullivan, P McCarthy, E Coughlan, Matt Murphy, J Delea, J Cotter, P Ahern, C Connell, M Ahern, Eugene O'Connell.	
1925	Blackrock	J Coughlan (goal), S Óg Murphy (c), M Scannell, M Murphy, Edward O'Connell, P O'Sullivan, P McCarthy, J Hurley, E Coughlan, P Delea, M Murphy, Eugene O'Connell, M Ahern, P Ahern, M Leahy.	
1926	St. Finbarr's	D Coughlan (c), J O'Keeffe, E Lynch, J Barry-Murphy, J Canton, J Clarke, Dannix Ring, T O'Brien, T Lee, M O'Connell, J Kearney, C Halloran, C Cronin, L Kennelly, Denis Ring.	
1927	Blackrock	S Óg Murphy (c), J Coughlan, Edward O'Connell, P McCarthy, W O'Connell, D Barry-Murphy, J Hurley, P Delea, M Ahern, P Ahern, Eugene O'Connell, M Leahy, M Murphy, M Scannell, J Flanagan.	
1928	Éire Óg	Dinny Barry-Murphy (c), J Barry-Murphy, Dermot Barry-Murphy, J Sullivan, J Forde, J Prior, C Cronin, C Donovan, M Murphy, Mat Ryan, J Keane, J Lordan, W Fitzgerald, M Ryan, J Ryan.	
1929	Blackrock	J Coughlan (goal), E O'Connell, W O'Connell, W Donnelly, P McCarthy, P O'Donoghue, E Coughlan, J Hurley, J Egan, M Murphy, P O'Grady, P Delea, M Ahern, P Ahern, M Leahy.	
1930	Blackrock	E Coughlan (c), J Coughlan (goal), E O'Connell, W O'Connell, W Donnelly, G Garrett, P Delea, P O'Donoghue, J Hurley, P O'Grady, M Murphy, M Leahy, M Ahern, P Ahern, J Quirke.	
1931	Blackrock	J Coughlan (goal), E O'Connell, E Coughlan (c), G Garrett, W O'Connell, P O'Donoghue, P O'Grady, W Donnelly, M Ahern, J Quirke, P Delea, M Leahy, P Ahern, D Coughlan, T Delea.	
1932	St. Finbarr's	J Buttimer, E Kingston, D Lynch, D Lehane, J O'Sullivan, M O'Connell, C Cronin, F Murphy, J Lehane, D Stanton, B Stanton, Jeremiah Kenneally, Johnny Kenneally (c).	
1933	St. Finbarr's	Jeremiah Kenneally, Johnny Kenneally (c), B Stanton, J Lehane, D Stanton, C Cronin, P Archer, M O'Connell, D Mahony, J O'Sullivan, D Lehane, J O'Riordan, MJ O'Connor, P Donoghue, J Buttimer.	
1934	Glen Rovers	M Casey; J Corkery, T Kiely, DM Dorgan; J Burke, P O'Connell, P Collins; P Dowling, J Lee (c); W Hyland, C Buckley, P Murphy; P Dorgan, B Barrett, W O'Driscoll. Sub: E Carroll.	
1935	Glen Rovers	M Casey; T Kiely, DM Dorgan, J Corkery; J Young, P Collins, J Burke; P Dowling, J Lee (c); C Buckley, P Murphy, W Hyland; D Moylan, B Barrett, W O'Driscoll.	
1936	Glen Rovers	M Casey; T Kiely, DM Dorgan, W Hyland; P Collins, P O'Connell, J Lynch; J Lee (c), P Dowling; C Buckley, J Buckley, D Moylan; P Murphy, W O'Driscoll, B Barrett.	
1937	Glen Rovers	M Casey; T Kiely, DM Dorgan, P O'Donovan; P O'Connell, P Collins, J Young; J Lee (c), C Buckley; J Buckley, J Lynch, D Moylan; B Barrett, C Tobin, J Burke. Subs: W Hyland, W Hickey.	
1938	Glen Rovers	M Casey; P O'Donovan, DM Dorgan, J Corkery; P O'Connell, P Collins, DJ Buckley; J Lynch, J Lee (c); W Hickey, C Buckley, J Buckley; D Moylan, C Tobin, W Hyland.	
1939	Glen Rovers	M Casey; P O'Donovan, DM Dorgan, DJ Buckley; D Coughlan, P Collins, J Young; C Buckley, J Lynch (c); W Hickey, C Tobin, J Buckley; D Moylan, B Barrett, P Barry.	
1940	Glen Rovers	D Creedon; P Hogan, DM Dorgan, DJ Buckley; D Coughlan, P Collins, J Young; P O'Donovan, C Buckley; W Hickey, J Lynch (c), J Buckley; D Moylan, C Tobin, P Barry. Sub: E Young.	
1941	Glen Rovers	D Creedon; P O'Donovan, P Hogan, DJ Buckley; D Coughlan, J Lynch, J Young; C Buckley (c), C Ring; V Hickey, D McDonnell; J Buckley; D Moylan, C Tobin, P Barry. Sub: C McSwiney.	
1942	St. Finbarr's	J Buttimer; J Murphy, J Horgan, H Atkins; S Condon, M Kennefick, J O'Sullivan; B Murphy, D Cremin; W Beckett, J Morrison, J Barry-Murphy; D McCarthy, T O'Sullivan, D Beckett.	
1943	St. Finbarr's	T Mulcahy; S O'Callaghan, J Horgan (c), J Murphy; W Campbell, M Kennefick, L Moriarty; S Condon, D Cremin; J Barry-Murphy, T O'Sullivan, J O'Sullivan; D McCarthy, T O'Halloran, W Beckett.	
1944	Glen Rovers	D Creedon; DJ Buckley, J Lyons, F Casey; P O'Donovan, J Looney, S O'Brien; J Murphy, C O'Flaherty; J Lynam, C Ring, D Twomey; R Leahy, J Buckley, C Tobin.	
1945	Glen Rovers	D Creedon; J Looney, J Lyons, F Casey; S O'Brien, T Logue, J Young; P O'Donovan (c), C O'Flaherty; J Hartnett, C Ring, J Lynam; J Buckley, C Tobin, D Twomey.	
1946	St. Finbarr's	T Mulcahy; M Lynch, T O'Halloran, S O'Callaghan; P Coughlan (c), J Kenny, S Condon; P Gallagher, D Cremin; D Keating, J Goulding, W Beckett; D McCarthy, A Beckett, D Beckett.	
1947	St. Finbarr's	T Mulcahy; M Lynch, T O'Halloran, S O'Callaghan; B Hanniffy, J Kenny, J O'Sullivan; S Condon, H Goldsboro; J Goulding, P Gallagher, J Sargent; W Beckett, B Murphy, D McCarthy.	
1948	Glen Rovers	D Creedon; DJ Buckley, P Hogan, J Lyons; T Logue, P O'Donovan, J Young (c); C O'Flaherty, C Ring; D O'Donovan, E Monahan, J Hartnett; J Lynam, D Twomey, J Lynch. Sub: J Tierney.	
1949	Glen Rovers	D Creedon (c); DJ Buckley, J Lyons, J Young; T Logue, P O'Donovan, S O'Brien; C Ring, C O'Flaherty; J Lynam, J Hartnett, D O'Donovan; D O'Sullivan, D Twomey, J Lynch.	
1950	Glen Rovers	D Creedon; J Lyons (c), P Hogan, V Twomey; J Nash, P O'Donovan, S O'Brien; J Hartnett, C O'Flaherty; D O'Donovan, C Ring, D Twomey; T Corcoran, J Lynch, D O'Sullivan. Sub: J Twomey	
1951	Sarsfields	S Carroll; D Buckley, T Barry, T Hayes; T Bowman, M O'Connor, D Barry; J Coleman, P O'Leary (c); P Barry, W Dooley, S O'Sullivan; J O'Neill, M Brennan, E Monaghan.	
1952	Avondhu	A Morrissey; M Quinn, P Molloy, E O'Dea; T Galvin (c), D O'Leary, D Leahy; T O'Sullivan, P O'Leary; O McAuliffe, P Dwane, M Fahy; D Murray, J Walsh, J Lyons.	
1953	Glen Rovers	D Creedon; S French, J Lyons, S O'Brien; D O'Donovan, V Twomey, V Dorgan; J Twomey, M Murphy; J Hartnett (c), J Clifford, C Ring; J Lynam, E Ryan, É Goulding.	
1954	Glen Rovers	D Creedon; S French, J Lyons, S O'Brien; D O'Donovan, V Twomey, V Dorgan; J Twomey, PJ Rodgers; É Goulding, C Ring (c), J Hartnett; J Lynam, D O'Sullivan, J Clifford.	
1955	St. Finbarr's	J Cotter; J McKenzie, T O'Shaughnessy (c), MJ O'Driscoll; J O'Grady, M Ryan, S Ó Ceallacháin; M Finn, D O'Driscoll; J O'Sullivan, T Maher, W Walsh; L McGrath, J Ring, T Cronin.	
1956	Blackrock	N O'Connell; D O'Connell, J Brohan, P Lyons; P Philpott, M Cashman (c), M Thompson; S Hearne, J Redmond; J Twomey, F O'Mahony, J Bennett; T Furlong, S Horgan, M Murphy. Sub: EJ O'Sullivan.	
1957	Sarsfields	J Hogan; M Barry, M O'Connor (c), N Looney; M O'Leary, P Dowling, W Walsh; W Barry, D Hurley; J Hayes, T Murphy, M McDonnell; R Lotty, L Dowling, P Barry.	
1958	Glen Rovers	J O'Brien; S French, J Lyons (c), V Twomey; S Kennefick, M McCarthy, B Hackett; J Salmon, É Goulding; B Carroll, N Lynam, J Daly; P Healy, F Daly, M Quane.	
1959	Glen Rovers	J O'Brien; S French, J Lyons (c), G Mulcahy; M McCarthy, J O'Sullivan, B Hackett; N Lynam, É Goulding; B Carroll, M Quane, J Twomey; P Healy, J Young, C Ring, J Daly, P Harte.	
1960	Glen Rovers	J O'Brien; S French, J Lyons, F O'Regan; S Kennefick, J O'Sullivan, M McCarthy; J Salmon, É Goulding; B Carroll, J Twomey (c), J Daly; J Clifford, M Quane, C Ring. Subs: J Lynam, N Young.	
1961	Blackrock	J Dempsey; J Brohan, D Brennan, J O'Brien; T Connolly, M Cashman (c), W Coughlan; R Ryan, M Waters; G O'Leary, J Bennett, B Galligan; J O'Halloran, N O'Connell, M Murphy. Sub: M Murphy (jun).	
1962	Glen Rovers	J O'Brien; F O'Regan (c), L Young, D O'Riordan; J O'Sullivan, M McCarthy, S Kennefick; J Salmon, P Harte; J Daly, M Quane, D Moore; B Carroll, J Young, C Ring. Sub: T Corbett.	
1963	University College Cork	O Harrington; T Conway, D Kiely (c), M McCormack; J O'Byrne, D Kelleher, J Alley; N Gallagher, M Murphy; D Flynn, J O'Halloran, M Mortell; N Phelan, J Blake, D Harnedy. Subs: D Murphy, D Kelleher, T Conway.	
1964	Glen Rovers	F O'Neill; M Lane, L Young, S Kennefick; J O'Sullivan, M Twomey, M McCarthy; J Daly, J Salmon; P Harte, J Young, D Moore; B Carroll, A O'Flynn, C Ring (c).	
1965	St. Finbarr's	J Power; D Murphy, B McKeown, T O'Mullane (c); T Kirby, P Doolan, Tony Maher; G McCarthy, W Doyle; T Connolly, C McCarthy, C Roche; C Cullinane, J McCarthy, M Archer. Sub: B Kenneally.	
1966	Avondhu	T Monaghan; D Murphy, J O'Dea, J Carey; J Hogan, J White, J Browne; J Russell, J Keating; P Behan (c), F Sheedy, L Sheehan; R Ennis, J O'Connell, R Browne. Subs: D Fenton, B Fitzgibbon.	
1967	Glen Rovers	F O'Neill; M Twomey, M Lane, D O'Riordan (c); J O'Sullivan, D Coughlan, S Kennefick; J Daly, S O'Riordan; P Harte, J Young, D Moore; B Carroll, A O'Flynn, M Kenneally.	
1968	St. Finbarr's	J Power (c); M Bohane, M McCormack, D Murphy; S Looney, Tony Maher, T Connolly; G McCarthy, T Kirby; C Roche, M Archer, C McCarthy; C Cullinane, B Scully, B Kenneally. Sub: P Freaney.	
1969	Glen Rovers	F O'Neill; M Twomey, M Lane, D O'Riordan (c); S Kennefick, J O'Sullivan, S O'Riordan; J Daly, D Coughlan; P Harte, J Young T O'Brien; B Carroll, L McAuliffe, M Kenneally.	
1970	University College Cork	J Cremin; M McCarthy (c), P McDonnell, P Crowley; J Walsh, S Looney, J Kelly; M Murphy; J Barrett; T Buckley, M Crotty, H O'Sullivan; N Morgan, R Cummins, W Moore.	
1971	Blackrock	B Hurley; J Horgan (c), B Tobin, P Geary; S Murphy, F Cummins, F Norberg; M Murphy, P Kavanagh; D Collins, J O'Halloran, P Moylan; B Cummins, R Cummins, J Rothwell. Subs: D Prendergast, P Casey.	
1972	Glen Rovers	F O'Neill; D O'Riordan, G O'Riordan, M O'Doherty; J O'Sullivan, P Barry, T O'Brien; M Corbett, D Coughlan (c); P Harte, T Buckley, P O'Doherty; JJ O'Neill, L McAuliffe, J Young. Sub: M Ryan.	
1973	Blackrock	Tim Murphy; J Rothwell, B Tobin, F Norberg; J Russell, J Horgan (c), F Cummins; N Murphy, P Moylan; N O'Keeffe, D Collins, D Prendergast; J O'Halloran, R Cummins, É O Donoghue. Subs: B Cummins, Tony Murphy.	
1974	St. Finbarr's	J Power (c); Tony Maher, S Canty, D Burns; C Roche, B O'Brien, A Butler; G McCarthy, B Wiley; E Fitzpatrick, S Looney, S Gillen; C McCarthy, J Barry-Murphy, J O'Shea. Subs: C Cullinane, B Scully.	
1975	Blackrock	T Murphy; F Norberg, C O'Brien, J Rothwell; D McCurtain, J Horgan, F Cummins; D Collins, P Moylan; T Cashman, B Cummins, P Kavanagh; P Butler, R Cummins, É O Donoghue (c). Sub: D Prendergast.	
1976	Glen Rovers	F O'Neill; P Barry, M O'Doherty (c), T O'Brien; D Clifford, J O'Sullivan, D Coughlan; F O'Sullivan, JJ O'Neill; P Harte, P O'Doherty, P Horgan; V Marshall, T Collins, R Crowley. Subs: L McAuliffe, F Cunningham.	
1977	St. Finbarr's	J Power; D Burns (c), Tony Maher, B Manley; D O'Grady, N Kennefick, J Murphy; J Cremin, G McCarthy; J Allen, J Barry-Murphy, B Wiley; C Ryan, E Fitzpatrick, C McCarthy. Sub: T Butler.	
1978	Blackrock	T Murphy; D McCurtain, C O'Brien, J Horgan; F Norberg, T Cashman, J O'Grady; F Cummins, P Kavanagh; D Collins, É O Donoghue, P Moylan; É O'Sullivan, R Cummins, T Lyons. Sub: D Buckley.	
1979	Blackrock	T Murphy; F Norberg, C O'Brien, J Horgan; D McCurtain, J O'Grady, A Creagh; P Moylan, F Cummins; P Kavanagh, T Lyons, T Cashman; D Buckley, R Cummins, É O Donoghue. Sub: E O'Sullivan.	
1980	St. Finbarr's	G Cunningham; Tony Maher, D O'Grady, J Blake; D Burns, B O'Brien (c), N Kennefick; J Cremin, J Murphy; Tomás Maher, C Ryan, M Kennedy; E Fitzpatrick, J Barry-Murphy, C McCarthy. Sub: G O'Shea.	
1981	St. Finbarr's	G Cunningham; J Hodgins, D O'Grady (c), J Blake; B O'Brien, J Allen, N Kennefick; J Cremin, V Twomey; Tomás Maher, C Ryan, J Meyler; C McCarthy, J Barry-Murphy, E Fitzpatrick. Sub: T Finn.	
1982	St. Finbarr's	G Cunningham; D Burns, D O'Grady, J Blake (c); J Hodgins, J Allen, N Kennefick; J Cremin, W Cashman; C Ryan, Tomás Maher, J Meyler; V Twomey, J Barry-Murphy, T Finn. Sub: B O'Brien	
1983	Midleton	G Power; D Mulcahy, M Boylan, D Crotty; S O'Mahony, S O'Brien, P Hartnett; J Fenton (c), T McCarthy; J Hartnett, C O'Neill, K Hennessy; D Boylan, G Fitzgerald, J Boylan.	
1984	St. Finbarr's	G Cunningham; W Cashman, D O'Grady, J Blake; F Ramsey, N Kennefick, J Hodgins (c); Tomás Maher, J Cremin; J Meyler, D Walsh, C Ryan; É Fitzpatrick, J Barry-Murphy, T Finn. Subs: J Allen, V Twomey.	
1985	Blackrock	J O'Leary; P Maher, R Browne, A Creagh (c); F Cummins, T Cashman, D McCurtain; J Cashman, M Kilcoyne; F Collins, P Kavanagh, P Deasy; F Delaney, É O Donoghue, D Buckley. Sub: E Kavanagh.	
1986	Midleton	G Power; D Mulcahy, J Smith, M Boylan; E Cleary, S O'Brien, P Hartnett; T McCarthy, M Crotty; G Glavin, J Hartnett, J Boylan; D Boylan, G Fitzgerald, K Hennessy (c). S O'Mahony, C O'Neill.	
1987	Midleton	G Power (c); D Mulcahy, M Boylan, S O'Mahony; E Cleary, S O'Brien, P Hartnett; J Hartnett, T McCarthy; J Fenton, V O'Neill, J Boylan; M O'Mahony, G Fitzgerald, K Hennessy. Subs: C O'Neill, M Crotty.	
1988	St. Finbarr's	G Cunningham; W Cashman, P O'Leary, J Blake; N Kennefick, F Ramsey, S O'Leary; B O'Connell, J Cremin; C Ryan, B Cunningham, F O'Brien; M Barry, É Fitzpatrick, T Finn. Subs: J Meyler, J Hodgins, B O'Connell.	
1989	Glen Rovers	D Wallace; T Wall, L Martin, K Keane; K Fitzgibbon, P Horgan, C McGuckin; K McGuckin, D Whitley; J Fitzgibbon, J O'Brien, G Riordan; C Ring; J Buckley, T Mulcahy (c). Subs: M Murphy, P Barry.	
1990	Na Piarsaigh	L Connery; C Connery, J Hannifin, S Guiheen; C Coughlan (c), L Forde, C O'Donovan; T O'Sullivan, R McDonnell; Mickey Mullins, J O'Connor, Mark Mullins; M Dineen, L O'Callaghan, J O'Sullivan. Subs: J Twomey, G Daly.	
1991	Midleton	G Power; M Boylan, D Mulcahy, S O'Brien; P Smith, P Hartnett, D Quirke; J Fenton, J Hartnett; V O'Neill, G Fitzgerald (c), J Boylan; P O'Brien, K Hennessy, M O'Mahony. Sub: C Quirke.	
1992	Erin's Own	R O'Connor; D Long; B O'Shea, C Dillon; T O'Keeffe, T Kelleher, J Dillon; F Dorgan, K Horgan; P Geasley, B Corcoran, J Corcoran, PJ Murphy, B O'Neill, M McNicholl. Subs: C O'Connell.	
1993	St. Finbarr's	G Cunningham; T Doolan, C Ryan, J Kennedy; J Griffin, S O'Leary, N Leonard; F Ramsey, B O'Shea; I O'Mahony, M Quaid, E Griffin; M Ryan, M Barry (c), P Forde. Subs: C Duffy, P O'Leary.	
1994	Carbery	C Wilson; A White, G Ryan, J Wilson; M Holland, T Crowley, J O'Sullivan; C Murphy, D O'Neill; D O'Donoghue, P Kenneally, P Crowley; D O'Connell, G O'Connell, B Harte (c). Sub: M Foley.	
1995	Na Piarsaigh	L Connery; S Óg Ó hAilpín, C Coughlan, C Connery; S Guiheen, L Forde (c), P O'Connor; T O'Sullivan, Mickey Mullins; J O'Connor, Mark Mullins, C Lynch; M O'Sullivan, G Daly, JA Moran.	
1996	Avondhu	S Clifford; N O'Donnell, C Hannon, J McCarthy; J Walsh, P Mulcahy, T Cooney; D Lynch, F McCormack; A Kenny (c), B O'Driscoll, R O'Connell, S Killeen; D Moher, R Sheehan. Subs: W O'Donoghue, J Hayes.	
1997	Imokilly	D Óg Cusack; W O'Riordan, S Barrett, B O'Driscoll (c); M Landers, M Cahill, D O'Sullivan; D Barrett, R Dwane; T McCarthy, M Daly, M Downing; P Cahill, S O'Farrell, J Smiddy. Subs: B Coleman, D Irwin.	
1998	Imokilly	B Rochford; W O'Riordan (c), S Barrett, B O'Driscoll; B Murphy, M Landers, B Fitzgerald; D Barrett, R Dwane; T McCarthy, M Daly, B Coleman; S O'Farrell, J O'Connor, E Fitzgerald. Subs: J Smiddy; M Downing.	
1999	Blackrock	T Barry; W Sherlock, N Keane (c), J Browne, A Ryan; J Cashman, F Ryan, A Cummins; M Harrington, B Hennebry; L Meaney, A Coughlan; B O'Keeffe, A Browne, S Coakley. Subs: D Dempsey, D O'Sullivan.	
2000	Newtownshandrum	P Morrissey; J Griffin, B Mulcahy, J McCarthy; A O'Brien, P Mulcahy, P Noonan; I Kelleher, D Murphy; JP King, M Morrissey; Jerry O'Connor, B Troy, D Mulcahy (c), B O'Connor. Sub: D Riordan	
2001	Blackrock	T Barry; W Sherlock (c), N Keane, J Browne; A Ryan, A Cummins, F Ryan; P Tierney, A Coughlan; B Hennebry, L Meaney, D Gosnell; B O'Keeffe, A Browne, D Cashman. Sub: D Dempsey.	
2002	Blackrock	T Barry; W Sherlock (c), N Keane, J Browne; C Connery, A Cummins, F Ryan; A Coughlan, P Tierney; B Hennebry, L Meaney, D Cashman; J Young, A Browne, B O'Keeffe. Sub. C O'Reilly.	
2003	Newtownshandrum	P Morrissey; J McCarthy (c), B Mulcahy, G O'Mahony; I Kelleher, P Mulcahy, P Noonan; AT O'Brien, Jerry O'Connor; John O'Connor, B O'Connor, D Mulcahy; JP King, J Bowles, M Farrell. Subs: A Naughton, M Morrissey, D Riordan.	
2004	Na Piarsaigh	M O'Sullivan; D Mannix, R O'Byrne, D Byrne; J Gardiner, D Gardiner, Seán Óg Ó hAilpín; R McGregor, M Prendergast (c); C O'Sullivan, Setanta Ó hAilpín, SR O'Sullivan; A Ó hAilpín, C Connery, SP O'Sullivan. Sub: G Shaw.	
2005	Newtownshandrum	P Morrissey; G O'Mahony, B Mulcahy (c), D Gleeson; D Murphy, P Mulcahy, P Noonan; AT O'Brien, Jerry O'Connor; D Mulcahy, B O’Connor, C Naughton; J O'Mahony, JP King, John O'Connor. Subs: J Bowles.	
2006	Erin's Own	S Bowen; P Fenton, P Fitzgerald, S Murphy; S Cronin, C O'Connor, P Kelly; Kieran Murphy, R Carroll; M O’Connor, M Buckley, C Coakley; F Murphy, B Corcoran, E Murphy. Subs: Kilian Murphy; S Kelly; T Kelleher (c).	
2007	Erin's Own	S Bowen; P Fenton, P Fitzgerald, S Murphy; S Cronin, P Kelly, B Clifford; C O'Connor, S Kelly; M O'Connor, K Murphy (c), M Murphy; E Murphy, R Carroll, C Coakley. Sub: I Quinlan.	
2008	Sarsfields	A Kennedy; R Ryan, J Barry, C O’Sullivan; D Kearney, C Leahy, B McCarthy; P Ryan, K Murphy (c); C McCarthy, R Murphy, M Cussen; R O'Driscoll, P Barry, T Óg Murphy. Subs: J Murphy, D Roche.	
2009	Newtownshandrum	W Biggane; J O’Mahony, B Mulcahy, D Gleeson (c); S O’Riordan, P Mulcahy, P Noonan; PJ Copse, C Naughton; R Clifford, Jerry O'Connor, M Bowles; J Coughlan, J Bowles, B O’Connor. Subs: JP King; John O’Connor; J O’Herlihy; E O’Connor.	
2010	Sarsfields	A Kennedy; W Kearney, C Leahy, C O’Sullivan; D Roche, R Ryan, E Martin; D Kearney, E Quigley; C McCarthy, G O’Loughlin, C Duggan; E O’Sullivan, K Murphy, T Óg Murphy (c). Subs: M Cussen, R Duggan, G Grey, R Murphy.	
2011	Carrigtwohill	W McCarthy; M Foley, P O'Sullivan, R Power; C O'Connell, N Furlong, M O'Riordan; D O'Mahony, S Flannery; T Hogan, N McCarthy, L O'Sullivan; S Kidney, R White, M Fitzgerald (c). Subs: S O'Farrell, B Lordan.	
2012	Sarsfields	A Kennedy; D Kenneally, J Barry (c), C O’Sullivan; D Roche, R Ryan, E Martin; E Quigley, D Kearney; C McCarthy, G O'Loughlin, W Kearney; R O'Driscoll, K Murphy, M Cussen. Subs: T Óg Murphy, E O'Sullivan.	
2013	Midleton	T Wallace; A Kearney, P O’Mahony, K Burke; S O’Farrell, F O’Mahony, J Nagle; P Haughney, P Dowling; P O’Shea (c), A Ryan, D Ryan; L O’Farrell, C Lehane, B Hartnett. Sub: C Walsh	
2014	Sarsfields	A Kennedy; W Kearney, C Leahy, C O’Sullivan; D Roche, R Ryan, E Martin; D Kearney, E Quigley; E O’Sullivan, G O’Loughlin, C McCarthy; C Duggan, K Murphy, T Óg Murphy (c). Subs: M Cussen, R Duggan, R O’Driscoll, G Grey, R Murphy.	
2015	Glen Rovers	C Hickey; B Moylan, B Murphy, S McDonnell; G Moylan, D Dooling, G Callanan (c); D Cronin, D Noonan; D Brosnan, P Horgan, D Cunningham; C Dorris, B Phelan, D Busteed. Subs: S Kennefick, G Kennefick.	
2016	Glen Rovers	C Hickey; C Healy, S McDonnell, G Moylan; G Callanan (c), B Moylan, D Dooling; D Cronin, D Noonan; D Brosnan, P Horgan, D Cunningam; C Dorris, C O’Brien, D Busteed. Subs: M Dooley; G Kennefick; E O’Connell.	
2017	Imokilly	D Dalton; B Ó Tuama, C Barry, K Histon; C O’Brien, N O’Leary, J Cronin; M O’Keeffe, G Millerick; Brian Lawton, S Harnedy (c), W Leahy; P O'Sullivan, I Cahill, C Fleming. Subs: D Mangan, B Mulcahy.	
2018	Imokilly	D O’Callaghan; M Russell, C Barry, C Spillane; C O’Brien, N O’Leary, J Cronin; B Cooper, M O’Keeffe; Brian Lawton, S Harnedy (c), S Hegarty; W Leahy, P O'Sullivan, Barry Lawton. Subs: G Millerick; D Dalton; D Mangan.	
2019	Imokilly	D O’Callaghan; K Histon, C Barry, G Millerick; S Hegarty, M Russell, J Cronin; B Cooper, M O’Keeffe; Brian Lawton, S Harnedy, A Spillane; P O’Sullivan, D Dalton, W Leahy. Subs: S O’Regan, J Stack.	
2020	Blackrock	G Connolly; R Laide, G Norberg, J Ryan; S Murphy, N Cashman, Cathal Cormack (jc); D O’Farrell, D Meaney; M O’Keeffe, Ciaran Cormack, J O’Sullivan; A Connolly, S O’Keeffe, M O’Halloran (jc). Subs: T Deasy, J Cashman; R Cotter, A O’Callaghan; K O’Keeffe; E O’Farrell; M O’Halloran.	
2021	Midleton	B Saunderson; S O’Leary-Hayes, L Dineen, E Moloney; C Smyth, T O’Connell, C Walsh; P Haughney, S Quirke; R O’Regan, C Lehane (c), S O’Meara; L O’Farrell, C Beausang, P White. Subs: S O’Farrell, G Manley, A Mulcahy.	
2022	St. Finbarr's	S Hurley; J Burns, C Walsh, E Keane; G O’Connor, D Cahalane, B Hennessy (c); B O’Connor, E Twomey; P Buggy, C Cahalane, B Cunningham; E Finn, B Hayes, J Cahalane. Subs: W Buckley, C Doolan, S Cunningham, C Keane.	
2023	Sarsfields	D McCarthy; Cathal McCarthy, C Leahy, P Leopold; B Murphy, E Murphy, L Elliott; C O’Sullivan (c), D Kearney; D Hogan, Colm McCarthy, A Myers; J O’Connor, C Darcy, S O’Regan. Subs: L Hackett, J Sweeney, B Nodwell.	
2024	Imokilly	E Davis; T Wilk, M Russell, C O’Brien (c); C Joyce, D O'Leary, J Cronin; S Hegarty, B Cooper; Brian Lawton, D Healy, S Harnedy; A Murphy, S Desmond, J Leahy. Subs: K O’Neill, M Kelly, Barry Lawton, W Leahy.	
2025	Sarsfields	B Graham; C O’Sullivan (c), C Roche, D English; C Leahy, B Murphy, L Elliott; K Murphy, D Kearney; J O’Connor, D Hogan, C Darcy; C McCarthy, B O’Flynn, J Sweeney. Subs: S O’Regan, B Nodwell, E Murphy.	
2016	Glen Rovers	C Hickey; A Lynch (c), R Downey, E Varian; L Horgan, E Downey, L Coughlan; R Dunne, C McCarthy; D Brosnan, M Mullins, L Quilligan; S Kennefick, P Horgan, E O’Leary. Subs: B Moylan, D Noonan, A O'Donovan.	

== Individual records ==
Players who have won the most Cork Senior Hurling Championship titles
T	Player	Team	Years won				
T	Player	Team	Years won	14	Christy Ring	Glen Rovers	1941, 1944, 1945, 1948, 1949, 1950, 1953, 1954, 1958, 1959, 1960, 1962, 1964, 1967
10	Paddy O'Donovan	Glen Rovers	1937, 1938, 1939, 1940, 1941, 1944, 1945, 1948, 1949, 1950				
10	John Lyons	Glen Rovers	1944, 1945, 1948, 1949, 1950, 1953, 1954, 1958, 1959, 1960				
9	Jack Lynch	Glen Rovers	1936, 1937, 1938, 1939, 1940, 1941, 1948, 1949, 1950				
9	Dave Creedon	Glen Rovers	1940, 1941, 1944, 1945, 1948, 1949, 1950, 1953, 1954				
