= Barry Murphy =

Barry Murphy may refer to:

== Hurlers ==
- Barry Murphy (Cork hurler) (1888–?), Irish hurler
- Barry Murphy (Clare hurler) (born 1975), Irish hurler
- Barry Murphy (Limerick hurler) (born 1997), Irish hurler

== Other sports ==
- Barry Murphy (footballer, born 1940) (1940–2026), English footballer for Barnsley
- Barry Murphy (footballer, born 1959), Irish footballer
- Barry Murphy (footballer, born 1985) (born 1990), Irish footballer for Shamrock
- Barry Murphy (rugby union) (born 1982), Ireland and Munster rugby player
- Barry Murphy (swimmer) (born 1985), Irish swimmer

== Other people ==
- Barry Murphy (comedian), Irish comedian
- Barry Murphy (politician) (born 1939), former Australian politician

== See also ==
- John Barry-Murphy (1892–1975), Irish hurler for Cork
- Dinny Barry-Murphy (1903–1973), Irish hurler for Cork
- Jimmy Barry-Murphy (born 1954), Irish footballer, hurler, coach
- Brian Barry-Murphy (born 1978), Irish footballer
