= Pat Canton =

Irish hurler

Personal information
- Native name: Pádraig de Cantún (Irish)
- Born: 31 January 1896 Youghal, County Cork, Ireland
- Died: 24 June 1978 (aged 82) The Lough, Cork, Ireland

Sport
- Sport: Hurling
- Position: Midfield
Club
- Years: Club
- St Finbarr's
Club titles
- Cork titles: 3
Inter-county
Years	County	Apps (scores)
1922	Cork	1 (0-00)
Inter-county titles
- Munster titles: 0
- All-Irelands: 0

Patrick Canton (31 January 1896 – 24 June 1978) was an Irish hurler who played for Cork Senior Championship club St Finbarr's. He also had a brief career at senior level with the Cork county team, during which he lined out at midfield.

== Honours ==
St Finbarr's

- Cork Senior Hurling Championship (3): 1919, 1922, 1923
