= Walter Parfrey =

Irish hurler

Personal information
- Born: 29 April 1882 Rutland Street, Cork, Ireland
- Died: 25 July 1918 (aged 36) Blackrock, Cork, Ireland
- Occupation: Blacksmith

Sport
- Sport: Hurling
- Position: Goalkeeper
Club
- Years: Club
- Blackrock
Club titles
- Cork titles: 3
Inter-county*
| Years | County | Apps (scores) |
| 1902-1908 | Cork | 13 |
Inter-county titles
- Munster titles: 2
- All-Irelands: 1
- *Inter County team apps and scores correct as of 00:10, 11 April 2012.

Walter Parfrey (29 April 1882 – 25 July 1918) was an Irish hurler who played in numerous positions, including goalkeeper, with the Cork senior hurling team. He was an All-Ireland Championship winner in 1902.

== Career ==
Parfrey began his hurling career at club level with Blackrock. He played at a time when the club dominated hurling in Cork and won Cork Senior Championship titles in 1903 and 1908.

At inter-county level, Parfrey first played for the Cork senior hurling team on 20 March 1904 in what was the delayed 1902 championship. After missing Cork's Munster Championship triumph, he later won an All-Ireland Championship medal after scoring a goal in Cork's 3-13 to no score defeat of London at the Cork Athletic Grounds. Parfrey later won Munster Championship medals in 1903 and 1907. He played his last game for Cork on 25 October 1908.

Parfrey died at the age of 36 on 25 July 1918.

== Honours ==
Blackrock

- Cork Senior Hurling Championship (2): 1903, 1908, 1910

Cork

- All-Ireland Senior Hurling Championship (1): 1902
- Munster Senior Hurling Championship (2): 1903, 1907
