= Delea =

Delea is a surname. Notable people with the surname include:

- James Delea (1868–1950), Irish hurler
- Kathleen Delea, Irish camogie player
- Paddy Delea (1900–1969), Irish hurler

== See also ==
- Dunlea, surname
- Delea, a village in Zăpodeni Commune, Vaslui County, Romania
