= Dinny Kidney =

Irish hurler

Denis Kidney
Personal information
- Native name: Donncha Ó Duáin (Irish)
- Born: 18 October 1883 Blackrock, Cork, Ireland
- Died: 24 July 1917 (aged 33) Blackrock, Cork, Ireland
- Occupation: Fisherman

Sport
- Sport: Hurling
Club
- Years: Club
- Blackrock
Club titles
- Cork titles: 4
Inter-county
Years	County	Apps (scores)
1903-1908	Cork	9
Inter-county titles
- Munster titles: 2
- All-Irelands: 1

Denis Kidney (18 October 1883 – 24 July 1917) was an Irish hurler. At club level he played with Blackrock and was also a member of the Cork senior hurling team.

== Career ==
Kidney first came to prominence at club level with Blackrock. After establishing himself on the club's senior team, he went on to win four County Championship titles between 1903 and 1911. Kidney's performances at club level saw him being selected for the Cork senior hurling team and he made his first appearance in the 1903 Munster CHampionship. He ended his debut season with an All-Ireland winners' medal after lining out against London in the All-Ireland final. Kidney's last game for Cork was a defeat by Kilkenny in the 1907 All-Ireland final. By that stage he had also won two Munster Championship medals.

== Personal life ==
Kidney was born into a fishing family in Blackrock and spent his entire working life as a fisherman. His brother, John Kidney, was an All-Ireland medal-winner with Cork in 1894.

Kidney died at the Cork District Hospital on 24 July 1917. He had been in ill health for a short period with tuberculosis.

== Honours ==
Blackrock

- Cork Senior Hurling Championship: 1903, 1908, 1910, 1911

Cork

- All-Ireland Senior Hurling Championship: 1903
- Munster Senior Hurling Championship: 1903, 1907
