= Maurice O'Shea (hurler) =

Irish hurler

Personal information
- Native name: Muiris Ó Sé (Irish)
- Born: 27 December 1879 Dungourney, County Cork, Ireland
- Died: 14 August 1911 (aged 31) Lough Carrig Bay, County Cork, Ireland
- Occupation: Horse dealer

Sport
- Sport: Hurling
- Position: Forward
Club
- Years: Club
- Dungourney
Club titles
- Cork titles: 3
Inter-county
Years	County	Apps (scores)
1902-1909	Cork	8
Inter-county titles
- Munster titles: 0
- All-Irelands: 1

Maurice O'Shea (27 December 1879 – 14 August 1911) was an Irish hurler who played as a forward with the Cork senior hurling team. He was an All-Ireland Championship winner in 1902.

== Career ==
O'Shea began his hurling career at club level with Dungourney in East Cork. He played at a time when the club enjoyed its most successful era ever and won Cork Senior Championship titles in 1902, 1907 and 1909.

At inter-county level, O'Shea first played for the Cork senior hurling team on 9 August 1903 in what was the delayed 1902 championship. After missing Cork's Munster Championship triumph, he later won an All-Ireland Championship medal after a 3-13 to no score defeat of London at the Cork Athletic Grounds. O'Shea later lined with Cork on a number of occasions before playing his last game on 29 August 1909.

O'Shea died in a drowning accident at Lough Carrig Bay in Cork Harbour on 14 August 1911.

== Honours ==
Dungourney

- Cork Senior Hurling Championship (3): 1902, 1907, 1909

Cork

- All-Ireland Senior Hurling Championship (1): 1902
