= Dan Coughlan (St Finbarr's hurler) =

Irish hurler

Personal information
- Native name: Dónall Ó Cochláin (Irish)

Sport
- Sport: Hurling
- Position: Left wing-back
Club
- Years: Club
- St Finbarr's
Club titles
- Cork titles: 4
Inter-county*
Years	County	Apps (scores)
1916–1919	Cork	2 (0-00)
Inter-county titles
- Munster titles: 1
- All-Irelands: 1
- *Inter County team apps and scores correct as of 16:34, 7 April 2018.

Dan Coughlan was an Irish hurler. His championship career at senior level with the Cork county team spanned four seasons from 1916 until 1919.

Born in Cork, Coughlan first played competitive hurling with the St Finbarr's club. During a successful period for the club, he won four county championship medals.

Coughlan made his debut with the Cork senior team during the 1916 championship and went on to become a regular member of the team at various times over the following few years. During this time he won his sole All-Ireland medal. Coughlan also won one Munster medal.

== Honours ==
St Finbarr's

- Cork Senior Hurling Championship (1): 1919, 1922, 1923, 1926 (c)

Cork

- All-Ireland Senior Hurling Championship (1): 1919
- Munster Senior Hurling Championship (1): 1919
