= John Clarke (hurler) =

Irish hurler

Personal information
- Native name: Seán Ó Cléirigh (Irish)
- Born: 1899 Cork, Ireland
- Died: 13 November 1962 (aged 63) Cork, Ireland
- Occupation: Watchman

Sport
- Sport: Hurling
- Position: Centre-forward
Club
- Years: Club
- St Finbarr's
Club titles
- Cork titles: 4
Inter-county
Years	County	Apps (scores)
1920-1923	Cork	2 (1-00)
Inter-county titles
- Munster titles: 1
- All-Irelands: 0

John Clarke (1899 – 13 November 1962) was an Irish hurler who played for Cork Senior Championship club St Finbarr's. He also had a brief career with the Cork senior hurling team, during which he lined out at centre-forward.

== Honours ==
St Finbarr's

- Cork Senior Hurling Championship (4): 1919, 1922, 1923, 1926

Cork

- Munster Senior Hurling Championship (1): 1920
