= Maurice O'Shea =

Maurice O'Shea may refer to:

- Maurice O'Shea (hurler)
- Maurice O'Shea (winemaker)
