= Ronayne =

Ronayne may refer to:

== Surname ==
Ronayne is a surname. Notable people with the surname include:

- Chris Ronayne, American politician from Ohio; county executive of current Cuyahoga County, Ohio
- John Ronayne (1931-2009), Irish violinist
- Jim Ronayne (1877–1936), Irish hurler
- Jim Ronayne (born 1959), Gaelic footballer
- Joseph Philip Ronayne (1822–1876), Irish civil engineer
- Shane Ronayne, Gaelic football manager
- Thomas Ronayne, (1849–1925), Irish & New Zealand engineer; NZR General Manager

== Given name ==
Ronayne is a masculine given name:

- Patrick Ronayne Cleburne (1828–1864), Irish and later American soldier
- Ronayne Marsh-Brown (born 1984), Guyanese footballer
