= John Dorney (hurler) =

Irish hurler

Personal information
- Native name: Seán Ó Doirinne (Irish)
- Born: 8 January 1887 Cove Street, Cork, Ireland
- Died: 15 May 1956 (aged 69) St. Finbarr's Hospital, Cork, Ireland
- Occupation: Cabinet maker

Sport
- Sport: Hurling
- Position: Centre-back
Club
- Years: Club
- St Finbarr's
Club titles
- Cork titles: 3
Inter-county
Years	County	Apps (scores)
1922-1923	Cork	1 (0-00)
Inter-county titles
- Munster titles: 0
- All-Irelands: 0

John Dorney (8 January 1887 – 15 May 1956) was an Irish hurler who played for Cork Senior Championship club St Finbarr's. He also had a brief career at senior level with the Cork county team, during which he usually lined out at centre-back.

== Honours ==
St Finbarr's

- Cork Senior Hurling Championship (3): 1919, 1922, 1923

Cork

- Munster Junior Hurling Championship (1): 1912

Sporting positions
Preceded by	Cork Senior Hurling Captain; 1922	Succeeded by Dannix Ring
