= Denis Ring =

Irish hurler

Personal information
- Native name: Donncha Ó Rinn (Irish)
- Nickname: Denny
- Born: 28 October 1897 Denroches Cross, Cork, Ireland
- Died: 26 May 1977 (aged 79) St. Finbarr's Hospital, Cork, Ireland
- Occupation: Bootmaker

Sport
- Sport: Hurling
- Position: Left wing-back
Club
- Years: Club
- St Finbarr's
Club titles
- Cork titles: 4
Inter-county
Years	County	Apps (scores)
1920-1921	Cork	1 (0-00)
Inter-county titles
- Munster titles: 1
- All-Irelands: 0

Denis Ring (28 October 1897 – 26 May 1977) was an Irish hurler who played for Cork Senior Championship club St Finbarr's. He also had a brief career with the Cork senior hurling team, with whom he was an All-Ireland Championship runner-up alongside his brother Dannix in 1920.

== Honours ==
St Finbarr's

- Cork Senior Hurling Championship (4): 1919, 1922, 1923, 1926

Cork

- Munster Senior Hurling Championship (1): 1920
