= Christy Young =

Irish hurler

Personal information
- Native name: Criostóir de Siún (Irish)
- Nickname: Christy
- Born: 24 December 1878 The Lough, Cork, Ireland
- Died: 6 October 1915 (aged 36) The Lough, Cork, Ireland

Sport
- Sport: Hurling
- Position: Goalkeeper
Club
- Years: Club
- St Finbarr's
Club titles
- Cork titles: 3
Inter-county
Years	County	Apps (scores)
1901-1906	Cork	18
Inter-county titles
- Munster titles: 4
- All-Irelands: 1

Christopher Stephen Young (24 December 1878 – 6 October 1915) was an Irish hurler. His championship career at senior level with the Cork county team lasted from 1901 until 1906.

== Life ==
Raised in the Lough area of Cork, Young was one of eight children born to the former Mary Daly and Peter Young. After a brief education he joined many of his other siblings and worked as a milk vendor. Young first played competitive hurling with the St Finbarr's club. Throughout his club career he won three county senior championship medals.

Young made his first appearance for the Cork senior team in August 1902 in what was the first round of the 1901 championship. He became a regular member of the team and played as a forward and as a goalkeeper at different times during his inter-county career. Young won his only All-Ireland medal in 1902, however, he made no appearance in the final but had played in the earlier rounds of the championship. He also won four Munster medals. Young played his last game for Cork in August 1907.

Young died from myelitis on 6 October 1915.

== Honours ==
St Finbarr's

- Cork Senior Hurling Championship (3): 1899, 1904, 1906

Cork

- All-Ireland Senior Hurling Championship (1): 1902
- Munster Senior Hurling Championship (4): 1901, 1902, 1904, 1905

Sporting positions
Preceded by Jamesy Kelleher	Cork Senior Hurling Captain; 1905-1906	Succeeded by Jamesy Kelleher
