= William Dorney =

Irish hurler

William "Bill Bill" Dorney
Personal information
- Native name: Liam Ó Doirinne (Irish)
- Nickname: Bill Bill
- Born: 21 April 1890 Blackrock, County Cork, Ireland
- Died: Unknown
- Occupation: Fisherman

Sport
- Sport: Hurling
- Position: Corner-back
Club
- Years: Club
- Blackrock
Inter-county*
Years	County	Apps (scores)
1911-1914	Cork	5 (0-00)
Inter-county titles
- Munster titles: 0
- All-Irelands: 0
- *Inter County team apps and scores correct as of 18:55, 8 August 2013.

William "Bill Bill" Dorney (born 21 April 1890) was an Irish hurler who played as a corner-back for the Cork senior team.

Born in Blackrock, County Cork, Dorney first arrived on the inter-county scene at the age of twenty when he joined the Cork senior team for the 1911 championship. Dorney went on to play a bit part for Cork but enjoyed little success in terms of silverware. He was an All-Ireland runner-up on one occasion.

At club level he won numerous championship medals with Blackrock.

Throughout his career Dorney made just five championship appearances. His retirement came following Cork's victory over Galway in the 1914 championship.

Dorney's brother, Mick, also played with Cork.

In retirement from playing, Dorney became involved in team management and coaching. As selector to the Cork senior team, he helped guide the team to the All-Ireland title in 1931.
