= 1892 Cork Senior Hurling Championship =

Annual hurling competition season

- Champions: Redmonds (1st title); Bill O'Callaghan (captain)
- Runners-up: Blackrock; Denis Scannell (captain)

The 1892 Cork Senior Hurling Championship was the sixth staging of the Cork Senior Hurling Championship since its establishment by the Cork County Board in 1887.

Blackrock were the defending champions.

On 17 July 1892, Redmonds won the championship following a 2–4 to 0–5 defeat of Blackrock in the final. This was their first championship title.

== Results ==
Final

On 17 July 1892 Final	Redmonds	2-04 – 0-05	Blackrock	Cork Park

== Championship statistics ==
=== Miscellaneous ===
- Redmonds and Blackrock face each-other in the final for the first time.
- Redmonds win their first title.
- Following their county championship success, Redmonds represent Cork in the inter-county championship. They become the second Cork team to win the All-Ireland title.
