= Maurice O'Brien (Cork hurler) =

Irish hurler

Personal information
- Native name: Muiris Ó Briain (Irish)

Sport
- Sport: Hurling
- Position: Midfield
Club
- Years: Club
- St Finbarr's
Club titles
- Cork titles: 4
Inter-county*
Years	County	Apps (scores)
1919	Cork	1 (0-00)
Inter-county titles
- Munster titles: 1
- All-Irelands: 1
- *Inter County team apps and scores correct as of 16:14, 7 April 2018.

Maurice O'Brien was an Irish hurler. His championship career at senior level with the Cork county team lasted just one season in 1919.

Born in Cork, O'Brien first played competitive hurling with the St Finbarr's club. During a successful period for the club, he won four county championship medals.

O'Brien was added to the Cork senior panel for the 1919 championship. It was a successful season for the team, with O'Brien winning his sole All-Ireland medal that year. He also won one Munster medal.

== Honours ==
St Finbarr's

- Cork Senior Hurling Championship (1): 1919, 1922, 1923 (c), 1926

Cork

- All-Ireland Senior Hurling Championship (1): 1919
- Munster Senior Hurling Championship (1): 1919
