= Eugene O'Connell (hurler) =

Irish hurler

Personal information
- Native name: Eoghan Ó Conaill (Irish)
- Born: 3 October 1894 Ballintemple, Cork, Ireland
- Died: 2 February 1956 (aged 61) Ballintemple, Cork, Ireland
- Occupation: Factory worker

Sport
- Sport: Hurling
- Position: Centre-forward
Club
- Years: Club
- Blackrock
Inter-county
Years	County	Apps (scores)
1919-1926	Cork	3 (0-00)
Inter-county titles
- Munster titles: 2
- All-Irelands: 2

Eugene O'Connell (3 October 1894 – 2 February 1956) was an Irish hurler. His championship career with the Cork senior team lasted from 1919 until 1926.
