= Miah Lynch =

Republic of Ireland footballer

Personal information
- Full name: Jeremiah Lynch
- Date of birth: 1907
- Place of birth: Cork
- Date of death: 25 August 1987 (aged 79–80)
- Position: Full back

Senior career*
Years	Team	Apps	(Gls)
1933-35	Cork Bohemians F.C.		

International career
1934	Ireland	1	(0)
- * Club domestic league appearances and goals

Miah Lynch (died 25 August 1987) was an Ireland international footballer.

== International career ==
In February 1934, Lynch made his only appearance for Ireland in a 4–4 draw with Belgium in Dublin.

He was reinstated to play GAA in 1944 having earlier in his teens played with Geraldines GAA Miah won 2 Cork County Senior Hurling Championship medals with St Finbarr's in 1946 and '47
