= Seánie Kennefick =

Irish hurler

Personal information
- Native name: Seán Ciniféic (Irish)
- Born: 1937 Blackpool, Cork, Ireland
- Height: 5 ft 7 in (170 cm)

Sport
- Sport: Hurling
- Position: Right wing-back
Club
- Years: Club
- 1954-1972: Glen Rovers
Club titles
- Cork titles: 7
- Munster titles: 1
Inter-county
Years	County	Apps (scores)
1961-1964	Cork	2 (0-00)
Inter-county titles
- Munster titles: 0
- All-Irelands: 0
- NHL: 0

Seán Kennefick (born 1937) is an Irish retired hurler. At club level he played with Glen Rovers and at inter-county level with the Cork senior hurling team.

== Career ==
Kennefick had his first successes at club level with Glen Rovers as a member of the intermediate team. He won Cork IHC medals in 1954 and 1956, before progressing to the club's senior team. In a 15-year senior career, Kennefick won seven Cork SHC medals, including one as team captain in 1967. He also won a Munster Club SHC medal in 1964, after a 3-07 to 1-07 win over Mount Sion in the final. At inter-county level, Kennefick joined the Cork senior hurling team during the 1961–62 National League campaign and made a number of appearances over the following few seasons.

== Honours ==
Glen Rovers

- Munster Senior Club Hurling Championship: 1964
- Cork Senior Hurling Championship: 1958, 1959, 1960, 1962, 1964, 1967 (c), 1969
- Cork Intermediate Hurling Championship: 1954, 1956
