= Shane Murphy (hurler) =

Irish hurler

Personal information
- Born: 19 August 1983 (age 43) Glounthaune, County Cork, Ireland
- Height: 5 ft 10 in (178 cm)

Sport
- Sport: Hurling
- Position: Right Corner Back
Club
- Years: Club
- 1999-present: Erin's Own
Club titles
- Cork titles: 2
Inter-county
- Years: County
- 2007-present: Cork
Inter-county titles
- Munster titles: 0
- All-Irelands: 0
- NHL: 0
- All Stars: 0

Shane Murphy (born 19 August 1983 in Glounthaune, County Cork, Ireland) is an Irish hurler. He plays hurling with his local club Erin's Own and is a substitute Right Corner Back for the Cork Inter-County Team. He made his debut for Cork in 2007 in a game against Waterford.

== Honours ==
- Cork Senior Hurling Championships: 2
  - 2006, 2007
- Cork Under-21 Hurling Championships: 2
  - 2002, 2004
- All-Ireland Minor Hurling Championships: 1
  - 2001
