= William Daly (hurler) =

Irish hurler

Personal information
- Native name: Liam Ó Dálaigh (Irish)
- Born: 3 September 1877 Dungourney, County Cork, Ireland
- Died: Unknown
- Occupation: Farmer

Sport
- Sport: Hurling
- Position: Forward
Club
- Years: Club
- 1900s-1910s: Dungourney
Club titles
- Cork titles: 3
Inter-county*
Years	County	Apps (scores)
1902-1909	Cork	9
Inter-county titles
- Munster titles: 1
- All-Irelands: 1
- *Inter County team apps and scores correct as of 00:10, 11 April 2012.

William Daly (born 3 September 1877) was an Irish hurler who played as a forward for the Cork senior team.

Daly made his first appearance for the team during the 1902 championship and was a regular member of the starting fifteen for that season. He made a brief return to the team for the 1909 championship. During that time he won a set of All-Ireland and Munster winners' medals.

At club level Daly was a three-time county championship medalist with Dungourney.
