= Seán O'Brien (Cork hurler) =

Irish hurler

Personal information
- Native name: Seán Ó Briain (Irish)
- Born: 9 February 1924 Killeagh, Ireland
- Died: 20 July 2001 (aged 77)
- Occupation: School inspector
- Height: 5 ft 8 in (173 cm)

Sport
- Sport: Hurling
- Position: Half-back
Club
- Years: Club
- 1944-1962: Glen Rovers
Inter-county
Years	County	Apps (scores)
1946 - 1954	Cork	10
Inter-county titles
- Munster titles: 3
- All-Irelands: 3

Seán O'Brien (born 1924) was an Irish sportsperson. He played hurling with his local club Glen Rovers and was a member of the Cork senior inter-county team in the 1950s.

== Playing career ==
=== Club ===
O'Brien played his club hurling with the famous Glen Rovers team on the north side of Cork city and enjoyed much success. He won numerous county championship titles with the club throughout the 1940s and 1950s.

=== Inter-county ===
O'Brien's inter-county career was a short one, however, he enjoyed much success. After a period in the wilderness the Cork team bounced back in 1952 with O'Brien capturing a Munster winners' medal following a defeat of three-in-a-row All-Ireland champions Tipperary in the provincial decider. Dublin provided the opposition in the subsequent All-Ireland final, however ‘the Dubs’ were completely outclassed by Cork on that occasion. In spite of only leading by three points at half-time Cork won by 2-14 to 0-7 and picked up an All-Ireland winners' medal. O'Brien was also a member of the 1946 and 1954 All-Ireland winning teams.

== Honours ==
Cork

- All-Ireland Senior Hurling Championship: 1946, 1952, 1954
- Munster Senior Hurling Championship: 1946, 1952, 1954
