= Barry Murphy (Cork hurler) =

Irish hurler

Personal information
- Native name: Barra Ó Murchú (Irish)
- Born: 19 April 1888 Cloughduv, County Cork, Ireland
- Died: Unknown
- Occupation: Farmer

Sport
- Sport: Hurling
- Position: Goalkeeper
Club
- Years: Club
- Cloughduv
Club titles
- Cork titles: 0
Inter-county*
Years	County	Apps (scores)
1914-1919	Cork	7 (0-00)
Inter-county titles
- Munster titles: 1
- All-Irelands: 0
- *Inter County team apps and scores correct as of 19:35, 25 January 2013.

Barry Murphy (born 19 April 1888) was an Irish hurler who played as a goalkeeper for the Cork senior team.

Murphy made his first appearance for the team during the 1914 championship and was a regular member of the starting fifteen at various times until his retirement after the 1919 championship. During that time he won one Munster medal. Murphy was an All-Ireland runner-up on one occasion.

At club level Murphy was a one-time county intermediate championship medalist with Cloughduv.

His brothers, Dinny and John Barry-Murphy, also played with Cork.
