= Larry Flaherty =

Irish hurler

Personal information
- Native name: Labhrás Ó Flatharta (Irish)
- Born: 26 May 1882 Blackrock, Cork, Ireland
- Died: 5 January 1979 (aged 96) South Douglas Road, Cork, Ireland
- Occupation: Taxi driver

Sport
- Sport: Hurling
- Position: Right wing-back
Club
- Years: Club
- Blackrock
Club titles
- Cork titles: 5
Inter-county
Years	County	Apps (scores)
1903-1917	Cork	22
Inter-county titles
- Munster titles: 2
- All-Irelands: 1

Laurence Flaherty (26 May 1882 – 5 January 1979) was an Irish sportsperson. He played hurling with his local club Blackrock and was a member of the Cork senior inter-county team from 1903 until 1915. Flaherty won an All-Ireland winners' medal and two Munster winners' medals with Cork. At the time of his death he was the oldest surviving All-Ireland medal winner.
