= Jimmy Ramsell =

Irish hurler

Personal information
- Native name: Séamus Ramsaill (Irish)
- Born: 22 November 1892 Midleton, County Cork, Ireland
- Died: 3 January 1962 (aged 69) Midleton, County Cork, Ireland
- Occupation: General labourer

Sport
- Sport: Hurling
- Position: Left wing-back
Club
- Years: Club
- Midleton
Club titles
- Cork titles: 2
Inter-county*
Years	County	Apps (scores)
1914-1917	Cork	7 (0-00)
Inter-county titles
- Munster titles: 1
- All-Irelands: 0
- *Inter County team apps and scores correct as of 20:00, 25 January 2013.

James Ramsell (22 November 1892 – 3 January 1962) was an Irish hurler who played as a left wing-back for the Cork senior team.

Ramsell made his first appearance for the team during the 1914 championship and was a regular member of the starting fifteen until his retirement after the 1917 championship. During that time he won one Munster medal. Murphy was an All-Ireland runner-up on one occasion.

At club level Ramsell was a two-time county club championship medal winner with Midleton.
