= Tom Mahony =

Irish hurler

Personal information
- Born: 26 February 1877 Youghal, County Cork, Ireland
- Died: 5 January 1971 (aged 93) Youghal, County Cork, Ireland
- Occupation: Farm labourer

Sport
- Sport: Hurling
- Position: Forward
Club
- Years: Club
- 1890s-1910s: Dungourney
Inter-county
- Years: County
- 1902-1907: Cork
Inter-county titles
- Munster titles: 2
- All-Irelands: 1

Thomas Mahony (1877–1971) was an Irish sportsperson. He played hurling with his local club Dungourney and was a member of the Cork senior inter-county team from 1902 until 1907.

== Playing career ==
=== Club ===
Mahony played his hurling with his local club in Dungourney and enjoyed some success. He won a county senior championship title in 1902. Two more county winners’ medals followed for Mahony in 1907 and 1909.

=== Inter-county ===
Mahony first came to prominence on the inter-county scene with Cork as part of the Dungourney selection in 1902. That year he lined out in his first provincial decider with Limerick providing the opposition. The Shannonsiders failed to test Mahony and at full-time Cork were the champions by 2-9 to 1-5. It was Mahony’s first Munster title. After a draw and a replay with Dublin in the ‘home’ final, Cork qualified for an All-Ireland final meeting with London. The game turned into an absolute rout as Cork powered to a 3-13 to 0-0 victory. It was a fitting opening to the new Cork Athletic Grounds and, more importantly, the victory gave Mahony an All-Ireland winners’ medal.

Mahony was dropped from the Cork team for a number of years as Dungourney lost control of the team selection. He was back with Cork in 1907 as the team qualified for the Munster decider once again. Tipperary, the reigning All-Ireland champions, provided the opposition on that occasion and a close game ensued. After a stern test Cork won the game by 1-6 to 1-4 and Mahony added a second Munster winners’ medal to his collection. Cork subsequently qualified for an All-Ireland final showdown with Kilkenny. In one of the best exhibitions of hurling seen to date a close game developed between these great rivals. Jimmy Kelly scored three goals for Kilkenny, the first within seconds of the start. Cork went on several goal hunts at the end of the game, however, Jack Anthony got the winning point for Kilkenny. At the full-time whistle Mahony’s side were defeated by 3-12 to 4-8.

== Sporting ancestry ==
Mahony's grandson, Seánie O'Leary, followed in his grandfather's footsteps as a hurler of renown. He played with his local club in Youghal and won All-Ireland titles with Cork as part of the three-in-a-row team in the 1970s. Mahony's granddaughter, Mary O'Leary, won All Ireland medals in 1978, 1980, 1982 (when her last-gasp point secured victory for Cork) and 1983. She was named B&I Star of the Year award in 1982. Mahony's great-grandson, Tomás O'Leary, captained Cork to the All-Ireland minor title. He played rugby with Munster, London Irish, Montpellier and earned 24 caps for Ireland during his career, before retiring from the sport in 2017.

== Honours ==
=== Dungourney ===
- Cork Senior Hurling Championship:
  - Winner (3): 1902, 1907, 1909

=== Cork ===
- All-Ireland Senior Hurling Championship:
  - Winner (1): 1902
- Munster Senior Hurling Championship:
  - Winner (2): 1902, 1907

== Sources ==
- Corry, Eoghan, The GAA Book of Lists (Hodder Headline Ireland, 2005).
- Cronin, Jim, A Rebel Hundred: Cork's 100 All-Ireland Titles.
- Donegan, Des, The Complete Handbook of Gaelic Games (DBA Publications Limited, 2005).
- Moran, Mary (2011). A Game of Our Own: The History of Camogie. Dublin, Ireland: Cumann Camógaíochta. p. 460.
