= Andrew O'Flynn =

Irish hurler

Personal information
- Native name: Aindriú Ó Floinn (Irish)
- Born: 1946 (age 79–80) Blackpool, Cork, Ireland
- Height: 6 ft 3 in (191 cm)

Sport
- Sport: Hurling
- Position: Full-forward
Club
- Years: Club
- Glen Rovers
Club titles
- Cork titles: 3
- Munster titles: 1
Inter-county
| Years | County | Apps (scores) |
| 1967-1968 | Cork | 2 (1-0) |
Inter-county titles
- Munster titles: 0
- All-Irelands: 0
- NHL: 0

Andrew O'Flynn (born 1946) is an Irish retired hurler who played as a full-forward for the Cork senior team.

O'Flynn joined the team during the 1967 championship and was a regular member of the starting fifteen until he left the panel after the 1968 championship. During that time he enjoyed little success.

At club level O'Flynn was a one-time Munster medalist with Glen Rovers. In addition to this he also won three county club championship medals.

== Playing career ==
=== Club ===
O'Flynn played his club hurling with Glen Rovers and enjoyed much success during a brief career.

In 1964 he was just out of the minor grade when he lined out for the Glen in the championship decider. A 3-12 to 2-7 defeat of south side rivals St. Finbarr's gave O'Flynn his first championship medal. Glen Rovers later qualified for the inaugural provincial club decider. A 3-7 to 1-7 defeat of Mount Sion gave O'Flynn a Munster medal.

Three years later in 1967 Glen Rovers and St. Finbarr's faced off in the county decider once again. A 3-9 to 1-9 victory gave O'Flynn a second championship medal.

Once again the Glen failed to secure back-to-back titles, however, O'Flynn lined out in a third decider in 1969. A 4-16 to 1-13 defeat of UCC gave him a third championship medal.

=== Inter-county ===
O'Flynn first came to prominence on the inter-county scene as a member of the Cork minor hurling team and in 1964 enjoyed the ultimate success in that grade. A 2-14 to 2-9 defeat of Tipperary gave him a Munster. Cork later overwhelmed Laois in a unique All-Ireland decider. A remarkable 10-7 to 1-4 score line gave Cork the title and gave O'Flynn an All-Ireland medal in what was his last game in that grade.

By 1966 O'Flynn was a key member of the Cork under-21 team. He won a Munster medal that year as Cork trounced Limerick by 5-12 to 2-6 in the provincial decider. The subsequent All-Ireland final ended in a draw as Wexford recorded 5-6 to Cork's 3-12. The replay also ended all square - 4-9 apiece. At the third time of asking Cork emerged victorious with a huge tally of 9-9 to 5-9. This victory gave Cork their first All-Ireland title in this grade and gave O'Flynn an All-Ireland Under-21 Hurling Championship medal.

O'Flynn made his senior debut in a Munster semi-final defeat by Waterford in 1967. His two years on the team ended without any success as Cork failed to emerge from the provincial series.

== Honours ==
=== Team ===
Glen Rovers

- Munster Senior Club Hurling Championship (1): 1964
- Cork Senior Club Hurling Championship (3): 1964, 1967, 1969

Cork

- All-Ireland Under-21 Hurling Championship (1): 1966
- Munster Under-21 Hurling Championship (1): 1966
- All-Ireland Minor Hurling Championship (1): 1964
- Munster Minor Hurling Championship (1): 1964
