= Willie Cashman =

Irish hurler

Personal information
- Native name: Liam Ó Ciosáin (Irish)
- Born: 1961 (age 64–65) Aghada, County Cork, Ireland

Sport
- Sport: Hurling
- Position: Midfield
Clubs
- Years: Club
- Aghada → Imokilly; St Finbarr's
Club titles
- Cork titles: 3
Inter-county*
Years	County	Apps (scores)
1982-1989	Cork	1 (0-00)
Inter-county titles
- Munster titles: 0
- All-Irelands: 0
- NHL: 0
- All Stars: 0
- *Inter County team apps and scores correct as of 22:32, 25 February 2022.

William Cashman (born 1961) is an Irish former hurler. At club level he played with Aghada, Imokilly and St Finbarr's, while he was also a member of the Cork senior hurling team. Cashman usually lined out at corner-back or wing-back.

== Career ==
Cashman first played Gaelic games with the Aghada club. After progressing from the juvenile and underage ranks, he went on to win a number of East Cork titles as a dual player. He simultaneously enjoyed success as a schoolboy with St. Colman's College by winning an All-Ireland Colleges Championship in 1977. Cashman also earned selection on the Imokilly divisional hurling team before transferring to the St Finbarr's club in 1982. He won a Cork SHC title in his debut season before claiming further titles in 1984 and 1988. Cashman first came to prominence on the inter-county scene as a member of the Cork minor hurling team that won consecutive All-Ireland MHC titles in 1978 and 1979. His tenure with the under-21 side also yielded success after beating Galway in the 1982 All-Ireland under-21 final. After playing in a number of National League games for the senior team earlier in the decade, Cashman made his Munster SHC debut in 1989.

== Honours ==
St Colman's College

- Croke Cup: 1977
- Harty Cup: 1977

Aghada

- East Cork Junior A Hurling Championship: 1980
- East Cork Junior A Football Championship: 1980, 1981

St Finbarr's

- Cork Senior Hurling Championship: 1982, 1984, 1988

Cork

- All-Ireland Under-21 Hurling Championship: 1982
- Munster Under-21 Hurling Championship: 1982
- All-Ireland Minor Hurling Championship: 1978, 1979
- Munster Minor Hurling Championship: 1977, 1978, 1979
