= Christy Connery =

Irish hurler

Personal information
- Native name: Críostóir Ó Conaire (Irish)
- Born: 20 October 1967 (age 59) Cork, Ireland
- Occupation: Insurance representative
- Height: 5 ft 10 in (178 cm)

Sport
- Sport: Hurling
- Position: Right corner-back
Club
- Years: Club
- Na Piarsaigh
Club titles
- Cork titles: 3
Inter-county*
Years	County	Apps (scores)
1986-1992	Cork	3 (0-00)
Inter-county titles
- Munster titles: 1
- All-Irelands: 1
- NHL: 0
- All Stars: 0
- *Inter County team apps and scores correct as of 20:22, 26 August 2012.

Christopher J. Connery (born 20 October 1967) is an Irish former hurler who played as a right corner-back for the Cork senior team.

Born in Cork, Connery first played competitive hurling during his schooling at the North Monastery. He arrived on the inter-county scene at the age of seventeen when he first linked up with the Cork minor team before later joining the under-21 side. He made his senior debut during the 1987 championship and became a regular member of the team over the next few seasons. Connery won one All-Ireland medal as a non-playing substitute.

At club level Connery is a three-time county club championship medalist with Na Piarsaigh.

Throughout his career Connery made 3 championship appearances. His retirement came following the conclusion of the 1991 championship.

== Playing career ==
=== Club ===
After enjoying championship success in the under-21 grade with Na Piarsaigh, Connery quickly joined the senior team. After losing the 1987 championship decider to Midleton, the club qualified for the final again in 1990. Southside kingpins St. Finbarr's provided the opposition, however, the game ended in a tie.

The replay was also a close affair, however, a narrow 2-7 to 1-8 victory gave Connery a Cork Senior Hurling Championship medal.[1]

Na Piarsaigh failed to retain their title, while the club also faced defeat at the hands of Erin's Own in 1992. Three years later Connery lined out in a fourth championship decider as North Cork minnows Ballyhea provided the opposition. A 1-12 to 3-1 victory gave Mullins a second championship medal.

Almost a decade would pass before Na Piarsaigh qualified for the championship decider in 2004. By now Connery was a veteran on the team after enjoying a club career that spanned three decades. A 0-17 to 0-10 defeat of Cloyne gave him a third championship medal.

=== Inter-county ===
Connery first played for Cork as a member of the minor hurling team on 15 May 1985 in a 1-12 to 1-8 Munster semi-final defeat of Limerick. A subsequent 1-13 to 1-8 defeat of Tipperary secured a centenary year Munster medal for Connery. Wexford provided the opposition in the subsequent All-Ireland decider on 1 September 1985. Connery collected an All-Ireland Minor Hurling Championship medal following a 3-10 to 0-12 victory.

Three years later Connery was a key member of the Cork under-21 team. He won a Munster medal that year following a 4-12 to 1-7 defeat of Limerick. Cork subsequently faced Kilkenny in the All-Ireland decider on 11 September 1988. Played in St. Brendan's Park, Birr to commemorate the centenary of the very first senior All-Ireland final being played there, Cork triumphed by 4-12 to 1-5, with Connery winning an All-Ireland Under-21 Hurling Championship medal.

Connery joined the Cork senior panel in 1987 but didn't make his championship debut until 17 July 1988 in a 2-19 to 1-13 Munster final defeat by Tipperary.

In 1990 Cork bounced back after a period in decline, however, Connery's appearances were limited. In spite of this he won a Munster medal as a non-playing substitute following a 4-16 to 2-14 defeat of Tipperary. The subsequent All-Ireland final on 2 September 1990 pitted Cork against Galway for the second time in four years. Galway were once again the red-hot favourites and justified this tag by going seven points ahead in the opening thirty-five minutes thanks to a masterful display by Joe Cooney. Cork fought back with an equally expert display by captain Tomás Mulcahy. The game was effectively decided on an incident which occurred midway through the second half when Cork goalkeeper Ger Cunningham blocked a point-blank shot from Martin Naughton with his nose. The umpires gave no 65-metre free, even though he clearly deflected it out wide. Cork went on to win a high-scoring and open game of hurling by 5–15 to 2–21. In spite of not playing any part in the game Connery collected an All-Ireland medal as a non-playing substitute.

Achievements
Preceded by Gussie Ryan (Limerick)	All-Ireland Under-21 Hurling Final winning captain 1988	Succeeded by Declan Ryan (Tipperary)
