= Noel O'Connell =

Irish hurler

Personal information
- Native name: Nollaig Ó Conaill (Irish)
- Born: Daniel Noel O'Connell; 31 December 1932 Coachford, County Cork, Irish Free State
- Died: 23 December 2009 (aged 76) Coachford, County Cork, Ireland

Sport
- Sport: Hurling
- Position: Full-forward
Clubs
- Years: Club
- Aghabullogue → Muskerry; Macroom; Blackrock
Club titles
- Cork titles: 2
Inter-county
Years	County	Apps (scores)
1958–1959	Cork	2 (1-00)
Inter-county titles
- Munster titles: 0
- All-Irelands: 0
- NHL: 0

Daniel Noel O'Connell (31 December 1932 – 23 December 2009) was an Irish hurler. At club level he played with Aghabullogue and Blackrock, and at inter-county levels with the Cork senior hurling team.

== Career ==
O'Connell first played hurling as a schoolboy in the School Shield competition with Coachford National School. His performances in this grade later resulted in him being selected as goalkeeper for various Aghabullogue juvenile teams. He also lined out as a Gaelic footballer with Macroom and won a Cork MFC title in 1948.

After returning to Aghabullogue in 1949, O'Connell was in goal when the club won that year's Mid Cork JHC title. It was the first of four such titles in a six-year period. O'Connell transferred to the Blackrock after Aghabullogue received a 12-month suspension in 1956. It was a successful decision as the club won their first Cork SHC title in 25 years that year. O'Connell won a second SHC title in 1961 after a defeat of Avondhu.

O'Connell's performances at club level resulted in a call-up to the Cork senior hurling team. He lined out at right corner-forward when Cork were beaten by Waterford in the 1959 Munster final. O'Connell ended his hurling career back with the Aghabullogue club where he served as a selector and administrator.

== Death ==
O'Connell died on 23 December 2009, at the age of 76.

== Honours ==
Aghabullogue

- Mid Cork Junior Hurling Championship: 1949, 1952, 1954, 1955

Macroom

- Cork Minor Football Championship: 1948

Blackrock

- Cork Senior Hurling Championship: 1956, 1961
