= John Blake (hurler) =

Irish hurler, born 1957

Personal information
- Native name: Seán de Bláca (Irish)
- Born: 1 November 1957 (age 69) Mallow, Cork, Ireland
- Occupation: Insurance representative
- Height: 5 ft 8 in (173 cm)

Sport
- Sport: Hurling
- Position: Left corner-back
Club
- Years: Club
- St Finbarr's
Club titles
- Cork titles: 5
- Munster titles: 1
- All-Ireland Titles: 0
Inter-county*
Years	County	Apps (scores)
1981-1985	Cork	9 (0-00)
Inter-county titles
- Munster titles: 3
- All-Irelands: 1
- NHL: 1
- All Stars: 0
- *Inter County team apps and scores correct as of 18:32, 4 December 2013.

John Blake (born 1 November 1957) is an Irish former hurler who played as a left corner back at senior level for the Cork county team.

Born in Mallow, County Cork, Blake first arrived on the inter-county scene at the age of twenty-three when he first linked up with the Cork senior team as a member of the extended panel for the 1981 championship. Blake later became a regular member of the starting fifteen over the next few years and won three Munster medals. He won one All-Ireland medal as an unused substitute, as well as being an All-Ireland runner-up on two occasions.

At club level Blake won one Munster medal and five championship medals with St Finbarr's.

== Honours ==
St Finbarr's

- Munster Senior Club Hurling Championship (1): 1980
- Cork Senior Hurling Championship (6): 1980, 1981, 1982, 1984, 1988, 1993

Cork

- All-Ireland Senior Hurling Championship (1): 1984 (sub)
- Munster Senior Hurling Championship (3): 1982, 1984, 1985
