= Tim Murphy (hurler) =

Irish hurler and manager

Personal information
- Native name: Tadhg Ó Murchú (Irish)
- Born: Blackrock, County Cork

Sport
- Sport: Hurling
- Position: Goalkeeper
Club
- Years: Club
- 1970s-1980s: Blackrock
Club titles
- Cork titles: 4
- Munster titles: 4
- All-Ireland Titles: 2
Inter-county
Years	County	Apps (scores)
1980	Cork	2 (0-0)
Inter-county titles
- Munster titles: 0
- All-Irelands: 0
- NHL: 1

Tim Murphy (born 1953 in Blackrock, County Cork) is a former Irish hurling manager and former player. He played hurling with his local club Blackrock and succeeded Martin Coleman as goalkeeper on the Cork senior inter-county team for one season in 1980. He was subsequently replaced by Ger Cunningham.

Murphy later served as coach of the Blackrock senior hurling team.
