= Ger O'Leary =

Irish hurler

Personal information
- Native name: Gearóid Ó Laoire (Irish)
- Born: 1942 (age 83–84) Blackrock, Cork, Ireland
- Height: 5 ft 10 in (178 cm)

Sport
- Sport: Hurling
- Position: Right wing-back
Club
- Years: Club
- Blackrock
Club titles
- Cork titles: 1
Inter-county
| Years | County | Apps (scores) |
| 1966-1968 | Cork | 2 (0-00) |
Inter-county titles
- Munster titles: 1
- All-Irelands: 1
- NHL: 0

Gerald O'Leary (born 1942) is a retired Irish hurler. He played hurling at club level with Blackrock and at inter-county level as a member of the Cork senior hurling team.

== Honours ==
Blackrock

- Cork Senior Hurling Championship (1): 1961

Cork

- All-Ireland Senior Hurling Championship (1): 1966
- Munster Senior Hurling Championship (1): 1966
