= John Kidney (hurler) =

Irish hurler

Personal information
- Native name: Seán Ó Duáin (Irish)
- Born: 1872 Blackrock, County Cork, Ireland
- Died: Unknown
- Occupation: Fisherman

Sport
- Sport: Hurling
- Position: Left half-back
Club
- Years: Club
- Blackrock
Inter-county
| Years | County | Apps (scores) |
| 1891–1897 | Cork | 6 |
Inter-county titles
- Munster titles: 1
- All-Irelands: 1

John Kidney (born 30 June 1871) was an Irish hurler who played as a left half-back for the Cork senior team.

Kidney made his first appearance for the team during the 1891 championship and was a regular member of the starting seventeen until his retirement after the 1897 championship. During that time he won one All-Ireland medal and one Munster medal.

At club level Kidney won multiple county club championship medalist with Blackrock.

His brother, Dinny Kidney, was also an All-Ireland medalist with Cork.
