= Mick McCarthy (Cork hurler) =

Irish hurler

Personal information
- Native name: Mícheál Mac Cárthaigh (Irish)
- Born: 1938 (age 87–88) Cork, Ireland
- Height: 5 ft 10 in (178 cm)

Sport
- Sport: Hurling
- Position: Full-back
Club
- Years: Club
- Glen Rovers
Club titles
- Cork titles: 5
Inter-county
Years	County	Apps (scores)
1956-1964	Cork	8 (0-00)
Inter-county titles
- Munster titles: 1
- All-Irelands: 0
- NHL: 0

Michael McCarthy (born 1938) is an Irish former hurler who played at club level with Glen Rovers and at inter-county level with the Cork senior hurling team. He usually lined out as a full-back or centre-back.

== Playing career ==
McCarthy first made an impression as a schoolboy hurler at the North Monastery, winning a Harty Cup title in 1955, before joining the Glen Rovers club. He made his first appearance with the club's senior team in 1956 and went on to win five Cork SHC titles between 1958 and 1964. McCarthy first appeared on the inter-county scene as the centre-back on the Cork minor hurling team in 1956. Such was his ability that he was also drafted onto the Cork senior hurling team that year and won a Munster Championship medal after appearing at centre-back in the opening round defeat of Waterford. McCarthy made a number of sporadic appearances for the team over the next few seasons and was even team captain in 1963.

== Honours ==
North Monastery

- Harty Cup: 1955

Cork

- Munster Senior Hurling Championship: 1956

Sporting positions
Preceded by Mick Cashman	Cork senior hurling team captain 1963	Succeeded by John O'Halloran
