= Mossy O'Connor =

Irish hurler

Personal information
- Native name: Muiris Ó Conchúir (Irish)
- Born: 15 July 1921 Affane, County Waterford, Ireland
- Died: 13 April 1983 (aged 61) Cappoquin, County Waterford, Ireland
- Occupation: Army officer

Sport
- Sport: Hurling
- Position: Centre-back
Clubs
- Years: Club
- Affane; Cappoquin; Sarsfields
Club titles
- Cork titles: 2
Inter-county*
Years	County	Apps (scores)
1951-1953	Cork	2 (0-00)
Inter-county titles
- Munster titles: 2
- All-Irelands: 2
- NHL: 1
- *Inter County team apps and scores correct as of 15:45, 4 April 2023.

Maurice O'Connor (15 July 1921 – 13 April 1983) was an Irish hurler. At club level he played with Affane, Cappoquin and Sarsfields, while at inter-county level he lined out with the Cork senior hurling team.

== Career ==
O'Connor first played hurling and Gaelic football with sister clubs Cappoquin and Affane. He won Waterford JHC titles with the former in 1944 and 1948. O'Connor transferred to the Sarsfields club in Cork in 1949 and was part of the club's first ever Cork SHC triumph in 1951. He captained Sarsfields to their second title in 1957.

O'Connor first appeared on the inter-county scene as a member of the Cork senior hurling team that won the 1952–53 National League title. He made his championship debut in Cork's successful Munster SHC campaign in 1952, and was a non-playing substitute when Cork beat Dublin in the 1952 All-Ireland final. O'Connor was again part of the Cork team that retained their Munster and All-Ireland titles in 1953.

O'Connor left the Sarsfields club in 1958 but continued to line out with his home clubs of Cappoquin and Affane. He won a Waterford JFC title with the latter in 1963. O'Connor continued to line out at club level until 1976.

== Personal life and death ==
O'Connor joined the Irish Army during the Emergency. He was stationed in a number of areas, including Fermoy, and was based in Dungarvan at the time of his retirement after 30 years in 1982. O'Connor was married to Patricia Fraher and had four children.

O'Connor died suddenly on 13 April 1983, at the age of 61.

== Honours ==
Cappoquin

- Waterford Junior Hurling Championship: 1944, 1948

Affane

- Waterford Junior Football Championship: 1953

Sarsfields

- Cork Senior Hurling Championship: 1951, 1957 (c)

Cork

- All-Ireland Senior Hurling Championship: 1952, 1953
- Munster Senior Hurling Championship: 1952, 1953
- National Hurling League: 1952–53
