= Willie Walsh (hurler, born 1938) =

Irish hurler

Personal information
- Native name: Liam Breathnach (Irish)
- Born: 1938 (age 87–88) Cork, Ireland

Sport
- Sport: Hurling
- Position: Midfield
Club
- Years: Club
- St Finbarr's
Club titles
	Football	Hurling
Cork titles	1	1
Inter-county*
Years	County	Apps (scores)
1956-1961	Cork	3 (0-00)
Inter-county titles
- Munster titles: 0
- All-Irelands: 0
- NHL: 0
- *Inter County team apps and scores correct as of 22:54, 24 April 2016.

William Walsh (born 1938) is an Irish former hurler who played as a midfielder at senior level for the Cork county team.
