= Eoghan Murphy (Sarsfields hurler) =

Irish hurler

Personal information
- Native name: Eoghan Ó Murchú (Irish)
- Born: 1997 (age 28–29) Douglas, Cork, Ireland
- Occupation: Student
- Height: 5 ft 0 in (152 cm)

Sport
- Position: Right wing-back
Club
- Years: Club
- Sarsfields
Club titles
- Cork titles: 1
College
- Years: College
- 2015-present: University College Cork
College titles
- Fitzgibbon titles: 2
Inter-county*
Years	County	Apps (scores)
2019-	Cork	0 (0-00)
Inter-county titles
- Munster titles: 0
- All-Irelands: 0
- All Stars: 0
	Football	Hurling
League titles		0
- *Inter County team apps and scores correct as of 18:55, 6 March 2019.

Eoghan Murphy (born 1997) is an Irish hurler who plays for Cork Senior Championship club Sarsfields and at inter-county level with the Cork senior hurling team. He usually lines out as a right wing-back.

== Playing career ==
=== University College Cork ===
On 23 February 2019, Murphy was joint-captain of the University College Cork team that faced Mary Immaculate College in the Fitzgibbon Cup final. He was at centre-back in the 2–21 to 0–13 victory.

Murphy was involved in a second successive Fitzgibbon Cup final on 12 February 2020 when he once again served as joint-captain of the team. Selected at full-back, he suffered a broken finger which ruled him out for the remainder of the competition. However the UCC team prevailed after the 0–18 to 2–11 defeat of the Institute of Technology, Carlow.

=== Sarsfields ===
Murphy joined the Sarsfields club at a young age and played in all grades at juvenile and underage levels and experienced championship success in the minor and under-21 grades.

=== Cork ===
==== Minor and Under 21 ====
Murphy first lined out for Cork when he captained the minor team during the 2015 Munster Championship. He made his first appearance for the team at centre-back on 8 April in a 2–20 to 1–13 defeat of Limerick.

On 13 July 2017, Murphy made his first appearance for the Cork under-21 hurling team when he lined out at full-back in Cork's one-point defeat of Waterford. On 26 July he was again named at full-back but lined out at right corner-back in Cork's 0–16 to 1–11 defeat by Limerick in the Munster Championship final.

On 4 July 2018, Murphy scored a point from centre-back when Cork defeated Tipperary by 2–23 to 1–13 to win the Munster Championship for the first time in 11 years. He was at right wing-back when Cork suffered a 3–13 to 1–16 defeat by Tipperary in the All-Ireland final on 26 August.

==== Senior ====
Murphy made his first appearance for the Cork senior hurling team in the pre-season Munster League on 2 January 2019. In spite of being named at left wing-back he started the game on the bench but was introduced as a half-time substitute for Aidan Walsh in the 1–24 to 1–18 defeat by Waterford.

== Managing career ==
In Spring of 2019, Murphy was invited to join the management team of Ed Byrnely F.C. by Sporting Director, Bill Sheehan (hurler). His appointment was greeted with great enthusiasm amongst the Ed Byrnly faithful however he failed to live up to the hype with his team failing to win a single game under his stewardship. One particularly disgruntled fan in a post match interview for Ed Byrnely Fan TV compared his presence on the sideline to "a rabbit caught in the headlights." His contract was cancelled on 25 February 2019. He has not taken up a managing position since then, nor is there any prospect of anybody hiring him as one in the future.

== Academic career ==
Murphy has studied Process and chemical engineering in University College Cork since 2015. Tragedy struck in August 2017, however, when he was informed that he had failed two repeat exams and as a result would have to repeat second year. He has attributed his failure to "living like a cowboy". With the help of friends and family, Murphy did however manage to turn his life around and despite being unable to shake the affectionate nickname "repeatard", he has not had a single repeat exam for over two years.

== Personal life ==
Murphy is a keen hunter, with a particular fondness for hunting wild pigeons.

== Honours ==
University College Cork

- Fitzgibbon Cup (2): 2019 (jc), 2020

Sarsfields

- Cork Premier Under-21 A Hurling Championship (1): 2017(C)
- Cork Premier 1 Minor Hurling Championship (1): 2014
- Cork Senior Hurling Championship (1): 2014

Cork

- Munster Under-21 Hurling Championship (1): 2018

Sporting positions
Preceded by Shane Kingston	Cork Minor Hurling Captain; 2015	Succeeded by Niall O'Leary
