= Ronan Dwane =

Irish hurler

Personal information
- Native name: Rónán Ó Duáin (Irish)
- Born: 1973 (age 52–53) Aghada, County Cork, Ireland
- Occupation: Secondary school teacher

Sport
- Sport: Hurling
- Position: Centre-forward
Clubs
- Years: Club
- Aghada; Imokilly
Club titles
- Cork titles: 2
Inter-county*
Years	County	Apps (scores)
1997	Cork	0 (0-00)
Inter-county titles
- Munster titles: 0
- All-Irelands: 0
- NHL: 0
- All Stars: 0
- *Inter County team apps and scores correct as of 02:53, 28 July 2015.

Ronan Dwane (born 1973) is an Irish retired hurler who played as a centre-forward for the Cork senior team.

Born in Aghada, County Cork, Dwane first played competitive hurling during his schooling at Midleton CBS Secondary School. He arrived on the inter-county scene at the age of sixteen when he first linked up with the Cork minor team before later joining the under-21 and intermediate sides. He joined the senior panel during the 1997 championship.

At club level Dwane was a two-time championship medallist with Imokilly He also played with Aghada.

In retirement from playing Dwane has become involved in team management and coaching. As well as coaching Midleton CBS at various levels he has coached the Carrigtwohill senior team. At inter-county level he has served as coach with various Cork teams in all grades. He is the current manager of the Cork intermediate team.

== Honours ==
=== Player ===
Midleton CBS

- Dean Ryan Cup (1): 1989

Aghada

- Cork Minor B Hurling Championship (1): 1989

Imokilly

- Cork Senior Hurling Championship (2): 1997, 1998

Cork

- All-Ireland Intermediate Hurling Championship (1): 1997
- Munster Intermediate Hurling Championship (2): 1997, 2001

Sporting positions
Preceded by Liam Hayes	Cork Intermediate Hurling Manager; 2014-2018	Succeeded by Position abolished
