= Jim Hurley =

Irish hurler and Gaelic footballer (1902–1965)

Personal information
- Native name: Séamus Ó Muirthile (Irish)
- Nickname: Big Jim
- Born: 26 February 1902 Clonakilty, County Cork, Ireland
- Died: 10 February 1965 (aged 62) Cork, Ireland
- Occupation: University bursar
- Height: 6 ft 0 in (183 cm)

Sport
- Football Position: Centre-back
- Hurling Position: Midfield
Clubs
- Years: Club
- Clonakilty; University College Cork; Blackrock; Dunshaughlin
Inter-county*
Years	County	Apps (scores)
1924-1930 1926-1934	Cork (football); Cork (hurling)	7 (0-00); 32 (3-36)
Inter-county titles
	Football	Hurling
Munster Titles	1	5
All-Ireland Titles	0	4
League titles	0	2
- *Inter County team apps and scores correct as of 23:33, 29 July 2014.

Jim Hurley (26 February 1902 – 10 February 1965) was an Irish sportsperson and revolutionary. A veteran of the Irish independence struggle, he subsequently played hurling and football with Cork in the 1920s.

== Early life ==
Jim Hurley was born in Clonakilty, County Cork on 26 February 1902. In his youth, he became involved in the Irish struggle for independence. He played a prominent role in the War of Independence as leader of a flying column in the Third Cork Brigade. Following the publication of the Anglo-Irish Treaty, Hurley took the republican side in the subsequent Civil War. He was later interred in Cork and the Curragh but was released in 1924. Following this, Hurley returned to his native Clonakilty where he became town clerk and shortly afterwards, he enrolled as a night student at University College Cork. It was here that his sporting career began in earnest as he won a Fitzgibbon Cup medal with UCC's hurlers.

== Anti Treaty Republican ==
Jim Hurley was interned by the Irish Free State government at the Curragh Internment Camp (Tintown) and was on hunger strike there for 42 days during the 1923 Irish hunger strikes.

== Playing career ==
=== Club ===
In 1925, Hurley moved to Cork. He subsequently played his club hurling with Blackrock and his club football with UCC. With the famous Blackrock club, he won Cork SHC titles in 1925, 1927, 1929 and 1930. Hurley was also successful in terms of club football winning Cork SFC titles with UCC in 1927 and 1928. In 1930, he returned to Clonakilty with whom he won a Cork JFC title in 1930 and a Cork IFC title in 1931. For the next two years, he played senior football for Na Deasúnaigh but had little success with the side. In the mid-1930s, Hurley lived in County Meath where he played club hurling with Kilmessan and won a Meath SHC title.

=== Inter-county ===
By 1924, Hurley was playing junior hurling with Cork at inter-county level. This culminated in the winning of Munster and All-Ireland titles in 1925. He quickly joined the senior team and in 1926 captured his first National Hurling League, Munster and All-Ireland honours. Hurley was instrumental in attack in the final against Kilkenny. It was the beginning of a glorious era for Cork hurling. Hurley captured his second Munster medal in 1927, however, Dublin accounted for Cork in the All-Ireland final.

He added a third Munster title to his collection of medals in 1928, before winning his second All-Ireland medal following a win over Galway. In 1929, he captured his fourth Munster medal in-a-row before later playing in his fourth All-Ireland final in-a-row. Cork's opponents in the final were Galway once again and Ahern scored a goal after just 30 seconds. It brought him his third All-Ireland medal. Cork had no little success in the championship of 1930, however, Hurley claimed his second National League medal. In 1931, Cork were back under the captaincy of Eudie Coughlan. Hurley won his fifth Munster title and once again qualified for the All-Ireland final, this time against Kilkenny. It took two replays to separate the two sides with Cork eventually emerging as the victors. He retired from inter-county hurling shortly after.

== Later life ==
Following his retirement from inter-county hurling and football, Hurley had a distinguished career as a public servant. In 1932, he graduated from UCC with a BComm degree and was appointed County Accountant with Meath County Council. He later moved to Longford where he worked as County Secretary. In 1937, Hurley returned to Cork and studied for an Arts degree in UCC. He graduated in 1942 and returned to Meath as County Manager. In 1944, Hurley returned to Cork and was appointed Secretary and Bursar of UCC, a position he held until his death.

His return to his native county coincided with a great era for Clonakilty's and for Cork's footballers. Hurley was a selector on the Cork football team that won the All-Ireland in 1945 and he was largely responsible for Jack Lynch’s selection on that team. He was also involved as a selector when Cork reached the All-Ireland finals of 1956 and 1957, and he was a selector on the Cork hurling team in the early 1960s.

On 10 February 1965, Hurley died from stomach cancer aged 62.
