= Francie O'Regan =

Irish hurler

Personal information
- Native name: Prionsias Ó Ríogáin (Irish)
- Nickname: Francie
- Born: 1933 Blackpool, Cork, Ireland
- Died: 1 May 2015 (aged 82) Farranree, Cork, Ireland
- Occupation: CIÉ employee

Sport
- Sport: Hurling
- Position: Left wing-back
Clubs
- Years: Club
- Glen Rovers; St. Nicholas'
Club titles
- Cork titles: 4
Inter-county*
Years	County	Apps (scores)
1958-1959	Cork	0 (0-00)
Inter-county titles
- Munster titles: 0
- All-Irelands: 0
- NHL: 0
- *Inter County team apps and scores correct as of 20:25, 4 March 2019.

Francis O'Regan (1933 – 1 May 2015) was an Irish hurler who played for Cork Senior Championship club Glen Rovers and at inter-county level with the Cork senior hurling team. He usually lined out as a left wing-back.

== Career ==
O'Regan first made an impression as a hurler with the Glen Rovers club. He eventually progressed onto the club's senior team and won four Cork SHC titles, including one as captain in 1962. O'Regan first appeared on the inter-county scene as a member of the Cork minor hurling team that won the All-Ireland MHC title in 1951. He was later included on the Cork junior team that lost the 1959 All-Ireland junior home final to Antrim. O'Regan was also a member of the Cork senior hurling team that year.

== Personal life and death ==
O'Regan spent the majority of his working life with CIÉ. He died in Cork on 1 May 2015.

== Honours ==
Glen Rovers

- Cork Senior Hurling Championship: 1958, 1959, 1960, 1962 (c)

Cork

- Munster Junior Hurling Championship: 1959
- All-Ireland Minor Hurling Championship: 1951
- Munster Minor Hurling Championship: 1951
