= Billex Moloney =

Irish hurler

Personal information
- Native name: Liam Ó Maoldomhnaigh (Irish)
- Nickname: Billex
- Born: 21 April 1875 Erinville Hospital, Cork, Ireland
- Died: 22 July 1954 (aged 79) Mercy Hospital, Cork, Ireland
- Occupation: Clerk

Sport
- Sport: Hurling
Club
- Years: Club
- St Finbarr's
Club titles
- Cork titles: 4
Inter-county
- Years: County
- 1901-1905: Cork
Inter-county titles
- Munster titles: 3
- All-Irelands: 0

William Moloney (21 April 1875 – 22 July 1954), known as Billex Moloney, was an Irish hurler. At club level he played with St Finbarr's and was a member of the Cork senior hurling team.

== Career ==
Moloney began his association with the St Finbarr's club at a time when teams were 21-a-side. Regarded by the club as "one of the best defenders of all time", he was in defence when "the Barr's" won their inaugural County Championship title in 1899. He won a further three titles as part of a three-in-a-row of successes from 1904 to 1906. Moloney had lined out in a number of tournament and exhibition games for the Cork senior hurling team before becoming a regular member of the team during the delayed 1902 championship. He went on to win three Munster Championship titles in four seasons, however, an All-Ireland Championship title eluded him. Moloney went on to train and serve as a selector with a number of St. Finbarr's teams after his retirement from playing.

== Honours ==
St Finbarr's

- Cork Senior Hurling Championship: 1899, 1904, 1905, 1906

Cork

- Munster Senior Hurling Championship: 1902, 1904, 1905
