= Paddy Delea =

Irish hurler

Personal information
- Native name: Pádrag Ó Duilé (Irish)
- Born: 26 October 1900 Blackrock, County Cork, Ireland
- Died: 20 April 1969 (aged 68) Blackrock, County Cork, Ireland
- Occupation: Lorry driver

Sport
- Sport: Hurling
- Position: Left wing-forward
Club
- Years: Club
- Blackrock
Club titles
- Cork titles: 7
Inter-county
Years	County	Apps (scores)
1922-1931	Cork	28 (11-14)
Inter-county titles
- Munster titles: 5
- All-Irelands: 5
- NHL: 1

Patrick Delea (26 October 1900 – 20 April 1969) was an Irish sportsperson. He played hurling with his local club Blackrock and was a member of the Cork senior inter-county team from 1922 until 1931. He was born in Blackrock, County Cork, Ireland.

== Playing career ==
=== Club ===
Delea played his club hurling with the famous Blackrock club in Cork. He won his first senior county title in 1924 and added five more titles to his collection in 1925, 1927, 1929, 1930 and 1931.

=== Inter-county ===
Delea first came to prominence on the inter-county scene in the mid-1920s. He won his first Munster title as a substitute in 1926. Delea later lined out in his first All-Ireland decider as snow covered Croke Park for an October final. Kilkenny provided the opposition on that occasion, however, Cork were victorious giving Delea his first All-Ireland medal. He won a second Munster medal in 1927 before later lining out in a second consecutive All-Ireland final. The Dublin team, which consisted of nine Gardaí, trounced the Corkmen on a score line of 4-8 to 1-3. Delea captured a third Munster title in 1928 before appearing in a third championship decider. Galway, a team who had received a bye into the final without playing a single game, provided the opposition on this occasion. Delea scored two of Cork's points as 'the Rebels' romped home with a 27-point win giving him a second All-Ireland medal. 1929 saw Delea win a fourth consecutive Munster title. Once again, he lined out in that year's All-Ireland final where Galway lined out as well. Once again, it was the men from the west who lost out as Delea claimed a third All-Ireland title. Cork lost their provincial crown in 1930, however, the team bounced back in 1931 with Delea winning a fifth Munster medal. A fifth All-Ireland final appearance later followed with Kilkenny providing the opposition. The final went to two replays, with Delea scoring the equalising goal in the second game. Cork eventually triumphed in the third game with Delea picking up his fourth All-Ireland medal. The Cork team went into decline following this game and Delea later retired from inter-county hurling.

=== Provincial ===
Delea also won a Railway Cup inter-provincial title with Munster in 1931.

== Personal life and death ==
Delea was born in Blackrock, Cork, the second of five children born to James and Mary (née Linehan). His father, a brewery worker, won All-Ireland Championships with Cork as a member of their first three-in-a-row team between 1892 and 1894. Delea spent most of his working life as a lorry driver with Shell Oil. He married Annie Walsh in Douglas in April 1928. They later settled in Douglas and had seven children.

On 20 April 1969, Delea died from renal failure aged 68 at St. Finbarr's Hospital in Cork.
