= Pat Leahy (Cork hurler) =

Irish hurler

Personal information
- Native name: Pádraig Ó Laocha (Irish)
- Born: 4 August 1878 Dungourney, County Cork, Ireland
- Died: 1 April 1950 (aged 71) Dungourney, County Cork, Ireland
- Occupation: Labourer

Sport
- Sport: Hurling
- Position: Forward
Club
- Years: Club
- 1890s-1900s: Dungourney
Club titles
- Cork titles: 3
Inter-county
- Years: County
- 1902-1907: Cork
Inter-county titles
- Munster titles: 2
- All-Irelands: 1

Pat Leahy (4 August 1878 – 1 April 1950) was an Irish sportsperson. He played hurling with his local club Dungourney and was a member of the Cork senior inter-county team from 1902 until 1907.

== Playing career ==
=== Club ===
Leahy played his club hurling with the famous Dungourney team in Cork and enjoyed some success. He won three county senior championship titles in all, with these victories coming in 1902, 1907 and 1909.

=== Inter-county ===
Leahy first tasted success on the inter-county scene with Cork in 1902 when he lined out in his first Munster final. Limerick provided the opposition, however, Cork were the winners by 2-9 to 1-5 and Leahy collected a Munster winners’ medal. Galway and Dublin were later defeated as Cork booked their place in the All-Ireland final with London providing the opposition. The game was played in Cork to mark the opening of the new Cork Athletic Ground. Leahy's side made no mistake on this occasion and powered to a 3-13 to 0-0 victory. It was a huge triumph for Cork and gave Leahy an All-Ireland winners’ medal.

Leahy did not take part in any inter-county activity for the next few years, however, in 1907 he finally picked up a second Munster winners’ medal following a 1-6 to 1-4 defeat of Tipperary. Cork later reached the All-Ireland final with Kilkenny providing the opposition. A high-scoring, but close, game developed between these two great rivals once again. As the game entered the final stage there was little to separate the two sides. Jimmy Kelly scored three first-half goals while Jack Anthony scored Kilkenny's winning point at the death. Cork went on two late goal hunts; however, the final score of 3-12 to 4-8 gave Kilkenny the win. It was Leahy's last All-Ireland final appearance.

== Sources ==
- Corry, Eoghan, The GAA Book of Lists (Hodder Headline Ireland, 2005).
- Cronin, Jim, A Rebel Hundred: Cork's 100 All-Ireland Titles.
- Donegan, Des, The Complete Handbook of Gaelic Games (DBA Publications Limited, 2005).
