= Eoin Quigley =

Irish hurler

Personal information
- Native name: Eoghan Ó Coigligh (Irish)
- Nickname: Quigs
- Born: 13 October 1981 (age 45) Wexford, Ireland
- Occupation: Pharmaceutical sales
- Height: 6 ft 2 in (188 cm)

Sport
- Sport: Hurling
- Position: Centre-forward
Clubs
- Years: Club
- 1999-2010 2011-present: St Martin's; Sarsfields
Club titles
- Wexford titles: 2
Inter-county*
Years	County	Apps (scores)
2004-2014	Wexford	30 (2-22)
Inter-county titles
- Leinster titles: 1
- All-Irelands: 0
- NHL: 0
- All Stars: 0
- *Inter County team apps and scores correct as of 19:24, 28 January 2014.

Eoin Quigley (born 13 October 1981) is an Irish hurler who played as a centre-forward for the Wexford senior team.

Born in Piercestown, County Wexford, Quigley first played competitive hurling whilst at school at Wexford CBS. He first made his mark on the inter-county scene when he first linked up with the Wexford under-21 team. He made his senior debut in the 2004 championship. Quigley went on to play a key part for Wexford for almost a decade and won one Leinster medals and one National Hurling League (Division 2) medal.

As a member of the Leinster inter-provincial team at various times, Quigley won one Railway Cup medal in 2009. At club level he is a two-time championship medallist with St Martin's, before later transferring to Sarsfields where he won another championship medal.

Throughout his career Cloonan made 30 championship appearances. He announced his retirement from inter-county hurling on 28 January 2014.

His father, John, as well as his uncles, Dan, Martin and Pat, all played for Wexford, with some experiencing All-Ireland success.

Quigley also had a spell as a footballer with Bohemians.

== Honours ==
=== Team ===
St Martin's

- Wexford Senior Hurling Championship (2): 1999, 2008

Sarsfields

- Cork Senior Hurling Championship (1): 2010

Wexford

- Leinster Senior Hurling Championship (1): 2004
- National Hurling League (Division 2) (1): 2010

Leinster

- Railway Cup (1): 2009
