= Jerry Desmond =

Irish hurler

Personal information
- Native name: Diarmuid Ó Deasúnaigh (Irish)
- Born: 1876 Killeagh, County Cork, Ireland
- Died: 26 April 1958 (aged 81–82) Killeagh, County Cork, Ireland
- Occupation: Farmer

Sport
- Sport: Hurling
- Position: Forward
Club
- Years: Club
- Dungourney
Club titles
- Cork titles: 3
Inter-county
- Years: County
- 1902-1907: Cork
Inter-county titles
- Munster titles: 4
- All-Irelands: 2

Jeremiah Desmond (1876 - 26 April 1958) was an Irish sportsman. He played hurling with his local club Dungourney and was a member of the Cork senior inter-county team from 1902 until 1907.

== Playing career ==
=== Club ===
Desmond played his club hurling with his local Dungourney team in Cork and enjoyed some success. He won three county senior championship titles in all, with victory coming in 1902, 1907 and 1909.

=== Inter-county ===
Desmond first tasted success on the inter-county scene with Cork in 1902 when he lined out in his first Munster final. Limerick provided the opposition on that occasion and n exciting contest ensued. At the final whistle Cork were the winners by 2-9 to 1-5 and Desmond collected a Munster winners’ medal. Cork subsequently defeated Galway and Dublin were later defeated as Cork booked their place in the All-Ireland final with London providing the opposition. The game was played in Cork to mark the opening of the new Cork Athletic Ground. Desmond's side made no mistake on this occasion and went on to win 3-13 to 0-0, giving Desmond an All-Ireland winners’ medal.

Desmond was still a key member of the Cork team again in 1903. That year, he collected a second Munster winners’ medal as Cork defeated Waterford by 5-16 to 1-1. Cork later received a walkover from Galway before defeating Kilkenny in the ‘home’ championship decider. London provided the opposition for a third time in the proper All-Ireland final. Cork were well on top for the entire game and secured a 3-16 to 1-1 victory. It was Desmond’s second consecutive All-Ireland winners’ medal.

In 1904 Desmond and Cork were attempting to capture a third All-Ireland title in-a-row. The campaign began well with Cork defeating Tipperary to secure a fourth consecutive Munster title. A subsequent trouncing of Antrim set up an All-Ireland final showdown with Kilkenny. It was the beginning of a hugely successful era for ‘the Cats’ as Cork were heading into decline. Kilkenny won the game thanks to Dick Doyle’s first-half goal, while Pat ‘Fox’ Maher made great save at the end to help his team to a 1-9 to 1-8 defeat of Desmond’s side.

After being dropped from the Cork team for a number of years Desmond was back in 1907. That year he picked up a fourth Munster winners’ medal following a 1-6 to 1-4 defeat of Tipperary. Cork later reached the All-Ireland final with Kilkenny providing the opposition. A high-scoring, but close, game developed between these two great rivals once again. As the game entered the final stage there was little to separate the two sides. Jimmy Kelly scored three first-half goals while Jack Anthony scored Kilkenny’s winning point at the death. Cork went on two late goal hunts; however, the final score of 3-12 to 4-8 gave Kilkenny the win. It was Desmond’s last All-Ireland final appearance.
