= Willie Donnelly (hurler) =

Irish hurler

Personal information
- Native name: Liam Ó Donnaile (Irish)

Sport
- Sport: Hurling
- Position: Right wing-back
Clubs
- Years: Club
- Collins; Blackrock
Club titles
- Cork titles: 3
Inter-county*
| Years | County | Apps (scores) |
| 1927–1929 | Cork | 4 (0-00) |
Inter-county titles
- Munster titles: 3
- All-Irelands: 2
- *Inter County team apps and scores correct as of 18:54, 7 April 2018.

Willie Donnelly was an Irish hurler. His championship career with the Cork senior team lasted from 1927 to 1929.

Donnelly first played competitive hurling with the Collins club. He later joined the Blackrock club with whom he won three county championship medals.

Donnelly made his senior inter-county debut during the 1927 championship. He was a regular member of the team over the course of the following three seasons, winning back-to-back All-Ireland medals. Donnelly also won three Munster medals.

== Honours ==
Blackrock

- Cork Senior Hurling Championship (1): 1929, 1930, 1931

Cork

- All-Ireland Senior Hurling Championship (2): 1928, 1929
- Munster Senior Hurling Championship (3): 1927, 1928, 1929
