= Bernard Hurley =

Irish hurler

Personal information
- Native name: Bearnard Ó hUrthuile (Irish)
- Born: 1948 (age 77–78) Blackrock, Cork, Ireland

Sport
- Sport: Hurling
- Position: Goalkeeper
Club
- Years: Club
- Blackrock
Club titles
- Cork titles: 1
- Munster titles: 1
- All-Ireland Titles: 1
Inter-county*
Years	County	Apps (scores)
1970	Cork	0 (0-00)
Inter-county titles
- Munster titles: 0
- All-Irelands: 0
- NHL: 0
- *Inter County team apps and scores correct as of 00:17, 22 July 2014.

Bernard Hurley (born 1948) is an Irish retired hurler who played as a goalkeeper for the Cork senior team.

Born in Blackrock, Cork, Hurley first arrived on the inter-county scene at the age of seventeen when he first linked up with the Cork minor team, before later joining the Cork under-21 team. He joined the extended senior panel during the 1970 championship.

At club level Hurley is a one-time All-Ireland medallist with Blackrock. In addition to this he has also won one Munster medal and one championship medal.

== Honours ==
=== Team ===
Blackrock

- All-Ireland (1): 1972
- Munster Senior Club Hurling Championship (1): 1971
- Cork Senior Club Hurling Championship (1): 1971

Cork

- All-Ireland Under-21 Hurling Championship (2): 1968, 1969
- Munster Under-21 Hurling Championship (2): 1968, 1969
- All-Ireland Minor Hurling Championship (1): 1966
- Munster Minor Hurling Championship (1): 1966
