= Joe Salmon =

Irish hurler (1930–1991)

Personal information
- Native name: Seosamh Ó Bradáin (Irish)
- Born: 1 April 1930 County Galway, Ireland
- Died: 23 July 1991 (aged 61) County Cork, Ireland

Sport
- Sport: Hurling
- Position: Midfield
Club
- Years: Club
- Meelick-Eyrecourt
Inter-county
- Years: County
- 1949-1964: Galway
Inter-county titles
- Connacht titles: 0
- All-Irelands: 0
- NHL: 1

Peter Joseph Salmon (1 April 1930 – 23 July 1991) was an Irish sportsperson. He played hurling at various times with his local club, Meelick-Eyrecourt. He played Minor hurling with nearby Portumna. Later in his career he switched, for a short period, to Liam Mellows in Galway and Glen Rovers in Cork because of migration.

Salmon also played with the Galway senior inter-county team from 1949 until 1964.

== Playing career ==
=== Club ===
Salmon played his club hurling with his local club Meelick-Eyrecourt. He also played with the Glen Rovers club in Cork. In all, Salmon collected five county championship medals.

=== Inter-county ===
Salmon first became prominent with the Galway minor inter-county team in the 1940s. He lined out in the All-Ireland final of 1947. However, Tipperary were the victors on that occasion.

Salmon later joined the Galway senior team; however, as the county faced no competition in the Connacht Senior Hurling Championship, the team went straight into the All-Ireland series every year.

Salmon first tasted success with Galway in 1951. That year, his side reached the finals of the National Hurling League. Galway defeated Wexford and New York, giving Salmon a National League medal.

Two years later, in 1953, Galway defeated the Kilkenny team in the penultimate stage of the championship. This victory allowed Salmon's side to advance to the All-Ireland final, where Cork provided the opposition. Galway lost the game by 3-3 to 0-8. After the match at the Gresham Hotel in Dublin, a fight broke out when another Galway player struck Cork's Christy Ring. The following morning, another fight broke out when another member of the Galway panel attempted to hit Ring. The fights, however, ended just as quickly as they had started.

Five years later, in 1958, Galway was given a bye into the All-Ireland final to improve the standard of hurling in the county. Tipperray provided the opposition on that occasion. Liam Devaney, Donie Nealon, and Larry Keane scored goals for Tipp in the first half, while Tony Wall sent a 70-yard free untouched to the Galway net. Tipp won the game by 4-9 to 2-5.

This defeat saw Galway enter the Munster Championship in 1959. Salmon retired from inter-county hurling in 1964.

=== Provincial ===
Salmon also lined out with Connacht in the inter-provincial hurling competition; however, he never won a Railway Cup medal.

== Personal life and death ==
Salmon married Celia Morgan in 1964, and together they had three children. He died suddenly at his home in Cork, on 23 July 1991, at the age of 61.

== Sources ==
- Corry, Eoghan, The GAA Book of Lists (Hodder Headline Ireland, 2005)
