= Battna Barrett =

Irish hurler

Personal information
- Native name: Parthalán Bairéid (Irish)
- Nickname: Battna
- Born: 4 June 1906 Shandon, Cork, Ireland
- Died: 8 March 1974 (aged 67) Glanmire, Cork, Ireland
- Occupation: Rubber worker

Sport
- Sport: Hurling
- Position: Left corner-forward
Club
- Years: Club
- Glen Rovers
Club titles
- Cork titles: 6
Inter-county
Years	County	Apps (scores)
1956-1964	Cork	3 (4-00)
Inter-county titles
- Munster titles: 0
- All-Irelands: 0
- NHL: 0

Bartholomew Barrett (4 June 1906 – 8 March 1974), known as Battna Barrett, was an Irish hurler who played at club level with Glen Rovers and at inter-county level with the Cork senior hurling team. He usually lined out as a forward.

== Playing career ==
Barrett first made an impression as a hurler with the Glen Rovers club. He eventually progressed onto the club's senior team and won six consecutive Cork SHC titles between 1934 and 1939 during a golden age for the Glen. Barrett's skill at club level brought him to the attention of the Cork senior hurling team and he made his first appearance on the inter-county scene in 1934. He scored four goals on his debut against Tipperary. Barrett continued to line out with Cork until 1936.

== Personal life and death ==
Barrett was born in Shanon on Cork's northside, the eldest surviving son of Stephen and Hannah (née Courtney). After completing his education, he worked as a rubber worker with Dunlop's. Barrett married Margaret Hegarty in January 1944. He died at St Stephen's Hospital in Glanmire on 8 March 1974.

== Honours ==
Glen Rovers

- Cork Senior Hurling Championship: 1934, 1935, 1936, 1937, 1938, 1939
