= Finbarr O'Neill =

Irish hurler

Personal information
- Native name: Fionnbarra Ó Néill (Irish)
- Born: 1941 (age 84–85) Blackpool, Cork, Ireland
- Height: 5 ft 7 in (170 cm)

Sport
- Sport: Hurling
- Position: Goalkeeper
Club
- Years: Club
- Glen Rovers
Club titles
- Cork titles: 5
- Munster titles: 3
- All-Ireland Titles: 2
Inter-county
Years	County	Apps (scores)
1965-1968	Cork	2 (0-00)
Inter-county titles
- Munster titles: 1
- All-Irelands: 1
- NHL: 0

Finbarr O'Neill (born 1941) is an Irish retired hurler. He played hurling at club level with Glen Rovers and at inter-county level as a member of the Cork senior hurling team.

== Biography ==
O'Neill joined the Glen Rovers club at a young age and made his senior debut as goalkeeper during the 1964 championship. He won All-Ireland Championship medals in 1973 and 1977. O'Neill also won three Munster Championship medals and five County Championship medals.

At inter-county level, O'Neill was sub-goalkeeper on the Cork senior hurling team that won the All-Ireland Championship in 1966. He had earlier won a Munster Championship medal as a substitute.

== Honours ==
Glen Rovers

- All-Ireland Senior Club Hurling Championship (2): 1973, 1977
- Munster Senior Club Hurling Championship (3): 1964, 1973, 1977
- Cork Senior Hurling Championship (5): 1964, 1967, 1969, 1972, 1976

Cork

- All-Ireland Senior Hurling Championship (1): 1966
- Munster Senior Hurling Championship (1): 1966
- Poc Fada Champion ( 3 ) 1966, 1967, 1968
