= 1909 Cork Senior Hurling Championship =

Annual hurling competition season

- Dates: 9 May 1909 – 25 July 1909
- Teams: 11
- Champions: Dungourney (3rd title); Jamesy Kelleher (captain)
- Runners-up: Sarsfields; John Foley (captain)

The 1909 Cork Senior Hurling Championship was the 22nd staging of the Cork Senior Hurling Championship since its establishment by the Cork County Board in 1887. The draw for the opening round fixtures took place on 21 April 1909. The championship began on 9 May 1909 and ended on 25 July 1909.

Blackrock were the defending champions, however, they were beaten by Dungourney at the semi-final stage.

On 25 July 1909, Dungourney won the championship following a 6–10 to 1–8 defeat of Sarsfields in the final. This was their third championship title overall and their first title in two championship seasons.

== Results ==
=== First round ===
9 May 1909 First round	Blackrock	5-13 - 4-08	Midleton	Carrignafoy Ground

16 May 1909 First round	Ballymartle	0-05 - 5-04	Cove	Cork Athletic Grounds

23 May 1909 First round	Dungourney	5-10 - 4-03	Redmonds	Cork Athletic Grounds

30 May 1909 First round	Passage	0-02 - 8-10	St Mary's	Carrignafoy Ground

30 May 1909 First round	Sarsfields	w/o - scr.	Castletownroche	Mallow Town Park

- St. Finbarr's received a bye in this round.

=== Second round ===
6 June 1909 Second round	Blackrock	5-14 - 2-06	St. Finbarr's	Cork Athletic Grounds

6 June 1909 Second round	Dungourney	6-12 - 0-00	Cove	Riverstown Sportsfield

- St Mary's and Sarsfields received byes in this round.

=== Semi-finals ===
20 June 1909 Semi-final	Sarsfields	4-11 - 3-07	St Mary's	Cork Athletic Grounds

4 July 1909 Semi-final	Dungourney	5-08 - 2-08	Blackrock	Cork Athletic Grounds

=== Final ===
25 July 1909 Final	Dungourney	6-10 - 1-08	Sarsfields	Cork Athletic Grounds

=== Miscellaneous ===
- Sarsfields qualify for the final for the first time.
