= Denis Scannell =

Irish hurler

Personal information
- Nickname: Dinny
- Born: Blackrock, County Cork

Sport
- Sport: Hurling
- Position: Forward
Club
- Years: Club
- 1880s–1890s: Blackrock
Club titles
- Cork titles: 8
Inter-county
Years	County	Apps (scores)
1891–1893	Cork	5
Inter-county titles
- Munster titles: 2
- All-Irelands: 2

Denis Scannell was an Irish sportsperson. He played hurling with his local club Blackrock and was a member of the Cork senior inter-county team from 1891 until 1893.

== Playing career ==
=== Club ===
Scannell played his club hurling with the famous Blackrock club and enjoyed much success throughout the first decade of club activity in Cork. Over the course of twelve championship seasons Blackrock qualified for nine county finals, with victory coming on eight occasions. Scannell was a key member of the team for all of these successes, beginning in 1887 when he captured his first county senior championship title. A second county title quickly followed in 1889. Blackrock were unlucky not to capture a five-in-a-row in the 1890s, however, defeat in 1892 broke the chain. In spite of this Scannell added to his medals tally with victories in 1891, 1893, 1894 and 1895. He finished off his career with Blackrock by winning a two-in-a-row in 1897 and 1898.

=== Inter-county ===
Scannell first came to prominence on the inter-county scene with Cork when he captained the team in 1891. It was an unsuccessful year as Cork were defeated by eventual champions Kerry in their opening game.

Scannell was on the team again in 1892 and he lined out in his first provincial decider with Kerry providing the opposition. An exciting game developed, however, at full-time Cork were the champions by 5–3 to 2–5. It was Scannell's first Munster title. Cork's next game was an All-Ireland final meeting with Dublin. The game was a controversial one as referee Dan Fraher changed his mind after initially awarding a goal to Cork. He eventually decided that the GAA's Central Council should decide the matter. Dublin, however, had walked off the field and, because of this, Cork were awarded the title. It gave Scannell an All-Ireland title.

Scannell was a member of the Cork hurling team again in 1893. That year he added a second Munster title to his collection following a 5–3 to 0–0 defeat of Limerick. Kilkenny provided the opposition in the subsequent All-Ireland final. Cork won the game on probably the most unsuitable playing field in hurling history. After someone had neglected to get the grass cut at Ashtown, both teams moved to the Phoenix Park where the game took place. A 6–8 to 0–2 victory gave Scannell a second consecutive All-Ireland title.

== Sources ==
- Corry, Eoghan, The GAA Book of Lists (Hodder Headline Ireland, 2005).
- Cronin, Jim, A Rebel Hundred: Cork's 100 All-Ireland Titles.
- Donegan, Des, The Complete Handbook of Gaelic Games (DBA Publications Limited, 2005).

Sporting positions
Preceded by Dan Lane	Cork Senior Hurling Captain; 1891	Succeeded by Bill O'Callaghan
