= Mick Dorney =

Irish hurler

Personal information
- Native name: Mícheál Ó Doirinne (Irish)
- Nickname: Down Down
- Born: 1884 Blackrock, County Cork, Ireland
- Died: 17 March 1952 (aged 68) Blackrock, County Cork, Ireland
- Occupation: Fisherman

Sport
- Sport: Hurling
Club
- Years: Club
- 1900s-1910s: Blackrock
Club titles
- Cork titles: 6
Inter-county
Years	County	Apps (scores)
1905-1913	Cork	12 (1-2)
Inter-county titles
- Munster titles: 1
- All-Irelands: 0

Mick Dorney (1884 - 17 March 1952) was an Irish hurler who played as a forward for the Cork senior team.

Dorney joined the team during the 1905 championship and became a regular player over the next decade. During that time he failed to secure an All-Ireland winner's medal, however, he did win a Munster winner's medal.

At club level, Dorney enjoyed a successful career with Blackrock, winning six county club championship winners' medals.
