= The Lough, Cork =

Suburb (and lake) in Cork, Ireland

The Lough
- Suburb and waterbody
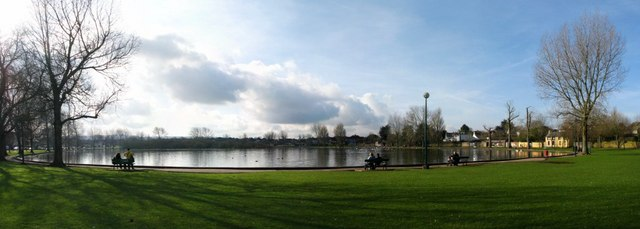
- Lake and parkland at the Lough

- Location in Ireland
- Coordinates: 51°53′14″N 8°29′12″W
- Country: Ireland
- Province: Munster
- Administrative area: Cork (city)
- Time zone: UTC+0 (WET)
  - Summer (DST): UTC-1 (IST (WEST))

The Lough is a suburb of Cork city, the electoral division in which it lies, the body of water that gives the area its name and a Roman Catholic parish of the same name. It lies on the south side of the city. The Lough is part of the Cork South-Central Dáil constituency.

== Lake ==
The Lough is a shallow spring-fed freshwater lake with an average depth of one metre and a total area of 4 hectares. It is a wildfowl preserve, particularly for swans, and has been a protected area since 1881. The Lough is also used for coarse angling (on a 'strictly catch and release basis') and is home to fish species such as carp, eel, tench, rudd and perch.

The outer border of the body of water at the Lough is approximately 1.1 kilometres (0.68 mi).

== Demographics ==
The Lough district is close to the main University College Cork campus, and has a high density of student accommodation.

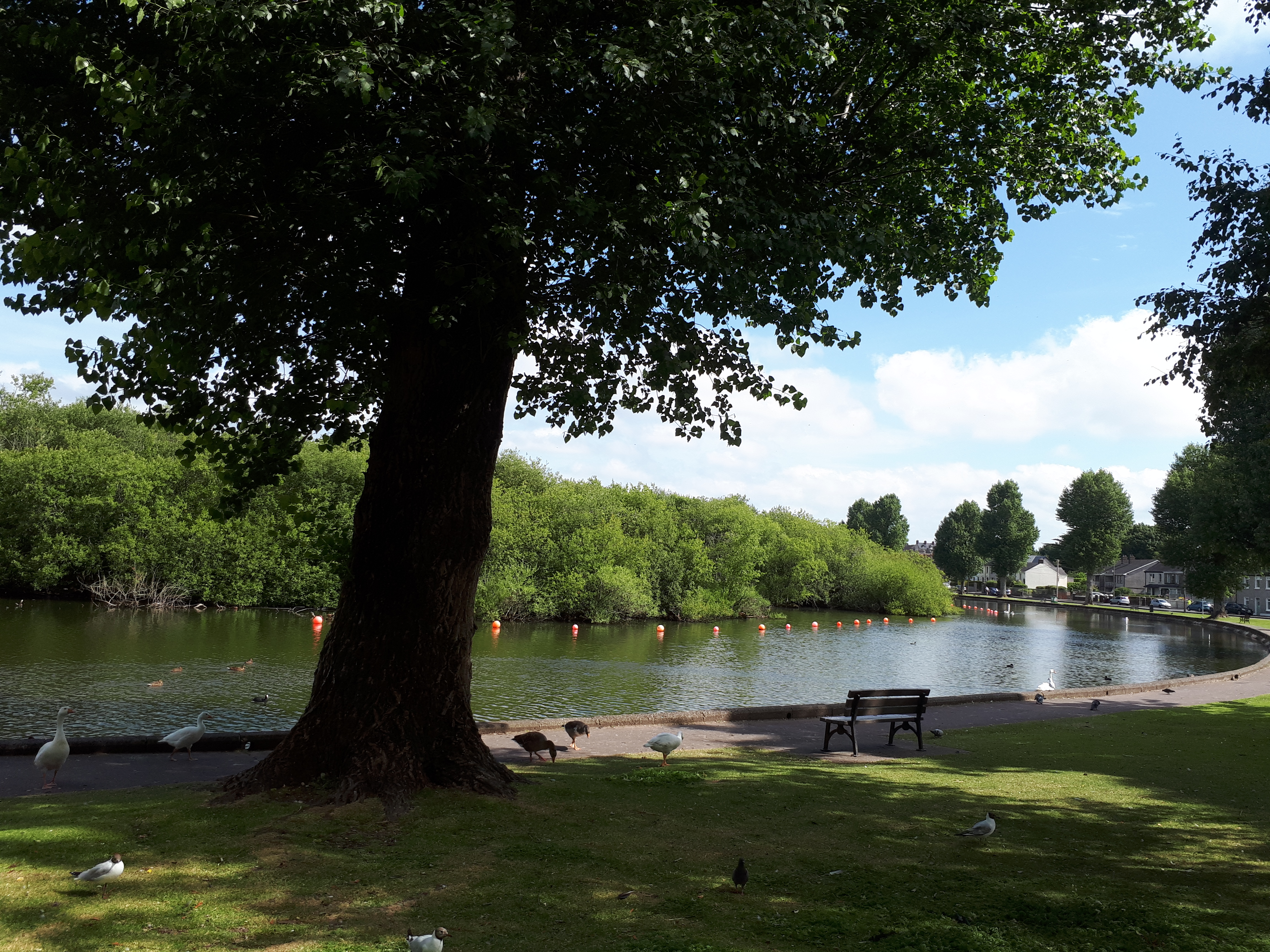
The Lough, Cork
