= 1903 Cork Senior Hurling Championship =

Annual hurling competition season

- Champions: Blackrock (9th title); Steva Riordan (captain)
- Runners-up: St. Finbarr’s

The 1903 Cork Senior Hurling Championship was the 17th staging of the Cork Senior Hurling Championship since its establishment by the Cork County Board in 1887.

Dungourney were the defending champions.

Blackrock won the championship following a 2–8 to 1–10 defeat of St. Finbarr's in the final. This was their ninth championship title and their first title in five championship seasons.

== Results ==
Final

| 10 April 1904 Final | Blackrock | 2-08 – 1-10 | St. Finbarr’s | Turners Cross, Cork |

== Championship statistics ==
=== Miscellaneous ===
- Blackrock and St Finbarr's face each-other in the final for the first time.
- Following their county championship success, Blackrock represent Cork in the inter-county championship. They become the sixth Cork team to win the All-Ireland title.
- The final is played in Turners Cross for the last time.
