= 1910 Cork Senior Hurling Championship =

Annual hurling competition season

- Dates: 3 April 1910 – 7 August 1910
- Teams: 8
- Champions: Blackrock (11th title); Tom Coughlan (captain)
- Runners-up: Dungourney; Jamesy Kelleher (captain)

Tournament statistics
- Matches played: 9
- Goals scored: 40 (4.44 per match)
- Points scored: 60 (6.67 per match)

The 1910 Cork Senior Hurling Championship was the 23rd staging of the Cork Senior Hurling Championship since its establishment by the Cork County Board in 1887. The draw for the opening round fixtures took place in February 1910. The championship began on 3 April 1910 and ended on 7 August 1910.

Dungourney were the defending champions.

On 7 August 1910, Blackrock won the championship following a 6–03 to 3–01 defeat of Dungourney in the final. This was their 11th championship title overall and their first title in two championship seasons.

== Results ==
=== Quarter-finals ===
3 April 1910 Quarter-final	Carrigtwohill	1-03 - 1-08	Blackrock	Riverstown Sportsfield, Sallybrook

10 April 1910 Quarter-final	Redmonds	1-07 - 1-07	St. Finbarr's	Cork Athletic Grounds, Cork

17 April 1910 Quarter-final	Dungourney	4-05 - 1-07	Midleton	Carrigtwohill Sportsfield, Carrigtwohill

1 May 1910 Quarter-final	St Mary's	4-00 - 4-02	Sarsfields	Cork Athletic Grounds, Cork

8 May 1910 Quarter-final replay	Redmonds	0-03 - 0-03	St. Finbarr's	Cork Athletic Grounds, Cork

29 May 1910 Quarter-final second replay	Redmonds	4-04 - 2-00	St. Finbarr's	Cork Athletic Grounds, Cork

=== Semi-finals ===
29 May 1910 Semi-final	Dungourney	2-03 - 1-02	Sarsfields	Carrigtwohill Enclosure, Carrigtwohill

19 June 1910 Semi-final	Blackrock	4-01 - 1-01	Redmonds	Cork Athletic Grounds, Cork

=== Final ===
7 August 1910 Final	Blackrock	6-03 – 3-01	Dungourney	Cork Athletic Grounds, Cork
				Referee: T Irwin (Cork Co. Board)
