= Jim Ronayne =

Irish hurler

Personal information
- Native name: Séamus Ó Rónáin (Irish)
- Born: 31 March 1877 Dungourney, County Cork, Ireland
- Died: 6 August 1936 (aged 59) Dungourney, County Cork, Ireland
- Occupation: Farmer

Sport
- Sport: Hurling
- Position: Forward
Club
- Years: Club
- Dungourney
Club titles
- Cork titles: 3
Inter-county
- Years: County
- 1900-1912: Cork
Inter-county titles
- Munster titles: 7
- All-Irelands: 2

James William Ronayne (31 March 1877 – 6 August 1936) was an Irish hurler who played for the Cork senior team.

Ronayne joined the team during the 1902 championship and was a regular member of the starting fifteen until his retirement after the 1912 championship. During that time he won one All-Ireland medal and six Munster medals.

At club level Ronayne was a three-time county club championship medal winner with Dungourney.
