= 1907 Cork Senior Hurling Championship =

Annual hurling competition season

- Champions: Dungourney (2nd title); Jamesy Kelleher (captain)
- Runners-up: Castletownroche

The 1907 Cork Senior Hurling Championship was the 20th staging of the Cork Senior Hurling Championship since its establishment by the Cork County Board in 1887.

St. Finbarr's were the defending champions.

Dungourney won the championship following a 5–17 to 0–3 defeat of Castletownroche in the final. This was their second championship title overall and their first title in five championship seasons.

== Results ==
Final

26 January 1908 Final	Dungourney	5-17 – 0-03	Castletownroche	Cork Athletic Grounds, Cork
