= James Delea =

Irish hurler

Personal information
- Native name: Séamus Ó Duilé (Irish)
- Born: 1868 Wales
- Died: 10 July 1950 (aged 82) South Douglas Road, Cork, Ireland
- Occupation: Brewery labourer

Sport
- Sport: Hurling
- Position: Forward
Club
- Years: Club
- Blackrock
Inter-county
- Years: County
- 1891-1897: Cork
Inter-county titles
- Munster titles: 2
- All-Irelands: 2

James Delea (1868 - 10 July 1950) was an Irish hurler who played as a forward for the Cork senior team. He was born in Wales.

Delea made his first appearance for the team during the 1891 championship and was a regular member of the starting seventeen until his retirement after the 1897 championship. During that time he won two All-Ireland medals and two Munster medals.

At club level Delea won multiple county club championship medals with Blackrock.
