= 1902 Cork Senior Hurling Championship =

Annual hurling competition season

- Champions: Dungourney (1st title); Jamesy Kelleher (captain)
- Runners-up: Shanballymore; Denis Daly (captain)

The 1902 Cork Senior Hurling Championship was the 16th staging of the Cork Senior Hurling Championship since its establishment by the Cork County Board in 1887.

Redmonds were the defending champions.

Dungourney won the championship following a 3–10 to 2–5 defeat of Shanballymore in the final. This was their first championship title.

== Results ==
Final

3 May 1903 Final	Dungourney	3-10 – 2-05	Shanballymore	Turners Cross, Cork

== Championship statistics ==
=== Miscellaneous ===
- Dungourney win their first senior title.
- Dungourney are the first non city club to win the title since 1896
- Shanballymore qualify for the final for the first, and to date last, final.
- Following their county championship success, Dungourney represent Cork in the inter-county championship. They become the fifth Cork team to win the All-Ireland title.
