= John Barry-Murphy =

Irish hurler

Personal information
- Native name: Seán de Barra-Murchu (Irish)
- Born: 7 January 1892 Cloughduv, County Cork, Ireland
- Died: 6 January 1975 (aged 82) Bon Secours Hospital, Cork, Ireland

Sport
- Sport: Hurling
- Position: Corner-back
Clubs
- Years: Club
- 1910s-1920s 1920s-1940s: Cloughduv; Éire Óg
Club titles
- Cork titles: 1
Inter-county
- Years: County
- 1910s-1920s: Cork
Inter-county titles
- Munster titles: 2
- All-Irelands: 1

John Barry-Murphy (7 January 1892 – 6 January 1975) was an Irish sportsperson. He played hurling at various times with his local clubs Cloughduv and Éire Óg and was a member of the Cork senior inter-county team in the 1910s and 1920s.

== Playing career ==
=== Club ===
Barry-Murphy began his hurling career as a member of his local Cloughduv team. Cloughduv and the Bride Valley Club merged in 1928 to form the Éire Óg club. That year Barry-Murphy won his sole senior county championship winners' medal.

=== Inter-county ===
Barry-Murphy first came to prominence on the inter-county scene as a member of the Cork junior hurling team in 1916. That year he captured a Munster title following a 6-0 t 4–1 defeat of Tipperary. The subsequent All-Ireland final pitted Cork against Kilkenny. An exciting game developed, however, the long whistle Cork were the champions by 4–6 to 3–4, giving Barry-Murphy an All-Ireland junior winners' medal.

Barry-Murphy later joined the Cork senior team. In 1919 he won his first Munster winners' medal following a provincial final defeat of Limerick. The All-Ireland final saw Cork line out against Dublin. 'The Rebels' were coasting at half-time with Jimmy Kennedy havings scored four goals. He had two more disallowed to give his side a 4–2 to 1–1 lead. Cork ploughed on in the second half to secure a 6–4 to 2–4 victory. This victory gave Barry-Murphy an All-Ireland winners' medal. This was also the first occasion that Cork wore their distinctive red jerseys. The old saffron and blue jerseys had been seized by the British before the game so alternative arrangements had to be made.

In 1920 Barry-Murphy won a second and final Munster title following another victory over Limerick. A second All-Ireland final appearance beckoned, however, Barry-Murphy played no part. Cork failed to retain their title as a goal blitz by Joe Phelan, Jimmy Walsh and Mick Neville gave Dublin a 4–9 to 4–3 victory.

== Sources ==
- Corry, Eoghan, The GAA Book of Lists (Hodder Headline Ireland, 2005).
- Cronin, Jim, A Rebel Hundred: Cork's 100 All-Ireland Titles.
- Donegan, Des, The Complete Handbook of Gaelic Games (DBA Publications Limited, 2005).
