= 1908 Cork Senior Hurling Championship =

Annual hurling competition season

- Champions: Blackrock (10th title); Tom Coughlan (captain)
- Runners-up: Midleton

The 1908 Cork Senior Hurling Championship was the 21st staging of the Cork Senior Hurling Championship since its establishment by the Cork County Board in 1887.

Dungourney were the defending champions.

Blackrock won the championship following a 4–11 to 2–3 defeat of Midleton in the final. This was their 10th championship title overall and their first title in five championship seasons.

== Results ==
=== Semi-finals ===
| 11 October 1908 Semi-final | Blackrock | 3-08 - 0-06 | St. Finbarr's | Cork Athletic Grounds |

=== Final ===
| 18 October 1908 Final | Blackrock | 4-11 - 2-03 | Midleton | Carrignafoy Ground |

=== Miscellaneous ===
- Midleton qualify for the final for the first time.
