= 1923 Cork Senior Hurling Championship =

Annual hurling competition season

- Teams: 14
- Champions: St. Finbarr’s (7th title); Maurice O'Brien (captain)
- Runners-up: Blackrock; Seán Óg Murphy (captain)

The 1923 Cork Senior Hurling Championship was the 35th staging of the Cork Senior Hurling Championship since its establishment by the Cork County Board in 1887. The draw for the opening round fixtures took place on 18 April 1923.

St. Finbarr's were the defending champions.

On 9 September 1923, St. Finbarr's won the championship following a 0–05 to 1–02 defeat of Blackrock in the final. This was their seventh championship title overall and their second title in succession.

== Results ==
=== Semi-finals ===
19 August 1923 Semi-final	Blackrock	4-05 - 2-02	Castletreasure	Cork Athletic Grounds

19 August 1923 Semi-final	St. Finbarr's	3-04 - 0-01	St Mary's	Cork Athletic Grounds

=== Final ===
9 September 1923 Final	St. Finbarr’s	0-05 – 1-02	Blackrock	Cork Athletic Grounds
