= 1922 Cork Senior Hurling Championship =

Annual hurling competition season

- Champions: St. Finbarr’s (6th title); Jack Dorney (captain)
- Runners-up: Blackrock; Matt Murphy (captain)

The 1922 Cork Senior Hurling Championship was the 34th staging of the Cork Senior Hurling Championship since its establishment by the Cork County Board in 1887. It was the first championship to be played since 1920 because of the Anglo-Irish War.

Blackrock were the defending champions.

St. Finbarr's won the championship following a walkover from Blackrock in the final. This was their sixth championship title overall and their first title in three years.

== Results ==
=== Semi-finals ===
29 October 1922 Semi-final	St. Finbarr's	7-04 - 2-01	Redmonds	Cork Athletic Grounds, Cork

12 November 1922 Semi-final	Blackrock	6-03 - 1-01	Sarsfields	Cork Athletic Grounds, Cork

=== Final ===
Final	St. Finbarr’s	w/o – scr.	Blackrock
