= 2025 Cork Intermediate A Hurling Championship =

Annual hurling competition season

- Dates: 2 August – 16 November 2025
- Teams: 12
- Sponsor: Co-Op Superstores
- Champions: Aghabullogue (3rd title); Paul Ring (captain); Micheál McGrath (manager)
- Runners-up: Bandon; Michael Cahalane (captain); Joe Burke (manager)
- Relegated: Mayfield

Tournament statistics
- Matches played: 24
- Goals scored: 77 (3.21 per match)
- Points scored: 817 (34.04 per match)
- Top scorer(s): Matthew Bradley (3-45)

The 2025 Cork Intermediate A Hurling Championship was the sixth staging of the Cork Intermediate A Hurling Championship and the 116th staging overall of a championship for lower-ranking intermediate hurling teams in Cork. The draw for the group stage placings took place on 10 December 2024. The championship ran from 2 August to 16 November 2025.

The final was played on 16 November 2025 at SuperValu Páirc Uí Chaoimh in Cork, between Aghabullogue and Bandon, in what was their first ever meeting in the final. Aghabullogue won the match by 1-21 to 0-23 to claim their third championship title overall and a first title in two years.

Aghabullogue's Matthew Bradley was the championship's top scorer with 3-45.

== Team changes ==
=== To Championship ===
Relegated from the Cork Premier Intermediate Hurling Championship

- Aghabullogue

Promoted from the Cork Premier Junior Hurling Championship

- Russell Rovers

=== From Championship ===
Promoted to the Cork Premier Intermediate Hurling Championship

- Lisgoold

Relegated to the Cork Premier Junior Hurling Championship

- Cloughduv

== Group A ==
=== Group A table ===
Quarter-finalist Relegation playoff

Team	Matches				Score			Pts
Team	Pld	W	D	L	For	Against	Diff	Pts
Bandon	3	2	0	1	73	60	13	4
Midleton	3	2	0	1	67	58	9	4
Russell Rovers	3	2	0	1	73	67	6	4
Mayfield	3	0	0	3	52	80	-28	0

=== Group A results ===
3 August 2025 Round 1	Midleton	0-22 - 0-16	Mayfield	Riverstown Sportsfield
	A Mulcahy 0-13, C Beausang 0-3, P Connaughton 0-2, K Farmer 0-2.	Report	N Kelly 0-9, S O’Donovan 0-4.

3 August 2025 Round 1	Bandon	3-18 - 0-19	Russell Rovers	Riverstick Grounds
	M Cahalane 0-8, C McCarthy 0-3, C Lyons 0-2.	Report	J Beausang 0-12, C Aherne 0-2.

17 August 2025 Round 2	Midleton	1-20 - 1-15	Bandon	Church Road
	A Mulcahy 0-7, E McGrath 1-1, A Daly 0-3, P Haughney 0-3, C Morley 0-2, K Farmer 0-1, S O'Sullivan 0-1, T Dunlea 0-1.	Report	M Cahalane 0-5, C Long 0-4 C McCarthy 1-0, J Cullinane 0-2, D Crowley 0-2, C Calnan 0-1, C Lynch 0-1.

17 August 2025 Round 2	Russell Rovers	5-15 - 2-12	Mayfield	Caherlag Grounds
	B Hartnett 3-3, J Beausang 1-8, C Ahearne 1-0, C Sheehan 0-2.	Report	N Kelly 1-10, C O’Donovan 1-1.

6 September 2025 Round 3	Mayfield	1-15 - 1-25	Bandon	Ballinhassig Grounds
	S O’Donovan (0-4 f), N Kelly (0-5 f) 0-5 each, K Punch 1-0, D Malone, D O’Neill 0-2 each, MJ Coffey 0-1.	Report	M Cahalane 0-12 (0-3 65’, 0-5 f), J Cullinane 1-2, M Sugrue 0-3, C Long, C Calnan, D Crowley 0-2 each, E McSweeney, R Fogarty 0-1 each.

6 September 2025 Round 3	Midleton	2-16 - 2-18	Russell Rovers	Castlemartyr Grounds
	E Fraser, C Morley 1-0 each, A Mulcahy 0-8 (0-6f) C Crowley 0-3, P Haughney 0-2 (0-1/65) C Beausang, K Burke, E McGrath 0-1 each.	Report	J Beausang 1-11 (0-9f), B Hartnett 1-3, L Duggan 0-2, F Murray, C Sheehan 0-1 each.

== Group B ==
=== Group B table ===
Semi-finalist Quarter-finalist Relegation playoff

Team	Matches				Score			Pts
Team	Pld	W	D	L	For	Against	Diff	Pts
Sarsfields	3	3	0	0	75	51	24	6
Aghabullogue	3	2	0	1	74	55	19	4
Blackrock	3	0	1	2	58	73	-16	1
Youghal	3	0	1	2	57	84	-27	1

=== Group B results ===
2 August 2025 Round 1	Sarsfields	3-22 - 0-15	Youghal	Cloyne Grounds
	B O’Flynn 0-8, Daniel Kearney 0-7, R O’Brien 2-0, D Long 1-2.	Report	B Malone 0-9, R McMahon 0-3.

3 August 2025 Round 1	Aghabullogue	2-21 - 1-13	Blackrock	Páirc Uí Chonchuir
	M Bradley 0-7, J Lane 1-3, L Casey 1-2, J Corkery 0-3, S Tarrant 0-3.	Report

16 August 2025 Round 2	Youghal	2-11 - 2-22	Aghabullogue	Páirc Liosgcúl
		Report	M Bradley 1-8, J Corkery 1-1, O O’Connell 0-4, L Casey 0-3, S Tarrant 0-2, J Foley 0-2.

17 August 2025 Round 2	Blackrock	1-14 - 0-22	Sarsfields	Whitechurch Grounds
	C Cormack 1-0.	Report	B O’Flynn 0-13, D Kearney 0-4.

6 September 2025 Round 3	Aghabullogue	2-13 - 3-13	Sarsfields	Ballymah Grounds
	M Bradley 2-3.	Report

6 September 2025 Round 3	Blackrock	3-16 - 4-13	Youghal	Páirc Uí Chonaill
		Report

== Group C ==
=== Group C table ===
Semi-finalist Quarter-finalist

Team	Matches				Score			Pts
Team	Pld	W	D	L	For	Against	Diff	Pts
Aghada	3	2	1	0	81	60	21	5
Erin's Own	3	2	0	1	63	69	-6	4
Kildorrery	3	0	2	1	59	62	-3	2
Ballygiblin	3	0	1	2	61	73	-12	1

=== Group C results ===
3 August 2025 Round 1	Aghada	1-22 - 2-19	Kildorrery	Páirc Uí Rinn
	W Leahy 0-12, F O'Connor 1-2, J O'Hanlon 0-2, C Terry 0-1, R Murphy 0-1, N Devoy 0-1, M McCarthy 0-1, M Russell 0-1, R O'Connell 0-1.		L Keating 1-2, P O'Brien 0-5, K Hurley 1-0, S Fitzgerald 0-3, T O'Sullivan 0-2, D Kelly 0-2, J Hunter 0-2, J McEniry 0-1, D Kent 0-1.

3 August 2025 Round 1	Ballygiblin	2-18 - 2-22	Erin's Own	Castlelyons Grounds
	D Flynn 0-8, S O'Sullivan 2-0, S Beston 0-3, J O'Sullivan 0-3, C Walsh 0-2, E Flynn 0-1, K Roche 0-1.	Report	Ó O'Regan 1-6, K Murphy 0-6, S Irwin 1-2, A O'Sullivan 0-3, W Fenton 0-2, I O'Mahony 0-1, S Power 0-1, R Blackton 0-1.

15 August 2025 Round 2	Erin's Own	0-17 - 1-27	Aghada	Páirc Séamus de Barra
		Report	W Leahy (0-10, 9F), P O’Neill (1-1), J O’Hanlon (0-4), C Terry (0-4), R Murphy (0-3), R O’Connell (0-2), N Devoy (0-1), J Looney (0-1), S O’Driscoll (0-1).

17 August 2025 Round 2	Kildorrery	1-16 - 0-19	Ballygiblin	Glanworth Grounds
	P O’Brien 0-5, J McEniry 1-1, J Keating 0-4, D Kelly 0-2, L Keating 0-2, D Kent 0-2.	Report	D O’Flynn 0-9, S Beston 0-3, A O’Brien 0-3, J O'Sullivan 0-2, C Walsh 0-1, S O'Sullivan 0-1.

6 September 2025 Round 3	Erin's Own	2-12 - 0-15	Kildorrery	Jamesy Kelleher Memorial Park
	K Murphy 1-7, A O'Sullivan 1-2, J Kavanagh 0-2, C O'Mahony 0-1.	Report	L Keating 0-6, P O'Brien 0-2, J Keating 0-2, M Walsh 0-1, J Hunter 0-1, C Kent 0-1, F Stapleton 0-1, C Coughlan 0-1.

6 September 2025 Round 3	Ballygiblin	1-15 - 2-20	Aghada	Páirc Uí Rinn
	D Flynn 0-8 (0-6 f), D Barry 1-1, J O’Sullivan 0-2; R Donegan, C O’Mahony, S Beston, C Walsh 0-1 each.	Report	W Leahy 1-4 (1-1 f, 0-1 65), F O’Connor 1-0, N Devoy, C Terry, R Murphy 0-3 each, J O’Hanlon, P O’Neill, J Looney 0-2 each, T Hartnett 0-1.

== Relegation stage ==
=== Relegation playoff ===
19 September 2025 Playoff	Mayfield	1-16 - 3-14	Youghal	Ovens Grounds
	N Kelly 0-10 (0-7 f, 0-3 65), C O’Donovan 1-1, E Scanlon 0-2, D O’Neill, K Punch, L Malone 0-1 each.	Report	J Murray 0-6 (0-4 f), O Hill 1-3, B Cooper 1-1, C Coleman Butler 1-0, B Lynch, A Frahill O’Connor 0-1 each, O Walsh 0-2 f.

== Knockout stage ==
=== Bracket ===
Quarter-Finals
Bandon (Carbery)	3–19
Erin's Own (Imokilly)	4–10
Aghabullogue (Muskerry)	1–19
Midleton (Imokilly)	1–12

Semi-Finals
Sarsfields (Imokilly)	0–08
Bandon (Carbery)	0–10
Aghada (Imokilly)	3–19
Aghabullogue (Muskerry)	5–18

Final
Bandon (Carbery)	0-23
Aghabullogue (Muskerry)	1-21

=== Quarter-finals ===
20 September 2025 Quarter-final	Bandon	3-19 - 4-10	Erin's Own	Ballinhassig Grounds
	M Cahalane 0-12 (0-8 f, 0-1 45), J Cullinane 1-3, S Carey 1-2, E McSweeney 1-1, C Long 0-1.	Report	C Lenihan 2-1, R Blackton 1-2, G O’Mahony 1-0, K Murphy 0-3 f, W Fenton 0-2, D Collins 0-2.

20 September 2025 Quarter-final	Aghabullogue	1-19 - 1-12	Midleton	Carrignavar Grounds
	M Bradley 0-6 (0-4 f), J Lane 1-1, S Tarrant 0-3, J Foley, L Casey, J Corkery 0-2 each, S Furey, O O’Connell 0-1 each.	Report	A Mulcahy 0-7 (0-5 f), A Daly 1-0, P Haughney 0-2, C Crowley, S O’Farrell, C Beausang 0-1 each.

=== Semi-finals ===
4 October 2025 Semi-final	Sarsfields	0-08 - 0-10	Bandon	Riverstick Grounds
	R O’Brien 0-2 (0-1 f, 0-1 65), L Hackett 0-2, K Crowley, D Long, A Hackett, S McNamara 0-1 each.	Report	M Cahalane 0-5 (0-3 f, 0-1 65), J Cullinane 0-2, C Calnan, D Crowley, M Sugrue 0-1 each.

4 October 2025 Semi-final	Aghada	3-19 - 5-18 (aet)	Aghabullogue	Páirc Dhónaill Uí Cheallacháin
	W Leahy (0-9, 0-7 frees, 0-1 65), J O’Hanlon and F O’Connor (1-2 each), C Terry (1-1), M McCarthy (0-2, 0-1 65), T Hartnett, R O’Connell and R Murphy (0-1 each).	Report	M Bradley (0-10, 0-5 frees), J Lane (2-1), L Casey (1-3), Odhran O’Connell (1-2), J Foley (1-1), S Tarrant (0-1).

=== Final ===
16 November 2025 Final	Bandon	0-23 - 1-21	Aghabullogue	SuperValu Páirc Ui Chaoimh
	M Cahalane 0-11 (0-6 f, 0-1 65), C Long, K Hannon, E McSweeney 0-2 each, C Lynch, P Murphy, C McCarthy, D Crowley, J Cullinane, S Carey 0-1 each.	Report	M Bradley 0-11 (0-7 f), J Lane 1-1, L Casey 0-3, J Corkery, D Dineen 0-2 each, S Furey, O O’Connell 0-1 each.

== Championship statistics ==
=== Top scorers ===
Rank	Player	Club	Tally	Total	Matches	Average
1	Matthew Bradley	Aghabullogue	3-45	54	6	9.00
2	Michael Cahalane	Bandon	0-53	53	6	8.83
3	Willie Leahy	Aghada	1-35	38	4	9.50
4	Josh Beausang	Russell Rovers	2-31	37	3	12.33
4	Nicky Kelly	Mayfield	1-34	37	4	9.25
6	Aaron Mulcahy	Midleton	0-35	35	4	8.75
7	Darragh Flynn	Ballygiblin	0-25	25	3	8.33

=== Miscellaneous ===
- The result of the initial Group C game between Aghada and Kildorrery was declared void and a replay ordered because of a discrepancy regarding the score. A further appeal by Aghada to the Munster Council was upheld and the original result of a draw was restored and the refixture cancelled.
