= Jackie Linehan =

Irish hurler

Personal information
- Native name: Seán Ó Loingeacháin (Irish)
- Nickname: Jackie
- Born: 28 October 1864 Aghabullogue, County Cork, Ireland
- Died: 8 March 1944 (aged 79) Cork District Hospital, Cork, Ireland
- Occupation: Labourer

Sport
- Sport: Hurling
- Position: Full-forward
Club
- Years: Club
- Aghabullogue
Club titles
- Cork titles: 1
Inter-county*
Years	County	Apps (scores)
1890	Cork	2
Inter-county titles
- Munster titles: 1
- All-Irelands: 1
- *Inter County team apps and scores correct as of 10:50, 9 March 2019.

Jackie Linehan (28 October 1864 – 8 March 1944) was an Irish hurler who played for Cork Championship club Aghabullogue. He played for the Cork senior hurling team for one season, during which time he usually lined out as a full-forward.

== Playing career ==
=== Aghabullogue ===
Linehan joined the Aghabullogue club when it was founded and quickly became one of the club's top scoring forwards. On 13 July 1890, he lined out when Aghabullogue defeated Aghada by 7–03 to 1–01 to win the Cork Championship.

=== Cork ===
Linehan made his first appearance for the Cork hurling team on 29 September 1890. He lined out in the forwards as Cork defeated Kerry by 2–00 to 0–01 to win the Munster Championship. Linehan was again in the forward line on 16 November when Cork defeated Wexford by 1–06 to 2–02 in the All-Ireland final.

== Honours ==
Aghabullogue

- Cork Senior Hurling Championship (1): 1890

Cork

- All-Ireland Senior Hurling Championship (1): 1890
- Munster Senior Hurling Championship (1): 1890
