= Dan Drew (hurler) =

Irish hurler

Personal information
- Native name: Dónall Ó Draoi (Irish)
- Born: 1863 Aghabullogue, County Cork, Ireland
- Died: 8 July 1923 (aged 59–60) Carrigrohane, County Cork, Ireland
- Occupation: Railway guard

Sport
- Sport: Hurling
- Position: Forward
Club
- Years: Club
- Aghabullogue
Club titles
- Cork titles: 1
Inter-county
Years	County	Apps (scores)
1892-1894	Cork	4
Inter-county titles
- Munster titles: 2
- All-Irelands: 2

Daniel Drew (c.1863 – 8 July 1923) was an Irish hurler. At club level he played with Aghabullogue and at inter-county level with the Cork senior hurling team.

== Career ==
Born and raised in the townland of Clonmoyle near Coachford, County Cork, Drew first played hurling with the nearby Aghabullogue club. He was part of the team that won, what remains, the club's only Cork SHC title, following a 7–03 to 1–01 win over Aghada in 1890.

Aghabullogue were the Cork representatives at inter-county level as a result of this win. Drew subsequently claimed his first Munster SHC medal, after beating Kerry by 2–00 to 0–01 in the final. This win qualified Cork for the 1890 All-Ireland SHC final against Wexford. The game was marred by ill-tempered behaviour and ‘alleged excessively rough play’, with one of the Cork players having his toe broken by one of the Wexford players. Team captain Dan Lane withdrew his players from the game, with the referee's permission. Wexford had been leading by 2–02 to 1–06 at the time, however, the game was recorded as 'unfinished' and Cork were subsequently awarded the title, with Drew collecting his first winners' medal.

Two years later, Drew was included as part of the Redmonds selection that represented Cork. He won a second Munster SHC medal that year, before claiming his second All-Ireland SHC medal, following a 2–03 to 1–05 win over Dublin in the final. Drew, along with his team mate Pat Buckley, became the first players to win two All-Ireland medals on the field of play.

== Personal life and death ==
Drew worked as a guard with the Cork and Muskerry Light Railway. On 8 July 1923, he was killed after falling from a train near Tower, County Cork.

== Honours ==
Aghabullogue

- Cork Senior Hurling Championship (1): 1890

Cork

- All-Ireland Senior Hurling Championship (2): 1890, 1892
- Munster Senior Hurling Championship (2): 1890, 1892
