= Jeremiah Hinchion =

Irish hurler

Personal information
- Native name: Diarmuid Ó hInse (Irish)
- Nickname: Jer
- Born: 23 December 1865 Aghabullogue, County Cork, Ireland
- Died: 8 September 1938 (aged 72) St. Finbarr's Hospital, Cork, Ireland
- Occupation: Farmer

Sport
- Sport: Hurling
Club
- Years: Club
- Aghabullogue
Club titles
- Cork titles: 1
Inter-county*
Years	County	Apps (scores)
1890	Cork	2 (0-00)
Inter-county titles
- Munster titles: 1
- All-Irelands: 1
- *Inter County team apps and scores correct as of 18:50, 8 March 2019.

Jeremiah Hichion (23 December 1865 – 8 September 1938) was an Irish hurler who played for Cork Championship club Aghabullogue. He played for the Cork senior hurling team for one season.

== Playing career ==
=== Aghabullogue ===
Hinchion joined the Aghabullogue club when it was founded in the early years of the Gaelic Athletic Association. On 13 July 1890, he lined out for the team when Aghabullogue defeated Aghada by 7–03 to 1–01 to win the Cork Championship.

=== Cork ===
Hinchion made his first appearance for the Cork hurling team on 29 September 1890. He lined out on the team as Cork defeated Kerry by 2–00 to 0–01 to win the Munster Championship. Hinchion was again on the team on 16 November when Cork defeated Wexford by 1–06 to 2–02 in the All-Ireland final.

== Honours ==
Aghabullogue

- Cork Senior Hurling Championship (1): 1890

Cork

- All-Ireland Senior Hurling Championship (1): 1890
- Munster Senior Hurling Championship (1): 1890
