= John Buckley (Aghabullogue hurler) =

Irish hurler

Personal information
- Native name: Seán Ó Buachalla (Irish)
- Born: 1863 Coachford, County Cork, Ireland
- Died: 10 September 1935 (aged 72) St. Finbarr's Hospital, Cork, Ireland
- Occupation: Railway porter

Sport
- Sport: Hurling
- Position: Goalkeeper
Club
- Years: Club
- Aghabullogue
Club titles
- Cork titles: 1
Inter-county*
Years	County	Apps (scores)
1890	Cork	2 (0-00)
Inter-county titles
- Munster titles: 1
- All-Irelands: 1
- *Inter County team apps and scores correct as of 18:50, 8 March 2019.

John Buckley (1863 - 10 September 1935) was an Irish hurler who played for Cork Championship club Aghabullogue. He played for the Cork senior hurling team for one season, during which time he usually lined out as a goalkeeper.

== Playing career ==
=== Aghabullogue ===
Buckley joined the Aghabullogue club when it was founded and quickly became the club's goalkeeper. On 13 July 1890, Buckley was in goal when Aghabullogue defeated Aghada by 7-03 to 1-01 to win the Cork Championship.

=== Cork ===
Buckley made his first appearance for the Cork hurling team on 29 September 1890. He lined out in goal as Cork defeated Kerry by 2-00 to 0-01 to win the Munster Championship. Buckley was again in goal on 16 November when Cork defeated Wexford by 1-06 to 2-02 in the All-Ireland final.

== Career statistics ==
Team	Year	Munster		All-Ireland		Total	
Team	Year	Apps	Score	Apps	Score	Apps	Score
Cork	1890	1	0-00	1	0-00	2	0-00
Career total		1	0-00	1	0-00	2	0-00

== Honours ==
Aghabullogue

- Cork Senior Hurling Championship (1): 1890

Cork

- All-Ireland Senior Hurling Championship (1): 1890
- Munster Senior Hurling Championship (1): 1890
