= Thady Kelleher =

Irish hurler

Personal information
- Native name: Tadhg Céilleachair (Irish)
- Nickname: Thady
- Born: 1862 Aghabullogue, County Cork, Ireland
- Died: 27 March 1944 (aged 82) Banteer, County Cork, Ireland
- Occupation: Farmer

Sport
- Sport: Hurling
Club
- Years: Club
- Aghabullogue
Club titles
- Cork titles: 1
Inter-county*
Years	County	Apps (scores)
1890	Cork	1 (0-00)
Inter-county titles
- Munster titles: 1
- All-Irelands: 1
- *Inter County team apps and scores correct as of 18:50, 8 March 2019.

Timothy Kelleher (1862 - 27 March 1944) was an Irish hurler who played for Cork Championship club Aghabullogue. He played for the Cork senior hurling team for one season.

== Playing career ==
=== Aghabullogue ===
Kelleher joined the Aghabullogue club when it was founded in the early years of the Gaelic Athletic Association. On 13 July 1890, Kelleher lined out for the team when Aghabullogue defeated Aghada by 7-03 to 1-01 to win the Cork Championship.

=== Cork ===
Kelleher made his only appearance for the Cork hurling team on 16 November 1890 when Cork defeated Wexford by 1-06 to 2-02 in the All-Ireland final.

== Honours ==
Aghabullogue

- Cork Senior Hurling Championship (1): 1890

Cork

- All-Ireland Senior Hurling Championship (1): 1890
- Munster Senior Hurling Championship (1): 1890
