= 2023 Cork Intermediate A Hurling Championship =

- Dates: 4 August - 22 October 2023
- Teams: 12
- Sponsor: Co-Op Superstores
- Champions: Aghabullogue (2nd title); Shane Tarrant (captain); Micheál McGrath (manager)
- Runners-up: Midleton; James Nagle (captain)
- Relegated: Douglas

Tournament statistics
- Matches played: 24
- Goals scored: 65 (2.71 per match)
- Points scored: 780 (32.5 per match)
- Top scorer(s): Aaron Mulcahy (1-52)

The 2023 Cork Intermediate A Hurling Championship was the fourth staging of the Cork Intermediate A Hurling Championship and the 114th staging overall of a championship for lower-ranking intermediate hurling teams in Cork. The draw for the group stage placings took place on 11 December 2022. The championship ran from 4 August to 22 October 2023.

The final was played on 22 October 2023 at Páirc Uí Chaoimh in Cork, between Aghabullogue and Midleton, in what was their first ever meeting in the final. Aghabullogue won the match by 3-17 to 2-19 to claim their second championship title overall and a first title in 113 years.

Midleton's Aaron Mulcahy was the championship's top scorer with 1-52.

== Team changes ==
=== To Championship ===
Promoted from the Cork Premier Junior Hurling Championship

- Ballygiblin

Relegated from the Cork Premier Intermediate Hurling Championship

- Youghal

=== From Championship ===
Promoted to the Cork Premier Intermediate Hurling Championship

- Dungourney

Relegated to the Cork Premier Junior Hurling Championship

- Meelin

== Group A ==
=== Group A table ===
Knockout stage Relegation playoff

Team	Matches				Score			Pts
Team	Pld	W	D	L	For	Against	Diff	Pts
Aghabullogue	3	2	1	0	71	59	12	5
Lisgoold	3	1	1	1	62	62	0	3
Aghada	3	1	1	1	66	59	7	3
Youghal	3	0	1	2	50	69	-19	1

=== Group A results ===
4 August 2023 Round 1	Youghal	0-17 - 0-17	Lisgoold	Castlemartyr Grounds
	J Murray (0-6 frees), D O'Donoghue (0-4, 0-1sl, 0-1f, 0-1 65), B Moloney (0-3, 0-1f), C O'Mahony (0-1), C Geary (0-1), S Smiddy (0-1), O Hill (0-1).		M Hegarty 0-4, J Cronin, D Healy (0-1f) J Cashman (0-1f), L O’Shea (0-1 sideline) 0-2 each, L Walsh, J O’Driscoll, D O’Brien, C O’Brien, K Cashman 0-1 each.

6 August 2023 Round 1	Aghada	1-17 - 1-17	Aghabullogue	Páirc Uí Rinn
	W Leahy 0-11.	Report	S Tarrant 0-8.

12 August 2023 Round 2	Lisgoold	2-17 - 0-22	Aghada	Dungourney Grounds
	J Cashman 0-8, D Healy 1-2, J O'Driscoll 1-0, M Hegarty 0-2.	Report	C Terry 0-6, W Leahy 0-6, P O'Neill 0-2.

13 August 2023 Round 2	Aghabullogue	2-22 - 1-14	Youghal	Páirc Uí Rinn
	S Tarrant 1-6, M Bradley 0-8, J Foley 1-1.

2 September 2023 Round 3	Lisgoold	1-19 - 2-17	Aghabullogue	Caherlag Grounds
	J Cashman 0-10, M Hegarty 1-1.	Report	J Corkery 2-4, S Tarrant 0-7.

2 September 2023 Round 3	Youghal	1-13 - 1-21	Aghada	Fr O'Neill's Grounds
		Report	W Leahy 1-11, R O’Connell 0-2, F O’Connor 0-2, M Russell 0-2, M McCarthy 0-2.

== Group B ==
=== Group B table ===
Knockout stage

Team	Matches				Score			Pts
Team	Pld	W	D	L	For	Against	Diff	Pts
Blackrock	3	2	1	0	67	62	5	5
Mayfield	3	2	1	0	65	59	2	5
Sarsfields	3	0	1	1	54	59	-5	1
Kildorrery	3	0	1	2	61	67	-6	1

=== Group B results ===
5 August 2023 Round 1	Mayfield	1-16 - 1-16	Blackrock	Ballinlough Grounds
		Report	R Sweeney 0–8 (5), D O'Farrell 0–4, D Browne 1–0, F Coleman 0–3, J Golden 0–1.

6 August 2023 Round 1	Sarsfields	1-13 - 1-13	Kildorrery	Glanworth Grounds
	S O'Regan 1-5, A Hackett 0-2, B Nodwell 0-2, E O'Sullivan 0-2, T Óg Murphy 0-1, D Walsh 0-1.	Report	P Pigott 1-2, P O'Brien 0-8, L Keating 0-2, J Keating 0-1.

13 August 2023 Round 2	Blackrock	1-19 - 1-16	Sarsfields	Páirc Uí Rinn
	R Sweeney 0–5 (5f), T Grainger 1–1, S Healy 0–4 (2f), J O'Sullivan 0–4, I O'Keeffe 0–2, E Smith 0–1, E Cantwell 0–1, F Coleman 0–1.	Report

13 August 2023 Round 2	Kildorrery	0-21 - 3-16	Mayfield	Felix Sarsfield Memorial Park
	P O'Brien 0-7, J Keating 0-6, L Keating 0-3, D Kelly 0-2, T Condon 0-1, K Hurley 0-1, M Walsh 0-1.		N Kelly 0-8, D O'Neill 1-2, P Duggan 1-1, T Horgan 1-0, S O'Donovan 0-3, M Coffey 0-1, S Kelly 0-1.

2 September 2023 Round 3	KIldorrery	1-21 - 3-17	Blackrock	O'Connell Park
	P O'Brien 0-7, D Kelly 1-1, J Keating 0-4, P Pigott 0-3, L Keating 0-2, W Fouhy 0-1, M Walsh 0-1, K Hurley 0-1, T Condon 0-1.		F Coleman 3-3, E O'Farrell 0-7, D O'Farrell 0-2, R Sweeney 0-2, T Grainer 0-2, R Laide 0-1.

2 September 2023 Round 3	Sarsfields	3-10 - 2-15	Mayfield	Carraig na bhFear Grounds
	S O’Regan 2-1 (1-0 f), B Nodwell 1-4, J O’Leary 0-2, B Graham 0-2, A Hackett 0-1.	Report	N Kelly 0-7 (0-3 f), M J Coffey 1-1, T Horgan 1-0, D O’Neill 0-3, D O’Donovan, S O’Donovan (f), K Punch, D Malone (0-1 each).	Referee: I McCarthy (Bandon)

== Group C ==
=== Group C table ===
Knockout stage Relegation playoff

Team	Matches				Score			Pts
Team	Pld	W	D	L	For	Against	Diff	Pts
Midleton	3	3	0	0	60	50	10	6
Ballygiblin	3	2	0	1	58	58	0	4
Cloughduv	3	1	0	2	60	60	0	2
Douglas	3	0	0	3	47	57	-10	0

=== Group C results ===
6 August 2023 Round 1	Douglas	1-10 - 1-12	Ballygiblin	Páirc Lios gCúl
	C O'Donovan 0-6, G O'Shea 1-0, S St Ledger 0-2, M Dolan 0-1, R Hanley 0-1.		J O'Sullivan 0-8, S O'Sullivan 1-0, R Donegan 0-1, A O'Brien 0-1, D O'Flynn 0-1, S Beston 0-1.

6 August 2023 Round 1	Cloughduv	1-12 - 2-12	Midleton	Páirc Uí Rinn
	J Devine 0-9, E Macnabolla 1-0, B Macnabolla 0-1, O O'Driscoll 0-1, L Elliot 0-1.		A Quirke 1-2, A Mulcahy 0-5, K Farmer 1-1, C Crowley 0-2, P O'Shea 0-1, T O'Leary-Hayes 0-1.

11 August 2023 Round 2	Midleton	0-15 - 0-14	Douglas	Charlie Hurley Park
	A Mulcahy 0-8 (0-6 frees), G Reddy, T Roche and K Farmer 0-2 each and L Hennessy 0-1.	Report

13 August 2023 Round 2	Ballygiblin	1-19 - 2-12	Cloughduv	Blarney Grounds
	J O'Sullivan 0-9, S O'Sullivan 0-4, C O'Mahony 0-4, S Beston 1-0, D O'Flynn 0-2.		M Verling 1-8, E Clifford 1-0, J Devine 0-2, P O'Driscoll 0-1, B McNabola 0-1.

2 September 2023 Round 3	Midleton	2-21 - 2-15	Ballygiblin	St Catherine's Park
	A Mulcahy 1-12, T Roche 1-0, J Nagle 0-3, D McCarthy 0-2, A Ryan 0-2, P O'Shea 0-1, T O'Leary-Hayes 0-1.		J O'Sullivan 1-6, D Flynn 0-4, C O'Mahony 1-1, S Beston 0-3, K Duggan 0-1.

2 September 2023 Round 3	Cloughduv	3-18 - 2-14	Douglas	Ballincollig Grounds

== Knockout stage ==
=== Bracket ===
Quarter-Finals
Mayfield (Seandun)	1-18
Lisgoold (Imokilly)	0-18
Blackrock (Seandun)	1-20
Ballygiblin (Avondhu)	0-18

Semi-Finals
Aghabullogue (Muskerry)	0-17
Mayfield (Seandun)	0-11
Midleton (Imokilly)	1-18
Blackrock (Seandun)	1-17

Final
Aghabullogue (Muskerry)	3-17
Midleton (Imokilly)	2-19

=== Relegation playoff ===
16 September 2023 Playoff	Youghal	5-17 - 4-12	Douglas	Páirc Séamus de Barra
	D O’Donoghue 2-3, B Moloney 1-5 (0-5 f), B Cooper, R McMahon 1-1 each, J Murray, S Smiddy, J O’Mahony, A Frahill O’Connor, E Cronin, O Hill, C O’Mahony 0-1 each.	Report	F Barry 2-2 (1-2 f), C O’Donovan 1-3, M Dolan 0-3 f, S O’Leary 1-0, C O’Keeffe, E O’Sullivan, D O’Callaghan, N Hartnett 0-1 each.	Referee: B Coniry (Crosshaven)

=== Quarter-finals ===
16 September 2023 Quarter-final	Mayfield	1-18 - 0-18	Lisgoold	Páirc Uí Chonaill
	D O’Neill 1-6, N Kelly 0-7 (0-6 f), D Malone, S O’Donovan 0-2 each, MJ Coffey 0-1.	Report	J Cashman (0-2 f), D Healy 0-5 each, L O’Shea (0-1 f), M Hegarty 0-3 each, J O’Driscoll 0-2.	Referee: I McCarthy (Bandon)

16 September 2023 Quarter-final	Blackrock	1-20 - 0-18	Ballygiblin	Riverstown Sportsfield
	E O’Farrell (0-9, 5f, 1 65), T Grainger 1-0, R Sweeney (0-3, 1f), I O’Keefe (0-2), R Laide, D O Farrell, John O’Sullivan, S Healy, F Coleman, L O’Sullivan (0-1 each).	Report	J O’Sullivan (0-12, 9f, 1 65), S Beston (0-3), P Malloy, K Duggan, D Barry (0-1 each).	Referee: B Sweeney

=== Semi-finals ===
29 September 2023 Semi-final	Midleton	1-18 - 1-17	Blackrock	Páirc Séamus de Barra
	A Mulcahy 0-13 (0-10 f), T O’Leary-Hayes 1-0, T Roche, D McCarthy 0-2 each, L Hennessy 0-1.	Report	R Sweeney 1-4 (1-0 pen, 0-1 f), 0-7 (0-6 f) J O’Sullivan, D O’Farrell 0-2 each, E Smith, S Healy 0-1 each.	Referee: S Scanlon (Newcestown)

29 September 2023 Semi-final	Aghabullogue	0-17 - 0-11	Mayfield	Páirc Uí Rinn
	M Bradley (0-4f), S Tarrant (0-3f) 0-6 each, J Corkery, P Ring 0-2 each, B Dineen 0-1.	Report	N Kelly 0-9 (0-6f, 0-1 65), D Malone, S O’Donovan (0-1f) 0-1 each.	Referee: P Lyons (Bishopstown)

=== Final ===
22 October 2023 Final	Aghabullogue	3-17 - 2-19	Midleton	Páirc Uí Chaoimh
	M Bradley 0-12 (0-8 f), J Corkery 2-0, S Tarrant 1-2, C Gillespie, P Ring, N Barry Murphy 0-1 each.	Report	A Mulcahy 0-14 (0-11 f 0-1 65), K Farmer 1-1, A Quirke 1-0, D McCarthy 0-2, A Ryan, G Reddy 0-1 each.	Referee: P O'Mahony (Kilbrittain)
