= 2023 East Cork Junior A Hurling Championship =

- Dates: 7 August - 22 October 2023
- Teams: 9
- Sponsor: East Cork Oil
- Champions: Carrignavar (3rd title); Paul Sheehan (captain); Liam Ryan (manager)
- Runners-up: St Ita's
- Relegated: Fr O'Neill's; Sarsfields

Tournament statistics
- Matches played: 15
- Goals scored: 36 (2.4 per match)
- Points scored: 465 (31 per match)

The 2023 East Cork Junior A Hurling Championship was the 99th staging of the East Cork Junior A Hurling Championship since its establishment by the East Cork Board in 1925. The draw for the group stage placings took place in January 2023. The championship ran from 7 August to 22 October 2023.

The final was played on 22 October 2023 at Páirc Bhríde in Rathcormac, between Carrignavar and St Ita's, in what was their first ever meeting in the final. Carrignavar won the match by 0–18 to 1–14 to claim their third championship title overall and a first title in 11 years.

== Team changes ==
=== To Championship ===
Promoted from the East Cork Junior B Hurling Championship

- Bride Rovers

=== From Championship ===
Relegated to the East Cork Junior B Hurling Championship

- Watergrasshill

== Group 1 ==
=== Group 1 table ===
Knockout stage Relegated

Team	Matches				Score			Pts
Team	Pld	W	D	L	For	Against	Diff	Pts
Cobh	2	2	0	0	44	38	6	4
Killeagh	2	1	0	1	42	32	10	2
Fr O'Neill's	2	0	0	2	29	45	-16	0

=== Group 1 results ===
7 August 2023 Round 1	Fr O'Neill's	0-10 - 3-14	Killeagh	Youghal Grounds

13 August 2023 Round 2	Cobh	0-22 - 1-16	Killeagh	Dungourney Grounds

1 September 2023 Round 3	Cobh	1-19 - 2-13	Fr O'Neill's	Castlemartyr Grounds

== Group 2 ==
=== Group 2 table ===
Knockout stage

Team	Matches				Score			Pts
Team	Pld	W	D	L	For	Against	Diff	Pts
Carrignavar	2	2	0	0	41	36	5	4
Carrigtwohill	2	1	0	1	32	28	4	2
Midleton	2	0	0	2	34	43	-8	0

=== Group 2 results ===
7 August 2023 Round 1	Carrigtwohill	0-18 - 2-06	Midleton	Páirc Lios gCúl

13 August 2023 Round 2	Carrignavar	0-16 - 1-11	Carrigtwohill	Felix Sarsfield Memorial Park

1 September 2023 Round 3	Carrignavar	1-22 - 3-13	Midleton	Páirc Lios gCúl

== Group 3 ==
=== Group 3 table ===
Knockout stage Relegated

Team	Matches				Score			Pts
Team	Pld	W	D	L	For	Against	Diff	Pts
St Ita's	2	1	1	0	39	35	4	3
Bride Rovers	2	1	0	1	33	33	0	2
Sarsfields	2	0	1	1	38	42	-4	1

=== Group 3 results ===
7 August 2023 Round 1	Bride Rovers	1-17 - 0-16	Sarsfields	Felix Sarsfield Memorial Park

13 August 2023 Round 2	St Ita's	0-17 - 0-13	Bride Rovers	Cloyne

1 September 2023 Round 3	St Ita's	1-19 - 1-19	Sarsfields	Páirc Uí Chonaill

== Knockout stage ==
=== Relegation playoff ===
17 September 2023 Playoff	Sarsfields	2-18 - 2-20	Midleton	Páirc Bhríde

=== Quarter-finals ===
15 September 2023 Quarter-final	St Ita's	5-12 - 2-09	Carrigtwohill	Killeagh Grounds

17 September 2023 Quarter-final	Killeagh	2-17 - 1-17	Bride Rovers	St Catherine's Park

=== Semi-finals ===
29 September 2023 Semi-final	Cobh	0-12 - 2-12	St Ita's	Killeagh Grounds
		Report

8 October 2023 Semi-final	Carrignavar	1-23 - 1-12	Killeagh	Dungourney Grounds

=== Final ===
22 October 2023 Final	Carrignavar	0-18 - 1-14	St Ita's	Páirc Bhríde
	J Forde 0-8 (0-6 f, 0-1 sl), P Sheehan, C Murphy, B Connolly 0-2 each, B Murphy, O Crowley, T Geaney, D Sweeney 0-1 each.	Report	S Harnedy 1-12 (0-8 f), D O'Brien 0-2.
