= 1928 Cork Junior Hurling Championship =

Irish hurling competition

- Dates: 4 November 1928 – 20 January 1929
- Teams: 6
- Champions: St Anne's (2nd title)
- Runners-up: Ballinacurra

Tournament statistics
- Matches played: 6
- Goals scored: 44 (7.33 per match)
- Points scored: 19 (3.17 per match)

The 1928 Cork Junior Hurling Championship was the 32nd staging of the Cork Junior Hurling Championship since its establishment by the Cork County Board in 1895. The championship ran from 4 November 1928 to 20 January 1929.

The final was played on 20 January 1929 at Riverstown Sportsfield in Glanmire, between St Anne's and Ballinacurra, in what was their first and only meeting in the final. St Anne's won the match by 3-01 to 2-00 to claim their second championship title overall and a first championship title in three years.

== Qualification ==
Division	Championship	Champions	#
Avondhu	North Cork Junior Hurling Championship	Castletownroche	
Carbery	South West Junior Hurling Championship	Kilbrittain	
Carrigdhoun	South East Junior Hurling Championship	Ballinhassig	
Imokilly	East Cork Junior Hurling Championship	Ballinacurra	
Muskerry	Mid Cork Junior Hurling Championship	Ballinora	
Seandún	Cork City Junior Hurling Championship	St Anne's	

== Results ==
=== Quarter-finals ===
4 November 1928 Quarter-final	Kilbrittain	7-01 - 5-01	Ballinora	Bandon Athletic Grounds

4 November 1928 Quarter-final	St Anne's	3-02 - 3-02	Castletownroche	Buttevant Athletic Grounds

25 November 1928 Quarter-final replay	St Anne's	5-04 - 0-01	Castletownroche	Buttevant Athletic Grounds

=== Semi-finals ===
4 November 1928 Semi-final	Ballinacurra	7-02 - 5-03	Ballinhassig	Turners Cross

16 December 1928 Semi-final	St Anne's	3-01 - 1-01	Kilbrittain	Kinsale Athletic Grounds

=== Final ===
20 January 1929 Final	St Anne's	3-01 - 2-00	Ballinacurra	Riverstown Sportsfield
