= Pat Buckley (Aghabullogue hurler) =

Irish hurler

Personal information
- Native name: Pádraig Ó Buachalla (Irish)
- Born: Aghabullogue, County Cork

Sport
- Sport: Hurling
- Position: Forward
Club
- Years: Club
- 1880s-1890s: Aghabullogue
Club titles
- Cork titles: 1
Inter-county
Years	County	Apps (scores)
1892-1894	Cork	4 (?-?)
Inter-county titles
- Munster titles: 2
- All-Irelands: 2

Pat Buckley was an Irish sportsperson. He played hurling with his local club Aghabullogue and was a member of the Cork senior inter-county team from 1890 until 1892. Buckley, together with his team-mate Dan Drew, became the first players to win two All-Ireland winners' medals on the field of play.

== Playing career ==
=== Club ===
Buckley played his hurling with his local club in Aghabullogue and enjoyed some success. He won a county senior championship title in 1890 following a 7-3 to 1-1 defeat of Aghada. It remains Aghabullogue's only county final victory.

=== Inter-county ===
Buckley first came to prominence on the inter-county scene with Cork as part of the Aghabullogue selection in 1890. That year he lined out in his first provincial decider with Kerry providing the opposition. The game was far from exciting, however, at full-time Cork were the champions by 2-0 to 0-1. It was Buckley's first Munster title. Cork's next game was an All-Ireland final meeting with Wexford. The game was a controversial one and was marred by ill-tempered behaviour. A Cork player had his toe broken by one of his Wexford counterparts. Cork captain, Dan Lane, led his men off the field in protest. At the time Cork were trailing by 2-2 to 1-6, however, the GAA's Central Council later backed Cork and Buckley collected an All-Ireland Senior Hurling Championship title.

Buckley was dropped from the Cork team again in 1891, however, he was back in 1892. That year he lined out in his second provincial decider with All-Ireland champions Kerry providing the opposition once again. An exciting game developed, however, at full-time Cork were the champions by 5-3 to 2-5. It was Buckley's second Munster title. Cork's next game was an All-Ireland final meeting with Dublin. The game was a controversial one as referee Dan Fraher changed his mind after initially awarding a goal to Cork. He eventually decided that the GAA's Central Council should decide the matter. Dublin, however, had walked off the field and, because of this, Cork were awarded the title. It was Buckley's second All-Ireland title.

== Honours ==
=== Aghabullogue ===
- Cork Senior Hurling Championship: 1
  - Winner (1): 1890

=== Cork ===
- All-Ireland Senior Hurling Championship: 2
  - Winner (2): 1890, 1892
- Munster Senior Hurling Championship: 2
  - Winner (2): 1890, 1892

== Sources ==
- Corry, Eoghan, The GAA Book of Lists (Hodder Headline Ireland, 2005).
- Cronin, Jim, A Rebel Hundred: Cork's 100 All-Ireland Titles.
- Donegan, Des, The Complete Handbook of Gaelic Games (DBA Publications Limited, 2005).
