= Cork Premier Under-21 A Hurling Championship =

Cork Under-21 A Hurling Championship
- Code: Hurling
- Founded: 1973; 53 years ago
- Region: Cork (GAA)
- Trophy: Dick Barrett Cup
- No. of teams: 6 (county championship); 29 (total)
- Title holders: Sarsfields (4th title)
- Most titles: Midleton (7 titles)
- Sponsors: Evening Echo
- Official website: Official website

Cork Premier Under-21 A Hurling Championship, known for sponsorship reasons as the Evening Echo Cork County Premier Under-21 A Hurling Championship, is an annual hurling competition organised by the Cork County Board of the Gaelic Athletic Association since 1973 for the top tier under-21 hurling teams in the county of Cork in Ireland.

In its current format, the Cork Under-21 Hurling Championship begins in November following the completion of the Divisional Under-21 Championships, which are played from the summer to the winter months. The divisional champions compete in a single-elimination tournament which culminates with the county final played at Páirc Uí Rinn in December. The prize for the winning team is the Dick Barrett Cup.

As of 2024, 29 clubs were participating in the Under-21 A Championship. The title has been won at least once by 16 different clubs. The all-time record-holders are Midleton, who have won six championship titles.

Sarsfields are the Under-21 A title holders, defeating the 2018 title-holders, defeating Midleton by 2–17 to 0–22 in the 2019 final.

== History ==
=== Beginnings ===
The All-Ireland Under-21 Hurling Championship at inter-county level was created in 1964 and had proved successful in bridging the gap between the minor and senior grades. In 1973, the Cork County Board developed their own under-21 championship. It was the fifth county championship to be created in Cork, after the senior, intermediate, junior and minor championships.

=== Team dominance ===
Due to the limited time frame that players compete in the grade, it has been difficult for individual clubs to dominate the championship. In spite of this, several clubs have had limited dominance over the years. Between 1990 and 1994 St. Finbarr's dominated the championship with much of the same team by winning four championships in five seasons. Newtownshandrum ended the century by winning three successive championships between 1998 and 2000. The first decade of the new century saw Erin's Own win three championships between 2002 and 2005. Blackrock had a sustained period of dominance by winning three championships from five successive final appearances between 2012 and 2016.

=== Formats used ===
From 1973 until 2015, the championship used a divisional format. The seven respective champions from Avondhu, Carbery, Carrigdhoun, Duhallow, Imokilly, Muskerry and Seandún contested the county championship. That county-wide championship used a single elimination format whereby once a team lost they were eliminated. In 2016, the under-21 championship underwent a major restructuring whereby the divisional system for the top tier was abolished and the strongest 22 clubs entered a new countywide championship.

== Teams ==
=== Cork Under-21 A Hurling Championship ===
Division	Championship	Qualifying teams
Avondhu	North Cork Under-21 A Hurling Championship	Champions
Carbery	Carbery Under-21 A Hurling Championship	Champions
Carrigdhoun	South East Under-21 A Hurling Championship	Champions
Imokilly	East Cork Under-21 A Hurling Championship	Champions
Muskerry	Mid Cork Under-21 A Hurling Championship	Champions
Seandún	Cork City Under-21 A Hurling Championship	Champions

=== Cork Under-21 B Hurling Championship ===
Division	Championship	Qualifying teams
Avondhu	North Cork Under-21 B Hurling Championship	Champions
Carbery	Carbery Under-21 B Hurling Championship	Champions
Carrigdhoun	South East Under-21 B Hurling Championship	Champions
Imokilly	East Cork Under-21 B Hurling Championship	Champions
Muskerry	Mid Cork Under-21 B Hurling Championship	Champions
Seandún	Cork City Under-21 B Hurling Championship	Champions

=== Cork Under-21 C Hurling Championship ===
Division	Championship	Qualifying teams
Avondhu	North Cork Under-21 C Hurling Championship	Champions
Carbery	Carbery Under-21 C Hurling Championship	Champions
Carrigdhoun	South East Under-21 C Hurling Championship	Champions
Duhallow	Duhallow Under-21 Hurling Championship	Champions
Imokilly	East Cork Under-21 C Hurling Championship	Champions
Muskerry	Mid Cork Under-21 C Hurling Championship	Champions

== Sponsorship ==
Since 2005 the Premier Under-21 Championship has been sponsored by the Evening Echo. The competition was previously sponsored by TSB Bank.

== Under-21 A Hurling Championship ==
=== 2026 teams ===
29 clubs will compete in the 2026 pCork Under-21 A Hurling Championship:

Division	No.	Clubs competing in divisional championship
Avondhu	5	Ballyhea—Milford, Charleville, Fermoy, Mallow, Shandrum
Carbery	3	Bandon, **Ibane Gaels**, Newcestown
Carrigdhoun	6	Ballinhassig, Ballymartle, Carrigaline, Courcey Rovers, Kinsale, Valley Rovers
Imokilly	6	Bride Rovers, Carrigtwohill, Erin's Own, Killeagh, Midleton, Sarsfields
Muskerry	5	Ballincollig, Ballinora, Blarney, Éire Óg, Inniscarra
Seandún	4	Blackrock, Douglas, Glen Rovers, St Finbarr's

Note: Bold indicates title-holders / county representatives.

=== Roll of honour ===
#	Club	Titles	Runners-up	Championships won	Championships runners-up
1	Midleton	7	7	1979, 1983, 1988, 1989, 2011, 2013, 2024	1978, 1980, 1987, 1990, 1991, 2018, 2019, 2025
2	Glen Rovers	5	2	1974, 1984, 1995, 2001, 2008	2000, 2004
2	Blackrock	5	2	1976, 1977, 2012, 2014, 2015	2013, 2016
2	St. Finbarr's	5	1	1985, 1990, 1991, 1992, 1994	1997
2	Newtownshandrum	6	1	1973, 1998, 1999, 2000, 2010, 2025	2006
3	Na Piarsaigh	3	3	1980, 1981, 1987	1996, 1998, 2002
3	Erin's Own	3	1	2002, 2004, 2005	1999
3	Sarsfields	3	1	1975, 2003, 2017	1974
4	Duhallow	2	5	1982, 2009	2008, 2010, 2011, 2012, 2015
4	Bishopstown	2	0	2006, 2007	
5	Milford	1	3	1978	1977, 1979, 1982
5	Newcestown	1	1	1993	1992
5	Ballincollig	1	1	1996	1995
5	Douglas	1	1	2016	2005
5	Fermoy	1	0	1986	—
5	Courcey Rovers	1	0	1997	—
5	Fr. O'Neill's	1	0	2018	—
	Bandon	0	2	—	1975, 1976
	Cloughduv	0	2	—	1983, 1989
	Carrigtwohill	0	2	—	1993, 2001
	Valley Rovers	0	2	—	1985, 2003
	Carrigaline	0	2	—	2007, 2014
	Éire Óg	0	1	—	1973
	Ballyhea	0	1	—	1981
	Tracton	0	1	—	1984
	Blarney	0	1	—	1986
	Inniscarra	0	1	—	1988
	Mallow	0	1	—	1994
	Ballinhassig	0	1	—	2009
	Killeagh/St Ita's	0	1	—	2017

=== List of finals ===
Year	Winners		Runners-up	
Year	Club	Score	Club	Score
2026	Championship in progress.			
2025	Shandrum (Newtownshandrum/Dromina)	1-20	Midleton	1-17
2024	Midleton	1-20	St Finbarr's	0-18
2020–2023	No championship			
2019	Sarsfields	2–17	Midleton	0–22
2018	Fr. O'Neill's	3–24	Midleton	4–18
2017	Sarsfields	0–20	Killeagh/St Ita's	1–09
2016	Douglas	1–18	Blackrock	1–15
2015	Blackrock	1–21	Duhallow	0–08
2014	Blackrock	5–13	Carrigaline	4–10
2013	Midleton	4–13	Blackrock	3–12
2012	Blackrock	4–16	Duhallow	2–10
2011	Midleton	1–11	Duhallow	2–08
2010	Newtownshandrum	1–19	Duhallow	1–16
2009	Duhallow	0–18	Ballinhassig	1–05
2008	Glen Rovers		Duhallow	
2007	Bishopstown	2–13	Carrigaline	0–11
2006	Bishopstown	1–09	Newtownshandrum	1–08
2005	Erin's Own	0–13	Douglas	0–10
2004	Erin's Own	2–08	Glen Rovers	0–08
2003	Sarsfields		Valley Rovers	
2002	Erin's Own	1–14	Na Piarsaigh	1–07
2001	Glen Rovers	2–09	Carrigtwohill	2–06
2000	Newtownshandrum	1–17	Glen Rovers	1–07
1999	Newtownshandrum	1–13	Erin's Own	1–07
1998	Newtownshandrum	1–12	Na Piarsaigh	0–07
1997	Courcey Rovers	3–10	St. Finbarr's	1–07
1996	Ballincollig	2–08	Na Piarsaigh	1–08
1995	Glen Rovers	2–14	Ballincollig	1–14
1994	St. Finbarr's		Mallow	
1993	Newcestown	1–08	Carrigtwohill	0–07
1992	St. Finbarr's	0–09, 1–09	Newcestown	1–06, 1–05
1991	St. Finbarr's	3-11	Midleton	1–08
1990	St. Finbarr's	1–10	Midleton	2–02
1989	Midleton	5–09	Cloughduv	2–05
1988	Midleton	4–09	Inniscarra	1–15
1987	Na Piarsaigh	2–10	Midleton	1–05
1986	Fermoy	1–10	Blarney	0–09
1985	St. Finbarr's	1–10	Valley Rovers	0–10
1984	Glen Rovers	1–14	Tracton	2–09
1983	Midleton	0–16	Cloughduv	0–06
1982	Duhallow	3–05	Milford	2–06
1981	Na Piarsaigh	2–12	Ballyhea	3–03
1980	Na Piarsaigh	5–13	Midleton	1–06
1979	Midleton	3–11	Milford	2–04
1978	Milford	3–12	Midleton	1–09
1977	Blackrock		Milford	
1976	Blackrock	4–08	Bandon	0–10
1975	Sarsfields	6–03	Bandon	1–07
1974	Glen Rovers	3–10	Sarsfields	4–06
1973	Newtownshandrum		Éire Óg	

=== Premier 2 Under-21 Hurling Championship (2018–2019) ===
Year	Winners		Runners-up	
Year	Club	Score	Club	Score
2019	St. Finbarr's	2-11	Bride Rovers	2-10
2018	Ballincollig	0-19	Courcey Rovers	0-17

=== Under-21 A Hurling Championship (2016–2019) ===
Year	Winners		Runners-up	
Year	Club	Score	Club	Score
2019	Fermoy	1-17	Newcestown	1-15
2018	Bride Rovers	1-14	Cloughduv	1-10
2017	Inniscarra	1-18	Fermoy	1-11
2016	Erin's Own	3-24	Ballincollig	1-16

== Under-21 B Hurling Championship ==
This competition is confined to clubs who compete at the B level in each of the regional divisions in County Cork. The winners are presented with the Gene Fitzgerald Cup. This cup commemorates Gene Fitzgerald, the former politician who also had administrative positions with Cork GAA County Board.

=== 2026 teams ===
42 clubs will compete in the 2026 Cork Under-21 B Hurling Championship:

Division	No.	Clubs competing in divisional championship
Avondhu	8	**Ballycastle Gaels**, Ballygiblin, Clyda Rovers, Killavullen, Kilshannig, Kilworth, LC Gaels, St Dominic’s
Carbery	6	Ahan Gaels, Clonakilty, Dohenys, Kilbree, **Kilbrittain**, St Colum’s
Carrigdhoun	2	Diarmuid Ó Murchú, Valley Rovers
Imokilly	11	Aghada, Castlemartyr, Cobh, Dungourney, Fr O’Neill’s, Lisgoold, St Catherine’s, St Colman’s, St Colmcille’s, Watergrasshill, Youghal
Muskerry	5	Ballincollig, Ballinora, Cloughduv, Donoughmore, Grenagh
Seandún	10	Bishopstown, Blackrock, Douglas, Glen Rovers, Mayfield, Na Piarsaigh, Nemo Rangers, Passage West, St Vincent’s, Whitechurch

Note: Bold indicates title-holders / county representatives.

=== Roll of honour ===
#	Club	Titles	Championships won
1	Castlelyons	1	2010
1	St. Catherine's	1	2011
1	Dungourney	1	2012
1	Ballinascarthy	1	2013
1	Killeagh/St. Ita's	1	2014
1	Watergrasshill	1	2015
1	Kilshannig	1	2017
1	Sarsfields	1	2018
1	Castlemartyr	1	2019

=== List of finals ===
Year	Winners		Runners-up	
Year	Club	Score	Club	Score
2025	Bishopstown	4-13	Aghabullogue	1-17
2024	Youghal	0-16	Ballinora	0-13
2020–2023	No championship			
2019	Castlemartyr	0–15	Killavullen	1–07
2018	Sarsfields	3–14	Kildorrery	0–20
2017	Kilshannig	2–18	Sarsfields	2–11
2016				
2015	Watergrasshill	0–14	Kilworth	1–08
2014	Killeagh/St. Ita's	6–14	Clonakilty	0–08
2013	Ballinascarthy	2–07	Watergrasshill	0–09
2012	Dungourney	2–08	Nemo Rangers	1–06
2011	St. Catherine's		Ballygarvan	
2010	Castlelyons		Ballinascarthy	

== Under-21 C Hurling Championship ==
=== 2026 teams ===
20 clubs will compete in the 2026 Cork Under-21 C Hurling Championship:

Division	No.	Clubs competing in divisional championship
Avondhu	4	Araglen, Buttevant, Doneraile, Kildorrery
Carbery	3	O’Donovan Rossa, Owen Gaels, St James’
Carrigdhoun	2	Ballygarvan, Tracton
Duhallow	5	Croke Rovers, Kanturk, Millstreet, Newmarket, St Mark’s
Imokilly	2	Midleton, Sarsfields
Muskerry	4	Donoughmore, Inniscarra, Kilmichael, Lee Gaels

Note: Bold indicates title-holders.

=== List of finals ===
Year	Winners		Runners-up	
Year	Club	Score	Club	Score
2026	Championship in progress.			
2025	Cobh	8-18	Donoughmore	2-16
2024	Castlemartyr	2-15	Ballycastle Gaels	1-15

== See also ==
- Cork Under-21 Football Championship

== Sources ==
- Cork Under-21 Hurling Final results
- Cork GAA - A History 1886-1986 Jim Cronin
