= 2025 Cork Premier Intermediate Football Championship =

Annual Gaelic football competition season

- Dates: 26 July - 2 November 2025
- Teams: 12
- Sponsor: McCarthy Insurance Group
- Champions: Aghabullogue (1st title); John Corkery (captain); Ray Keane (manager)
- Runners-up: Iveleary; Seán O'Leary (captain); Barry Oldham (manager)
- Relegated: Bandon

Tournament statistics
- Matches played: 24
- Goals scored: 64 (2.67 per match)
- Points scored: 623 (25.96 per match)
- Top scorer(s): Chris Óg Jones (7-28)

The 2025 Cork Premier Intermediate Football Championship was the 20th edition of the Cork Premier Intermediate Football Championship since its establishment by the Cork County Board in 2006. The draw for the group stage placings took place on 10 December 2024. The championship ran from 26 July to 2 November 2025.

The final was played on 2 November 2025 at SuperValu Páirc Uí Chaoimh in Cork, between Aghabullogue and Iveleary, in what was their first ever meeting in the final. Aghabullogue won the match by 2-12 to 2-11 to claim their first ever championship title.

Iveleary's Chris Óg Jones was the championship's top scorer with 7-28.

== Team changes ==
=== To Championship ===
Relegated from the Cork Senior A Football Championship

- Kiskeam

Promoted from the Cork Intermediate A Football Championship

- Glanmire

=== From Championship ===
Promoted to the Cork Senior A Football Championship

- Kilshannig

Relegated to the Cork Intermediate A Football Championship

- Ilen Rovers

== Group 1 ==
=== Group 1 table ===
Quarter-finalist

Team	Matches				Score			Pts
Team	Pld	W	D	L	For	Against	Diff	Pts
Aghabullogue	3	3	0	0	48	34	14	6
Aghada	3	1	0	2	51	55	-4	2
Bantry Blues	3	1	0	2	51	57	-6	2
Nemo Rangers	3	1	0	2	45	49	-4	2

=== Group 1 results ===
26 July 2025 Round 1	Aghabullogue	2-11 - 0-12	Bantry Blues	Páirc Traolach Mac Suibhne
	L Casey 1-4, M Bradley 0-4 (1 2pt f), E O’Sullivan 1-0, A O’Sullivan 0-2 (0-1 45), P Ring 0-1.	Report	D Sheedy 0-5, S O’Leary 0-2 (1 2pt f), S Keevers, A Coakley (f), P Cronin (f), J Sheedy, M Óg O’Sullivan 0-1 each.

26 July 2025 Round 1	Aghada	2-09 - 2-13	Nemo Rangers	Páirc Uí Chonaill
	D Byrne 1-2 (1 tp), J O'Hanlon 1-0, C Hegarty 0-3 (0-2f), P O'Neill, F Cody, R Murphy, S Maloney 0-1 each.	Report	J Coogan 1-6 (0-3 f), C Shalloe 1-0, C O'Donovan 0-4, S Burke 0-2, C Kiely 0-1.

23 August 2025 Round 2	Bantry Blues	1-17 - 6-08	Aghada	Kilmichael Grounds
	A Coakley 1-8 (2 2pt f, 0-1 f), D Sheedy (0-1 f), P Cronin 0-3 each, S Keevers 0-2, E Minihane 0-1.	Report	D Phelan 2-1, J O’Hanlon 1-3 (0-2 f), D Byrne, P O’Neill 1-1 each, K O’Shea 1-0, J Colbert, S Morrissey 0-1 each.

23 August 2025 Round 2	Nemo Rangers	0-12 - 2-09	Aghabullogue	Cloughduv Grounds
	J Coogan 0-6, C O’Donovan 0-3, C Yealland, C Shalloe, R Hogan 0-1 each.	Report	L Casey 1-3, E O’Sullivan 0-3, P O’Sullivan 1-0, M Bradley, C O’Sullivan, B O’Sullivan 0-1 each.

13 September 2025 Round 3	Aghabullogue	1-13 - 0-10	Aghada	Páirc Uí Chonchúir
	L Casey 1-4, E O’Sullivan 0-4 (0-2f), J Corkery 0-2 (2pt), M Bradley 0-2 f, A O’Sullivan 0-1.	Report	C Hegarty 0-6 (2-2pt), J Norris 0-2 (2pt), D Byrne, J Hanlon 0-1 each.

13 September 2025 Round 3	Bantry Blues	2-13 - 1-11	Nemo Rangers	Rosscarbery Grounds
	A Coakley 1-7 (0-5 f), D Sheedy 0-4 (1 tp), P Cronin 1-0, D McCarthy, J Sheedy 0-1 each.	Report	B O’Driscoll 0-4 (0-2 f), T O’Brien 1-0, L Healy 0-3 (1 tp, 0-1 f), C Shalloe 0-2 (tp), C O’Donovan (f), O Whyte 0-1 each.

== Group 2 ==
=== Group 2 table ===
Semi-finalist Quarter-finalist Relegation playoff

Team	Matches				Score			Pts
Team	Pld	W	D	L	For	Against	Diff	Pts
Naomh Abán	3	3	0	0	57	35	22	6
Glanmire	3	1	1	1	42	43	-1	3
Rockchapel	3	0	2	1	45	51	-6	2
Bandon	3	0	1	2	42	57	-15	1

=== Group 2 results ===
26 July 2025 Round 1	Bandon	0-17 - 2-15	Glanmire	Páirc Uí Chonchúir
	M Cahalane 0-11 (2 2pt, 0-4 f ), C Calnan 0-3 (1 2pt, 0-1 f), J Cahalane, D Crowley, P Murphy 0-1 each.	Report	D Molden 1-3 (1-0 pen, 0-2 f ), C McCarthy 1-2, D Lynch, B Galvin 0-3 each, D Murray 0-2, B O’Connell (f), C Crowley 0-1 each.

26 July 2025 Round 1	Naomh Abán	2-17 - 1-14	Rockchapel	Dromtarriffe Grounds
	M Ó Duinnín 0-8 (0-5 f, 2pf), E Myers (1 2pt) 0-7, D Ó Ceallaigh, W MacCarthaigh 1-0 each, D Ó Laoire 0-2.	Report	J Curtin 0-5 f, N Lenihan 1-1, S Hickey, C Curtin, J Walsh (45), J McAuliffe (0-2 each.

23 August 2025 Round 2	Rockchapel	1-12 - 1-12	Bandon	Clondrohid Grounds
	J Curtin 1-1, J O’Callaghan 0-3, S Hickey, S Curtin, E Collins (f) 0-2 each, Ciaran Curtin, J McAuliffe 0-1 each.	Report	M Sugrue (0-1 f, 0-1 45) 1-3, M Cahalane (1 2pt), C Calnan 0-3 each, P Callinan, J Cullinane, J Calnan 0-1 each.

24 August 2025 Round 2	Glanmire	0-08 - 1-10	Naomh Abán	Coachford Grounds
	D Molden 0-4 (1 2pt f, 2f), C Crowley, C McCarthy, H Jones, L Hackett 0-1 each.	Report	D Ó Ceallaigh 1-2 (1-0 pen), E Ó Mir 0-3, M Ó Duinnín 0-2 f, J Ó Donnchú, D Ó Laoire, D Ó Loinsigh 0-1 each.

13 September 2025 Round 3	Naomh Abán	1-18 - 1-07	Bandon	Páirc Cill Mhichíl
	D Ó Laoire 1-5 (2 2pt), E Ó Mír 0-7 (2 2pt), D Ó Ceallaigh 0-2, M Ó Criod, S Ó Riordáin, M Ó Duinnín (0-1 f), M Ó Liatháin 0-1 each.	Report	M Sugrue 1-1 (1-0 45, 0-1 f), D Crowley (1 2pt), J Cullinane (0-1 f) 0-3 each.

13 September 2025 Round 3	Rockchapel	1-10 - 0-13	Glanmire	Dr Croke Park
	J Curtin 1-5 (0-2 f), Ciaran Curtin 0-3, M McAuliffe, S Hickey 0-1 each.	Report	B Galvin 0-6 (1 2pt), D Molden 0-3 (0-1 f), H Jones 0-2, D Hogan, J Crowley (f) 0-1 each.

== Group 3 ==
=== Group 3 table ===
Semi-finalist Quarter-finalist Relegation playoff

Team	Matches				Score			Pts
Team	Pld	W	D	L	For	Against	Diff	Pts
Iveleary	3	3	0	0	76	42	34	6
Kiskeam	3	1	1	1	57	59	-2	3
Castletownbere	3	1	0	2	37	65	-28	2
Macroom	3	0	1	2	49	53	-4	1

=== Group 3 results ===
26 July 2025 Round 1	Castletownbere	1-12 - 0-14	Macroom	Aughaville Grounds
	J Hanley 1-1, F Fenner 0-3, J Spencer 0-2, T Murphy 0-2, J Harrington 0-2, T Collins 0-1, D Dunne 0-1.		A Quinn 0-5, P Lucey 0-3, O O'Sullivan 0-3, F Goold 0-2, E O'Leary 0-1.

27 July 2025 Round 1	Kiskeam	0-17 - 3-18	Iveleary	Castle Grounds
	S O’Sullivan 0-9 (2 2pt f, 1 2pt), T Casey 0-4 (1 2pt, 0-1 f), M Herlihy 0-3 (1 2pt), D Fitzgerald, S O’Riordan 0-1 each.	Report	C Óg Jones 2-9 (1 2pt f, 0-1 f), S Pickering 1-0, C Vaughan 0-3 (1 2pt, 0-1 f), B O’Leary 0-2 (2pt), T Roberts, S O’Riordan, S O’Leary, C O’Riordan 0-1 each.

23 August 2025 Round 2	Macroom	0-15 - 0-15	Kiskeam	Dromtarriffe Grounds
	P Lucey 0-5 (2 tpf, 0-1 45), A Quinn 0-5 (0-2 f, 1 tp), D Creedon 0-2, F Goold, S Kiely, C Dineen 0-1 each.	Report	S O’Sullivan 0-7 (2 tpf, 0-2 f), T Casey 0-3, P O’Callaghan 0-3 (1 tpf), D Fitzgerald, M Herlihy 0-1 each.

24 August 2025 Round 2	Ivealry	5-11 - 0-05	Castletownbere	St Colum's Grounds
	C Óg Jones (3-2, 0-1 free), C Vaughan (1-5, 0-2 frees, 1 2pt), I Jones (1-1), S O’Leary, C O’Leary and S Pickering (0-1 each).	Report	J Harrington (0-2), T Murphy, F Fenner (free) and O Murphy (0-1 each).

13 September 2025 Round 3	Kiskeam	4-13 - 1-14	Castletownbere	Páirc Naomh Eoin
	D Scannell (2-4), S O’Sullivan (1-3, 2f), Mike Casey (1-0), A Carroll (0-2, 1 2pt), D Fitzgerald, M Herlihy, T Casey, S O’Riordan (0-1 each).	Report	G Murphy (0-6, 2f), F Finner (1-3, 1f), A O’Sullivan (0-4, 1 2pt), T Murphy (0-1).

13 September 2025 Round 3	Iveleary	2-17 - 1-17	Macroom	Páirc Uí Chuana
	S O’Riordan 2-0, C Óg Jones 0-6 (0-2 f), T Roberts 0-3 (1 2-pt f), K Manning, B O’Leary (1 2pt), C Vaughan (1 45’) 0-2 each, D O’Riordan, I Jones 0-1 each.	Report	P Lucey 1-8 (1 2pt, 2 2-pt f), A Quinn (1 2pt), S Kiely (1 2pt) 0-3 each, E O’Leary 0-2, O O’Sullivan 0-1.

== Relegation stage ==
=== Relegation playoff ===
28 September 2025 Relegation playoff	Bandon	2-19 - 2-20	Macroom	Jack Fitzgerald Memorial Park
	M Sugrue (1-4, 0-1 free, 0-1 45), D Crowley (0-7, 3 2pts), M Cahalane (0-4, 1 2pt), T Twohig (1-0), J Mulcahy (0-2), C Calnan and P Callinan (0-1 each).	Report	P Lucey (1-12, 1-0 pen, 0-5 2pt frees, 0-1 45, 0-1 free), O O’Sullivan (1-0), E O’Leary (0-3), S Kiely and S Meaney (0-2, 1 2pt each), C Donovan (0-1).

== Knockout stage ==
=== Quarter-finals ===
27 September 2025 Quarter-final	Glanmire	0-10 - 2-12	Aghada	Páirc Lios gCúl
	C O’Neill 0-4 (2 2pt f), D Lynch (2 pt) 0-2, B Galvin (f), D Hogan, D Molden, C Crowley (0-1 each).	Report	J O’Hanlon 1-2 (0-1 f), T Hartnett 1-1, D Phelan, D Byrne (2 pt), S Morrissey, C Hegarty (0-1 45, 0-1 f) 0-2 each, J Tynan 0-1.

27 September 2025 Quarter-final	Aghabullogue	3-16 - 0-12	Kiskeam	Banteer Sportsfield
	M Bradley 0-7 (1 2pt f, 1 2pt, 0-1 45), C O'Sullivan 1-2, L Casey 1-1, P O’Sullivan 1-0, E O’Sullivan 0-3 (0-1 f), C Gillespie, P Ring, A O'Sullivan 0-1 each.	Report	S O'Sullivan 0-5 (0-3 f, 1 2ptf), T Casey 0-3 (1 2pt), A Carroll (1 2pt), M Herliny 0-2 each.

=== Semi-finals ===
11 October 2025 Semi-final	Iveleary	1-19 - 1-08	Aghada	Páirc Uí Rinn
	C Óg Jones 1-8 (0-3 f), C Vaughan 0-3, T Roberts, C O’Leary (2pt) 0-2 each, C O’Riordan, B O’Leary, I Jones, S O’Leary 0-1 each.	Report	P O’Neill 1-3, J O’Hanlon (0-1 f), J McKenna (2pt) 0-2 each, C Hegarty 0-1.

11 October 2025 Semi-final	Naomh Abán	0-15 - 2-11	Aghabullogue	Castle Grounds
	E Ó Mír 0-4 (0-2 f), M Ó Duinnín 0-3 (0-1 f, 1 2ptf), D Ó Laoire, M Ó Liatháin 0-2 each, D Ó Ceocháin D Ó Ceallaigh, A Ó Luasa and C Ó Donnchú 0-1 each.	Report	L Casey 2-0, M Bradley 0-6 (1 2ptf, 0-1 f), E O’Sullivan 0-2 (1 2ptf), A O’Sullivan, J Corkery, P Ring 0-1 each.

=== Final ===
26 October 2025 Final	Iveleary	2-11 - 2-12	Aghabullogue	SuperValu Páirc Uí Chaoimh
	C Vaughan 0-7 (2 2pt, 1 2pt f), C Óg Jones 1-3 (0-3 f), I Jones 1-0, S O’Riordan 0-1.	Report	L Casey 1-3, A Murphy 0-4 (2 2pt), J Corkery 1-0, M Bradley 0-3 (0-1 f, 0-1 45), P O’Sullivan, A O’Sullivan 0-1 each.	Referee: P O’Driscoll (Bride Rovers)

== Championship statistics ==
=== Top scorers ===
Overall

Rank	Player	Club	Tally	Total	Matches	Average
1	Chris Óg Jones	Iveleary	7-28	49	5	9.80
2	Luke Casey	Aghabullogue	7-15	36	6	6.00
3	Pa Lucey	Macroom	2-28	34	4	8.50
4	Seán O'Sullivan	Kiskeam	1-24	27	4	6.75
5	Cathal Vaughan	Iveleary	1-20	23	5	4.60
5	Matthew Bradley	Aghabullogue	0-23	23	6	3.83
7	Arthur Coakley	Bantry Blues	2-16	22	3	7.33
8	Ed Myers	Naomh Abán	0-21	21	4	5.25
9	Michael Cahalane	Bandon	0-18	18	4	4.50
10	Mark Sugrue	Bandon	3-08	17	4	4.25

Single game

Rank	Player	Club	Tally	Total	Opposition
1	Chris Óg Jones	Iveleary	2-09	15	Kiskeam
1	Pa Lucey	Macroom	1-12	15	Bandon
3	Chris Óg Jones	Iveleary	3-02	11	Castletownbere
3	Chris Óg Jones	Iveleary	1-08	11	Aghada
3	Pa Lucey	Macroom	1-08	11	Iveleary
3	Arthur Coakley	Bantry Blues	1-08	11	Aghada
3	Michael Cahalane	Bandon	0-11	11	Glanmire
8	Dave Scannell	Kiskeam	2-04	10	Castletownbere
8	Arthur Coakley	Bantry Blues	1-07	10	Nemo Rangers
10	Seán O'Sullivan	Kiskeam	0-09	9	Iveleary
