= 2004 Cork Junior A Football Championship =

- Dates: 24 October – 21 November 2004
- Teams: 8
- Sponsor: Permanent TSB
- Champions: Aghabullogue (1st title); Connie Lucey (captain)
- Runners-up: Adrigole

Tournament statistics
- Matches played: 7
- Goals scored: 13 (1.86 per match)
- Points scored: 115 (16.43 per match)
- Top scorer(s): Vincent Hurley (2–17)

The 2004 Cork Junior A Football Championship was the 106th staging of the Cork Junior A Football Championship since its establishment by Cork County Board in 1895. The championship ran from 24 October to 21 November 2004.

The final was played on 21 November 2004 at Páirc Uí Rinn in Cork, between Aghabullogue and Adrigole, in what was their first ever meeting in the final. Aghabullogue won the match by 1–09 to 1–07 to claim their first ever championship title.

== Qualification ==
Division	Championship	Representatives
Avondhu	North Cork Junior A Football Championship	Ballyclough
Beara	Beara Junior A Football Championship	Adrigole
Carbery	South West Junior A Football Championship	Tadhg Mac Carthaigh
Carrigdhoun	South East Junior A Football Championship	Ballymartle
Duhallow	Duhallow Junior A Football Championship	Cullen
Imokilly	East Cork Junior A Football Championship	Bride Rovers
Muskerry	Mid Cork Junior A Football Championship	Aghabullogue
Seandún	City Junior A Football Championship	Douglas

== Results ==
=== Quarter-finals ===
24 October 2004 Quarter-final	Adrigole	1–14 – 1–06	Ballyclough	Inchigeelagh Grounds
	BJ O'Sullivan 0-6, P O'Sullivan 1-0, F Carey 0-3, K O'Neill 0-1, T O'Shea 0-1, EJ O'Sullivan 0-1, KJ O'Sullivan 0-1, J Goggin 0-1.		C O'Neill 1-3, T O'Neill 0-1, J O'Shea 0-1, T O'Connor 0-1.

29 October 2004 Quarter-final	Bride Rovers	4–03 – 0–06	Cullen	Páirc Uí Rinn
	J O'Driscoll 2-0, T Broderick 1-1, C O'Keeffe 1-1, B Walsh 0-1.		D O'Sullivan 0-3, B O'Connor 0-3.

6 November 2004 Quarter-final	Aghabullogue	0–08 – 0–05	Tadhg Mac Carthaigh	St Mary's Park
	J Hogan 0-4, P Kelleher 0-1, D Buckley 0-1, D Kiely 0-1, B Kiely 0-1.		M McCarthy 0-4, C O'Driscoll 0-1.

7 November 2004 Quarter-final	Courcey Rovers	1–15 – 1–05	Douglas	Ballymartle Grounds
	V Hurley 0-12, S Hayes 1-0, J Murphy 0-2, T Lordan 0-1.		C Hogan 1-1, D Meade 0-2, P Tobin 0-1, P O'Sullivan 0-1.

=== Semi-finals ===
14 November 2004 Semi-final	Aghabullogue	1–13 – 0–05	Bride Rovers	Caherlag Grounds
	P Kelliher 0-5, J Kelliher 1-0, J Horgan 0-3, D Kelly 0-2, N Buckley 0-1, B Kiely 0-1, P O'Rourke 0-1.		T Broderick 0-3, B Johnson 0-2.

14 November 2004 Semi-final	Adrigole	0–14 – 2–05	Courcey Rovers	Sam Maguire Park
	BJ O'Sullivan 0-7, T O'Shea 0-4, P O'Sullivan 0-2, K O'Sullivan-Greene 0-1.		V Hurley 2-5.

=== Final ===
21 November 2004 Final	Aghabullogue	1–09 – 1–07	Adrigole	Páirc Uí Rinn
	J Hogan 1-1, D Kiely 0-4, E Twomey 0-2, B Kiely 0-1, P O'Rourke 0-1.		BJ O'Sullivan 0-6, F Carey 1-0, EJ O'Sullivan 0-1.

== Championship statistics ==
=== Top scorers ===
Rank	Player	Club	Tally	Total	Matches	Average
1	Vincent Hurley	Courcey Rovers	2-17	23	2	11.50
2	Brendan Jer O'Sullivan	Adrigole	0-19	19	3	6.33
3	John Hogan	Aghabullogue	1-08	11	3	3.33
