= East Cork Junior A Hurling Championship =

- Irish: Craobh Iomána Sóisear A Uí Mac Coille
- Code: Hurling
- Founded: 1925; 101 years ago
- Region: Imokilly (GAA)
- Trophy: Jamesy Kelleher Cup
- No. of teams: 11
- Title holders: Killeagh (7th title)
- Most titles: Castlemartyr (11 titles)
- Sponsors: East Cork Oil
- Official website: East Cork GAA

The East Cork Junior A Hurling Championship (known for sponsorship reasons as the East Cork Oil Junior A Hurling Championship) is an annual club hurling competition organised by the East Cork Board of the Gaelic Athletic Association and contested by the top-ranking junior clubs in East Cork, Ireland, deciding the competition winners through a group stage and knockout format. It is the most prestigious competition in East Cork hurling.

Introduced in 1925 as the East Cork Junior Championship, it was initially a straight knockout tournament. The competition went through a number of format changes since then, including the introduction of a back-door or second chance for beaten teams. The competition has since added a round-robin group stage.

In its current format, the East Cork Junior A Championship begins with a group stage in late summer. The eight participating teams are divided into two groups of four and play each other in a round-robin system. The two top-ranking teams in each group proceed to the knockout phase that culminates with the final. The winner of the East Cork Junior A Championship, as well as receiving the Jamesy Kelleher Cup, also qualifies for the subsequent Cork Junior A Hurling Championship.

The competition has been won by 22 teams, 18 of which have won it more than once. Castlemartyr are the most successful team in the tournament's history, having won it 11 times. Killeagh are the title holders, having beaten Bride Rovers by 1–22 to 0–12 in the 2026 final.

== Format ==
=== Group stage ===
The eight teams are divided into two groups of four. Over the course of the group stage, each team plays once against the others in the group, resulting in each team being guaranteed at least three games. Two points are awarded for a win, one for a draw and zero for a loss. The teams are ranked in the group stage table by points gained, then scoring difference and then their head-to-head record. The top two teams in each group qualify for the knockout stage.

=== Knockout stage ===
Quarter-finals: Two lone quarter-finals featuring the second and third-placed teams from both groups contest this round. Two teams qualify for the next round.

Semi-finals: The two quarter-final winners and the two highest-placed qualifying teams from the group stage contest this round. The two winners from these games advance to the final.

Final: The two semi-final winners contest the final. The winning team are declared champions.

=== Relegation ===
The two bottom-placed teams from the group stage take part in a playoff, with the losing team being relegated to the East Cork Junior B Hurling Championship for the following season.

== Teams ==
=== 2026 teams ===
The 11 teams competing in the 2026 East Cork Junior A Hurling Championship were:

Team	Location	Colours	Position in 2026	In championship since	Championship Titles	Last Championship Title
Bride Rovers	Rathcormac	Green, white and yellow	Runners-up	2023	5	1998
Carrignavar	Carrignavar	Red and green	Semi-finals	?	3	2023
Carrigtwohill	Carrigtwohill	Blue and gold	Quarter-finals	?	9	1994
Cobh	Cobh	Yellow and green	Semi-finals	?	4	2025
Dungourney	Dungourney	Green and gold	Group stage	2026	4	2015
Fr O'Neill's	Ballymacoda	Green and red	Quarter-finals	2025	5	2005
Killeagh	Killeagh	Green and white	Champions	?	7	2026
Midleton	Midleton	Black and white	Group stage	2026	10	1990
Sarsfields	Glanmire	Blue, white and black	Group stage	?	4	2016
St Ita's	Gortroe	White and green	Group stage	2008	1	2021
Watergrasshill	Watergrasshill	Red and white	Group stage	2026	3	2003

== Roll of honour ==
=== By club ===
#	Team	Titles	Runners-up	Championships won	Championships runners-up
1	Castlemartyr	11	4	1935, 1946, 1950, 1951, 1954, 1963, 1964, 2009, 2010, 2013, 2014	1962, 1967, 1975, 2011
2	Midleton	10	4	1925, 1929, 1934, 1936, 1943, 1945, 1982, 1984, 1989, 1990	1942, 1983, 1988, 1999
3	Carrigtwohill	9	5	1941, 1947, 1948, 1956, 1962, 1965, 1966, 1978, 1994	1928, 1929, 1943, 1964, 1969
3	Cloyne	9	4	1938, 1939, 1944, 1958, 1960, 1961, 1976, 1986, 1987	1945, 1959, 1974, 1978
5	Killeagh	7	6	1967, 1970, 1971, 1988, 1995, 2024, 2026	1951, 1957, 1986, 1993, 1994, 2008
6	Aghada	6	7	1931, 1933, 1940, 1980, 1991, 1992	1927, 1935, 1939, 1949, 1979, 1989, 1990
6	Erin's Own	6	5	1973, 1975, 1977, 1979, 2007, 2022	2001, 2002, 2005, 2012, 2021
8	Bride Rovers	5	7	1930, 1932, 1968, 1969, 1998	1931, 1938, 1972, 1973, 1997, 2025, 2026
8	Fr O'Neill's	5	7	1996, 1999, 2001, 2002, 2005	1961, 1963, 1987, 1991, 1992, 2000, 2004
10	Dungourney	4	8	1972, 2006, 2011, 2015	1941, 1970, 1971, 1976, 1981, 1998, 2003, 2010
10	Sarsfields	4	6	1937, 1953, 2004, 2016	1926, 1936, 1968, 2007, 2009, 2013
10	St Catherine's	4	6	1957, 1981, 1983, 2017	1955, 1956, 1960, 1977, 1980, 2016
10	Cobh	4	4	1926, 1959, 1985, 2025	1952, 1958, 2014, 2022
14	Carrignavar	3	4	2008, 2012, 2023	1966, 2019, 2020, 2024
14	Watergrasshill	3	3	1974, 2000, 2003	1982, 1985, 1995
14	Castlelyons	3	2	1955, 1993, 1997	1954, 1996
14	Ballinacurra	3	0	1927, 1928, 1942	—
18	Russell Rovers	2	2	2018, 2019	2006, 2017
19	Leeside	1	3	1949	1930, 1932, 1933
19	Youghal	1	3	1952	1953, 1965, 1984
19	St Ita's	1	3	2021	2015, 2018, 2023
19	Lisgoold	1	0	2020	—

== List of finals ==
=== List of East Cork JAHC finals ===
Year	Winners		Runners-up		#
Year	Club	Score	Club	Score	#
2026	Killeagh	1-22	Bride Rovers	0-12	
2025	Cobh	3-19	Bride Rovers	3-11	
2024	Killeagh	2–18	Carrignavar	2–16	
2023	Carrignavar	0-18	St Ita's	1-14	
2022	Erin's Own	4-12	Cobh	2-09	
2021	St Ita's	1-14	Erin's Own	1-05	
2020	Lisgoold	0-17	Carrignavar	0-11	
2019	Russell Rovers	1-16	Carrignavar	0-16	
2018	Russell Rovers	2-16	St Ita's	1-12	
2017	St Catherine’s	1-12	Russell Rovers	1-10	
2016	Sarsfields	1-25	St Catherine’s	1-12	
2015	Dungourney	1-23	St Ita's	2-12	
2014	Castlemartyr	1-16	Cobh	2-11	
2013	Castlemartyr	2-16	Sarsfields	2-10	
2012	Carrignavar	1-15	Erin's Own	1-10	
2011	Dungourney	0-18	Carrignavar	1-14	
2010	Castlemartyr	1-11	Dungourney	1-09	
2009	Castlemartyr	0-23	Sarsfields	2-11	
2008	Carrignavar	2-15	Killeagh	0-09	
2007	Erin's Own	1-10	Sarsfields	0-11	
2006	Dungourney	3-09	Russell Rovers	0-09	
2005	Fr O'Neill's	1-11	Erin's Own	2-04	
2004	Sarsfields	0-13	Fr O'Neill's	0-07	
2003	Watergrasshill	4-12	Dungourney	2-12	
2002	Fr O'Neill's	0-20	Erin's Own	3-09	
2001	Fr O'Neill's	3-13	Erin's Own	2-05	
2000	Watergrasshill	1-11	Fr O'Neill's	0-10	
1999	Fr O'Neill's	0-09	Midleton	0-04	
1998	Bride Rovers	2-13	Dungourney	2-06	
1997	Castlelyons	1-16	Bride Rovers	0-09	
1996	Fr O'Neill's	1-07	Castlelyons	0-09	
1995	Killeagh	1-09	Watergrasshill	1-08	
1994	Carrigtwohill	2-16	Killeagh	0-15	
1993	Castlelyons	2-11	Killeagh	1-09	
1992	Aghada	2-10	Fr O'Neill's	1-10	
1991	Aghada	2-12	Fr O'Neill's	1-07	
1990	Midleton	2-08	Aghada	0-09	
1989	Midleton	2-09	Aghada	1-09	
1988	Killeagh	1-05, 1-10 (R)	Midleton	0-08, 1-08 (R)	
1987	Cloyne	3-14	Fr O'Neill's	3-07	
1986	Cloyne	3-09	Killeagh	2-07	
1985	Cobh	2-06	Watergrasshill	1-07	
1984	Midleton	1-11, 3-07 (R)	Youghal	1-11, 0-05 (R)	
1983	St Catherine’s	4-14	Midleton	3-07	
1982	Midleton	4-12	Watergrasshill	1-08	
1981	St Catherine’s	3-12	Dungourney	1-07	
1980	Aghada	3-06	St Catherine’s	1-07	
1979	Erin's Own	0-15	Aghada	2-01	
1978	Carrigtwohill	2-17	Cloyne	0-09	
1977	Erin's Own	1-10	St Catherine’s	0-12	
1976	Cloyne	2-12	Dungourney	2-05	
1975	Erin's Own	4-07	Castlemartyr	3-06	
1974	Watergrasshill		Cloyne		
1973	Erin's Own		Bride Rovers		
1972	Dungourney		Killeagh		
1971	Killeagh		Dungourney		
1970	Killeagh		Dungourney		
1969	Bride Rovers		Carrigtwohill		
1968	Bride Rovers		Sarsfields		
1967	Killeagh		Castlemartyr		
1966	Carrigtwohill		Carrignavar		
1965	Carrigtwohill		Youghal		
1964	Castlemartyr		Carrigtwohill		
1963	Castlemartyr		Fr O'Neill's		
1962	Carrigtwohill		Castlemartyr		
1961	Cloyne		Fr O'Neill's		
1960	Cloyne		St Catherine’s		
1959	Cobh		Cloyne		
1958	Cloyne		Cobh		
1957	St Catherine’s		Killeagh		
1956	Carrigtwohill		St Catherine’s		
1955	Castlelyons		St Catherine’s		
1954	Castlemartyr		Castlelyons		
1953	Sarsfields		Youghal		
1952	Youghal		Cobh		
1951	Castlemartyr		Killeagh		
1950	Castlemartyr		O'Brien's		
1949	Leeside		Aghada		
1948	Carrigtwohill		O'Brien's		
1947	Carrigtwohill		O'Brien's		
1946	Castlemartyr		O'Brien's		
1945	Midleton		Cloyne		
1944	Cloyne		O'Brien's		
1943	Midleton		Carrigtwohill		
1942	Ballinacurra		Midleton		
1941	Carrigtwohill		Dungourney		
1940	Aghada		Ballymacoda		
1939	Cloyne		Aghada		
1938	Cloyne		Bride Rovers		
1937	Sarsfields		Ballymacoda		
1936	Midleton		Sarsfields		
1935	Castlemartyr		Aghada		
1934	Midleton		Sarsfields		
1933	Aghada		Leeside		
1932	Bride Rovers		Leeside		
1931	Aghada		Bride Rovers		
1930	Bride Rovers		Leeside		
1929	Midleton		Carrigtwohill		
1928	Ballinacurra		Carrigtwohill		
1927	Ballinacurra		Aghada		
1926	Cobh		Sarsfields		

=== Notes ===
- 2003 - The first match ended in a draw: Dungourney 2-06, Watergrasshill 1-09.
- 2011 - The first match ended in a draw: Dungourney 0-11, Carrignavar 1-08.
- 2024 - The first match ended in a draw: Killeagh 0-13, Carrignavar 1-10.

== See also ==
- East Cork Junior A Football Championship
