= 1991 Cork Intermediate Football Championship =

Gaelic football competition

- Dates: 28 April - 8 September 1991
- Teams: 19
- Champions: Aghada (2nd title); Denis Healy (captain)
- Runners-up: Ballincollig; Kenneth O'Mahony (captain)

Tournament statistics
- Matches played: 22
- Goals scored: 39 (1.77 per match)
- Points scored: 375 (17.05 per match)
- Top scorer(s): Antony Barry (0-24)

The 1991 Cork Intermediate Football Championship was the 56th staging of the Cork Intermediate Football Championship since its establishment by the Cork County Board in 1909. The draw for the opening round fixtures took place on 16 December 1990.

The final was played on 8 September 1991 at Páirc Uí Chaoimh in Cork, between Aghada and Ballincollig, in what was their first ever final meeting. Aghada won the match by 0-09 to 0-08 to claim their first ever championship title.

== Results ==
=== First round ===
28 April 1991 First round	Millstreet	1-08 - 0-08	Valley Rovers	Castle Grounds
	T O'Connor 1-1, A Barry 0-3, S Barrett 0-2, E O'Sullivan 0-2.		E McCarthy 0-6, F Crowley 0-1, TJ Deasy 0-1.

19 May 1991 First round	Douglas	2-07 - 3-10	Bantry Blues	St. Mary's Park
	D Wilson 1-2, E Forde 1-1, D Larkin 0-2, K Golden 0-1, D O'Callaghan 0-1.		K Harrington 2-3, L O'Brien 1-6, F Delaney 0-1.

26 May 1991 First round	St. Finbarr's	0-09 - 1-11	Kilmurry	Ovens Grounds
	J Keating 0-6, B O'Shea 0-2, E Haines 0-1.		M Kelleher 0-5, TJ O'Leary 1-0, J O'Leary 0-2, D Moss 0-2, S Murphy 0-1, D O'Sullivan 0-1.

=== Second round ===
4 May 1991 Second round	Delaney Rovers	0-06 - 0-10	Aghada	Caherlag Grounds
	P Crowley 0-4, G Healy 0-1, N Moloney 0-1.		R Lewis 0-3, D Devoy 0-2, P Cashman 0-1, B Tynan 0-1, M Lewis 0-1, S O'Keeffe 0-1, D Creedon 0-1.

5 May 1991 Second round	Castletownbere	2-09 - 1-10	Mallow	Inchigeelagh Grounds
	J Power 1-2, S Spencer 0-5, O O'Sullivan 1-0, C Collins 0-1, N Harrington 0-1.		R Sheehan 1-4, J Walsh 0-2, M Fallon 0-1, K Mills 0-1, Jer Buckley 0-1, J O'Mahony 0-1.

5 May 1991 Second round	Clyda Rovers	2-13 - 0-09	Newcestown	Páirc Eoin Mhic Chárthaigh
	T McGlinchey 1-2, C O'Sullivan 0-4, D Corbett 1-0, A Looney 0-3, M O'Hanlon 0-2, R Walsh 0-1, B Kelleher 0-1.		D Long 0-4, P Kenneally 0-1, S O'Donovan 0-1, S Lordan 0-1, M O'Mahony 0-1, T Crowley 0-1.

5 May 1991 Second round	Bandon	2-07 - 1-09	St. Vincent's	Cloughduv Grounds
	L Waugh 1-3, M O'Riordan 1-0, M Lyons 0-2, N Crowley 0-1, F Lyons 0-1.		A Elliot 1-6, G Cooney 0-2, D Grandon 0-1.

25 May 1991 Second round	Naomh Abán	0-08 - 1-10	Nemo Rangers	Páirc Naomh Eoin
	D Lynch 0-3, D O'Riordan 0-2, S Hyde 0-1, D Cronin 0-1, K Lynch 0-1.		T Griffin 1-1, E O'Mahony 0-3, J Coogan 0-1, A Quinlivan 0-1, S Hayes 0-1, M Dorgan 0-1, J Cotter 0-1.

26 May 1991 Second round	Rockchapel	1-06 - 1-10	Ballincollig	Páirc Eoin Mhic Chárthaigh
	J Casey 1-2, J Murphy 0-1, T Carroll 0-1, D O'Mahony 0-1, J Collins 0-1.		F Keohane 1-1, P O'Mahony 0-2, M O'Mahony 0-2, P Power 0-2, J Kelleher 0-1, C O'Connell 0-1, D O'Driscoll 0-1.

1 June 1991 Second round	Bantry Blues	1-07 - 1-07	Fermoy	Ballinhassig
	S McCarthy 1-1, L O'Brien 0-3, S Dineen 0-2, P Goggin 0-1.		M Dolan 1-2, D Pyne 0-3, I O'Callaghan 0-1, F Groarke 0-1.

8 June 1991 Second round replay	Bantry Blues	1-10 - 1-06	Fermoy	Ballinhassig Grounds
	L O'Brien 0-6, K Harrington 1-2, D Goggin 0-1, B Spillane 0-1.		I O'Callaghan 1-2, D Pyne 0-3, M Dolan 0-1.

14 June 1991 Second round	Millstreet	0-11 - 1-08	Kilmurry	Castle Grounds
	A Barry 0-4, N Kelleher 0-1, C O'Connor 0-1, S Barrett 0-1, W O'Leary 0-1, B McSweeney 0-1, T Kelleher 0-1, E O'Sullivan 0-1.		D O'Sullivan 1-1, TJ O'Leary 0-3, D Moss 0-3, S Murphy 0-1.

30 June 1991 Second round replay	Millstreet	2-10 - 1-11	Kilmurry	Castle Grounds
	S Barrett 1-0, T O'Connor 1-0, B McSweeney 0-3, A Barry 0-3, E O'Sullivan 0-2, L Dennehy 0-1, T Kelleher 0-1.		D O'Sullivan 1-1, S Murphy 0-4, M Kelleher 0-3, TJ O'Leary 0-2, J Clifford 0-1.

=== Quarter-finals ===
22 June 1991 Quarter-final	Clyda Rovers	3-05 - 2-08	Castletownbere	Páirc Tadhg na Samhna
	A Looney 1-1, R Walsh 1-1, D Corbett 1-0, M O'Shea 0-2, C O'Sullivan 0-1.		S Spencer 1-1, M O'Sullivan 0-4, S Harrington 1-0, C Collins 0-2, F O'Sullivan 0-1.

6 July 1991 Quarter-final	Aghada	0-07 - 1-01	Bandon	Church Road
	M Lewis 0-2, M Hennessy 0-1, P Cashman 0-1, D Creedon 0-1, A Berry 0-1, S O'Keeffe 0-1.		M O'Riordan 1-0, L Waugh 0-1.

6 July 1991 Quarter-final	Clyda Rovers	2-10 - 0-16 (aet)	Castletownbere	Páirc Tadhg na Samhna
	M O'Shea 1-3, B Kelleher 1-1, R Walsh 0-3, J O'Sullivan 0-2, T McGlinchey 0-1.		M O'Sullivan 0-8, J Power 0-3, S Spencer 0-2, Brendan O'Driscoll 0-1, C Collins 0-1, N Harrington 0-1.

12 July 1991 Quarter-final	Ballincollig	0-09 - 1-04	Nemo Rangers	Bishopstown Grounds
	P O'Mahony 0-6, F Keohane 0-2, D Hegarty 0-1.		M Dorgan 1-0, E O'Mahony 0-2, A Quinlivan 0-1, P Lambert 0-1.

14 July 1991 Quarter-final	Millstreet	1-11 - 0-10	Bantry Blues	Ballingary Grounds
	A Barry 0-10, E O'Sullivan 1-1.		L O'Brien 0-4, B Spillane 0-2, J Cotter 0-2, K Harrington 0-2.

14 July 1991 Quarter-final second replay	Clyda Rovers	2-07 - 0-10	Castletownbere	Páirc Tadhg na Samhna
	B Kelleher 2-0, A Lowney 0-5, C O'Sullivan 0-1, R Walsh 0-1.		M O'Sullivan 0-6, N Harrington 0-1, J Power 0-1, C Collins 0-1, G O'Sullivan 0-1.

=== Semi-finals ===
4 August 1991 Semi-final	Aghada	0-11 - 0-06	Millstreet	Ovens Grounds
	M Lewis 0-4, B Aherne 0-2, D Creedon 0-1, K O'Keeffe 0-1, L Berry 0-1, P Cashman 0-1, R Lewis 0-1.		A Barry 0-4, T O'Connor 0-1, C O'Connor 0-1.

18 August 1991 Semi-final	Ballincollig	0-11 - 1-02	Clyda Rovers	Páic Liam Mhic Chárthaigh
	P O'Mahony 0-5, M O'Mahony 0-2, J Kelleher 0-1, P O'Hare 0-1, F Keohane 0-1, G Ring 0-1.		R Walsh 1-0, B Kelleher 0-1, A Looney 0-1.	Referee: N Barrett (Carrigtwohill)

=== Final ===
8 September 1991 Final	Aghada	0-09 - 0-08	Ballincollig	Páirc Uí Chaoimh
	M Lewis 0-4, D Creedon 0-3, K O'Keeffe 0-1, A Berry 0-1.		P O'Mahony 0-4, D Lucey 0-3, F Keohane 0-1.	Referee: G Harrington (Carrigaline)

== Championship statistics ==
=== Top scorers ===
Overall

Rank	Player	Club	Tally	Total	Matches	Average
1	Anthony Barry	Millstreet	0-24	24	5	4.80
2	Liam O'Brien	Bantry Blues	1-19	22	4	5.50
3	Martin O'Sullivan	Castletownbere	0-18	18	4	4.50
4	Podsie O'Mahony	Ballincollig	0-17	17	4	4.25
5	Kevin Harrington	Bantry Blues	3-07	16	3	5.33
6	Brendan Kelleher	Clyda Rovers	3-03	12	5	2.40
6	Robert Walsh	Clyda Rovers	2-06	12	5	2.40
8	Séamus Spencer	Castletownbere	1-08	11	4	2.75
8	Mick Lewis	Aghada	0-11	11	4	2.75
10	Donal O'Sullivan	Kilmurry	2-03	9	3	3.00
10	Anthony Elliott	St. Vincent's	1-06	9	1	9.00

In a single game

Rank	Player	Club	Tally	Total	Opposition
1	Anthony Barry	Millstreet	0-10	10	Bantry Blues
2	Kevin Harrington	Bantry Blues	2-03	9	Douglas
2	Liam O'Brien	Bantry Blues	1-06	9	Douglas
2	Anthony Elliott	St. Vincent's	1-06	9	Bandon
5	Martin O'Sullivan	Castletownbere	0-08	8	Clyda Rovers
6	Ronan Sheehan	Mallow	1-04	7	Castletownbere
7	Brendan Kelleher	Clyda Rovers	2-00	6	Castletownbere
7	Mick O'Shea	Clyda Rovers	1-03	6	Castletownbere
7	Leonard Waugh	Bandon	1-03	6	St. Vincent's
7	Éamonn McCarthy	Valley Rovers	0-06	6	Millstreet
7	Jim Keating	St. Finabrr's	0-06	6	Kilmurry
7	Liam O'Brien	Bantry Blues	0-06	6	Fermoy
7	Podsie O'Mahony	BAllincollig	0-06	6	Nemo Rangers
7	Martin O'Sullivan	Castletownbere	0-06	6	Clyda Rovers
