= 1989 Cork Junior A Football Championship =

- Teams: 8
- Champions: Aghada (1st title); Alan Devoy (captain)
- Runners-up: Knocknagree

The 1989 Cork Junior A Football Championship was the 91st staging of the Cork Junior A Football Championship since its establishment by Cork County Board in 1895.

The final was played on 19 November 1989 at the Ballyanley Grounds in Inniscarra, between Aghada and Knocknagree, in what was their first ever meeting in the final. After a draw and a replay, Aghada won the match by 0–08 to 0–04 to claim their first ever championship title.

== Results ==
=== Final ===
12 November 1989 Final	Aghada	0–09 – 0–09	Knocknagree	Ballyanley Grounds

19 November 1989 Final replay	Aghada	0–08 – 0–04	Knocknagree	Ballyanley Grounds
