= Dan Lane =

Irish hurler

Personal information
- Native name: Dónall Ó Laighin (Irish)
- Born: c.1861 Coachford, County Cork, Ireland
- Died: 3 June 1940 (aged 79) Cork, Ireland
- Occupations: Labourer and farmer

Sport
- Sport: Hurling
- Position: Forward
Club
- Years: Club
- Aghabullogue
Club titles
- Cork titles: 1
Inter-county*
Years	County	Apps (scores)
1890	Cork	2
Inter-county titles
- Munster titles: 1
- All-Irelands: 1
- *Inter County team apps and scores correct as of 15:27, 1 July 2014.

Daniel Lane (c.1861 - 3 June 1940) was an Irish hurler. At club level he played with Aghabullogue and at inter-county level with the Cork senior hurling team. Lane captained Cork to their inaugural All-Ireland SHC title in 1890.

== Career ==
Born and raised in the townland of Tullig near Coachford, County Cork, Lane first played hurling with the nearby Aghabullogue club. He captained the club to what remains their only Cork SHC title, following a 7–03 to 1–01 win over Aghada in 1890.

Aghabullogue were the Cork representatives at inter-county level as a result of this win. Lane subsequently guided Cork to their second ever Munster SHC title, after beating Kerry by 2–00 to 0–01 in the final. This win qualified Cork for the 1890 All-Ireland SHC final against Wexford. The game was marred by ill-tempered behaviour and ‘alleged excessively rough play’, with one of the Cork players having his toe broken by one of the Wexford players. Lane withdrew his players from the game, with the referee's permission. Wexford had been leading by 2–02 to 1–06 at the time, however, the game was recorded as 'unfinished' and Cork were subsequently awarded the title.

== Death ==
Lane died at the Mercy Hospital in Cork on 3 June 1940.

== Honours ==
Aghabullogue

- Cork Senior Hurling Championship (1): 1890 (c)

Cork

- All-Ireland Senior Hurling Championship (1): 1890 (c)
- Munster Senior Hurling Championship (1): 1890 (c)

Sporting positions
Preceded by William Ryan	Cork senior hurling team captain 1890	Succeeded by Denis Scannell
Achievements
Preceded by Nicholas O'Shea	All-Ireland SHC final winning captain 1890	Succeeded by John Mahony
