= 1925 Cork Junior Hurling Championship =

Irish hurling competition

- Champions: St. Anne's (1st title)
- Runners-up: Midleton

The 1925 Cork Junior Hurling Championship was the 29th staging of the Cork Junior Hurling Championship since its establishment by the Cork County Board.

St. Anne's won the championship following a 2–03 to 1–03 defeat of Midleton in the final. It was their first championship title in the grade.
