= St Ita's GAA =

GAA club in Cork, Ireland

St Ita's
- Founded: 1901
- County: Cork
- Nickname: Itas
- Colours: Green and White
- Grounds: Gortroe
- Coordinates: 51°54′34″N 7°53′59″W

Playing kits
Standard colours

St Ita's is a Gaelic football and hurling club based in the village of Gortroe, (near Youghal), County Cork, Ireland. It competes in competitions organised by Cork county board and the Imokilly divisional board. In 2013, Seamus Harnedy became the first player from the club to play with the Cork senior hurling team.

== History ==
History records show that in 1901 St Ita's played under the name of Gortroe in the East Cork Hurling division their opponents were Blackrock. The records do not give scores but it is shown that Blackrock advanced to the next stage of the competition. The following year 1902 its recorded that Gortroe played against Evergreen in the firsts and against United Nationals in the seconds. The records do not give scores but Gortroe lost out to Evergreen who then advanced to the semi-finals against Dungourney. For the records Dungourney were eventual winners.

The club was reformed in 1971. The club performed at Junior B in hurling until 1980 when the club won the East Cork Junior B Hurling Championship. The club performed at Junior A level for a number of years, but was eventually regraded back to Junior B. In 2007, St Ita's made history as they won the Cork Junior B Hurling Championship for the first time. They went on to compete in the Munster Junior B Club Hurling Championship, losing by 2 point to Ballingarry from County Tipperary.

== Honours ==
- Cork Under-21 Hurling Championship (0): (runners-ip in 2017 - with Killeagh)
- Cork Under-21 B Hurling Championship (1): 2014 (with Killeagh)
- Cork Premier Minor Hurling Championship (0): (runners-up in 2014 and 2016 - both with Killeagh)
- Cork Minor A Hurling Championship (1): 2006 (with Killeagh)
- East Cork Junior A Hurling Championship (1): 2021
- Munster Junior B Club Hurling Championship (0): (runners-up 2007)
- Cork Junior B Hurling Championship (1): 2007
- East Cork Junior B Hurling Final County Championship (1): 2005
- East Cork Junior B Hurling Div 2 League (1): 2005
- East Cork Junior B Hurling Championship (2): 1951, 1980

== Notable players ==
- Séamus Harnedy, Cork senior hurling captain. Winner of several All-Stars.
