= 1910 Cork Intermediate Hurling Championship =

Irish hurling competition

- Champions: Aghabullogue (1st title)
- Runners-up: Shamrocks

The 1910 Cork Intermediate Hurling Championship was the second staging of the Cork Intermediate Hurling Championship since its establishment by the Cork County Board.

Aghabullogue won the championship following a 3–2 to 2–0 defeat of Shamrocks in the final.

== Results ==
Final

Final	Aghabullogue	3-02 - 2-00	Shamrocks
