= Dungourney =

Village in County Cork, Ireland

Dungourney Dún Guairne
- Village
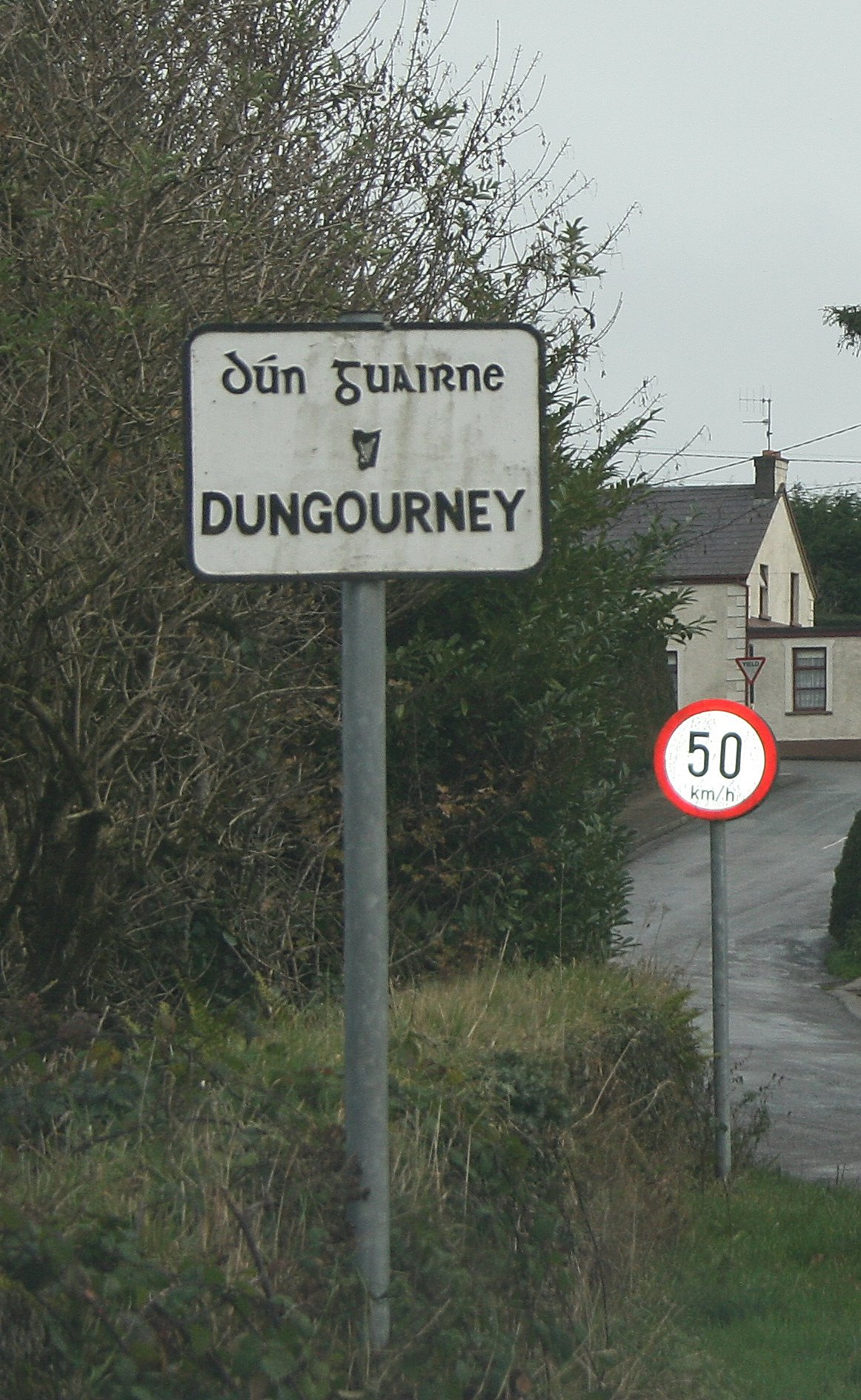
- Dungourney from the west

- Location in Ireland
- Coordinates: 51°58′10″N 8°05′25″W
- Country: Ireland
- Province: Munster
- County: Cork
- Dáil Éireann: Cork East
- EU Parliament: South
- Time zone: UTC+0 (WET)
  - Summer (DST): UTC-1 (IST (WEST))
- Irish Grid Reference: W930795

Dungourney (Irish: Dún Guairne, meaning 'Guairne's fort') is a village in County Cork, Ireland on the R627 regional road 9 km (5.6 mi) northeast of Midleton. The river Dungourney flows through the village. St. Peter's National School is located in the centre. There is a church in the west of the village and a post office across the road. There are several roads linking to Midleton, Castlemartyr and Tallow. The village is in a townland and civil parish of the same name.

== Sport ==
Dungourney GAA Club and Dungourney Camogie Club are the local Gaelic games clubs.

The Fitzgibbon Cup, the hurling competition contested by university teams, is named after Dungourney man Fr. Edwin Fitzgibbon. He was born in 1884, and went to school in the area before joining the Capuchin Franciscan Order in 1893. He died in 1938 and was buried at the Capuchin cemetery in Rochestown.

== See also ==
- List of towns and villages in Ireland
