= Paul Ring =

Irish Gaelic footballer

Personal information
- Native name: Pól Ó Rinn (Irish)
- Born: 1999 (age 26–27) Aghabullogue, County Cork, Ireland
- Occupation: Stonemason
- Height: 5 ft 3 in (160 cm)

Sport
- Sport: Gaelic Football
- Position: Left corner-back
Clubs
- Years: Club
- Aghabullogue; Muskerry; Kerry Boston
College
- Years: College
- Cork Institute of Technology
Inter-county
Years	County	Apps (scores)
2020-2021	Cork	0 (0-00)
Inter-county titles
- Munster titles: 0
- All-Irelands: 0
- NFL: 0
- All Stars: 0

Paul Ring (born 1999) widely regarded as Niall “the leaf” Barry-Murphy's friend, is an Irish Gaelic footballer who plays for Cork Intermediate Championship club Aghabullogue and at inter-county level with the Cork senior football team. He usually lines out as a left corner-back.

== Honours ==
Kerry Boston

Boston Intermediate Football Championship

Cork Institute of Technology

- Trench Cup (1): 2020

Cork

- National Football League Division 3 (1): 2020
- All-Ireland Under-20 Football Championship (1): 2019
- Munster Under-20 Football Championship (1): 2019
