= Ballinacurra GAA =

Gaelic games club in County Cork, Ireland

Ballinacurra
- Baile na Corra
- Founded: 1925
- County: Cork
- Colours: Green and white

Playing kits
Standard colours

Ballinacurra GAA (Irish: Cumann Lúthchleas Gael Baile na Corann) is a Gaelic Athletic Association club based in Ballinacurra, County Cork, Ireland. Founded in 1925, the club competes in Gaelic football and hurling competitions organised by the East Cork Divisional Board of Cork GAA. The club’s traditional colours are green and white.

== History ==
=== Foundation and early years ===
Ballinacurra GAA was founded in 1925 when Ballinacurra was a small port village with a population of approximately 400–500 people, yet one of the largest ports in Ireland at the time. With limited recreational facilities available, the formation of a GAA club provided an important sporting and social outlet for the local community.

The club’s founders included Maurice Walsh, John L. Sullivan, Michael Ring, and Billy “Bokham” Donovan. From its foundation, the club adopted green and white as its colours.

Initially, the club had no permanent playing field. A field was provided by Mr Roland, allowing training and matches to take place. Many early players trained after long working days at the local granary or port.

=== Early success (1920s–1950s) ===
Ballinacurra was founded primarily as a hurling club and enjoyed immediate success, winning the East Cork Junior A Hurling Championship in 1927 and 1928. The 1927 team went on to represent East Cork in the Inter-Divisional Junior A County Championship, reaching the final before losing to St Anne’s.

After a period of competitive performances in local tournaments, Ballinacurra secured a third East Cork Junior A title in 1942, defeating neighbouring Midleton in the final played in Cloyne. In 1955, the club won the East Cork Junior B Hurling Championship for the first time.

=== League success and consolidation (1960s–1970s) ===
From the late 1950s to the mid-1960s, Ballinacurra were a regular contender in the East Cork Junior A Hurling Championship, narrowly losing several finals and semi-finals to clubs such as Carrigtwohill, Castlemartyr, and Cloyne.

The club won the East Cork Junior A Hurling League in 1962 and retained the title in 1963, narrowly missing a third consecutive title in 1964 after losing a replay to Whitecross. Further success followed with victory in the Junior B Hurling Championship in 1970.

=== Development of Gaelic football ===
While hurling dominated the club’s early decades, Gaelic football developed later. Ballinacurra formally affiliated for football in 1980 and achieved its first football championship success in 1991, winning the East Cork Junior Football Championship with victory over Carrigtwohill.

The club later won the James Colbert Memorial Cup—the East Cork Junior B Football County Qualifier—in 1997 and 1999. The cup is named in honour of James Colbert, a native of Ballinacurra.

=== Club grounds and facilities ===
For much of its history, Ballinacurra GAA relied on the goodwill of local farmers for access to training fields. The principal of St Colman’s College, Midleton, also permitted the use of the college’s “Tech Field” for league and tournament matches.

In 1992, the club purchased 7.5 acres on the Gereagh Road from Noel McCarthy and J.H. Bennett Ltd, developing a full-size pitch approximately 0.5 km from the village. The field was first used for league matches in 1995, and hosted its first championship match in 1997.

Further development included dressing rooms, meeting facilities, referee’s room, storage areas, and spectator amenities. Additional land was later acquired to facilitate the development of training pitches.

=== Under-age development and renewed success ===
Following the opening of the club grounds, Ballinacurra established a structured under-age programme, fielding teams from U10 to under-21 level. Successes included:

- U12 East Cork Football Championship (1999)
- U14 East Cork Championship (2001), later reaching the county final

At adult level, Ballinacurra won the East Cork Junior B Hurling Championship in 1998 and 1999, earning promotion to the Junior A Championship for the 2002 season.

=== Modern era ===
Ballinacurra achieved significant county success in football, winning the Cork County Junior B Football Championship in 2018 and the Cork County Junior C Football Championship in 2024. The club also won the East Cork Division 3 Football League in 2025.

Hurling, which had been disbanded in 2017 due to player shortages, returned to the club in 2026, marking a revival of one of Ballinacurra’s traditional codes.

== Centenary year (2025) ==
The year 2025 marked the centenary of Ballinacurra GAA. Celebrations included sporting, cultural, and community events recognising 100 years of club activity.

Jarlath Burns, President of the Gaelic Athletic Association, visited Páirc na nGael, Baile na Corann, where he unveiled a commemorative plaque. A centenary cycle also took place, with club members and locals cycling across County Cork, visiting every GAA ground in the county.

As part of the centenary celebrations, Ballinacurra GAA hosted the 2025 East Cork Junior A Football Championship final.

== Honours ==
- East Cork Junior A Hurling Championship (3): 1927, 1928, 1942
- East Cork Junior B Hurling Championship (2): 1955, 1970
- Cork County Junior B Hurling Championship (1) : 2009
- Cork County Football B Championship (1) : 2018
- Cork County Junior C Championship (1) 2024
