= St. Finbarr's Hospital =

- Health Service Executive
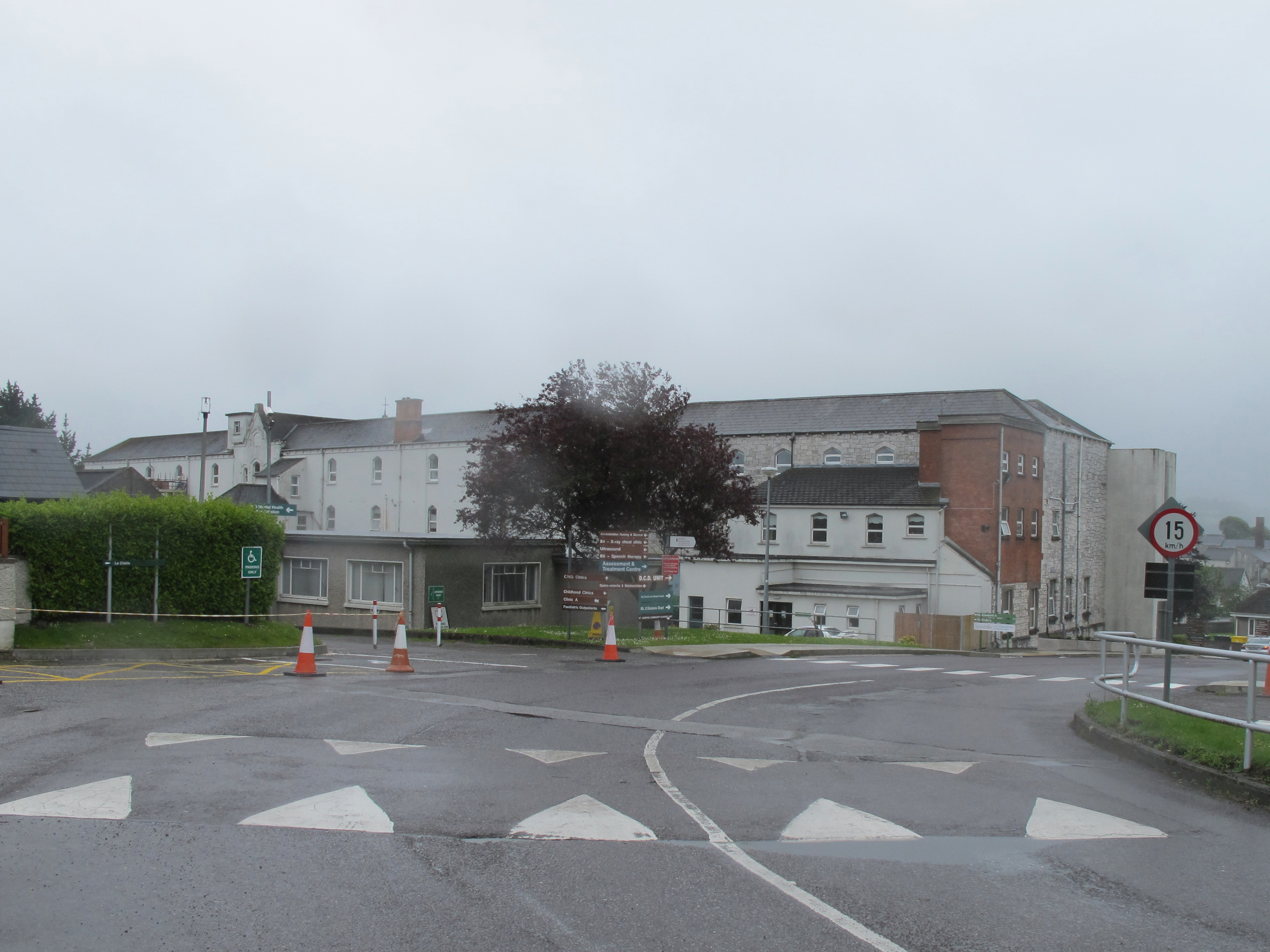
- St. Finbarrs Hospital

- Shown in Ireland

Geography
- Location: Cork, County Cork, Ireland
- Coordinates: 51.887°N 8.461°W

Organisation
- Care system: HSE
- Type: Specialist

Services
- Emergency department: No
- Speciality: Care for the elderly

History
- Founded: 1841

St. Finbarr's Hospital (Irish: Ospidéal Naomh Fionnbarra) is a care home for elderly people on the Douglas Road, Cork City, Ireland.

== History ==
The hospital has its origins in the Cork Union Workhouse and Infirmary which was designed by George Wilkinson and completed in 1841. A large three-storey block was added to the north of the site. The facility became the Cork District Hospital in 1898 and later became the Cork County Home and Hospital. It was designated by ministerial order as responsible for the treatment of medical, surgical and maternity cases, and cases of infectious and contagious diseases in 1923.
