= Dungourney GAA =

Athletic club in Dungourney, Cork County, Ireland

Dungourney
- Dún Guairne
- Founded: 1884
- County: Cork
- Colours
- Grounds: Jamesy Kelleher Memorial Park

Playing kits
Standard colours

Senior Club Championships
	All Ireland	Munster champions	Cork champions
Hurling:	0	0	3

Dungourney GAA Club is a Gaelic Athletic Association club in Dungourney, County Cork, Ireland. The club is affiliated to the East Cork Board and fields teams in both hurling and Gaelic football.

== History ==
Located in the village of Dungourney, about 9 km from Midleton, Dungourney GAA Club was established in the early years of the Gaelic Athletic Association. The club had its most successful period in the first decade of the 20th century when it won Cork SHC titles in 1902, 1907 and 1909. The first of these victories also saw Dungourney represent Cork in the inter-county series of games and win the 1902 All-Ireland SHC title after beating London in the final.

Dungourney subsequently slipped down the ranks before winning an East Cork JBHC title in 1967. This was followed by the first of four East Cork JAHC titles between 1972 and 2015. The last of these victories was later converted into a Cork JAHC title before beating Fenor by 1–17 to 0–08 to claim the Munster Club JHC title. Dungourney had their most recent success when the club won the Cork IAHC title in 2022.

== Honour ==
- All-Ireland Senior Hurling Championship (1): 1902
- Munster Senior Hurling Championship (1): 1902
- Munster Junior Club Hurling Championship (1): 2015
- Cork Senior Hurling Championship (3): 1902, 1907, 1909
- Cork Intermediate A Hurling Championship (1): 2022
- Cork Junior A Hurling Championship (1) 2015
- Cork Junior B Inter-Divisional Hurling Championship (1) 2025
- Cork Under-21 B Hurling Championship (1): 2012
- East Cork Junior A Hurling Championship (4): 1972, 2006, 2011, 2015
- East Cork Junior B Hurling Championship (1): 1967
- East Cork Under-21 B Hurling Championship (3): 1999, 2001, 2012

== Notable player ==
- Jamesy Kelleher: All-Ireland SHC-winning captain (1902)
