= Imokilly GAA =

Gaelic games club in Ireland

Imokilly
- Uí Mac Coille
- Founded: 1924
- County: Cork
- Colours

Playing kits
Standard colours

Senior Club Championships
	All Ireland	Munster champions	Cork champions
Football:	0	0	5
Hurling:	0	0	2
Ladies' football:	0	0	1
Camogie:	0	0	6

Imokilly GAA is a Gaelic football and Hurling division in east County Cork, Ireland. The division includes towns such as Midleton, Cobh, and Youghal. It is one of eight divisions of Cork County Board. It organizes competitions for the clubs within the division, from Under 12 up to the adult level. The winners of these competitions compete against other divisional champions to determine which club is the county champion. In addition, the division selects football and hurling teams from the adult teams playing at junior level or county intermediate level, and these then compete for the Cork Senior Football Championship and Cork Senior Hurling Championship. The division is known best for its hurlers, and in recent times, players from here have dominated on the Cork GAA senior hurling team.

== Clubs ==
- Aghada
- Ballinacurra
- Bride Rovers
- Carrignavar
- Carrigtwohill
- Castlelyons
- Castlemartyr
- Cobh
- Cloyne
- Dungourney
- Erin's Own
- Fr. O'Neills
- Glenbower Rovers
- Glenville
- Killeagh
- Lisgoold
- Midleton
- Russell Rovers
- Sarsfields
- St Catherine's
- St Ita's
- Watergrasshill
- Youghal

== Hurling ==
=== 2027 Championship Grades ===
Championship	Club
Senior Championships
Premier Senior	Imokilly
Premier Senior	Bride Rovers
Premier Senior	Erin's Own
Premier Senior	Fr O'Neill's
Premier Senior	Midleton
Premier Senior	Sarsfields
Senior A	Carrigtwohill
Senior A	Castlelyons
Senior A	Killeagh
Senior A	Watergrasshill
Intermediate Championships
Premier Intermediate	Castlemartyr
Premier Intermediate	Cloyne
Premier Intermediate	Dungourney
Premier Intermediate	Lisgoold
Intermediate A	Aghada
Intermediate A	Erin's Own (2)
Intermediate A	Midleton (2)
Intermediate A	Sarsfields (2)
Intermediate A	Youghal
Junior Championships
Premier Junior	Russell Rovers
Premier Junior	St Catherine's
Junior A	Bride Rovers (2)
Junior A	Carrignavar
Junior A	Carrigtwohill (2)
Junior A	Cobh
Junior A	Dungourney (2)
Junior A	Fr O'Neill's (2)
Junior A	Killeagh (2)
Junior A	Midleton (3)
Junior A	Sarsfields (3)
Junior A	St Ita's
Junior A	Watergrasshill (2)
Junior A	Youghal (2)
Junior B	Aghada (2)
Junior B	Bride Rovers (3)
Junior B	Castlelyons (2)
Junior B	Castlemartyr (2)
Junior B	Cloyne (2)
Junior B	Erin's Own (3)
Junior B	Killeagh (3)
Junior B	Lisgoold (2)
Junior B	Midleton (4)
Junior B	St Catherine's (2)
Junior B	Sarsfields (4)
Junior C	Aghada (3)
Junior C	Ballinacurra
Junior C	Carrignavar (2)
Junior C	Carrigtwohill (3)
Junior C	Cobh (2)
Junior C	Erin's Own (4)
Junior C	Killeagh (4)
Junior C	Midleton (5)
Junior C	Russell Rovers (2)
Junior C	St Catherine's (3)
Junior C	Watergrasshill (3)
Junior C	Youghal (3)
Junior D	Bride Rovers (4)
Junior D	Dungourney (3)
Junior D	Fr O'Neill's (3)

== Football ==
=== 2027 Championship Grades ===
Championship	Club
Senior Championships
Premier Senior	Imokilly
Senior A	None
Intermediate Championships
Premier Intermediate	Aghada
Intermediate A	None
Junior Championships
Premier Junior	Cobh
Premier Junior	Glenville
Junior A	Aghada (2)
Junior A	Carrignavar
Junior A	Carrigtwohill
Junior A	Castlemartyr
Junior A	Dungourney
Junior A	Erin's Own
Junior A	Fr. O'Neill's
Junior A	Glenbower Rovers
Junior A	Lisgoold
Junior A	Midleton
Junior A	Youghal
Junior A	St Catherine's
Junior B	Ballinacurra
Junior B	Bride Rovers
Junior B	Castlelyons
Junior B	Cloyne
Junior B	Cobh (2)
Junior B	Glenville (2)
Junior B	Russell Rovers
Junior C	Aghada (3)
Junior C	Ballinacurra (2)
Junior C	Carrignavar (2)
Junior C	Carrigtwohill (2)
Junior C	Castlemartyr (2)
Junior C	Glenbower Rovers (2)
Junior C	Midleton (2)
Junior C	St Catherine's (2)
Junior C	Youghal (2)
Junior D	Cobh (3)
Junior D	Glenville (3)
Junior D	Lisgoold (2)

== Achievements ==
- Cork Premier Senior Hurling Championship
  - (gold) Winners (6): 1997, 1998, 2017, 2018, 2019, 2024
  - (silver) Runners-Up (4): 1949, 1968, 1996, 2001
- Cork Premier Senior Football Championship
  - (gold) Winners (2): 1984, 1986
  - (silver) Runners-Up (1): 1987

== Notable players ==
- Dónal Óg Cusack
- Declan Dalton
- John Fenton
- Séamus Harnedy
- Conor Lehane
- Pearse O'Neill
- Diarmuid O'Sullivan

== Divisional Competitions ==
- East Cork Junior A Hurling Championship
- East Cork Junior A Football Championship

== External sources ==
- Divisional website
- An Illustrated History of the GAA in East Cork 1924-2010 by Tom Morrison
