= Carrignavar GAA =

Irish Gaelic Athletic Association club

Carrignavar
- Carraig na bhFear
- County: Cork
- Colours: Green and red

Playing kits
Standard colours

Senior Club Championships
	All Ireland	Munster champions	Cork champions
Football:	0	0	0
Hurling:	0	0	0

Carrignavar GAA is a Gaelic Athletic Association club located in the village of Carrignavar, County Cork, Ireland. The club fields teams in both hurling and Gaelic football.

== Honours ==
- East Cork Junior A Football Championship (2): 1975, 2025
- East Cork Junior A Hurling Championship (3): 2008, 2012, 2023
