= 1890 Cork Senior Hurling Championship =

Annual hurling competition season

- Dates: 9 March 1890 – 13 July 1890
- Teams: 19
- Champions: Aghabullogue (1st title); Dan Lane (captain)
- Runners-up: Aghada; Dan Higgins (captain)

The 1890 Cork Senior Hurling Championship was the fourth staging of the Cork Senior Hurling Championship since its establishment by the Cork County Board in 1887. The draw for the opening round fixtures took place on 18 February 1890. The championship began on 9 March 1890 and ended on 13 July 1890.

Blackrock were the defending champions.

On 13 July 1890, Aghabullogue won the championship following a 7–3 to 1–1 defeat of Aghada in the final. This remains their only championship title.

== Results ==
=== Final ===
| 13 July 1890 Final | Aghabullogue | 7-03 – 1-01 | Aghada | Blarney Sportsfield |

== Championship statistics ==
=== Miscellaneous ===
- Following their county championship success, Aghabullogue represent Cork in the inter-county championship. They become the first Cork team to win the All-Ireland title.
- Aghabullogue are the first non city club to win the title.
