= 1890 All-Ireland Senior Hurling Championship =

Championship details
- Dates: 3 August 1890 - 16 November 1890
- Teams: 11

All-Ireland champions
- Winning team: Cork (1st win)
- Captain: Dan Lane

All-Ireland Finalists
- Losing team: Wexford
- Captain: Nicholas Daly

Provincial champions
- Munster: Cork
- Leinster: Wexford
- Ulster: Not Played
- Connacht: Not Played

Championship statistics
- No. matches played: 6
- Goals total: 13 (2.1 per game)
- Points total: 35 (5.8 per game)
- All-Star Team: See here

The 1890 All-Ireland Senior Hurling Championship was the fourth staging of the All-Ireland hurling championship since its establishment by the Gaelic Athletic Association in 1887. The championship began on 3 August 1890 and ended on 16 November 1890.

Dublin were the defending champions, however, they were defeated in the provincial series. Cork won the title, after successfully launching an objection having originally been beaten by Wexford in the final.

== Teams ==
A total of eleven teams contested the championship, one more than the previous year.

The Leinster championship was contested by five teams. Kildare made a return to the championship after a one-year absence, however, they failed to field a team and gave a walkover to their opponents.

All six counties entered a team in the Munster championship, however, a number of walkovers meant that only two games were played.

Once again, the hurling championship was not contested in either Connacht or Ulster.

=== General information ===
Eleven counties competed in the All-Ireland Senior Hurling Championship: five teams in the Leinster Senior Hurling Championship and six teams in the Munster Senior Hurling Championship.

| County | Club | Province | Colours | Appearance | Position in 1889 Championship | Provincial Titles | Last provincial title | Championship Titles | Last championship title |
|---|---|---|---|---|---|---|---|---|---|
| Clare | Ennis Dalcassians | Munster | – | 4th | Runners-up | 1 | 1889 | 0 | – |
| Cork | Aghabullogue | Munster | Green and white | 3rd | Semi-finals (Munster Senior Hurling Championship) | 1 | 1888 | 0 | – |
| Dublin | Kickhams | Leinster | Red | 4th | Champions | 1 | 1889 | 1 | 1889 |
| Kerry | Kilmoyley | Munster | Green and yellow | 2nd | Runners-up (Munster Senior Hurling Championship) | 0 | – | 0 | – |
| Kildare | Monasterevin | Leinster | Blue and white | 2nd | – | 0 | – | 0 | – |
| Kilkenny | Bennettsbridge | Leinster | Green and yellow | 4th | Semi-finals (Leinster Senior Hurling Championship) | 1 | 1888 | 0 | – |
| Laois | Clonaslee | Leinster | Red and white | 3rd | Runners-up (Leinster Senior Hurling Championship) | 0 | – | 0 | – |
| Limerick | South Liberties | Munster | Green and white | 3rd | Quarter-finals (Munster Senior Hurling Championship) | 0 | – | 0 | – |
| Tipperary | Toomevara | Munster | Green and yellow | 4th | Semi-finals (Munster Senior Hurling Championship) | 0 | – | 1 | 1887 |
| Waterford | | Munster | – | 3rd | Quarter-finals (Munster Senior Hurling Championship) | 0 | – | 0 | – |
| Wexford | Castlebridge | Leinster | – | 2nd | – | 0 | – | 0 | – |

== Provincial championships ==
=== Leinster Senior Hurling Championship ===
Quarter-finals

| 3 August 1890 Quarter-final | Wexford | 1–03 – 0–02 | Kilkenny | Waterford |
| | | | | Referee: D Fraher |

Semi-finals

| 17 August 1890 Semi-final | Laois | w/o – scr. | Kildare | Clonturk Park |
| | | | | Referee: P. Tobin |

| 5 October 1890 Semi-final | Wexford | 4–01 – 0–01 | Dublin | Clonturk Park |
| | | | | Attendance: 4,000; Referee: J. J. Kenny |

Final

| 19 October 1890 Final | Wexford | 2–09 – 0–03 | Laois | Clonturk Park |
| | | | | Attendance: 5,000; Referee: J. Hayes |

=== Munster Senior Hurling Championship ===
Quarter-finals

| Quarter-final | Clare | w/o – scr. | Tipperary |

| 3 August 1890 Quarter-final | Kerry | 1–06 – 0–01 | Limerick | Tralee |
| | | | | Referee: F. B. Dineen |

Semi-finals

| 17 August 1890 Semi-final | Cork | w/o – scr. | Waterford | Youghal |

| 14 September 1890 Semi-final | Kerry | w/o – scr. | Clare | Limerick |

Final

| 28 September 1890 Final | Cork | 2–00 – 0–01 | Kerry | Markets Field |
| | | | | Referee: J Sheehy (Limerick) |

== All-Ireland Senior Hurling Championship ==
Final

| 16 November 1890 Final | Cork | 1–06 – 2–02 | Wexford | Clonturk Park |
| | | | | Attendance: 1,000; Referee: J Sheehy (Limerick) |

== Championship statistics ==
=== Miscellaneous ===
- The Leinster quarter-final between Wexford and Kilkenny was played in Waterford. It was the first time that a game from the Leinster championship was played at a Munster venue.
- In the provincial championships Cork win their first Munster title and Wexford win their first Leinster title.
- The All-Ireland final between Cork and Wexford was the first championship meeting between the two teams. The game was unfinished and Cork awarded the title after Cork withdraw on the grounds of excessively rough play by the opposition.

== Sources ==
- Corry, Eoghan, The GAA Book of Lists (Hodder Headline Ireland, 2005).
- Donegan, Des, The Complete Handbook of Gaelic Games (DBA Publications Limited, 2005).
