= 1890 All-Ireland Senior Hurling Championship final =

1890 All-Ireland Senior Hurling Final
- Event: 1890 All-Ireland Senior Hurling Championship
Cork	Wexford
1-6	2-2
- Date: 16 November 1890
- Venue: Clonturk Park, Dublin
- Referee: John Sheehy (Limerick)
- Attendance: 1,000

The 1890 All-Ireland Senior Hurling Championship Final was the 3rd All-Ireland Final and the culmination of the 1890 All-Ireland Senior Hurling Championship, an inter-county hurling tournament for the top teams in Ireland. The match was held at Clonturk Park, Dublin, on 16 November 1890, between Cork represented by the Aghabullogue club and Wexford represented by the Castlebridge club. The match was abandoned by the Cork team due to rough play by their opponents, with Wexford leading 2–2 to 1-6 (at the time, a goal was worth more than any number of points). Cork were later awarded the title.

== Match details ==
16 November 1890

Cork	1-6 – 2-2 Unfinished	Wexford

Clonturk Park, Dublin
Attendance: 1,000
Referee: John Sheehy (Limerick)

Cork Team Jeremiah Hichion, Dan Drew, John Buckley, Dan Lane, T Toomey, Michael Horgan, Thady O'Connor, Pat Buckley, John Kelleher, J Reilly, Thady Kelleher, Pat O'Riordan, Tom Goode, D O'Sullivan, D Horgan, Ger O'Sullivan, Jackie Linehan, Pat O'Riordan, E Reilly
