= Aghabullogue GAA =

Gaelic games club in County Cork, Ireland

Aghabullogue
- Achadh Bolg
- Founded: 1884
- County: Cork
- Colours
- Grounds: Coachford Sportsfield
- Coordinates: 51°54′24″N 8°47′12″W

Playing kits
Standard colours

Senior Club Championships
	All Ireland	Munster champions	Cork champions
Hurling:	0	0	1

Aghabullogue GAA Club is a Gaelic Athletic Association club in Coachford, County Cork, Ireland. The club is affiliated to the Muskerry Board and fields teams in both hurling and Gaelic football.

== History ==
Located in the parish of Aghabullogue and centred in the village of Coachford, about 24km west of Cork, Aghabullogue GAA Club was founded in the early years of the Gaelic Athletic Association. The newly-created club was solely a hurling one and entered a team in the inaugural Cork SHC in 1887. Three years later, Aghabullogue became the first club from outside the city to win the Cork SHC title. The club subsequently represented the county in the inter-county series of games and brought Cork their first All-Ireland SHC title.

Aghabullogue won the Cork IHC in 1910, however, the club slipped down the grades in the decades that followed and eventually played in the junior divisional grade. Aghabullogue won 16 Mid Cork JAHC titles between 1937 and 1998 to put them in second place on the all-time roll of honour. The club claimed their sole Cork JAHC title after beating Aghada in a final replay in 1991.

The club started fielding a Gaelic football team in 1979, however, it would be 25 years before Aghabullogue won the Mid Cork JAFC. This was subsequently converted into a Cork JAFC title after a 1–09 to 1–07 win over Adrigole. In 2023, Aghabullogue completed an IAHC–IAFC double after wins over Midleton and Mitchelstown. The club secured senior status for the first time in their history in 2025, after claiming the Cork PIFC following a one-point win over Iveleary.

== Roll of honour ==
- All-Ireland Senior Hurling Championship (1): 1890
- Munster Senior Hurling Championship (1): 1890
- Cork Senior Hurling Championship (1): 1890
- Cork Premier Intermediate Football Championship (1): 2025
- Cork Intermediate A Football Championship (1): 2023
- Cork Intermediate A Hurling Championship (3): 1910, 2023, 2025
- Cork Junior A Football Championship (1): 2004
- Cork Junior A Hurling Championship (1): 1991
- Cork Junior B Inter-Divisional Hurling Championship (1) 2019
- Mid Cork Junior A Football Championship (1): 2004
- Mid Cork Junior A Hurling Championship (16): 1937, 1949, 1952, 1954, 1955, 1973, 1974, 1976, 1981, 1983, 1984, 1986, 1988, 1989, 1991, 1998
- Cork Minor A Hurling Championship (1): 1996

== Notable players ==
- Dan Lane: All-Ireland SHC-winning captain (1890)
- Paul Ring: All-Ireland U20FC-winner (2019)
