= Aghada GAA =

Gaelic games club in County Cork, Ireland

Aghada
- Ath Fhada
- Founded: 1885
- County: Cork
- Colours
- Grounds: Páirc Uí Riain
- Coordinates: 51°50′55″N 8°11′34″W

Playing kits
Standard colours

Senior Club Championships
	All Ireland	Munster champions	Cork champions
Ladies' football:	0	0	2

Aghada GAA Club is a Gaelic Athletic Association club in Aghada, County Cork, Ireland. The club is affiliated to the East Cork Board and fields teams in both hurling and Gaelic football.

== History ==
Located in the village of Aghada, about 12km from Midleton, Aghada GAA Club was established in 1885 and was one of the first clubs to affiliate to the newly-created GAA. The new club played a number of hurling tournament games throughout 1886 and fielded two teams in the inaugural Cork SHC in 1887. Aghada entered a Gaelic football team in the 1888 Cork SFC.

Aghada was a prominent force in the first decade of the Cork SHC. The club reached the final for the first time in 1889, but gave a walkover to Blackrock after a dispute. Aghada later lost finals to Aghabullogue in 1890 and Blackrock in 1897.

Aghada affiliated to the new East Cork Board in 1924 and spent much of the next century fielding teams in the junior grade. Hurling, once again, was the dominant code with the club winning six East Cork JAHC titles. Aghada won four East Cork JAFC titles between 1980 and 1989, with the last of these victories being converted into a Cork JAFC title. The club secured senior status two years later in 1991, after beating Ballincollig by 0–09 to 0–08 to claim the Cork IFC title.

Aghada's most recent success came in 2017, when the club won the Cork IHC title, after a 0–16 to 0–09 defeat of Éire Óg in the final.

== Honours ==
- Cork LGFA Senior A Football Championship (2): 20242026
- Cork Intermediate Hurling Championship (1): 2017
- Cork Intermediate Football Championship (1): 1991
- Cork Junior A Football Championship (1): 1989
- East Cork Junior A Football Championship (4): 1980, 1981, 1983, 1989
- East Cork Junior A Hurling Championship (6): 1931, 1933, 1940, 1980, 1991, 1992
- East Cork Under-21 A Football Championship (7): 2014, 2015, 2016, 2017, 2018, 2019, 2024
- East Cork Under-21 B Football Championship (1): 2013
- East Cork Under-21 B Hurling Championship (1): 1990
- Cork Minor B Football Championship (2): 2008, 2014
- All-Ireland Football Sevens (1): 2003

== Notable players ==
- Conor Counihan: All-Ireland SFC–winning player (1989, 1990) and All-Ireland SFC–winning manager (2010)
- Kieran O'Connor: All-Ireland SFC–winning player (2010)
- Pearse O'Neill: All-Ireland SFC–winning player (2010)
