= Ciarán Joyce =

Irish hurler

Personal information
- Native name: Ciarán Seoige (Irish)
- Born: 2002 (age 23–24) Castlemartyr, County Cork, Ireland
- Occupation: Student
- Height: 6 ft 1 in (185 cm)

Sport
- Sport: Hurling
- Position: Centre-back
Clubs
- Years: Club
- 2020– 2021–: Castlemartyr → Imokilly
Club titles
- Cork titles: 1
College
- Years: College
- 2021–: MTU Cork
College titles
- Fitzgibbon titles: 0
Inter-county*
Years	County	Apps (scores)
2021–	Cork	22 (0–02)
Inter-county titles
- Munster titles: 1
- All-Irelands: 0
- NHL: 1
- All Stars: 1
- *Inter County team apps and scores correct as of 21:52, 9 July 2025.

Ciarán Joyce (born 2002) is an Irish hurler. At club level he plays with Castlemartyr, divisional side Imokilly and at inter-county level with the Cork senior team.

== Early life ==
Born and raised in Castlemartyr, County Cork, Joyce first played hurling to a high standard as a student at Midleton CBS. He progressed through the various age grades before joining the school's senior team in 2018. Joyce's first year as a senior ended with a 2–12 to 0–14 defeat of Christian Brothers College Cork in the 2019 Harty Cup final. He added a Dr O'Callaghan Cup medal to his collection in February 2020 after a 3–24 to 1–15 defeat of St Francis College in the final. Joyce later studied at Munster Technological University Cork and was added to their Fitzgibbon Cup panel in 2023.

== Club career ==
Joyce began his club career at juvenile and underage levels with a Castlemartyr-Dungourney amalgamation known as Kiltha Óg. He won a Cork Premier 2 U14 Championship-League double in 2016, before claiming a Cork Premier 2 MHC title in 2018 after 2–13 to 0–12 defeat of Bandon.

Joyce made his first appearance for Castlemartyr's adult team in 3–13 to 2–13 defeat of St Finbarr's in August 2020. He ended his debut season with a Cork LIHC medal after a 1–20 to 0–11 defeat of Russell Rovers in the final. Joyce added a Cork IAHC title to his collection in November 2021 after being named man of the match in the 1–19 to 0–12 defeat of Sarsfields.

As a member of the Imokilly divisional team, Joyce won back-to-back Denis O'Riordan Cup titles in 2022 and 2023.

== Inter-county career ==
Joyce first appeared on the inter-county scene with Cork as a member of the minor team during their unsuccessful Munster MHC campaign in 2019. He immediately progressed to Cork's under-20 team in 2020. Success in this grade was immediate with Joyce claiming Munster and All-Ireland U20HC medals in his first year after respective defeats of Tipperary and Dublin. He claimed a second successive Munster U20HC medal after a two-point defeat of Limerck in 2021. Joyce's last game in the grade saw him claim a second successive winners' medal after a defeat of Galway in the 2021 All-Ireland U20 final.

Joyce had one more year of under-20 hurling, however, his inclusion on the senior team in December 2021 made him ineligible for the grade. He was at left corner-back when Cork lost the 2022 National League final to Waterford. Joyce was a GAA/GPA Young Hurler of the Year nominee in November 2023.

== Career statistics ==
As of 20 July 2025

Team	Year	National League			Munster		All-Ireland		Total	
Team	Year	Division	Apps	Score	Apps	Score	Apps	Score	Apps	Score
Cork	2022	Division 1A	5	0–6	4	0–0	2	0–0	11	0–6
Cork	2023	Division 1A	4	0–1	4	0–0	—		8	0–1
Cork	2024	Division 1A	3	0–3	2	0–1	4	0–0	9	0–4
Cork	2025	Division 1A	5	0–2	5	0–0	2	0–1	12	0–3
Career total			17	0–12	15	0–1	8	0–1	40	0–14

== Honours ==
Midleton CBS

- Harty Cup: 2019

Kiltha Óg

- Cork Premier 2 Minor Hurling Championship: 2018
- Cork Premier 2 Under-14 Hurling Championship: 2016

Castlemartyr

- Cork Intermediate A Hurling Championship: 2021
- Cork Lower Intermediate Hurling Championship: 2020
- East Cork Junior A Football Championship: 2024

Imokilly

- Cork Premier Senior Hurling Championship 2024
- Denis O'Riordan Cup: 2022, 2023, 2024, 2025

Cork

- Munster Senior Hurling Championship: 2025
- National Hurling League: 2025
- All-Ireland Under-20 Hurling Championship: 2020, 2021
- Munster Under-20 Hurling Championship: 2020, 2021

Individual

- The Sunday Game Team of the Year (1): 2025
- All Star Award (1): 2025
