= 2021 Cork Lower Intermediate Hurling Championship =

- Dates: 12 September - 20 November 2021
- Teams: 12
- Sponsor: Co-Op Superstores
- Champions: Lisgoold (1st title); John Cronin (captain); Mossie O'Connell (manager)
- Runners-up: Kilbrittain; Jamie Wall (manager)
- Relegated: Grenagh

Tournament statistics
- Matches played: 24
- Goals scored: 46 (1.92 per match)
- Points scored: 837 (34.88 per match)

The 2021 Cork Lower Intermediate Hurling Championship was the second and final staging of the Cork Lower Intermediate Hurling Championship since its establishment by the Cork County Board in 2020. The draw for the group stage placings took place on 29 April 2021. The championship began on 12 September 2021 and ended on 20 November 2021.

The final was played on 20 November 2021 at Páirc Uí Chaoimh in Cork, between Lisgoold and Kilbrittain, in what was their first ever meeting in a final in this grade. Lisgoold won the match by 2-19 to 0-14 to claim their first championship title.

== Team changes ==
=== To Championship ===
Promoted from the Cork Junior A Hurling Championship

- Lisgoold

Relegated from the Cork Intermediate A Hurling Championship

- Argideen Rangers

=== From Championship ===
Promoted to the Cork Intermediate A Hurling Championship

- Castlemartyr

Relegated to the South East Junior A Hurling Championship

- Ballymartle

== Results ==
=== Group A ===
==== Table ====
Advance to play-offs Advance to relegation play-offs

Team	Matches				Score			Pts
Team	Pld	W	D	L	For	Against	Diff	Pts
Kilbrittain	3	3	0	0	3-63	1-29	40	6
Argideen Rangers	3	2	0	1	5-43	2-42	10	4
Dripsey	3	1	0	2	1-34	5-49	-27	2
Grenagh	3	0	0	3	2-26	3-46	-23	0

==== Results ====
12 September 2021 Round 1	Argideen Rangers	1-09 - 0-19	Kilbrittain	Charlie Hurley Park
	S Walsh 1-1, JM O'Callaghan 0-4, B Fleming 0-2, A Guinevan 0-1, F Butler 0-1.	Report	M Sexton 0-8, P Wall 0-4, C Ustionowski 0-2, R Cashman 0-2, C Sheehan 0-1, J O'Donovan 0-1, M Madden 0-1.

12 September 2021 Round 1	Dripsey	0-12 - 1-05	Grenagh	Ballyanley Sportsground
		Report

19 September 2021 Round 2	Grenagh	1-14 - 2-14	Argideen Rangers	Cloughduv GAA Grounds
	N O'Doherty 0-11, K O'Neill 1-0, D Coleman 0-2, S Cronin 0-1.	Report	JM O'Callaghan 1-11, S Walsh 1-0, C O'Donovan 0-1, P Butler 0-1, F Butler 0-1.

19 September 2021 Round 2	Kilbrittain	2-24 - 0-13	Dripsey	Charlie Hurley Park
	J O'Donovan 1-7, M Sexton 0-7, P Wall 1-2, T Harrington 0-3, C Ustianowski 0-3, D Harrington 0-1, R Cashman 0-1.	Report	M O'Riordan 0-7, D O'Sullivan 0-2, J O'Riordan 0-1, G Murphy 0-1, E Maher 0-1, M O'Sullivan 0-1.

9 October 2021 Round 3	Kilbrittain	1-20 - 0-07	Grenagh	Ballinora GAA Grounds
		Report

9 October 2021 Round 3	Argideen Rangers	2-20 - 1-09	Dripsey	Ballinhassig GAA Grounds
	S Walsh 1-3, F Butler, JM O’Callaghan 0-4 (3f) each, M Lawton 1-1, B Fleming, L O’Leary, D O’Donovan 0-2 each, C O’Donovan, S Henchion 0-1.	Report	M O’Riordan 0-6 (5f), G Murphy1-0, J O’Riordan, D O’Sullivan, D O‘Riordan 0-1 each.

=== Group B ===
==== Table ====
Advance to play-offs Advance to relegation play-offs

Team	Matches				Score			Pts
Team	Pld	W	D	L	For	Against	Diff	Pts
Lisgoold	3	3	0	0	4-64	0-50	26	6
Tracton	3	2	0	1	1-57	3-51	0	4
St. Finbarr's	3	1	0	2	2-49	1-60	-8	2
Russell Rovers	3	0	0	3	0-48	3-57	-18	0

==== Results ====
12 September 2021 Round 1	Russell Rovers	0-17 - 0-19	Tracton	Riverstown Sportsfield

12 September 2021 Round 1	St. Finbarr's	0-16 - 0-25	Lisgoold	Páirc Uí Chonaill
		Report

19 September 2021 Round 2	Lisgoold	2-21 - 0-19	Russell Rovers	Jamesy Kelleher Memorial Park
	L O'Shea 1-14.	Report

19 September 2021 Round 2	Tracton	1-23 - 1-16	St. Finbarr's	Ballinhassig GAA Grounds

9 October 2021 Round 3	Tracton	0-15 - 2-18	Lisgoold	Páirc Uí Rinn
		Report	L O'Shea 0-8.

9 October 2021 Round 3	Russell Rovers	0-12 - 1-17	St. Finbarr's	Felix Sarsfield Memorial Park
		Report

=== Group C ===
==== Table ====
Advance to play-offs

Team	Matches				Score			Pts
Team	Pld	W	D	L	For	Against	Diff	Pts
Milford	3	2	0	1	5-50	2-51	8	4
Ballygarvan	3	2	0	1	3-46	4-42	1	4
St. Catherine's	3	2	0	1	6-41	4-48	-1	4
Barryroe	3	0	0	3	2-45	6-41	-8	0

==== Results ====
12 September 2021 Round 1	St Catherine's	2-18 - 2-16	Milford	Mitchelstown GAA Grounds
	E Davis 2-5, B Mulcahy 0-5, D Mangan 0-3 (0-1 s/l), B Davis 0-2, S Cotter 0-2, R Galvin 0-1.	Report	S O'Connell 0-7f, B Murphy 0-5 (0-4f), A Watson 1-1, T Curran 1-1, M Sheehy 0-1, C O'Gorman 0-1.

12 September 2021 Round 1	Ballygarvan	2-14 - 1-12	Barryroe	Brinny Sportsfield
	M Kennefick 0-6 (1f); C Dowd 1-2 (2f); R O’Halloran 1-0; S Fenton 0-2; D O’Connor, G White, C McIntyre, Damien O’Sullivan 0-1 each. Barryroe:	Report	A McSweeney 0-8 (7f); R Kiely 1-0; R O’Donovan 0-2; M Crowley, J Murphy 0-1 each.

19 September 2021 Round 2	Barryroe	1-16 - 3-12	St Catherine's	Éire Óg GAA Grounds
		Report	E Davis (2-09), B Mulcahy (1-0), D Mangan, R Galvin and S Cotter (0-01 each).

19 September 2021 Round 2	Milford	2-19 - 0-16	Ballygarvan	Clyda Rovers GAA Grounds
		Report

9 October 2021 Round 3	Milford	1-15 - 0-17	Barryroe	Éire Óg GAA Grounds
	B Murphy 1-4 (2f), E Dillon 0-3 (f), C O’Gorman 0-3 (f); B Villiers 0-1, A Watson 0-1, T O’Flynn 0-1, M Sheehy 0-1, S O'Connell 0-1.	Report	A McSweeney 0-11 (8f), R O’Donovan 0-3, J Moloney 0-1 (f), B O’Donovan 0-1, T Kearney 0-1.

9 October 2021 Round 3	St Catherine's	1-11 - 1-16	Ballygarvan	Bride Rovers Park
	E Davis (0-07 frees), E Condon (1-00), T O’Donnell (0-02), B Mulcahy and C Hegarty (0-01 each).

=== Relegation stage ===
==== Playoff ====
23 October 2021 Playoff	Grenagh	0-05 - 3-24	Russell Rovers	Riverstown Sportsfield
	N Doherty 0-3 f, S Cronin, C Buckley 0-1 each.	Report	B Hartnett 1-10 (0-6 f), L Duggan Murray 0-7, P Cummins 2-0, J McGrath, K Walsh, D Ruddy 0-2 each, D Moynihan, E O’Sullivan 0-1 each.

=== Knockout stage ===
==== Quarter-finals ====
23 October 2021 Quarter-final	Milford	1-12 - 2-13	Tracton	Mallow GAA Complex
	C O'Gorman 1-2 (0-1 f), E Dillon 0-4 (0-2 65, 0-1 f), S O'Connell 0-2 f, T Curran 0-2, D Hannigan, A Watson 0-1 each.	Report	M O'Sullivan 2-2, R Walsh 0-7 (0-4 f), J Good, C McGuinness, P O'Riordan, A Kiely 0-1 each.

30 October 2021 Quarter-final	Argideen Rangers	2-11 - 0-18	Ballygarvan	Páirc Uí Riagáin
	B Fleming 0-6, B Hennessy 1-0, JM O'Callaghan 1-0, C O'Donovan 0-1, F Walsh 0-1, S Henchion 0-1, P Butler 0-1, S Walsh 0-1.		C Dowd 0-8, R O'Halloran 0-4, D McCarthy 0-2, S Fenton 0-1, M Cussen 0-1, P O'Halloran 0-1, D O'Sullivan 0-1.

==== Semi-finals ====
6 November 2021 Semi-final	Kilbrittain	1-15 - 0-09	Tracton	Páirc Uí Riagáin
	M Sexton (0-7 f) 0-8, T Harrington 1-3, C Sheehan 0-2, P Wall, C Ustinowski.	Report	D Byrne (0-2 f) 0-5, R Walsh (0-1 f) 0-3, C McGuinness 0-1.

6 November 2021 Semi-final	Lisgoold	1-16 - 0-15	Ballygarvan	Páirc Uí Rinn
	L O'Shea 0-8 (0-6 f), J Cashman 0-3, J O'Driscoll 1-0, M Hegarty 0-2, C Hickey (f), K Cashman, J Ryan 0-1 each.	Report	C Dowd 0-5 (0-4 f, 0-1 65), M Kennefick 0-3, S Fenton, G White 0-2 each, R O'Halloran, P Sexton, D O'Sullivan 0-1 each.

==== Final ====
20 November 2021 Final	Lisgoold	2-19 - 0-14	Kilbrittain	Páirc Uí Chaoimh
	L O’Shea 1-4 (0-1 f), M Hegarty 1-3, C Hallahan, C Hickey 0-3 each, J Cronin, J O’Driscoll, J Cashman 0-2 each.	Report	M Sexton 0-6 f, R Cashman 0-3 (0-2 f), P Wall 0-2, J O’Donovan, S Shortan, A Holland 0-1 each.	Referee: L O'Riordan (Belgooly)
