= 2021 Cork Intermediate A Hurling Championship =

- Dates: 11 September - 20 November 2021
- Teams: 12
- Sponsor: Co-Op Superstores
- Champions: Castlemartyr (1st title); Brian Lawton (captain); Daragh Moran (captain); Séamus Lawton (manager)
- Runners-up: Sarsfields
- Relegated: Glen Rovers

Tournament statistics
- Matches played: 24
- Goals scored: 59 (2.46 per match)
- Points scored: 804 (33.5 per match)

The 2021 Cork Intermediate A Hurling Championship was the second staging of the Cork Intermediate A Hurling Championship and the 112th staging overall of a championship for middle-ranking intermediate hurling teams in Cork. The draw for the group stage placings took place on 29 April 2021. The championship began on 11 September 2021 and ended on 20 November 2021.

The final was played on 20 November 2021 at Páirc Uí Chaoimh in Cork, between Castlemartyr and Sarsfields, in what was their first ever meeting in a final in this grade. Castlemartyr won the match by 1–19 to 0–12 to claim their first championship title.

== Participating teams ==
The seedings were based on final group stage positions from the 2020 championship.

Top seeds Second seeds Third seeds Fourth seeds

Team	Location	Colours	Seeding
Blackrock	Blackrock	Green and yellow	1
Aghabullogue	Coachford	Green and yellow	2
Kildorrery	Kildorrery	Blue and white	3
Sarsfields	Glanmire	Blue, white and black	4
Mayfield	Mayfield	Red and white	5
Cloughduv	Cloughduv	Green and yellow	6
Midleton	Midleton	Black and white	7
Dungourney	Dungourney	Green and yellow	8
Douglas	Douglas	Green, black and white	9
Meelin	Meelin	Green and yellow	10
Glen Rovers	Blackpool	Green, black and yellow	11
Castlemartyr	Castlemartyr	Red and white	12

== Group A ==
=== Table ===
Advance to knockout stage Advance to relegation play-off

Team	Matches				Score			Pts
Team	Pld	W	D	L	For	Against	Diff	Pts
Sarsfields	3	3	0	0	5-47	3-41	12	6
Aghabullogue	3	2	0	1	5-54	5-46	8	4
Dungourney	3	1	0	2	5-52	6-52	-3	2
Glen Rovers	3	0	0	3	2-51	3-65	-17	0

=== Fixtures and results ===
12 September 2021 Round 1	Dungourney	1-26 - 1-19	Glen Rovers	Páirc Shéamuis de Barra

12 September 2021 Round 1	Aghabullogue	0-16 - 3-13	Sarsfields	Church Road

19 September 2021 Round 2	Glen Rovers	1-20 - 2-22	Aghabullogue	Ballincollig GAA Grounds

19 September 2021 Round 2	Sarsfields	2-17 - 3-13	Dungourney	Páirc Lios gCúl

9 October 2021 Round 3	Aghabullogue	3-16 - 1-13	Dungourney	Páirc Uí Rinn

9 October 2021 Round 3	Sarsfields	0-17 - 0-12	Glen Rovers	Blarney GAA Grounds

== Group B ==
=== Table ===
Advance to knockout stage Advance to relegation play-off

Team	Matches				Score			Pts
Team	Pld	W	D	L	For	Against	Diff	Pts
Castlemartyr	3	3	0	0	5-75	5-52	23	6
Mayfield	3	2	0	1	3-55	0-49	15	4
Douglas	3	1	0	2	2-50	3-64	-17	2
Blackrock	3	0	0	3	3-42	3-57	-15	0

=== Fixtures and results ===
11 September 2021 Round 1	Blackrock	1-10 - 0-20	Mayfield	Ballinlough Park

12 September 2021 Round 1	Douglas	1-20 - 3-29	Castlemartyr	Castlelyons GAA Grounds

19 September 2021 Round 2	Castlemartyr	2-22 - 2-15	Blackrock	Páirc Uí Chonaill

19 September 2021 Round 2	Mayfield	0-18 - 0-15	Douglas	St. Vincent's Park

9 October 2021 Round 3	Mayfield	2-17 - 0-24	Castlemartyr	Erin's Own GAA Grounds

9 October 2021 Round 3	Blackrock	0-17 - 1-15	Douglas	Ballinlough Park

== Group C ==
=== Table ===
Advance to knockout stage

Team	Matches				Score			Pts
Team	Pld	W	D	L	For	Against	Diff	Pts
Cloughduv	3	2	1	0	4-62	4-53	9	5
Midleton	3	2	0	1	5-50	1-54	8	4
Kildorrery	3	1	1	1	2-44	4-42	-4	3
Meelin	3	0	0	3	2-45	4-52	-13	0

=== Fixtures and results ===
11 September 2021 Round 1	Kildorrery	1-17 - 1-17	Cloughduv	Mourne Abbey
	P O'Brien 0-9, J Keating 0-4, D Kent 1-0, C Harrington 0-3, W Fouhy 0-1.		B Verling 0-10, M Verling 1-2, M Walsh 0-2, S O'Connor 0-1, B Aherne 0-1, O O'Driscoll 0-1.

12 September 2021 Round 1	Midleton	1-18 - 0-16	Meelin	O'Connell Park

17 September 2021 Round 2	Meelin	1-08 - 1-12	Kildorrery	Newtownshandrum GAA Grounds
	J O'Callaghan 0-4, J Curtin 1-0, J Forrest 0-2, M O'Keeffe 0-1, SM O'Sullivan 0-1.		F Stapleton 0-4, J Keating 0-4, E O'Connor 1-0, W Fouhy 0-1, D Kelly 0-1, P O'Brien 0-1, D Kent 0-1.

18 September 2021 Round 2	Cloughduv	1-23 - 2-15	Midleton	Ballinora GAA Grounds

9 October 2021 Round 3	Cloughduv	2-22 - 1-21	Meelin	Kanturk GAA Grounds

9 October 2021 Round 3	Kildorrery	0-15 - 2-17	Midleton	Páirc Mac Gearailt
	P O'Brien 0-8, J Keating 0-4, M Walsh 0-1, F Stapleton 0-1, C Harrington 0-1.		A Mulcahy 0-14, A Quirke 1-1, G Manley 1-0, I Kennefick 0-2.

== Knockout stage ==
=== Relegation playoff ===
23 October 2021 Playoff	Glen Rovers	2-12 - 1-16	Blackrock	Ballincollig GAA Grounds

=== Quarter-finals ===
23 October 2021 Quarter-final	Cloughduv	2-21 - 0-07	Aghabullogue	Éire Óg GAA Grounds

23 October 2021 Quarter-final	Mayfield	3-14 - 2-07	Midleton	Páirc Uí Chonaill

=== Semi-finals ===
5 November 2021 Semi-final	Sarsfields	1-15 - 0-15	Mayfield	Páirc Uí Rinn
	E O'Sullivan 1-5, S O'Driscoll 0-3, J O'Leary 0-2, N Fitzpatrick 0-1, K Walsh 0-1, T Óg Murphy 0-1, C McCarthy 0-1, B Graham 0-1.		D O'Neill 0-6, N Kelly 0-4, G Lehane 0-1, S Keegan 0-1, MJ Coffey 0-1, K Punch 0-1, D Lucey 0-1.

6 November 2021 Semi-final	Castlemartyr	3-21 - 2-18	Cloughduv	Páirc Uí Rinn

=== Final ===
20 November 2021 Final	Sarsfields	0-12 - 1-19	Castlemartyr	Páirc Uí Chaoimh
	E O’Sullivan 0-9 (0-7 f, 02 65), S O’Driscoll, C Duggan, J Flannery 0-1 each.	Report	M Kelly 0-7 (0-4 f), Barry Lawton 0-4, Joe Stack 1-1, A Kelly 0-3, E Martin, N Madden, C Joyce, B Ó Tuama 0-1 each.	Referee: D Copps (Ballyhea)
