= Ciarán Cronin =

Cork hurler

Ciaran Cronin
Personal information
- Native name: Ciarán Ó Cronín (Irish)
- Nickname: Patch
- Born: 22 April 1988 (age 38) Lisgoold, County Cork
- Occupation: Accountant

Sport
- Position: Goalkeeper
Club
- Years: Club
- 2004–: Lisgoold

Ciarán Ó Cronín (born 1988) is an Irish sportsman.

He plays hurling with his local club Lisgoold. He is goalkeeper for the Lisgoold GAA team since 2004. He was involved in the last Cork School team to win the Harty Cup in 2006 with Midleton CBS. He was a member of the Cork senior team, when he was called up due to the 2008 panels strike. He scored a goal from a puck out for his club vs Carrig na bhfear in a league game in 2016.
