= Willie Moore (Cork hurler) =

Irish hurler

Personal information
- Native name: Liam Ó Mordha (Irish)
- Born: 1931 Lisgoold, County Cork, Ireland
- Died: 24 April 2003 (aged 71) Lisgoold, County Cork, Ireland
- Occupation: Farmer
- Height: 5 ft 8 in (173 cm)

Sport
- Sport: Hurling
- Position: Midfield
Clubs
- Years: Club
- Lisgoold; Bride Rovers; Carrigtwohill; Imokilly
Club titles
- Cork titles: 0
Inter-county
Years	County	Apps (scores)
1950-1957	Cork	6 (0-01)
Inter-county titles
- Munster titles: 1
- All-Irelands: 1
- NHL: 0

William Moore (1931 – 24 April 2003) was an Irish hurler, who played as a midfielder, and is best known for his partnership with Gerald Murphy on the Cork senior hurling team.

== Career ==
Moore first came to prominence as a hurler at colleges level with St. Colman's College in Fermoy. At club level he enjoyed a distinguished career with a variety of clubs, including Lisgoold, Bride Rovers and Carrigtwohill, while he was also selected for divisional side Imokilly.

At inter-county level Moore first played for the Cork minor hurling team in 1948, however, his two seasons in this grade ended without championship success. He made his debut for the Cork senior hurling team during the 1950 championship, however, he was dropped from the panel shortly afterwards. Impressive form at club level saw Moore return to the Cork senior team in 1954. It was a successful season that culminated with the winning of an All-Ireland Championship medal at midfield. Moore was once again dropped from the panel but made one final appearance in 1957.

== Honours ==
Cork

- All-Ireland Senior Hurling Championship (1): 1954
- Munster Senior Hurling Championship (1): 1954
