= Cork Lower Intermediate Hurling Championship =

Irish sporting event (2020-2021)

- Code: Hurling
- Founded: 2020
- Abolished: 2022
- Region: Cork (GAA)
- No. of teams: 12
- Most titles: Castlemartyr; Lisgoold (1 titles)
- Sponsors: Co-Op Superstores
- Official website: Cork GAA

The Cork Lower Intermediate Hurling Championship (abbreviated to the Cork LIHC) was a hurling competition organised by the Cork County Board of the Gaelic Athletic Association for two seasons from 2020 to 2021. It was contested by the third tier intermediate clubs in the county of Cork in Ireland and was the fifth tier overall in the entire Cork hurling championship system.

The Cork LIHC contained 12 clubs, divided into three groups of four. The round robin stage was followed by a knockout stage for the top two teams in each group. The final was usually played at Páirc Uí Rinn.

The championship was created in an effort to restructure the entire Cork hurling championship system and ceased to exist after 2021. The fifth tier championship was rebranded as the Cork Premier Junior Hurling Championship.

== History ==
=== Development ===
On 26 March 2019, three championship proposals were circulated to Cork club delegates after an expensive review process of the entire Cork championship system. A core element running through all three proposals, put together by the Cork GAA games workgroup, was that there be a group stage of 12 teams, as well as straight relegation and promotion. On 2 April 2019, a majority of 136 club delegates voted for Option A which provided for one round of games played in April and two more in August – all with inter-county players available.

Prior to the restructuring there were 61 hurling teams spread across Senior (19), Premier Intermediate (16) and Intermediate (26). The plan proposed to gradually reduce the number of teams to 48 come the beginning of the 2022 championships. In order to achieve this figure, the Lower Intermediate Hurling Championship was to be in operation for 2020 and 2021. At the end of 2021, it was proposed that these additional teams be regraded to Junior and the championship be discontinued.

=== Beginnings ===
The inaugural championship was scheduled to begin in April 2020, however, it was postponed indefinitely due to the coronavirus pandemic in Ireland. When the championship resumed, time constraints led to a revision of the format, with the play-offs for the second best and third best third placed teams being abolished. The knockout stage was further reduced, with the two best-ranking teams from the group stage receiving byes to the semi-finals and the other four qualifying teams contesting two lone quarter-finals. The very first matches eventually took place on 1 August 2020, with St. Catherine's claiming the very first victory after a 0-15 to 0-14 win over Tracton.

=== Abolition ===
On 1 February 2022, the Cork County Board took a vote on the future of the club junior and intermediate championships. Delegates voted in favour of Option B which saw the Lower Intermediate Championship being rebranded as the Premier Junior Championship.

== Format ==
=== Group stage ===
The 12 teams were divided into three groups of four. Over the course of the group stage, each team played once against the others in the group, resulting in each team being guaranteed at least three games. Two points were awarded for a win, one for a draw and zero for a loss. The teams were ranked in the group stage table by points gained, then scoring difference and then their head-to-head record. The top two teams in each group qualified for the knockout stage.

=== Knockout stage ===
Quarter-finals: Two lone quarter-finals featured the four lowest-placed qualifying teams from the group stage. Two teams qualified for the next round.

Semi-finals: The two quarter-final winners and the top two highest-placed qualifying team from the group stage contested this round. The two winners from these games advanced to the final.

Final: The two semi-final winners contested the final. The winning team were declared champions.

=== Promotion and relegation ===
At the end of the championship, the winning team was automatically promoted to the Cork Intermediate A Championship for the following season. The two worst-ranked teams from the group stage took part in a playoff, with the losing team being relegated to the Cork Junior A Championship.

=== Participating teams ===
The following 14 teams took part in the championship during its two-year run:

Team	Location	Colours
Argideen Rangers	Timoleague	Maroon and white
Ballygarvan	Ballygarvan	Red and white
Ballymartle	Riverstick	Green and yellow
Barryroe	Barryroe	Blue and navy
Castlemartyr	Castlemartyr	Red and white
Dripsey	Dripsey	Blue and red
Grenagh	Grenagh	Yellow and blue
Kilbrittain	Kilbrittain	Black and yellow
Milford	Milford	Blue and white
Lisgoold	Lisgoold	Blue and yellow
Russell Rovers	Shanagarry	Black and yellow
St. Catherine's	Ballynoe	Purple and yellow
St. Finbarr's	Togher	Blue and yellow
Tracton	Minane Bridge	Green and red

== Sponsorship ==
Co-Op Superstores were unveiled as the title sponsor for all of Cork GAA's hurling championships in July 2020 and provided sponsorship until the discontinuation of the championship in 2022.

== Managers ==
Managers in the Cork LIHC were involved in the day-to-day running of the team, including the training, team selection, and sourcing of players. Their influence varied from club-to-club and is related to the individual club committees. The manager was assisted by a team of two or three selectors and a backroom team consisting of various coaches.

Winning managers
Manager	Team	Wins	Winning years
Séamus Lawton	Castlemartyr	1	2020
Mossie O'Connell	Lisgoold	1	2021

== List of Finals ==
Year	Winners		Runners-up		Winning Captain(s)	Venue
Year	Club	Score	Club	Score	Winning Captain(s)	Venue
2021	Lisgoold	2-19	Kilbrittain	0-14	John Cronin	Páirc Uí Rinn
2020	Castlemartyr	1-20	Russell Rovers	0-11	Brian Lawton	Páirc Uí Rinn

== Roll of honour ==
#	Team	Wins	Runners-up	Winning Years	Years Runners-up
1	Castlemartyr	1	0	2020	-
1	Lisgoold	1	0	2021	-
3	Russell Rovers	0	1	-	2020
3	Kilbrittain	0	1	-	2021
