= Liam Abernethy =

Irish hurler (1929–1980)

Personal information
- Native name: Liam (Irish)
- Nickname: Billy
- Born: 1929 Castlemartyr, County Cork, Ireland
- Died: 21 October 1980 (aged 51) Cork, Ireland
- Occupation: Roman Catholic priest
- Height: 5 ft 8 in (173 cm)

Sport
- Sport: Hurling
- Position: Right corner-forward
Club
- Years: Club
- Castlemartyr
Club titles
- Cork titles: 0
Inter-county*
Years	County	Apps (scores)
1951-1952	Cork	1 (0-00)
Inter-county titles
- Munster titles: 0
- All-Irelands: 1
- NHL: 0
- *Inter County team apps and scores correct as of 21:10, 24 February 2013.

William J. Abernethy (1929 – 21 October 1980) was an Irish hurler who played as a right corner-forward for the Cork senior team.

Abernethy made his first appearance for the team during the 1951-52 National Hurling League and was a sometimes regular member of the starting fifteen until he left the panel after the 1952 championship. During that time he won one All-Ireland medal on the field of play and one Munster medal as a non-playing substitute.

At club level Abernethy was a one-time county junior championship medalist with Castlemartyr.

== Playing career ==
=== Club ===
Abernethy played his club hurling with Castlemartyr.

In 1951 Castlemartyr captured their second divisional junior title in succession. Having failed in the county series the previous year, Abernethy's side subsequently qualified for the county championship decider. A 6-5 to 2-7 defeat of Cloughduv gave Abernethy a junior championship medal.

=== Inter-county ===
Abernethy first came to prominence on the inter-county scene as a member of the Cork minor hurling team. He played in the underage grade for two seasons in 1946 and 1947, however, Cork exited the championship in both years without any success.

In 1952 Abernethy joined the Cork senior team for the championship. He was an unused some for Cork's opening three championship games but was included on the starting fifteen for the All-Ireland showdown with Dublin. Dublin were outclassed by Cork on that occasion. In spite of only leading by three points at half-time Cork won by 2-14 to 0-7 and Abernethy picked up an All-Ireland medal. His inter-county career ended shortly afterwards.
