= Liam Dowling =

Irish hurler (1931–1996)

Personal information
- Native name: Liam Ó Dualaing (Irish)
- Born: January 25, 1931 Castlemartyr, County Cork, Ireland
- Died: November 20, 1996 (aged 65) Cork, Ireland
- Height: 6 ft 2 in (188 cm)

Sport
- Sport: Hurling
- Position: Full-forward
Clubs
- Years: Club
- 1940s-1950s 1950s-1960s 1960s: Castlemartyr; Sarsfields; Castlemartyr
Club titles
- Cork titles: 1
Inter-county
Years	County	Apps (scores)
1952-1962	Cork	11 (9-05)
Inter-county titles
- Munster titles: 2
- All-Irelands: 2
- NHL: 1

Liam Dowling (25 January 1931 – 20 November 1996) was an Irish former hurler who played as a full-forward for the Cork senior team.

Dowling made his first appearance for the team during the 1952 championship and was a regular member of the starting fifteen at various intervals for much of the next decade. During that time he won two All-Ireland medals, two Munster medals and one National Hurling League medal.

At club level Dowling is a county senior championship medalist with Sarsfields. He also played with Castlemartyr.

== Playing career ==
=== Club ===
Dowling began his club hurling career with his local Castlemartyr club.

In 1951 he won his first county junior championship with the club following a 6-5 to 2-7 defeat of Cloughduv.

Dowling won further divisional titles with the club before moving to the Sarsfields club in the mid-fifties. 'Sars' secured the county senior championship in 1957.

The 1960s saw Dowling switch his club allegiance back to Castlemartyr once again. He won a second county junior championship with the club in 1964, as Cloughduv were accounted for once again.

=== Inter-county ===
Dowling first came to prominence with the Cork senior hurlers in the early 1950s. He won his first Munster title as a full-forward in 1952. Dowling later collected his first All-Ireland medal following a victory over Dublin in the championship decider. Cork continued their winning ways in 1953 with Dowling adding a National Hurling League medal to his collection. He later collected his second Munster title before later winning a second All-Ireland medal, following Cork’s defeat of Galway in one of the dirtiest All-Ireland finals ever.
