= The Rival Chiefs =

Gothic novel by Anna Millikin

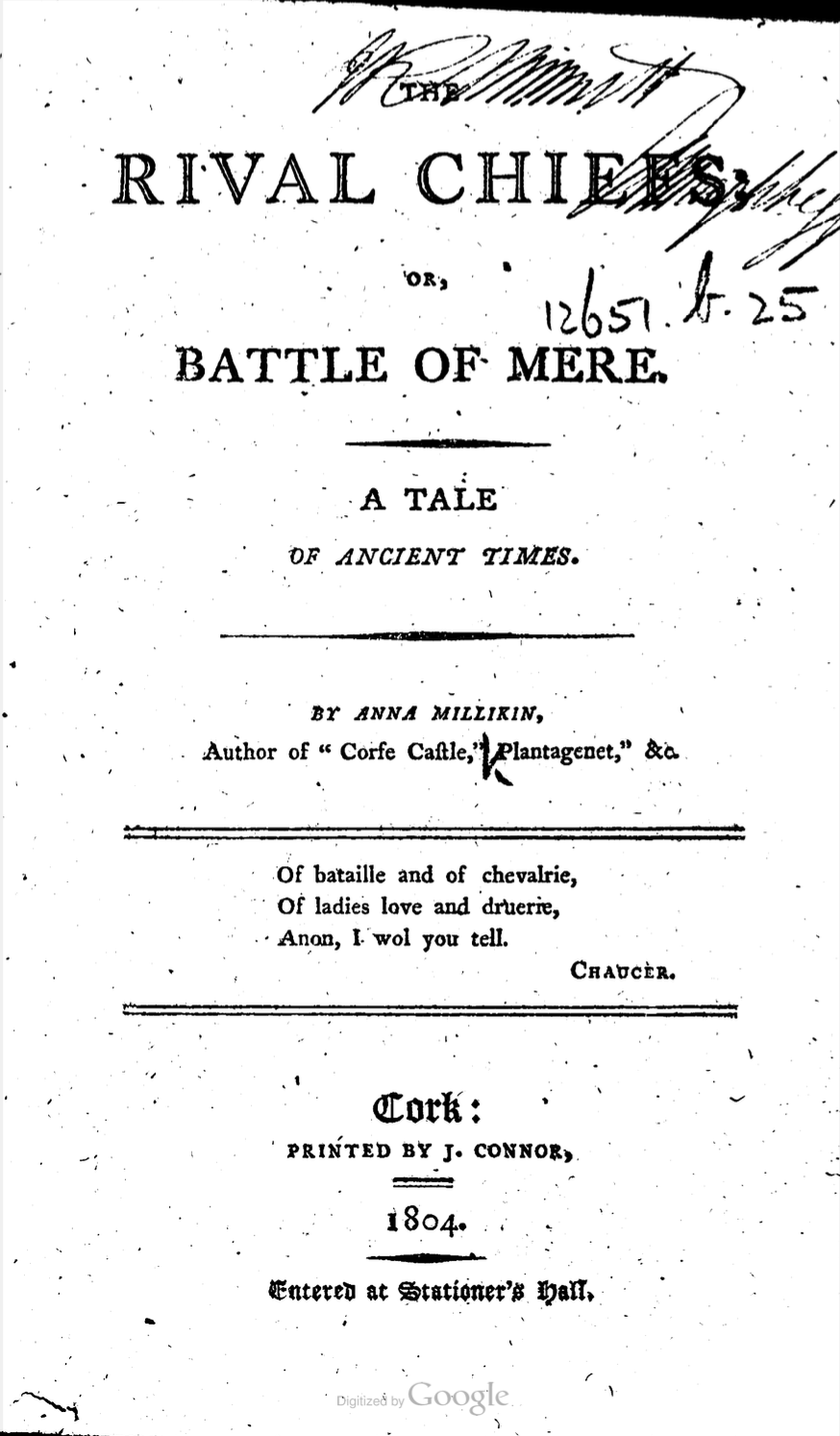
- Author: Anna Millikin
- Publication date: 1804

The Rival Chiefs; Or, Battle of Mere (1804) is a historical Gothic novel by Anna Millikin.

The story takes place in a chronologically vague setting at some point during the heptarchy of Anglo-Saxon England. The "mere" of the title is an archaic term for a border zone, in this case one characterized by frequent conflict. The rival chiefs are Ofred, who is King of Northumbria, and Kenred, heir to the throne of Mercia. Both fall in love with Cuthberga, a Mercian noblewoman; she only falls in love with Kenred. Cuthberga is sent to a remote castle, where both Ofred (disguised as a hunter) and Kenred (disguised as a peasant) secretly visit her. Ofred foils Kenred and Cuthberga's plans to marry, then defeats Kenred in a battle between Mercia and Northumberland. As a condition for peace, Ofred demands that Cuthberga marry him; she becomes Queen of Northumberland, unhappily. Kenred marries his originally-intended spouse Princess Avice of Mercia, (Note: Princess Avice is the daughter of the current King of Mercia, but Kenred (the king's heir) is not her brother. The king's three sons all die at the start of the novel, and Kenred is a distant kinsman who becomes his heir through male-line primogeniture.) who has a child and dies. Kenred inherits the throne of Mercia, and he and Ofred go to war again. In single combat, Kenred kills Ofred, who makes Cuthberga swear not to marry Kenred. The story ends with Cuthberga entering a convent.

The novel was first published in Cork, Ireland by John Connor in 1804, then reprinted in London by William Lane in March 1805 for Lane's Minerva Press. The Irish publishing industry was substantially reduced after an 1801 change in copyright law ended Irish unauthorized reprints; Connor's printing of Millikin's book was an outlier in 1804. Rival Chiefs was one of two novels that Millikin published in Ireland with Connor and then imported to London via the Minerva Press. Millikin was one of several authors who used the Minerva Press – a prolific publisher of commercial fiction for circulating libraries, particularly associated with both women writers and women readers – to gain an international audience for their Irish novels.

An 1805 review in The Literary Journal was highly negative, stating: "The whole is judiciously confined to one small volume, as the story is sufficiently heavy and uninteresting. It is really amazing how it is possible to sit down to a work of imagination, and write matter so stale, flat, and unprofitable."
