= Denis O'Riordan Cup =

Annual hurling competition

- Current season or competition: 2025 Denis O'Riordan Cup
- Irish: Corn Donncha Ó Riordáin
- Code: Hurling
- Founded: 2022; 3 years ago
- Region: Cork (GAA)
- Trophy: Denis O'Riordan Cup
- No. of teams: 6
- Title holders: Imokilly (4th title)
- Most titles: Imokilly (4 titles)
- Sponsors: Co-Op Superstores
- Official website: Cork GAA

The Denis O'Riordan Cup is an annual hurling competition organised by the Cork County Board of the Gaelic Athletic Association and contested by divisional and university sides in the county of Cork in Ireland, deciding the competition winners through a group stage and knockout format.

Imokilly are the reigning champions, having beaten Muskerry by 1–23 to 0–15 in the 2025 final.

== History ==
A restructuring process of the entire Cork hurling championship system had been underway since voted on by Cork County Board delegates in March 2019. From 2020, the participating divisions and colleges held their own series of games, designed to produce one team to advance to the quarter-final stages of the championship proper. In 2022, it was decided to award the Denis O'Riordan Cup to the winning team.

== Qualification for subsequent competitions ==
The Denis O'Riordan Cup winners qualify for the quarter-final stage of the Cork Premier Senior Hurling Championship.

== Trophy ==
The winning team is presented with the Denis O'Riordan Cup. Denis O'Riordan was the Valley Rovers delegate to the south-east board for 12 years before becoming treasurer. He later became county board delegate and served for 32 years.

== List of finals ==
Year	Winners		Runners-up		Winning captains(s)	Venue	#
Year	Club	Score	Club	Score	Winning captains(s)	Venue	#
2022	Imokilly	3-29	Avondhu	1-21	Brian Lawton	Páirc Uí Rinn	
2023	Imokilly	0-25	Avondhu	0-20	John Cronin; Ciarán O'Brien	Páirc Uí Rinn	
2024	Imokilly	6-31	Muskerry	0-17	Ciarán O'Brien	Páirc Uí Rinn	
2025	Imokilly	1-23	Muskerry	0-15	Brian Lawton	Páirc Uí Rinn	
