= Anna Millikin =

Teacher and author

- Born: County Cork
- Occupation: Writer
- Writing career
- Period: 1764-1849
- Genres: Gothic and historical novels

Anna Millikin (19 January 1764 – at least 1849) was a teacher and author of the late 18th and early 19th centuries. She was one of the earliest Irish women to write Gothic novels. She also established the literary periodical the Casket or Hesperian Magazine.

== Early years ==
Millikin was born at Castlemartyr, County Cork from an originally Quaker family. She was the daughter of Robert Millikin and Elizabeth Battaley. Her grandfather, Robert Millikin, was a Belfast linen merchant of Scottish descent. He moved to the Boyle estate at Castlemartyr. At that point, the family became members of the established church.

== Career ==
Millikin was one of the earliest women writers of Gothic fiction. She wrote at least four books. She also founded and contributed to the literary periodical the Casket or Hesperian Magazine (Cork, 1797–98) with her brother Richard Alfred Milliken (1767-1815) who was a poet. Her subscribers of her novels included Lord Boyle, Countess Shannon, Lady Harriet Bernard of Bandon, and the Freke family.

The Critical Review of January 1803 reviewed her Plantagenet novel as follows:

In these two volumes of Mrs. Millikin, are contained the marriage of William, son to Robert duke of Normandy, with a daughter of the duke of Anjou; preceded by a secret memoir of the ill treatment of the lady’s father to his rightful duchess. It will not be expected that the author has followed facts in a novel; but the work has, however, enough of the appearance of probability to make it interesting.

She was still alive in May 1849, when she made a successful application to the Royal Literary Fund.

== Selected works ==
- Corfe Castle, or, Historic tracts : a novel (1793)
- Eva, an old Irish story. : By the authoress of Corfe Castle (1795)
- Plantagenet; or Secrets of the House of Anjou. : A tale of the twelfth century. Vol. I-II (1802)
- The Rival Chiefs; Or, Battle of Mere (1804)
- An epitome of ancient history : designed for the use of her pupils (1808)
