= 2020 Cork Lower Intermediate Hurling Championship =

- Dates: 1 August 2020 - 21 August 2021
- Teams: 12
- Sponsor: Co-Op Superstores
- Champions: Castlemartyr (1st title); Brian Lawton (captain); Séamus Lawton (manager)
- Runners-up: Russell Rovers; Daniel Moynihan (captain); Séamus Kennefick (manager)
- Relegated: Ballymartle

Tournament statistics
- Matches played: 24
- Goals scored: 59 (2.46 per match)
- Points scored: 719 (29.96 per match)
- Top scorer(s): Josh Beausang (3-50)

The 2020 Cork Lower Intermediate Hurling Championship was the inaugural staging of the Cork Lower Intermediate Hurling Championship since its establishment by the Cork County Board. The draw for the group stage placings took place on 19 November 2019. The championship was scheduled to begin in April 2020, however, it was postponed indefinitely due to the coronavirus pandemic in Ireland. The championship eventually began on 1 August 2020 and, after being suspended once again on 5 October 2020, eventually ended on 21 August 2021.

The final was played on 21 August 2021 at Páirc Uí Rinn in Cork, between Castlemartry and Russell Rovers, in their first ever meeting in a county final in any grade. Castlemartyr won the match by 1-20 to 0-11 to claim the inaugural title.

Castlemartyr's Josh Beausang was the championship's top scorer with 3-50.

== Team changes ==
=== To Championship ===
Regraded from the Cork Intermediate Hurling Championship

- Kilbrittain
- Tracton
- St Finbarrs
- Castlemartyr
- St Catherine’s
- Barryroe
- Ballymartle
- Grenagh
- Ballygarvan
- Milford
- Dripsey

Promoted from the Cork Junior A Hurling Championship

- Russell Rovers

== Participating teams ==
The club rankings were based on a championship performance 'points' system over the previous four seasons.

| Team | Seeding | Ranking | Location | Colours |
|---|---|---|---|---|
| Kilbrittain | A | 1 | Kilbrittain | Black and yellow |
| Tracton | A | 2 | Minane Bridge | Green and red |
| Castlemartyr | A | 3 | Castlemartyr | Red and white |
| St. Finbarr's | B | 4 | Togher | Blue and yellow |
| Barryroe | B | 5 | Barryroe | Blue and navy |
| St. Catherine's | B | 6 | Ballynoe | Purple and yellow |
| Grenagh | C | 7 | Grenagh | Yellow and blue |
| Ballymartle | C | 8 | Riverstick | Green and yellow |
| Ballygarvan | C | 9 | Ballygarvan | Red and white |
| Milford | D | 10 | Milford | Blue and white |
| Dripsey | D | 11 | Dripsey | Blue and red |
| Russell Rovers | D | 12 | Shanagarry | Black and yellow |

== Fixtures/results ==
=== Group 1 ===
==== Table ====
Advance to knockout stage Advance to relegation play-offs

| Team | Matches | | | | Score | | | Pts |
| Team | Pld | W | D | L | For | Against | Diff | Pts |
|---|---|---|---|---|---|---|---|---|
| Russell Rovers | 3 | 1 | 2 | 0 | 10-46 | 3-40 | 27 | 4 |
| Kilbrittain | 3 | 1 | 2 | 0 | 2-45 | 1-36 | 12 | 4 |
| Ballygarvan | 3 | 1 | 1 | 1 | 1-42 | 3-46 | -10 | 3 |
| Barryroe | 3 | 0 | 1 | 2 | 3-34 | 9-45 | -29 | 1 |

==== Results ====
| 1 August 2020 Round 1 | Ballygarvan | 0-17 - 1-14 | Russell Rovers | Riverstown Sportsfield |
| | M Kennefick 0-5 (2f), M Cussen 0-4 (3f), D O’Connor and R O’Halloran 0-2 each, D McCarthy 0-1 (1f), D O’Sullivan, P O’Halloran and A Dunne 0-1 each. | Report | J Beausang 1-9 (1 pen, 7f), K Tattan, P Cummins, L Duggan, D Moynihan and B Hartnett 0-1 each. |

| 2 August 2020 Round 1 | Kilbrittain | 0-12 - 0-12 | Barryroe | Timoleague Sportsfield |
| | M Sexton 0-8 (7f); C Sheehan, P Wall, M Hickey, R Cashman (f) 0-1 each. | Report | J Murphy 0-8 (8f); R Kiely, P Moloney, S Holland, B O’Donovan (f) 0-1 each. | Referee: M Collins (Clonakilty) |

| 9 August 2020 Round 2 | Barryroe | 2-10 - 1-15 | Ballygarvan | Páirc Uí Riagáin |
| | J Murphy 1-7, A McSweeney 1-0, K Griffin 0-1, R Kiely 0-1, B O'Donovan 0-1. | | D O'Connor 1-4, R O'Halloran 0-4, M Kennefick 0-4, M Cussen 0-2, C O'Leary 0-1. |

| 9 August 2020 Round 2 | Kilbrittain | 2-11 - 1-14 | Russell Rovers | Carrigaline Sportsfield |
| | M Sexton 0-7, P Wall 1-1, M Madden 1-0, C Sheehan 0-1, R Cashman 0-1, S Sexton 0-1. | | J Beausang 0-8, N Hartnett 1-2, K Tatton 0-1, J McGrath 0-1, L Murray 0-1, P Cummins 0-1. |

| 30 August 2020 Round 3 | Barryroe | 1-12 - 8-18 | Russell Rovers | Manning Park |
| | J O'Donovan 0-8, R Kiely 1-1, M Crowley 0-1, A McSweeney 0-1, D Buckley 0-1. | | J Beausang 2-9, D Ruddy 2-2, B Hartnett 2-1, L Duggan-Murray 1-1, K Moynihan 0-4, J McGrath 1-0, JP Ivers 0-1. |

| 30 August 2020 Round 3 | Kilbrittain | 0-22 - 0-10 | Ballygarvan | Charlie Hurley Park |
| | M Sexton 0-12, M Madden 0-3, P Wall 0-2, R Cashman 0-2, P Brennan 0-1, T Harrington 0-1, M Hickey 0-1. | | M Kennefick 0-9, A Buckley 0-1. |

=== Group 2 ===
==== Table ====
Advance to knockout stage Advance to relegation play-offs

| Team | Matches | | | | Score | | | Pts |
| Team | Pld | W | D | L | For | Against | Diff | Pts |
|---|---|---|---|---|---|---|---|---|
| Castlemartyr | 3 | 3 | 0 | 0 | 9-63 | 5-34 | 41 | 6 |
| Milford | 3 | 1 | 1 | 1 | 4-50 | 3-44 | 9 | 3 |
| St. Finbarr's | 3 | 1 | 1 | 1 | 3-49 | 4-33 | 3 | 3 |
| Ballymartle | 3 | 0 | 0 | 3 | 1-31 | 5-72 | -53 | 0 |

==== Results ====
| 2 August 2020 Round 1 | Castlemartyr | 3-13 - 2-13 | St. Finbarr's | Riverstown Sportsfield |
| | | Report |

| 2 August 2020 Round 1 | Ballymartle | 1-08 - 0-22 | Milford | Carrignavar Sportsfield |
| | | Report |

| 9 August 2020 Round 2 | Castlemartyr | 1-22 - 3-14 | Milford | Mourne Abbey |
| | M Kelly 0-6. | Report |

| 9 August 2020 Round 2 | St. Finbarr's | 0-22 - 0-16 | Ballymartle | Ballinhassig Sportsfield |
| | | Report |

| 30 August 2020 Round 3 | Castlemartyr | 5-28 - 0-07 | Ballymartle | Rostellan Sportsfield |
| | M Kelly 1-9, B Lawton 1-3. | Report |

| 30 August 2020 Round 3 | St. Finbarr's | 1-14 - 1-14 | Milford | Castletownroche Sportsfield |
| | | Report |

=== Group 3 ===
==== Table ====
Advance to knockout stage

| Team | Matches | | | | Score | | | Pts |
| Team | Pld | W | D | L | For | Against | Diff | Pts |
|---|---|---|---|---|---|---|---|---|
| St. Catherine's | 3 | 3 | 0 | 0 | 2-47 | 1-37 | 13 | 6 |
| Tracton | 3 | 2 | 0 | 1 | 6-53 | 5-40 | 16 | 4 |
| Dripsey | 3 | 0 | 1 | 2 | 4-41 | 3-58 | -14 | 1 |
| Grenagh | 3 | 0 | 1 | 2 | 3-38 | 6-44 | -15 | 1 |

==== Results ====
| 1 August 2020 Round 1 | Grenagh | 1-14 - 0-17 | Dripsey | Páirc Eoin Mhic Charthaigh |

| 1 August 2020 Round 1 | Tracton | 0-14 - 0-15 | St Catherine's | Páirc Shéamuis de Barra |

| 9 August 2020 Round 2 | Tracton | 1-24 - 3-12 | Dripsey | Manning Park |
| | R Walsh 0-10. | Report |

| 9 August 2020 Round 2 | St Catherine's | 1-15 - 0-11 | Grenagh | Páirc Bhríde |
| | | Report |

| 30 August 2020 Round 3 | St Catherine's | 1-17 - 1-12 | Dripsey | Felix Sarsfield Memorial Park |
| | | Report |

| 30 August 2020 Round 3 | Tracton | 5-12 - 2-13 | Grenagh | Páirc Uí Chonchúir |
| | R Walsh 0-7. | Report | S Bourke 1-8, S Cronin 1-1. |

=== Knockout stage ===
==== Relegation playoff ====
| 12 September 2020 Playoff | Barryroe | 4-36 - 0-05 | Ballymartle | Charlie Hurley Park |
| | J O'Donovan 1-8, D Ó Buachalla 1-5, J Murphy 0-8, C Hurley 1-3, R Kiely 1-2, A McSweeney 0-3, K Griffin 0-3, M Crowley 0-2, C Sheehy 0-1, D O'Driscoll 0-1. | | D O'Leary 0-4, B Dwyer 0-1. |

==== Quarter-finals ====
| 12 September 2020 Quarter-final | Russell Rovers | 2-18 - 1-13 | Milford | Páirc Mac Gearailt |
| | J Beausang 0-10 (0-6 f), B Hartnett 2-1, K Moynihan 0-3, K Walsh 0-2, L Duggan-Murray, J Scannell 0-1 each. | Report | A Watson 0-5, B Murphy 0-4 f, E Dillon 0-3 f, S O'Connell 1-0, C O'Gorman 0-1 f. | Referee: P Lyons (Bishopstown) |

| 12 September 2020 Quarter-final | Kilbrittain | 1-16 - 0-08 | Tracton | Brinny Sportsfield |
| | M Sexton 0-8, D Harrington 1-1, P Wall 0-2, M Hickey 0-2, R Cashman 0-1, M Madden 0-1, C Sheehan 0-1. | | R Walsh 0-6, A Kiely 0-1, M Byrne 0-1. |

==== Semi-finals ====
| 26 September 2020 Semi-final | St Catherine’s | 0-13 - 1-15 | Russell Rovers | Killeagh Grounds |
| | S O’Brien 0-8 (0-6f,65), M Mulcahy 0-3, B Mulcahy, D Mangan (0-1 each). | Report | J Beausang 0-10 (0-6f, 65), B Hartnett 1-0, L Duggan-Murray 0-2, J McGrath 0-2, D Ruddy 0-1. |

| 27 September 2020 Semi-final | Castlemartyr | 1-13 - 0-13 | Kilbrittain | Páirc Uí Rinn |
| | M Kelly (1-3, 2 frees), Barry Lawton (0-4, 1 ’65), N Madden (0-3), Brian Lawton, E Martin, J McGann (0-1 each). | Report | M Sexton (0-5 frees), R Cashman (0-2, 1 free), P Brennan, M Hickey, P Wall, M Madden, C Moloney and D Harrington (0-1 each). |

==== Final ====
| 21 August 2021 Final | Russell Rovers | 0-11 - 1-20 | Castlemartyr | Páirc Uí Rinn |
| | J Beausang (0-4, 3 frees), B Hartnett (1 free) and K Moynihan (0-2 each), P Cummins, L Duggan Murray and F Murray (0-1 each). | Report | M Kelly (0-9, 6 frees), J McGann (1-2), Barry Lawton (0-4), J Stack (0-2), N Madden, M Cosgrave and C Joyce (0-1 each). | Referee: D Kirwan (Éire Óg) |
