= Brian Lawton (hurler) =

Irish hurler

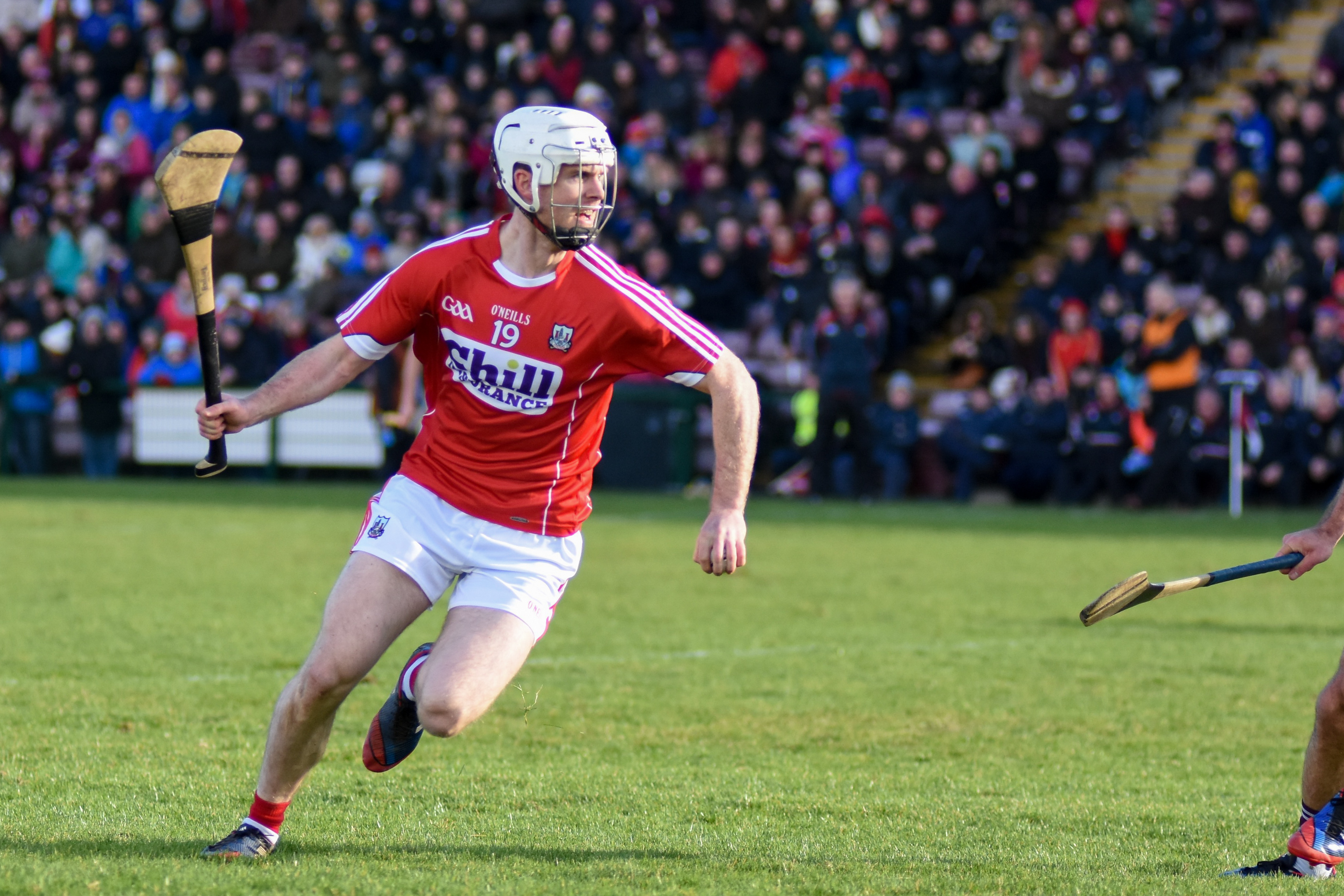
- Brian Lawton in 2016

Personal information
- Native name: Briain Ó Lachtnáin (Irish)
- Born: 9 December 1988 (age 37) Castlemartyr, County Cork, Ireland
- Occupation: Business analyst
- Height: 5 ft 11 in (180 cm)

Sport
- Sport: Hurling
- Position: Left wing-forward
Clubs
- Years: Club
- Castlemartyr; Imokilly
Club titles
- Cork titles: 1
College
- Years: College
- University College Cork
College titles
- Fitzgibbon titles: 1
Inter-county*
Years	County	Apps (scores)
2014-present	Cork	11 (0-05)
Inter-county titles
- Munster titles: 3
- All-Irelands: 0
- NHL: 0
- All Stars: 0
- *Inter County team apps and scores correct as of 12:40, 10 July 2015.

Brian Lawton (born 9 December 1988) is an Irish hurler who plays as a left wing-forward for club side Castlemartyr, divisional side Imokilly and at inter-county level with the Cork senior hurling team.

== Playing career ==
=== College ===
Lawton first came to prominence as a hurler with Midleton CBS Secondary School. Having played for various college team in every grade, he was at midfield on the senior team. On 12 March 2006, Lawton won a Harty Cup medal after a 2–08 to 0–12 defeat of St. Flannan's College.

=== University ===
During his studies at University College Cork, Lawton enjoyed success as a hurler, beginning with an All-Ireland Freshers Championship title in his first year. On 2 March 2013, he won a Fitzgibbon Cup medal after a 2–17 to 2–12 defeat of Mary Immaculate College in the final.

=== Club ===
Lawton joined the Castle martyr club at a young age and played in all grades at juvenile and underage levels. As a member of the club's top adult team, he won four East Cork Junior Championship medals in six seasons. On 26 October 2014, Lawton was at centre-forward when Castlemartyr won the Cork Junior Championship after an 0–18 to 0–10 defeat of Ballinhassig.

Lawton's performances for his club in the junior grade saw him added to the Imokilly team and he has been a regular member of the team for over a decade. On 22 October 2017, he lined out as right wing-forward in the senior championship final. Lawton scored two points, including a sideline, in Imokilly's 3–13 to 0–18 defeat of Blackrock.

=== Inter-county ===
==== Intermediate ====
Lawton first played for Cork at intermediate level and made his first appearance for the team on 31 May 2009 when he came on as a substitute against Tipperary. He later won a Munster medal as a non-playing substitute after a 5–24 to 3–09 defeat of Waterford in the final. On 29 August 2009, Lawton was an unused substitute when Cork defeated Kilkenny by 2–23 to 0–16 in the All-Ireland final. He won a second successive Munster medal in 2010, scoring a point after being introduced as a substitute in a second successive defeat of Watreford in the final. On 28 August 2010, Lawton was introduced as a substitute in the 53rd minute of Cork's All-Ireland final defeat by Kilkenny.

==== Senior ====
Lawton made his senior debut for Cork on 9 March 2014, replacing Conor Lehane in the 53rd minute of a National League game against Offaly at Páirc Uí Rinn. He made several appearances throughout the league and subsequent championship. On 13 July 2014, Lawton won his first Munster medal as an unused substitute after a six-point defeat of Limeric in the finalk.

On 9 July 2017, Lawton won his second Munster medal following a 1–25 to 1–20 defeat of Clare in the final.

On 1 July 2018, Lawton won a third Munster medal after a 2–24 to 3–19 defeat of Clare in the final.

== Career statistics ==
=== Club ===
As of match played 2 April 2018.

Team	Year	Championship	
Team	Year	Apps	Score
Imokilly	2008	3	0-03
Imokilly	2009	2	0-02
Imokilly	2010	3	0-00
Imokilly	2011	—	
Imokilly	2012	—	
University College Cork	2013	4	0-02
Imokilly	2014	1	0-00
Imokilly	2015	4	0-05
Imokilly	2016	3	0-06
Imokilly	2017	7	0-14
Imokilly	2018	2	0-03
Total		29	0-35

=== Inter-county ===
As of match played 1 July 2018.

Team	Year	National League			Munster		All-Ireland		Total	
Team	Year	Division	Apps	Score	Apps	Score	Apps	Score	Apps	Score
Cork	2014	Division 1B	4	0-01	2	0-00	0	0-00	6	0-01
Cork	2015	Division 1A	5	0-02	0	0-00	3	0-03	8	0-05
Cork	2016	Division 1A	6	0-07	1	0-01	2	0-01	9	0-09
Cork	2017	Division 1A	2	0-00	1	0-00	0	0-00	3	0-00
Cork	2018	Division 1A	4	0-00	2	0-00	0	0-00	6	0-00
Total			21	0-10	6	0-01	5	0-04	32	0-15

== Honours ==
Midleton CBS

- Harty Cup: 2006

University College Cork

- Fitzgibbon Cup: 2013
- All-Ireland Freshers' Hurling Championship: 2007

Castlemartyr

- Cork Lower Intermediate Hurling Championship: 2020 (c)
- Cork Junior Hurling Championship: 2014
- East Cork Junior A Hurling Championship: 2009, 2010, 2013, 2014

Imokilly

- Cork Senior Hurling Championship: 2017

Cork

- Munster Senior Hurling Championship: 2014, 2017, 2018
- All-Ireland Intermediate Hurling Championship: 2009
- Munster Intermediate Hurling Championship: 2009, 2010
