= Lisgoold GAA =

Gaelic games club in County Cork, Ireland

Lisgoold
- Liosgcúl
- Founded: 1887
- County: Cork
- Colours: Blue and Gold
- Grounds: Páirc LiosgCúl
- Coordinates: 51°58′40.048″N 8°12′56.588″W

Playing kits
Standard colours

Lisgoold GAA Club is a gaelic football, hurling and ladies football club based in the village of Lisgoold, County Cork, Ireland. The club draws its support from Leamlara, Ballincurrig, Peafield and Lisgoold itself. The club fields teams in Cork GAA and Imokilly GAA divisional competitions.

== History ==
The club was founded in 1887. From initial beginnings in the barrack field in Ballincurrig, through to the club's modern location in Páirc Lios gCúl in Lisgoold village, it has played a part in the promotion of Ireland's national games in the parish. In 1887, the club played in the first ever Cork Senior Football final, losing to Lees 0-4 to 0-1. Afterwards it vied in competition with Midleton GAA Club, continuously challenging for senior honours. By the early 1920s however the club had a decline in fortunes as due to mainly economic reasons, a lot of people in the Lisgoold parish moved to the parishes of Ballinacurra and Aghada. However the club survived and eventually the first adult title was claimed by the club as Captain Dan Joe McCarthy led the 1952 hurlers to the East Cork 'B' title against Watergrasshill. Further success for the club followed when their own Willie Moore played for the Cork senior hurling team. During his time with the Cork team, he won one All-Ireland winners' medal vs Wexford and one Munster winners' medal vs Tipperary. He won these two medals in the 1954 season.

In the decades that followed the 1950s, they captured their first football title in 1961 followed with another in 1964. The 1970s saw hurling titles gained in 1971 and 1977. The 1971 team lost out on the 'B' championship double as they lost to Youghal in the 1971 'B' football final. The club nearly made the 1981 East Cork 'A' hurling final but lost out to the eventual runners-up Dungourney in the semi-final. In 1983 they lost to St.Catherines in the earlier rounds of the East Cork 'A' hurling Championship. The 'Saints' who would go on to win the 1983 Cork Junior A hurling title that season, but Lisgoold had the consolation of winning the 1983 'B' Football championship later on in the year.

The club went into a slow decline, but come the 1990s the club flourished when it established its Juvenile section in 1991. In 1994, the junior hurlers won the club's first adult county title winning the Cork Junior B Hurling final beating Buttevant. This coupled with winning their fourth East Cork Junior 'B' hurling title a month later beating Sarsfields. The official opening took place of Páirc Lios gCúl seven months later when it was officially open by then GAA President Jack Boothman. Following this, several Juvenile and Adult titles came to the club. This included the club's first underage county title which was a Cork county minor hurling league title in 2003, a Cork County U-16 hurling Championship in 2007, their second Cork Junior B hurling title in 2008, a first Under-21 title (after losing six finals) with victory coming against Cobh in the 2009 East Cork Final, an All-Ireland hurling sevens title and an East Cork Division One football title which were both captured in 2014. The latter was the first time the club collected an 'A' grade title.

Also the club has seen several of its players representing the club at Cork level in both codes. For the 2019 season, the first adult team was competing at Junior A level hurling and football in the Imokilly (East Cork) division.

== Club development ==
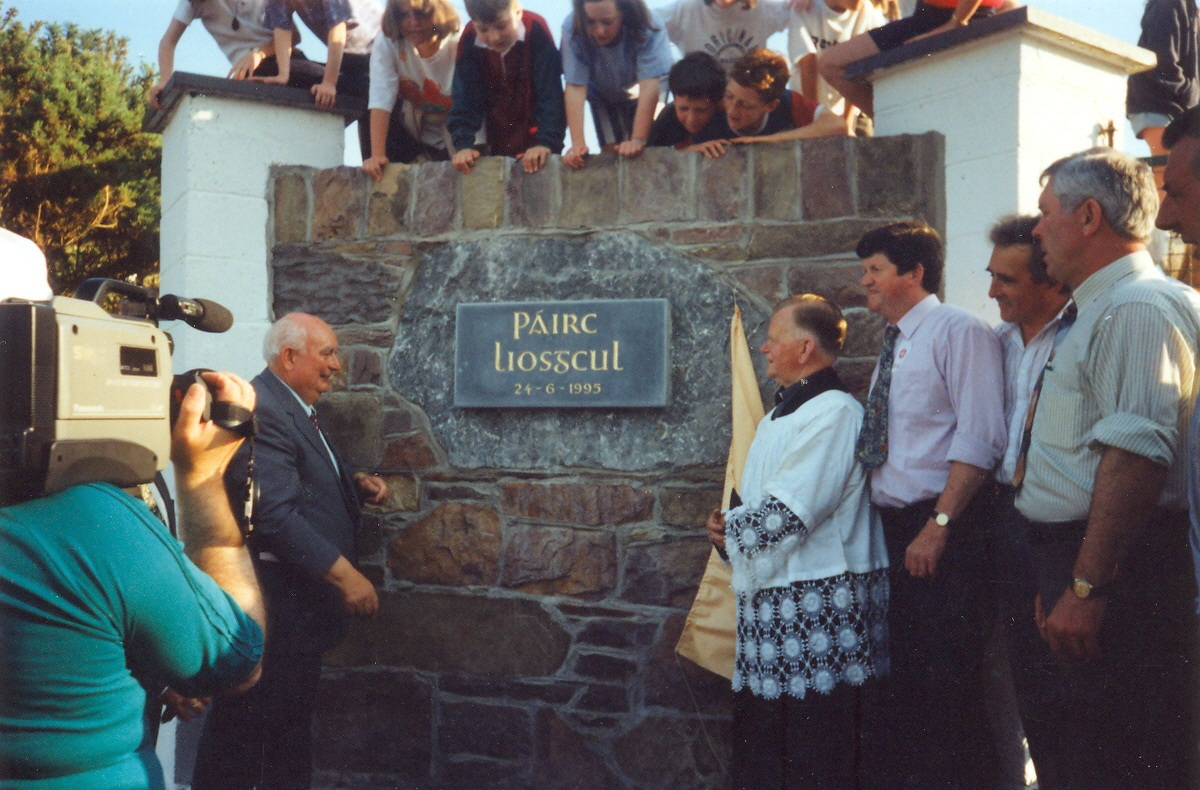
Opening of Páirc Liosgcul by GAA President Jack Boothman June 1995

After many years of playing in fields around the parish, the club decided to build a home of its own. In 1975, a field committee was set up to provide the club with a hurling and football pitch. They bought seven acres in 1977 for £7,000 following fundraising activities. The official opening took place on 24 June 1995 when it was officially opened by then GAA President Jack Boothman. A second smaller pitch for training and juvenile matches was opened in 1999. In recent years the club has sought to expand their grounds further. In 2004, they completed the construction of an outdoor Ball Alley as well as floodlights for the second smaller pitch. In 2016 the club has completed a new clubhouse building fitted with two new dressing rooms, a referees room, a gym, a meeting room and toilet facilities. They also have refurbished and expanded their old dressing rooms and, in 2019, constructed an AstroTurf pitch.

== Key seasons ==
=== 1887 Senior County Football Final ===
Lisgoold was involved in the first draw of the Cork County Championships. The club at that time decided to enter the football competition. On 30 January 1887, the following draws were made for the first County Championships:

Football Draw

- Emmets v Lees
- Carrignavar v Glanmire
- Lisgoold v Midleton
- Blarney bye

The first County Championship game took place on 6 March at Cork Park, a scoreless draw between Emmetts and Lees in the football championship. Lees won the replay and went on to contest the final against Lisgoold, who took three games to overcome neighbours Midleton. The score in the County Final was Lees two points, two forfeit points to Lisgoold’s one point.

Teams were as follows:

Lees: W Daly (Capt), MJ Shortall, BD O’Connor, R Seward, D Lyons, T Lucy, C Walsh, E Hanna, J Breslin, W Douglas, P McCarthy, PM Nunan, F O’Keeffe, J O’Sullivan, J O’Callaghan, J Thornhill, M Hasset, M Higgins, W Barret, W Donovan, A Collins.

Lisgoold: W Ring (Capt), C Ryan, P Tattan, T Mackey, L Cullinane, D Ward, Jas Fitzgerald, J Fitzgerald, T Meara, T Clancy, M Riordan, C Kenny, M Dillon, J Barry, J Ward, W Casey, J Casey, M Morrison, J O’Keeffe, T Riordan, T Leary.

Referee: W Sheehan, Carrignavar.

=== 1994 Double Winning Season ===
Summary:

1994 was the year the club won their first adult county title. Following a slow-start to the season, they produced a 10-game unbeaten run in the championship (16 if including friendlies) to land three trophies that were available to them that season. They secured the East Cork County section title in August 1994, beating Carrignavar. This kicked off a county campaign which ended on 23 October 1994, where the Lisgoold junior hurlers capturing the club's first adult county title by beating Buttevant in the Cork Junior B hurling Final in Páirc Uí Chaoimh on a score-line of 3-6 to 1-11. A month later they added the East Cork Junior B Championship by beating Sarsfields 1-9 to 0-8 in the final. This cemented their promotion to the East Cork 'A' grade championship where they stayed competing until the club re-graded to 'B' grade in December 1999 for the 2000 season.

1994 Season:

1994 East Cork Junior B Hurling Championship

- First Round Due to the number of teams in championship Lisgoold were one of the teams given a bye to the second round.
- Second Round Lisgoold 3-18 to 0-7 Youghal
- Quarter-Final Lisgoold 3-9 to 0-7 Watergrasshill
- Semi-Final: Lisgoold 2-8 to 2-6 Carrigtwohill
- East Cork Final: Lisgoold 1-9 to 0-8 Sarsfields

1994 East Cork Junior B County Section Hurling Championship

- Quarter-Final Lisgoold 4-13 to 1-1 Ballinacurra
- Semi-Final: Lisgoold 2-14 to 0-4 Russell Rovers
- East Cork Final: Lisgoold 4-5 to 0-9 Carrignavar

Cork County Junior B Hurling Championship:

- Quarter-Final Lisgoold 1-13 to 2-9 Shandon Rovers
- Semi-Final: Lisgoold 3-9 to 0-5 Crosshaven
- Cork County Final: Lisgoold 3-6 v 1-11 Buttevant

Panel: Liam Walsh, Jerry Ryan, Martin T. Hickey, Timmy McAuliffe, Matt Murphy, Mike Woods, Tom Gentleman, Ollie Williams, Ned O'Keeffe, Tom Nagle, Declan O'Shea, Sean O'Shea, Donie Murphy (Captain.) Pete O'Keffee, Brian Woods, Joe Ryan, Willie O'Keeffe, Mike Barry, Liam Hickey, Seamus Fleming, Denis McCarthy, Eugene Hegarty, Michael Mulcahy, Seamus McSweeney, Declan Whelan, Liam Sheehan.

Scorers (in County final vs Buttevant): B.Woods 2-1 T.McCaulliffe 1-1, T.Gentleman 0-3, Donie Murphy 0-1.

=== 2007 Club's Revival ===
Junior Season Summary:

The 2007 season was a significant year where the footballers won the East Cork 'B' Championship for the first time since 1983. A very poor run of form meant a poor start to the season where they would finish eventually fourth in the division two league. They lost the East Cork County section title in April 2008, to Russell Rovers. However they bounced back producing a title winning run, landing the East Cork Junior B Championship beating Carrigtwohill in the final in Dungourney. This meant they were playing 'A' grade championship for the first time since 1999, and in football for the first time since 1985.

2007 Junior Season:

2007 East Cork Junior B County Section Football Championship

- Semi-Final: Due to the number of teams in championship Lisgoold were given a bye to the final.
- East Cork Final: Lisgoold 1-6 to 1-8 Russell Rovers

2007 East Cork Junior B Football Championship

- First Round Lisgoold 3-6 to 1-1 Midleton
- Quarter-Final Lisgoold 0-11 to 1-4 Cloyne
- Semi-Final: Lisgoold 3-11 to 2-11 Ballinacurra
- East Cork Final: Lisgoold 1-11 to 3-2 Carrigtwohill

2007 Junior Football Panel: Ciaran Cronin, Michael Beirne, Kevin O'Shea, Mike O'Shea, Patrick O'Mahony, Kevin O'Loughin, Owen Hegarty, Barry Ahern, Charles Smart, Tomas Coleman, Paul Stack, Paul O'Brien, John Paul O'Brien, Denis Murphy, Tim Mulcahy, Denis O'Brien, Maurice Mulcahy, Noel Connery, Donal O'Leary, Finbarr Brosnan, Maurice O'Connell, Jer O'Connell, Wayne Kingston, Liam Foley, Jamie Woods, Alan Conroy, Patrick Connery, Noel O'Riordan, Darren Stack, Dave O'Sullivan, Mike O'Riordan, Patrick Connery.

Scorers (in East Cork final vs Carrigtwohill): Jer O'Connell 0-5, Ciaran Cronin 1-1, Kevin O'Shea 0-3, Charles Smart, Barry Ahern 0-1 each.

=== 2008 Return to 'A' Grade ===
Summary:

After the 2007 season where the footballers won the East Cork 'B' Championship after a 24-year gap, and were now promoted to 'A' grade for 2008, this coupled with the Under-16's Hurlers winning county championship run in the same year, the 2008 season promised to be a great one for the junior hurlers. Promotion to division two in the East Cork league was achieved in May, which set them up for championship season. Like the 1994 squad they strung together a run of victories. They produced a 9-game unbeaten run in championship (16 if including friendlies) to land three trophies that were available to them that season. They secured the East Cork County section title in July 2008, beating Ballinacurra. On 23 August 2008, the Lisgoold junior hurlers captured the club's second adult county title by beating St Mary's in the Cork junior B hurling Final in Páirc Uí Rinn on a score-line of 2-19 to 1-7. A month later, they added the East Cork Junior B Championship by beating St.Catherines 2-18 to 1-9 in the final. Around this time a new Munster and All-Ireland competition was organised for Junior 'B' level, this meant Lisgoold faced St Brendan's of (Kerry) in the Munster Quarter-final. They succeeded in this encounter but succumbed at the semi-final stage to Bruree of (Limerick). However they were now back competing at Junior 'A' Grade level in hurling and football for the first time since 1985.

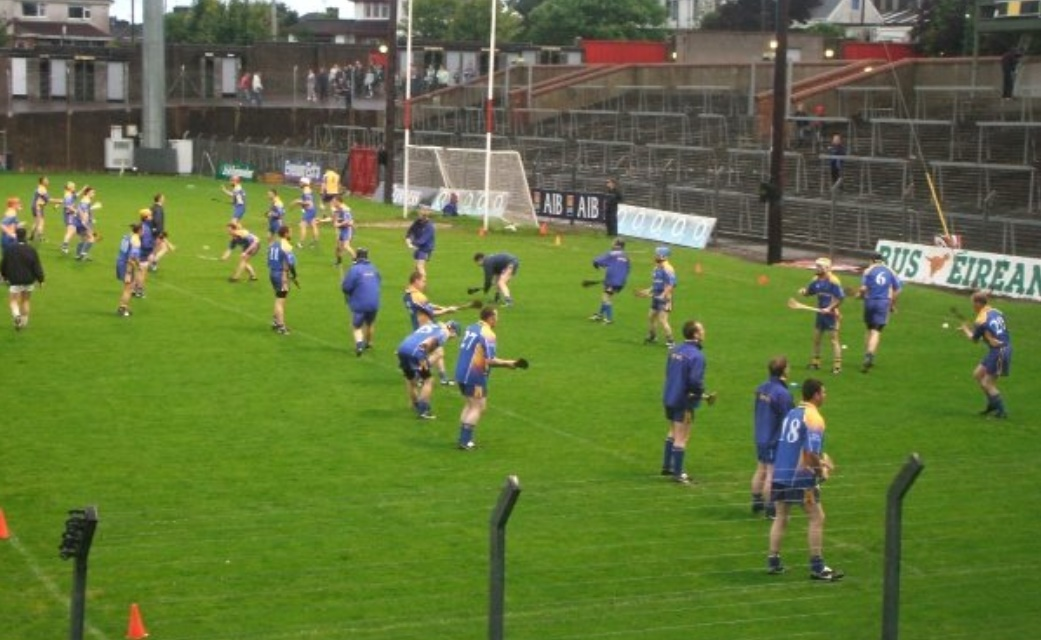
2008 County Final Warm-up

2008 Season:

2008 East Cork Junior B County Section Hurling Championship

- Semi-Final: Due to the number of teams in championship Lisgoold were given a bye to the final.
- East Cork Final: Lisgoold 1-13 to 0-9 Ballinacurra

2008 East Cork Junior B Hurling Championship

- First Round Due to the number of teams in championship Lisgoold were one of the teams given a bye to the second round.
- Second Round Lisgoold 1-30 to 3-4 Watergrasshill
- Quarter-Final Lisgoold 0-16 to 0-9 Carrignavar
- Semi-Final: Lisgoold 2-17 to 1-8 Ballinacurra
- East Cork Final: Lisgoold 2-18 to 1-9 St.Catherines

Cork County Junior B Hurling Championship

- Quarter-Final Lisgoold 4-21 to 2-6 Belgooly
- Semi-Final: Lisgoold 1-16 to 0-7 Lough Rovers
- Cork County Final: Lisgoold 2-19 v 1-7 St Mary's

Munster Junior B Hurling Championship*

- Quarter-Final Lisgoold 1-15 to 1-7 St Brendan's (Kerry)
- Semi-Final: Lisgoold 0-7 to 1-5 Bruree (Limerick)

Panel: Ciaran Cronin, Kevin O'Shea, Barry Stack, Mike O'Shea, Patrick O'Mahony, Kevin O'Loughin, Owen Hegarty, Barry Ahern, Charles Smart, Conor Walsh, Paul Stack, Denis O'Brien, Maurice Mulcahy, Noel Connery, Finbarr Brosnan, Donal O'Leary, John Cronin, Jonathon O'Shea, Maurice O'Connell, Robert Smart, Jer O'Connell, Wayne Kingston, Liam Foley, Jamie Woods, Alan Conroy, Patrick Connery, Noel O'Riordan, Darren Stack, Barry Guilly, Mike O'Riordan, Patrick Geary.

Scorers (in County final vs St. Mary's): Maurice O'Connell 2-7, Wayne Kingston 0-3, Jonathon O'Shea 0-3, Rob Smart 0-3, Liam Foley 0-2, Denis O'Brien 0-1.

*The Munster Junior B Hurling & Football Championships was only established in 2007. Hense, why no record of it exists in 1994.

=== 2014 Season All-Ireland Sevens & 'A' Grade Title ===
Summary:

On 6 September 2014, the Lisgoold junior hurlers captured the club's first All-Ireland title at the junior sevens tournament, run by St Jude's GAA Club in Dublin. First up in opposition were Clonakenny (Tipperary), against whom Lisgoold managed a narrow margin win with a last minute goal on a 6-2 to 5-4 score line. In the next two games, they beat Lucan Sarsfields (Dublin) and Brosna Gaels (Offaly). The final two group games were wins over Sixmilebridge (Clare) & Rathdowney (Laois). So, Lisgoold qualified top of their group for the All-Ireland Quarter-Final, in this game they got past Shanahoe of Laois. This meant again (as in 2012) they reached an All-Ireland semi-final against Shannon Rovers (Tipperary). On this occasion Lisgoold won the match by four points on a 4-3 to 3-2 score line. They were now in the All-Ireland final against a side from Wexford called CrossBeg Ballymurn. In the first half of the final Lisgoold went into a lead of 3-3 to 1-1 at half-time. While the Wexford team did fight back in the second half, Lisgoold held on and collected their first ever all-Ireland title at the score line of 4-7 to 4-1.

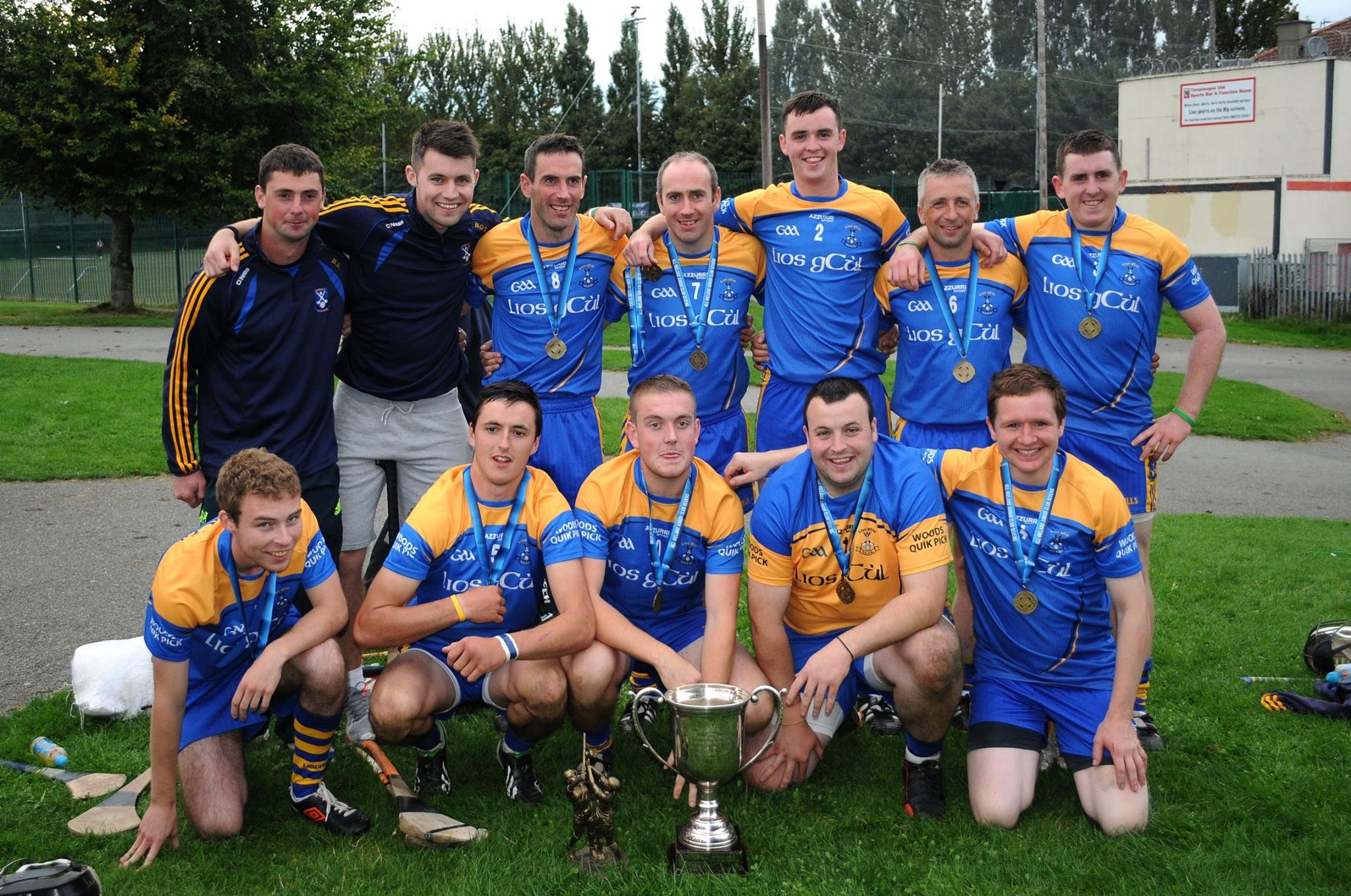
Lisgoold Junior Hurling Sevens Squad 2014 Captained by Ciaran Cronin

Record of Results:

Group Four

- Lisgoold 6-2 to 5-4 Clonakenny (Tipperary)
- Lisgoold 7-4 to 0-1 Lucan Sarsfields (Dublin)
- Lisgoold 3-4 to 1-1 Brosna Gaels (Offaly)
- Lisgoold 8-3 to 2-3 Sixmilebridge (Clare)
- Lisgoold 5-6 to 2-0 Rathdowney (Laois)

Knockout Stage:

- Quarter-Final Lisgoold 5-4 to 1-1 Shanahoe (Laois)
- Semi-Final: Lisgoold 4-3 to 3-2 Shannon Rovers (Tipperary)
- All-Ireland Final: Lisgoold 4-7 v 4-1 CrossBeg Ballymurn (Wexford)

Panel: Ciaran Cronin (Captain), John Cronin, Maurice O'Connell, Jer O'Connell, Noel Connery, Cathal Cashman, John Cashman, Jamie Woods, Denis O’Brien, Andrew O’Donovan.

Scorers (Overall): J, Cronin 14-8, J, Woods 11-6, J.Cashman 9-11, M.O’Connell 5-6, Cathal Cashman 2-1, Denis O’Brien 1-0, Noel Connery 0-1.

Junior Football Team Summary:

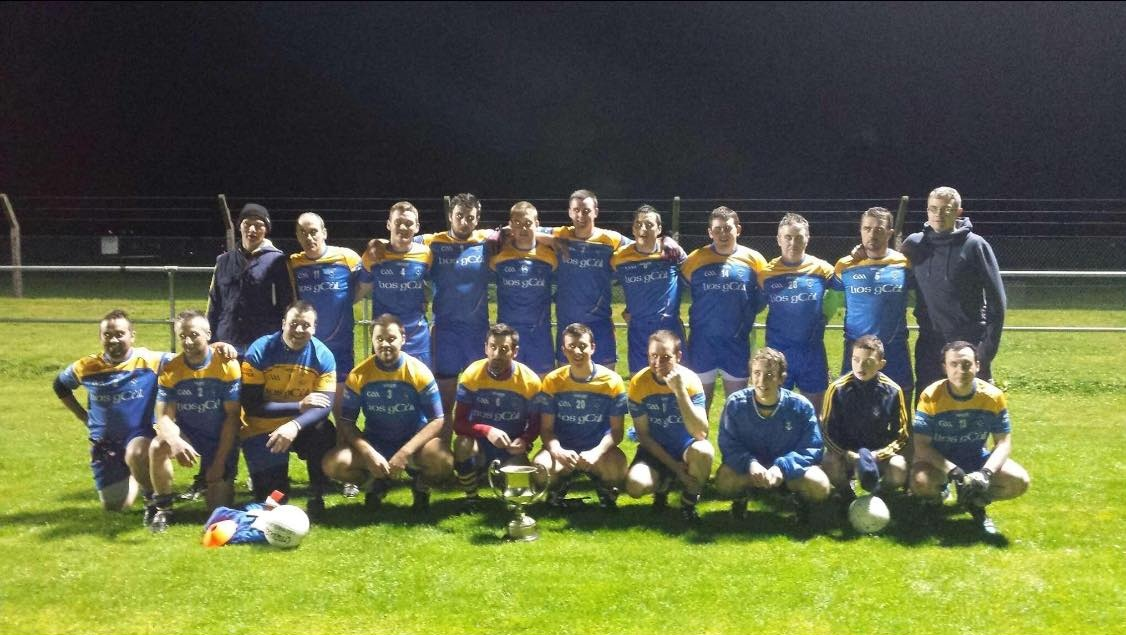
Lisgoold Junior Football Team after beating Glenbower Rvs in Division 1 League Final 2014

Even though the Junior Footballers were involved in two out of the last three East Cork finals, they faltered in championship this season, being knocked out by Dungourney in the second round. However, they recovered and produced steady results eventually qualifying for the league final. On 9 October 2014, they defeated Glenbower Rovers (who won the two finals that Lisgoold lost in) in Glenbower's home pitch to win by a last minute goal to win by 2-7 to 0-12. It was the first time an 'A' grade title was won by the club.

2014 Junior Football Season:

2014 East Cork Junior A Football Championship

- First Round Lisgoold 0-9 to 0-10 Castlemartyr
- Second round Lisgoold 2-10 to 2-15 Dungourney

East Cork Division One Football League

- Round One Lisgoold 1-8 to 0-10 Cobh
- Round Two: Lisgoold 2-10 to 0-7 Dungourney
- Round Three: Lisgoold 1-5 to 0-5 Midleton
- Round Four Lisgoold 1-14 to 2-7 Carrignavar
- Round Five: Lisgoold 0-5 to 1-9 Aghada
- Round Six: Lisgoold 1-15 to 3-4 Glenbower Rvs
- Round Seven Lisgoold 1-7 to 1-9 Erin's Own
- Round Eight: Lisgoold 0-1 to 0-0 Fr O'Neills
- League Final: Lisgoold 2-7 to 0-12 Glenbower Rovers

Cork County Junior Football League

- Quarter-Final Lisgoold 1-10 to 2-8 Killavullen

Scorers (in League FInal vs Glenbower Rovers): John Cashman 0-5, Jer O’Connell, Darragh Fleming 1-0 each, John Cronin, John McCarthy 0-1 each.

== Honours ==
=== Football ===
Competition	Winners	Runners-Up
Cork Senior Football Championship	None	1887
East Cork Junior A Football Championship	2023	2011, 2013
East Cork Junior B Football Championship	1961, 1964, 1983, 2007	1971, 1999
East Cork Junior B Football County Section**	1998, 2000, 2003, 2006	2004, 2007
East Cork Junior C Football Championship	2012	2013
East Cork Junior Division One Football League	2014	2022
East Cork Junior Division Two Football League	2000	2002, 2005, 2009
East Cork Junior Division Three Football League	1998, 2004	None
East Cork Under 21 B Football Championship	None	1978, 2001, 2002, 2015*
East Cork Under 21 C Football Championship	2011	None

=== Hurling ===
Competition	Winners	Runners-Up
All-Ireland Junior Hurling Sevens	2014	None
Cork Intermediate A Hurling championship	2024	
Cork Lower Intermediate Hurling championship	2021	
Cork Junior A Hurling Championship	2020	
Cork Junior B Hurling Championship	1994, 2008	2000, 2003
East Cork Junior B Hurling Championship	1952, 1971, 1977, 1994, 2008	1992, 2001, 2002
East Cork Junior B Hurling County Section**	1987, 1989, 1992, 1994, 2000, 2003, 2008	1993, 2004, 2005, 2007
East Cork Junior Division One Hurling League	2021	
East Cork Junior Division Two Hurling League	1989	2009 2012
East Cork Junior Division Three Hurling League	2006	None
East Cork Under 21 B Hurling Championship	None	1974, 1983, 2018
East Cork Under 21 C Hurling Championship	2009, 2011	2004

** Due to a re-structuring in club competitions in Cork GAA the East Cork Junior B County Section Championship in both codes is now defunct as of 2010.

The Cork County Junior B Football and Hurling Championship (Entry only permitted to clubs whose first adult team is competing at Junior B level.) is now an all-county competition. Thus, the need for the eight divisions in Cork GAA to run separate county section championships is not required anymore.

*Years in Bold See Notes section

=== Minor hurling ===
Competition	Winners	Runners-Up
Cork Minor A Hurling Championship	None	1976*,1977*
Cork County Minor B Hurling League	1993*	None
'Cork County Minor C Hurling League	2003	None
Cork Feile Hurling B Final	2016	2015
East Cork/East Region Minor A Hurling Championship	1962*,1975*,1976*,1977*	None
East Cork/East Region Minor B Hurling Championship	1993* 2009, 2015	2014
East Cork/East Region Minor B Hurling League	1993* 2008	None
East Cork/East Region Minor C Hurling Championship	None	2007, 2008
East Cork/East Region Minor C Hurling League	2003, 2009	None

* East Cork became East Region in January 2011, after the creation of the Rebel Og Board in 2010

Rebel Óg was launched in 2011 as an exciting new initiative by Cork G.A.A. to promote, develop and organise Gaelic Games in Cork for players up to the age of eighteen. It was formed as part of the Cork GAA Strategic vision and action plan 2010-2015.

*Years in Bold See Notes section

=== Ladies Football ===
Competition	Winners	Runners-Up
Cork Junior B Championship	None	2013
Cork Junior C Championship	2012	None
East Cork Junior C Championship	2012	None
Cork Junior Division Four League	2011	None

*Years in Bold See Notes section

== Notable players ==
This is a list of notable players who have played for Lisgoold. Generally, this means players that have played for Cork inter-county teams.

- Willie Moore (Senior Hurling 1950-1957)
- Mike Cronin (Minor Hurling 1975)
- Brian Clifford (Minor Hurling & Football 2003)
- Jonathon O'Shea (Under 21 Football 2004)
- Ciaran Cronin (Minor (2006), Under 21 (2009), Senior Hurling (2009) & Intermediate (2011))(Played in goal for Midleton CBS who won the Dr. Harty Cup in 2006)
- John Cronin (Under 21 Hurling & Football (2011,2012), Junior Football (2013) Intermediate Hurling (2014)) & Senior Hurling (2016))) (Also captained CIT GAA club to the Fitzgibbon Cup Final in 2014)
- John Cashman (Minor Hurling 2012)

== Notes ==
In 2015 Under-21 Football team, played under the Banner of "Castlegoold" (A combination of Lisgoold and Castlemartyr)

In 2004 Minor Football and Minor Hurling teams played under the Banner of "Castlegoold" (A combination of Lisgoold and Castlelyons)

In 1993 Minor Hurling team played under the Banner of "Castlelyons Rovers" (A combination of Lisgoold and Castlelyons)

In 1978 & 1980 the Minor Football team played under the Banner of "St Laurence's" (A combination of Lisgoold and Dungourney)

In 1962, 1975, 1976, & 1977 the Minor Hurling team played under the Banner of "Carrig View" (A combination of Lisgoold and Carrigtwohill)
