= Lisgoold =

Village in County Cork, Ireland

Lisgoold Lios Cúil
- Village
- Location in Ireland
- Coordinates: 51°58′24.06″N 08°13′00.26″W
- Country: Ireland
- Province: Munster
- County: County Cork
- Dáil Éireann: Cork East
- EU Parliament: South
- Time zone: UTC+0 (WET)
  - Summer (DST): UTC-1 (IST (WEST))

Lisgoold (Irish: Lios Cúil) is a village and civil parish in County Cork, Ireland. Lisgoold is in the Roman Catholic Diocese of Cloyne, and is served by St John the Baptist Catholic church. Lisgoold is part of the Cork East Dáil constituency.

== Sport ==
The local Gaelic Athletic Association club, Lisgoold GAA, have pitch and gymnasium facilities in the village. The club have Premier Intermediate hurling and Junior A football teams. The nearest soccer club is Carrigtwohill United AFC, which plays at Ballyadam, which is between Carrigtwohill and Lisgoold. Horse racing is also represented in the area, with "point-to-point" races held in the area.

== Notable residents ==
- Maurice Riordan, poet and editor
- Crystal Swing, country music group
- Paul Townend, jockey
