= Castlemartyr GAA =

Gaelic games club in County Cork, Ireland

Castlemartyr
- Baile na Martra
- Founded: 1924
- County: Cork
- Colours: Red and White

Playing kits
Standard colours

Senior Club Championships
	All Ireland	Munster champions	Cork champions
Football:	0	0	0
Hurling:	0	0	0

Castlemartyr GAA is a Gaelic Athletic Association club based in the village of Castlemartyr, County Cork, Ireland. The club fields teams in both Gaelic football and hurling. It is a member of the Imokilly division of Cork GAA.

== History ==
Castlemartyr hurling club was founded in 1924, though the area had been noted for its hurlers and footballers before that year, and a football team existed in Castlemartyr at the end of the 19th century. The early days of the club were not marked by any notable triumph, but by 1935 the club reached the East Cork final, and recorded the first of seven divisional successes.

They went on to the county final afterwards, and though they failed to capture the crown after four encounters with Mayfield, two of which were abandoned.

Christy O'Brien, who had played with the Cork minors four years earlier, was one of the stars of the 1935 team. The late Dave O'Brien captained the side and the other players on the selection were Dermot Cusack, Willie O'Brien, Robin Forrest, Jerry Wade, Jack Whelan, Willie O'Reilly, Donnachadh O'Keeffe, Michael Dineen, Joe O'Brien, Jack Harte, Matty Harte, Liam Aherne, Willie John Hennessy, Joe Morgan, Jackie Collins, Eddie Hayes, Jackie Kelleher and Mossie Moloney.

School Title

The following year, 1936, Castlemartyr won the East Cork School Shield. In 1936 also, Dermot Cusack and Dave O'Brien were selected for the Cork junior team, while Maurice Penderville gained his place on the county minor side and won a Munster medal.

Another player from this period, Ted Sullivan, had a lengthy career on the club and intercounty scene. He played with Blackrock for some time but later won Cork Senior Hurling Championship awards with the Barrs. He took part in the All-Ireland final of 1939, and in 1941 he won his first All-Ireland medal. He collected his second senior All-Ireland in 1943 and three years later he was back with his home club to help them in their successful bid to regain the divisional title.

After Castlemartyr's triumph in East Cork, Sullivan returned to the intercounty scene in 1947 and won an All-Ireland Junior Hurling Championship medal. He was a member of the first Castlemartyr team to win the county championship in 1951 and he captained the side, which won the divisional title three years later in 1954.

The Castlemartyr team which won the East Cork title for the second time in 1946 lined out as follows: Pete Wade (captain), Dermot Cusack, Dave Lawton (R.I.P.), Pakey Lawton, Val Dowling, David Barry, Edmond McCarthy, Alfie Smith, Anthony Brennan, Jackie Lwhyte, John Morgan, Paddy Cooney, Paddy Abernethy, Ted O'Sullivan (R.I.P.), Charlie McCarthy, and substitutes Garry Fleming, Sonny Draddy, Raymond Nugent, David Power, Billy Abernethy, Billy Kelly and Michael Cotter.

Representing the County Team

Paddy Abernethy joined Ted Sullivan on the Cork junior team in 1947, while four Castlemartyr players were picked for the county minor side. One of these, Billy Abernethy, would go on to win a senior All-Ireland. The others were Anthony Brennan, the last Willie O'Connell and Michael Lawton. In 1948 Val Dowling, Billy Joyce and Patrick O'Flynn gained their places on the Cork minor team and the following year marked the arrival of Liam Dowling in the county minor colours.

Liam Dowling gained nationwide fame as an All-Ireland hurler. Like Ted Sullivan, he played at full-forward and went on to win a county award with a senior club (in his case, Sarsfields, in 1957). But it was with Castlemartyr that he made his name. He joined Christy Ring on the Cork senior team in the early 'fifties and won All-Ireland medals in 1952 and 1953. He made a comeback to the Cork team in the early sixties and won his second county medal with Castlemartyr in 1964.

In 1950, Paddy Abernethy captained the Castlemartyr team which won the East Cork championship and he was at the helm again the following year when they retained the title. But 1951 was to bring more than divisional honours to the club, as in that year Castlemartyr went on to win their first county junior hurling championship.

The selection consisted of Paddy Abernethy (captain), John Burke, Raymond Nugent, Pakey Lawton, Anthony Brennan, Val Dowling, Liam Dowling, Michael Lawton, Alfie Smith, Paddy Cooney, Billy Abernethy, John O'Shea, Dominic Barry, Ted O'Sullivan, Jackie Whyte, Billy Finn, Garry Fleming, Maurice White, Dermot Whyte, Patrick O’Dwyer, Dave O'Donnell and Patrick Morgan.

Winners Again

Three years later, in 1954, Castlemartyr won the East Cork title again but this time some new faces had joined the old stars on the team. John Baker, Mossie Garde, Paddy Walsh, Frank O'Brien, Marty Fleming, John Abernethy, John Garde, Michael O'Brien and a minor player named Pat Dowling had arrived in the red and white colours of Castlemartyr. John Abernethy had played with St Finbarr's College, Farranferris in the Dr. Harty Cup final in 1952 and lined out with the Cork minors for two years. Pat Dowling went on to win an All-Ireland Junior Hurling Championship medal in 1955, a Munster senior medal in '56, a county senior medal with Sars in '57. He later emigrated to America and played hurling for the New York team.

In 1956, Castlemartyr won the East Cork minor championship having captured the award previously in 1946 and '47. But it wasn't until the early sixties that the club returned in a big way to the county championship. In 1963 Liam Dowling led them to win their sixth East Cork junior title but in the county final they were beaten by Ballincollig. However, the following year, they were back again, this time under the leadership of the U.C.C. player, John O'Keeffe.

They defeated White's Cross, Sarsfields and Shanagarry on their way to the divisional final and in the decider itself they beat Carrigtwohill by 2–10 to 4–3. Then they beat Courcey Rovers and in the county semi-final they beat Ballinhassig by one point. Their opponents in the county final were Cloughduv, which Castlemartyr won by 4–5 to 2–9.

The successful 1964 selection included: John O'Keeffe (captain), John Burke, Donie Creed, Jim Dowling, Mossie Garde, Tim Ronayne, Pat Barry, Paul Hartnett, Mick O'Mahony, Donough O'Keeffe, Donie O'Keeffe, Nick Dowling, Dominic Barry, Eddie O' Riordan, Val Dowling, Liam Dowling, Anthony Cunningham, John Greene, Denis Creed and Mick Condon.

Still There

Castlemartyr reached the final again in 1967 but were beaten by Killeagh. Castlemartyr regained the East Cork School Shield Hurling Title after a lapse of 30 years. Ted O'Sullivan, Liam Dowling and Billy Abernethy won 5 All-Ireland Senior Hurling medals between them, Pat Dowling won All-Ireland Junior and Munster Senior awards. Jackie Whyte ( 1939) and Nick Dowling (19) gained All-Ireland Minor Hurling Championship medals with Cork, Paddy Abernethy won a junior All-Ireland with Cork in 1947 and Donie O'Keeffe, John O'Keeffe, Mossie Garde and John Whyte won an All-Ireland Intermediate medal in 1965. Donie O'Keeffe went on to win another All-Ireland Intermediate Hurling Championship medal with London in 1967 when they beat Cork in the final. The club record for East Cork junior hurling medals is held by Dominic Barry who won 2 county and 5 east cork championship medals with Castlemartyr.

Castlemartyr won their only u-21 East-Cork hurling title in 1973, defeating Erin's Own in the final, while they were to be defeated in the 1975 East-Cork Junior hurling final by the same Erin's Own. 1978 was to see a first victory in football for many years when we won the B grade Championship. Castlemartyr went on to win their first east-Cork junior A football championship in 1982, before they put 3 titles back to back in 1985, 86 and 87. Players like Christy O'Sullivan, ex-Kerry senior footballer, Seanie Bowens, ex Galway minor, Dermot o'Shea, ex Millstreet senior player and Mossie Hodnett, Ex Youghal senior footballer contributed to this upsurge of football in the club. They again won east-cork junior A football titles in 1990 and 1991, a year when they went on to contest the Cork Junior Football Championship final. In 1992, the club played at Intermediate level in football and succeeded in lifting the county Intermediate football League title that year. During this time, the club also amassed a total of 7 East-cork football A league titles. The club has had a lull in recent years but the recent successes at underage level and a good win in last year's B football league augurs well for the future of this G.A.A. club as it comes together with neighbouring club Dungourney to form Kiltha Og

== Honours ==
- Munster Junior Club Hurling Championship Runners-Up 2014
- Cork Senior Football Championship Runners-Up 1893
- Cork Premier Intermediate Hurling Championship Runners-Up 2022
- Cork Intermediate A Hurling Championship Winners (1) 2021
- Cork Lower Intermediate Hurling Championship Winners (1) 2020
- Cork Junior Hurling Championship Winners (3) 1951, 1964, 2014 Runners-Up 1947, 1963
- Cork Junior Football Championship Runners-Up 1990
- Cork Minor Hurling Championship Runner-Up 1956
- East Cork Junior A Hurling Championship Winners (11) 1935, 1946, 1950, 1951, 1954, 1963, 1964, 2009, 2010, 2013, 2014 Runners-Up 1962, 1967, 1975
- East Cork Junior A Football Championship Winners (7) 1982, 1985, 1986, 1987, 1990, 1991, 2024 Runners-Up 1933

== Notable players ==
- Liam Abernethy: All-Ireland SHC-winner (1952)
- Liam Dowling: All-Ireland SHC-winner (1952, 1953)
- Brian Lawton: Munster SHC-winner (2014, 2017, 2018)
- Ciarán Joyce: All-Ireland U20HC-winner (2020, 2021)

== Sources ==
- Castlemartyr club website history (via Web Archive)
