= Castlemartyr =

Village in County Cork, Ireland

Castlemartyr Baile na Martra
- Village
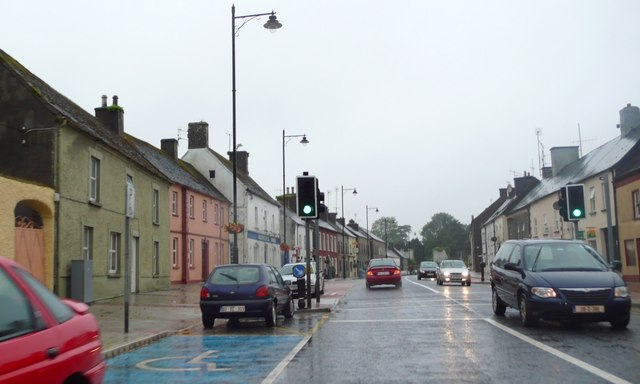
- Main Street, Castlemartyr

- Location in County Cork
- Coordinates: 51°55′N 8°03′W
- Country: Ireland
- Province: Munster
- County: County Cork
- Dáil Éireann: Cork East
- EU Parliament: South
- Elevation: 49 ft (15 m)

Population (2016)
  - Total: 1,600
- Time zone: UTC+0 (WET)
  - Summer (DST): UTC-1 (IST (WEST))
- Irish Grid Reference: W963732

Castlemartyr (Irish: Baile na Martra, formerly anglicised as Ballymarter or Ballymartyr) is a large village in County Cork, Ireland. It is around 30 kilometres (19 mi) east of Cork city, 10 km (6 mi) east of Midleton, 16 km (10 mi) west of Youghal and 6 km (4 mi) from the coast. Approximately 1,600 people live in the village and its hinterland. It is situated on the N25 national primary road and the R632 regional road. The Kiltha River, a tributary of the Womanagh River, flows through the village.

It is home to a number of community and sporting organisations, a 15th-century tower house (Castlemartyr Castle, now a ruin), and an 18th-century country house (Castlemartyr House, now a hotel).

== History ==
=== Pre-history ===
Traces of ancient civilisation, including from the Bronze Age, are to be found in the vicinity of Castlemartyr. This includes a group of tumuli (or barrow mounds), including three examples in the townland of Ballyvorisheen.

There is also evidence of the early inhabitants' attempts to defend themselves and their livestock against marauders and the threat posed by wild animals. These defences were in the form of ringforts (or raths), which were circular earthworks used as dwellings and farmyards. Examples of these structures are to be found in the vicinity of the village.

=== Ballyoughtera ===
Some of the earliest evidence for the existence of a town or "vill" in the vicinity of Castlemartyr is to be found in the Pipe Roll of Cloyne. This document lists all lands held by the feudal Bishop of Cloyne and the valuations put on those lands.

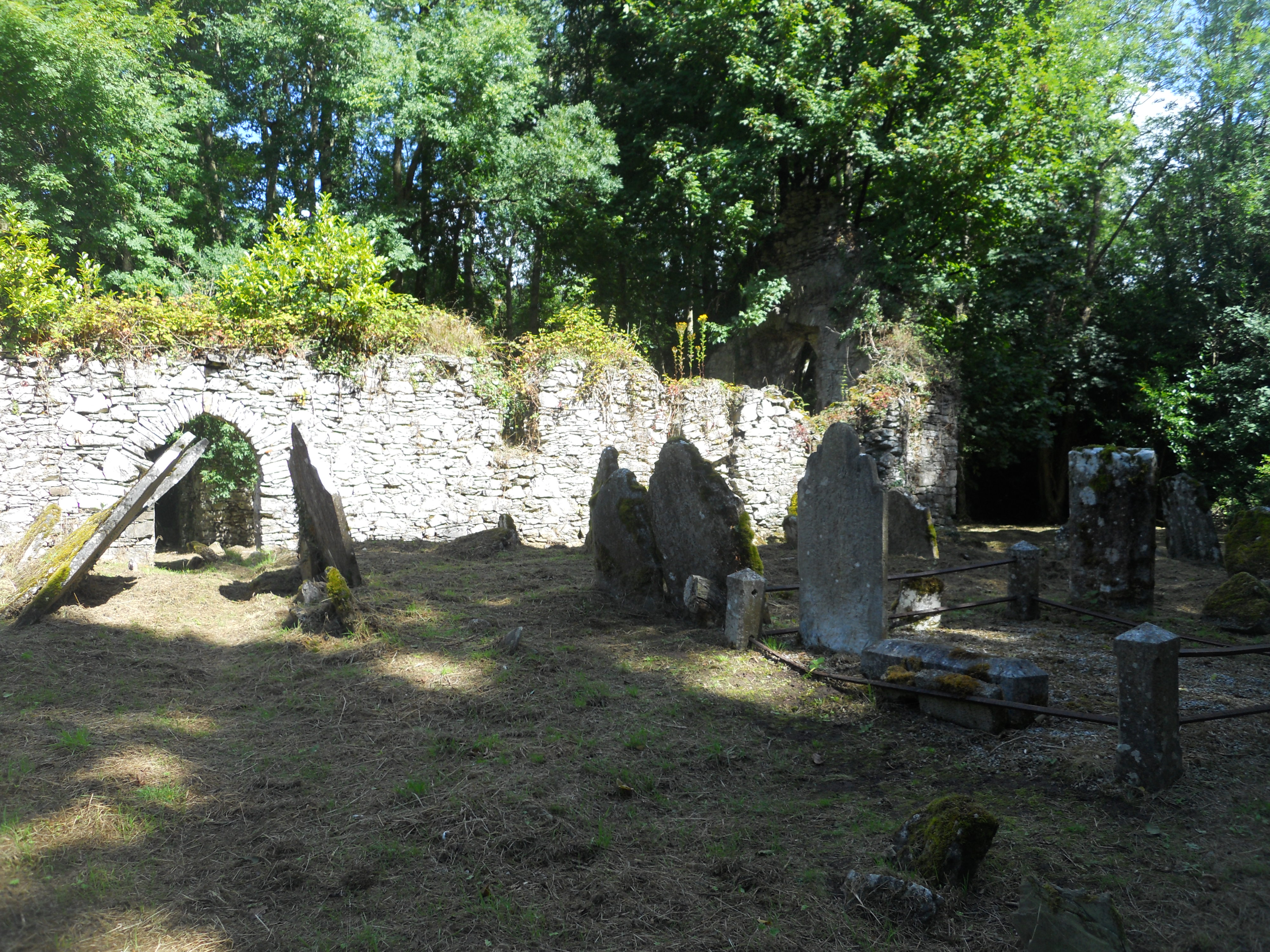
Ruins of Ballyoughtera church

Ballyoughtera, now the site of a ruin and graveyard, had likely originally been a monastic settlement which under Norman influence and through their settlement became the focal point for a "ville" or feudal village.

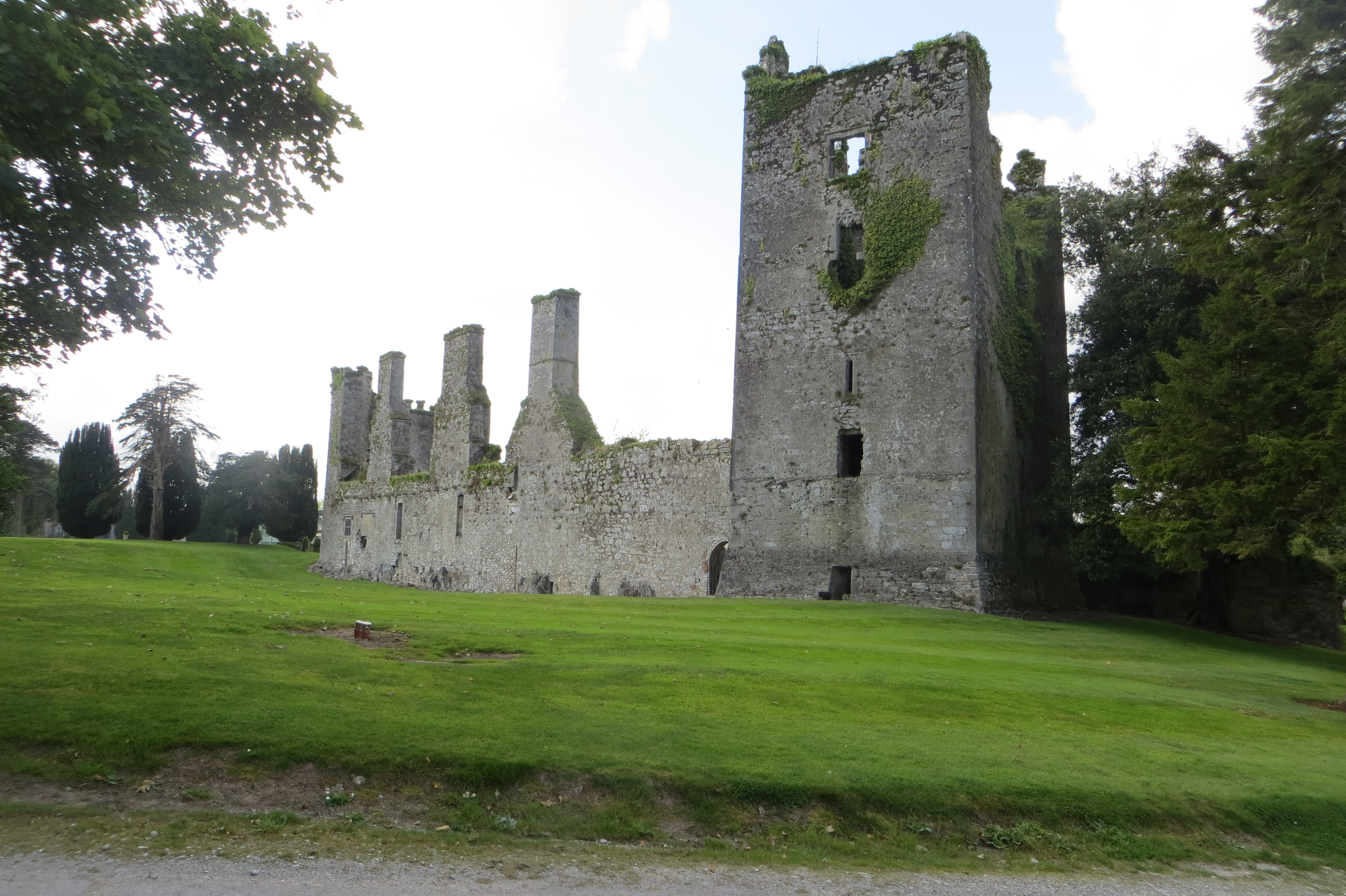
Castlemartyr Castle (built c.1420) now a ruin

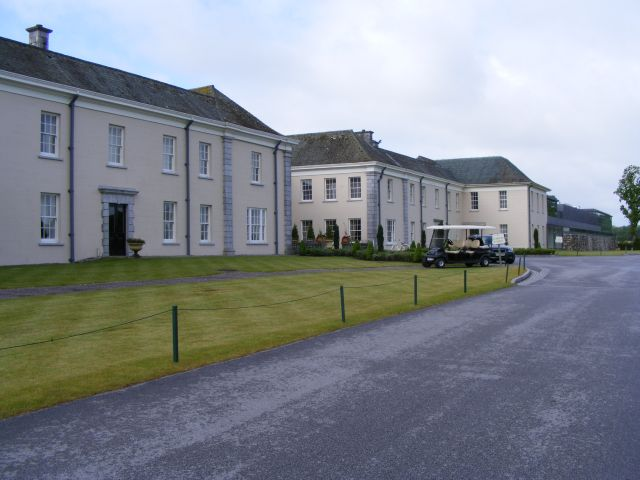
Castlemartyr House (built c.1730) now a hotel

There had been two adjoining medieval parishes, Cahirultan and Ballyoughtera and both are known to have been in existence by 1300 at least, when Ballyoughtera was valued at 5 marks and Cahairultan at 3 marks. A reference dated 1364 records that "Richard Kerdyf holds the land of the whole Ville of Martyre". A ville implied a nearby mill where tenant farmers could grind their corn, and a castle, providing those tenants with protection. In this case the castle was Castlemartyr Castle, which was built (on the site of an earlier fortification) for James FitzGerald, 6th Earl of Desmond after his appointment as Seneschal of Imokilly in 1420.

Castlemartyr was known as "Leperstown" in ancient times because of the Leper House that is said to have existed near Ballyoughtera, itself said by Smith to have become a village of some note during the Middle Ages. Another historian, Lewis, states that Ballyoughtera Church was built in 1549, only to be destroyed during the conflict of 1641–1642. There is evidence to suggest that the Church was already in ruins before 1641 (probably as early as 1615) and that it was built before 1539, with a Chancel being added on later, possibly to cope with an expanding population in and around the village.

=== The Fitzgeralds ===
In the Norman invasion of Ireland, the FitzGerald dynasty (a Geraldine line) was granted lands in the barony of Imokilly. In 1575, the Cambro-Norman castle that they built, then called the castle of Ballymartyr, was attacked by Sir Henry Sidney, the Lord Deputy, who captured the castle. The Fitzgeralds of Imokilly were known to the local peasantry as the Madraí na Fola ("Dogs of Blood") due to the blood-thirsty disposition they displayed.

=== Demise of the Fitzgeralds ===
During the Desmond Rebellion, the Fitzgeralds fought against the forces of Elizabeth I in the region. The Fitzgeralds, together with the other southern lords of the Hiberno-Norman stock (who had become "more Irish than the Irish themselves"), formed the Geraldine League to oppose the British attempts to force Protestantism on the Catholic populace and to rout the native chiefs and replace them with English landlords.

In 1581, the Earl of Ormond overran Imokilly; at Castlemartyr he captured the aged mother of the seneschal, John FitzEdmund, and hung her from the wall of the castle. FitzEdmund eventually submitted to the Earl, but he did not recover his lands. Instead, the property shared the fate of other properties after the Desmond Rebellion. It was confiscated and included in the grant of land between Lismore and Castlemartyr that were given to Sir Walter Raleigh. FitzEdmund himself was arrested in 1585 and died in Dublin Castle in the following year.

In 1602, Raleigh's lands around Castlemartyr were bought by Richard Boyle, the First Earl of Cork and ancestor to the Earls of Shannon.

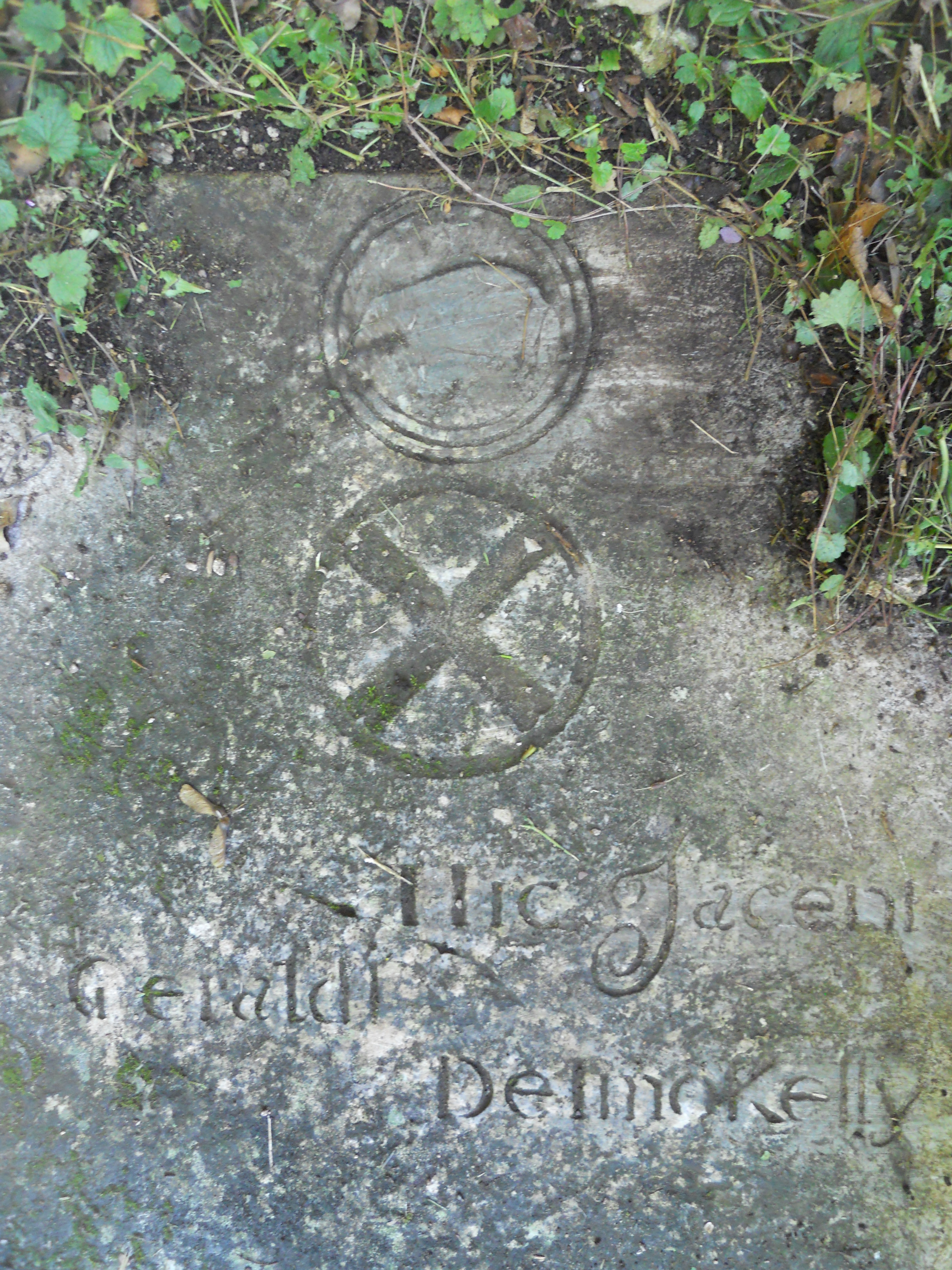
Tombstone of the FitzGerald Seneschals of Imokilly

By the early 17th century the FitzGeralds were a spent force. In the south-east corner of the old church in Ballyoughtera, the stone has a boar crest surrounded by triple incised circles and shallow cross carving which is also encircle. At the northern end of Ballyoughtera church ruin is the grave of another Richard Boyle, 4th Earl of Shannon who died in 1868. This tomb bears the inscription, "A sorrowing wife placed this stone in memory of the best and most affectionate of husbands".

=== Earls of Shannon ===
For the next two hundred years the history of Castlemartyr was closely linked with that branch of the Boyle family which have the title Earl of Shannon. In 1676, the town was incorporated with a charter, with its corporation and parliamentary representation in the control of the Boyle family. In 1689 it was a centre of Protestant resistance against the rule of James II, but was swiftly defeated by Irish Army forces under Justin MacCarthy who also put down a larger rising at Bandon.

After Orrery's death in 1679, his title was passed on to his oldest son. Orrery's second son had four sons of his own, Roger, Henry, Charles and William, and it was this Henry who became a member of the Privy Council of Ireland, Speaker of the Irish House of Commons, Chancellor of the Exchequer and Lord Chief Justice of Ireland. He was elevated to the peerage in 1756 as Baron Castlemartyr, Viscount Boyle, Earl of Shannon. It was he who provided the land for the construction of a new church in the village (St. Anne's Church of Ireland) when an act of Parliament allowed for the dismantling of Ballyoughtera Church and the re-use of some of the stones on the new church.

It was also Henry Boyle, 1st Earl of Shannon, who was primarily responsible for the construction and expansion of Castlemartyr House. He also set about beautifying the estate between the years 1733 and 1764 and these improvements are mentioned in Smith's History of Cork. On Henry's death in 1764, the estate went to his son, Richard, who like his father attained high political office. Richard carried out further extensions to the mansion house. It was also during this period that Lancelot "Capability" Brown landscaped the estate and planted woods. Richard Boyle, 2nd Earl of Shannon received £15,000 in compensation when the borough was disenfranchised under the Acts of Union 1800.

=== Famine ===
Prior to the Great Famine (1845–1849), baptismal figures in the parish of Imogeela indicate a young and expanding population with an average of 238 baptisms between the years 1836 and 1840. The decline, however, in the years immediately after the Great Famine indicate that, by 1888, baptismal figures dropped to an average of 60 per annum. Almost a quarter of what they once had been. The effects in the parish (including emigration effects) are indicated in the marriage records, with an average of 55 marriages per year prior to 1844. While, in the decade immediately after 1847, the figure had been halved, and by 1888, there were just 2 weddings in the parish of Imogeela.

=== War of Independence ===
The War of Independence also affected the village. For example, on 9 February 1920, Castlemartyr's local Royal Irish Constabulary (RIC) barracks was seized by a company from the Irish Republican Army (IRA). At the time, the barracks housed a garrison of eight men, including RIC Sergeants O'Brien and O'Sullivan. Earlier that the day, Diarmuid O'Hurley, the officer commanding the Midleton Company of the IRA, learned that two of the Castlemartyr RIC were on duty at a fair in Midleton. As part of a plan to capture the barracks, O'Hurley decided to capture these two men as they returned to Castlemartyr later in the evening. About 5pm, after their bikes were blocked by a farm cart pushed through a gateway, the two RIC men were rushed by volunteers with revolvers drawn. The unarmed RIC men were bundled into a nearby farmyard where they were blindfolded and handcuffed. At approximately 7pm an RIC constable was captured by two volunteers as he emerged from the barracks, and held captive outside the town. O'Hurley, coming from Midleton with several other volunteers, picked up the two RIC prisoners at Churchtown and advanced to Castlemartyr, before knocking at the barrack door. A constable inside, sensing danger, slightly opened the door (which had a chain on the inside), thrust out his revolver and fired. O'Hurley got his own revolver through the opening also but it failed to fire, so he struck out at his opponent's head, injuring him with a blow of his revolver and, at the same time, snapping the chain with a thrust of his foot. O'Hurley and his men were soon inside, and the remaining RIC men, under Sergeant O'Sullivan, surrendered. The volunteers removed all military equipment from the barracks without further opposition.

Separately, on the evening of 27 November 1920, Liam Heffernan, from Conna, was shot dead in the village. Heffernan was a member of "B" Company, First Battalion, First Cork Brigade (IRA), and employed as a chauffeur. The car he drove was sometimes used to convey officers of the local IRA Battalion. He and four members of the Fourth Battalion were in a car parked on Castlemartyr Main Street as the Battalion Vice Commandant was transacting some business nearby. Two passing RIC officers recognised Heffernan as he sat waiting in the car and, knowing him to be a member of the IRA, approached the car and began to question the occupants. Almost immediately, gunfire began. Although not confirmed, onlookers claimed that one of the RIC officers had shot at the occupants in the car without warning. On hearing the shots outside, the IRA officer rushed back and got into the car while shooting at the police officers. In the exchange of fire, one police officer was killed and the other was also hit. Though injured, Heffernan managed to start the car and drive it away. He swung the car sharply over the bridge and onto the Mogeely Road, but it had not gone far when it became obvious that Heffernan was dying. One of his companions took over the wheel, and they eventually reached Conna, where the local doctor pronounced Heffernan dead. An inscribed stone monument to his memory was unveiled in Castlemartyr on 23 May 1971, a short distance from the place he was shot.

=== Rolling Stones ===
While on tour in Ireland in January 1965, The Rolling Stones passed through the village on their way to play the Savoy Theatre in Cork. While Bill Wyman and Charlie Watts took tea at Mrs Farrell's eating-house, Mick Jagger, Keith Richards, and Brian Jones had a drink across the street at Barry's Bar. The documentary Charlie Is My Darling depicts a brief sequence of these events.

== Today ==
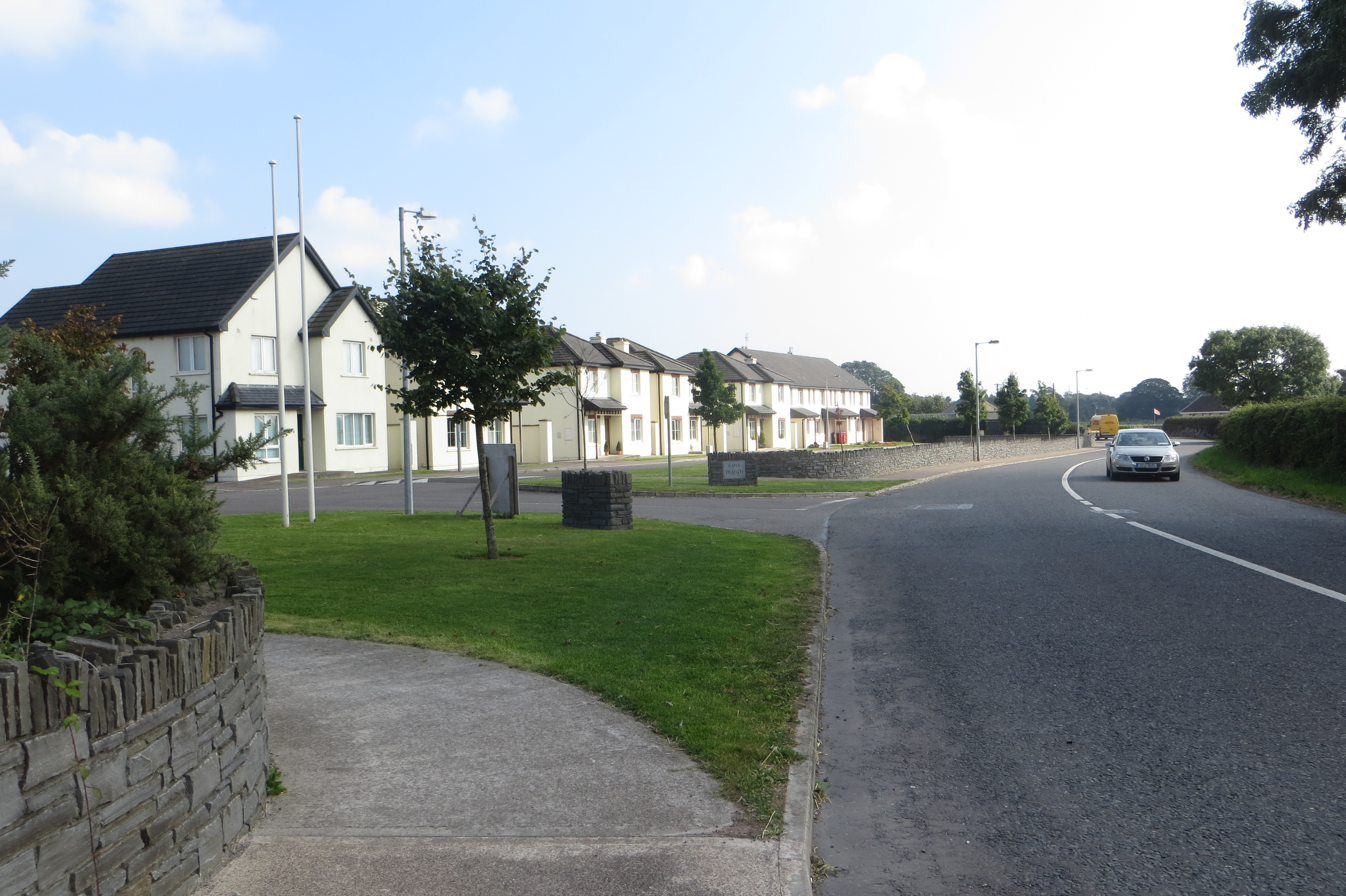
21st century housing development near Castlemartyr

Located on the N25 road between Cork and Waterford, as of the 2016 census the majority of Castlemartyr's 1,900 residents commuted less than 45 minutes to school or work. Employers in the area include the 5-star Castlemartyr Spa & Golf Resort hotel, which (as of early 2018) had approximately 200 staff. Castlemartyr Enterprise Centre is housed in the former 19th century national school.

The population is served by Saint Joseph's Roman Catholic Church (built c.1860), and Saint Anne's Church of Ireland Church (built c.1731).

There are several pubs in the village, as well as a greengrocers and small supermarket. Local sports clubs include Castlemartyr GAA club (which plays hurling and football in the Imokilly division), and Mogeely Association Football Club (which plays soccer in the West Waterford and East Cork League).

== Notable people ==
- Henry Boyle, 1st Earl of Shannon (1682–1764), Anglo-Irish politician and speaker of the Irish House of Commons from 1733 to 1756
- Liam Dowling (1931–1996), All-Ireland winning hurler
- Anna Millikin (fl.1764–1849) author of Gothic novels and founder of the literary periodical Hesperian Magazine
- Ted O'Sullivan (1920–1968), All-Ireland winning hurler
- Richard John Uniacke (1753–1830), abolitionist, lawyer, member of the Nova Scotia House of Assembly and Attorney General of Nova Scotia

== See also ==
- List of abbeys and priories in Ireland (County Cork)
- List of towns and villages in Ireland
- Market Houses in Ireland
- Castlemartyr (Parliament of Ireland constituency)
