= 2023 Mid Cork Junior A Hurling Championship =

- Dates: 5 August - 15 October 2023
- Teams: 10
- Sponsor: MJK Oil Ltd
- Champions: Ballinora (9th title); Darragh Holmes (captain); Don O'Brien (manager)
- Runners-up: Dripsey; Killian Kelleher (captain); Ger Manley (manager)

Tournament statistics
- Matches played: 17
- Goals scored: 52 (3.06 per match)
- Points scored: 525 (30.88 per match)
- Top scorer(s): Michael O'Riordan (5-32)

The 2023 Mid Cork Junior A Hurling Championship was the 99th staging of the Mid Cork Junior A Hurling Championship since its establishment by the Mid Cork Board in 1925. The draw for the group stage placings took place on 20 February 2023. The championship ran from 5 August to 15 October 2023.

Ballinora entered the championship as the defending champions.

The final was played on 15 October 2023 at the Cloughduv Grounds, between Ballinora and Dripsey, in what was their first ever meeting in the final. Ballinora won the match by 0–15 to 1–09 to claim their ninth championship title overall and a third title in succession.

Dripsey's Michael O'Riordan was the championship's top scorer with 5-32.

== Group 1 ==
=== Group 1 table ===
Knockout stage

Team	Matches				Score			Pts
Team	Pld	W	D	L	For	Against	Diff	Pts
Ballinora	3	3	0	0	93	45	48	6
Kilmichael	3	2	0	1	59	64	-5	4
Ballincollig	3	1	0	2	57	81	-24	2
Inniscarra	3	0	0	3	43	62	-19	0

=== Group 1 results ===
5 August 2023 Round 1	Ballinora	3-14 - 1-10	Inniscarra	Coachford Sportsfield
	A O'Shea 2-2, L Lyons 0-6, J Keohane 1-0, J Byrne 0-2, J Murphy 0-1, D Corkery 0-1, D Holmes 0-1, T Burns 0-1.	Report	C Desmond 0-6, S Linehan 1-0, D Óg Coleman 0-3, M Linehan 0-1.

6 August 2023 Round 1	Ballincollig	0-19 - 3-17	Kilmichael	Cloughduv Grounds
	A Willis 0-10, S Walsh 0-4, S O'Sullivan 0-1, P Kelly 0-1, R O'Connor 0-1, S Murphy 0-1, R Power 0-1.	Report	P Kelleher 0-9, C Cotter 1-5, F Buckley 1-0, B Cotter 1-0, R Murphy 0-1, C O'Connell 0-1, T Downey 0-1.

13 August 2023 Round 2	Ballinora	4-24 - 1-13	Ballincollig	Ovens Grounds
		Report

13 August 2023 Round 2	Inniscarra	1-08 - 1-14	Kilmichael	Páirc Eoin Mhic Charthaigh
	S Linehan 0-4, M O'Connell 1-0, D Dineen 0-2, D Óg Coleman 0-1, J Cussen 0-1.	Report	P Kelleher 1-9, R Murphy 0-1, A Kelleher 0-1, C Cotter 0-1, B Cotter 0-1, C O'Connell 0-1.

1 September 2023 Round 3	Inniscarra	1-16 - 1-19	Ballincollig	Blarney Grounds
		Report

1 September 2023 Round 3	Ballinora	5-19 - 1-13	Kilmichael	Cloughduv Grounds
	A O'Shea 2-4, T Burns 1-3, D Holmes 1-1, K Murphy 1-0, S Kingston 0-3, J Byrne 0-3, L Lyons 0-3, D Corkery 0-2.	Report	C Cotter 0-9, B Cotter 0-4, C O'Connell 1-0.

== Group 2 ==
=== Group 2 table ===
Knockout stage

Team	Matches				Score			Pts
Team	Pld	W	D	L	For	Against	Diff	Pts
Dripsey	2	2	0	0	57	19	38	4
Blarney	2	1	0	1	39	47	-8	2
Cloughduv	2	0	0	2	39	69	-30	0

=== Group 2 results ===
6 August 2023 Round 1	Dripsey	2-15 - 0-06	Blarney	Páirc Eoin Mhic Charthaigh
	M O'Riordan 2-9.	Report

13 August 2023 Round 2	Blarney	3-24 - 4-14	Cloughduv	Grenagh Grounds

3 September 2023 Round 3	Dripsey	4-25 - 1-10	Cloughduv	Coachford Sportsfield
	M O'Riordan 3-11, E Maher 0-4, G Murphy 1-0, K Kelleher 0-3, M O'Sullivan 0-3, D O'Riordan 0-2, D O'Sullivan 0-1, J Buckley 0-1.		B Ahern 0-8, T Twomey 1-0, C O'Leary 0-2.

== Group 2 ==
=== Group 3 table ===
Knockout stage

Team	Matches				Score			Pts
Team	Pld	W	D	L	For	Against	Diff	Pts
Grenagh	2	1	1	0	45	29	16	3
Éire Óg	2	1	0	1	34	49	-15	2
Donoughmore	2	0	1	1	32	33	-1	1

=== Group 3 results ===
6 August 2023 Round 1	Grenagh	3-22 - 1-12	Éire Óg	Ballymaw Grounds
		Report	D Coakley 1-3, C Sheehan 0-3, D Braham 0-2, F O'Leary 0-2, C Clifford 0-1, C Malone 0-1.

11 August 2023 Round 2	Éire Óg	1-16 - 0-18	Donoughmore	Ballyanly Grounds
	C Sheehan 1-14, C Kidney 0-1, D Braham 0-1.		D O'Connell 0-9, C O'Callaghan 0-3, D Lawton 0-2, S Golden 0-1, M Lucey 0-1, G Buckley 0-1, K O'Connell 0-1.

3 September 2023 Round 3	Grenagh	0-14 - 1-11	Donoughmore	Ballymaw Grounds
		Report

== Knockout stage ==
=== Quarter-finals ===
16 September 2023 Quarter-final	Grenagh	1-18 - 1-08	Blarney	Páirc Eoin Mhic Charthaigh
	S Joyce 0-7, T Twomey 0-5, D Coleman 1-1, D Twomey 0-3, U Duggan 0-1, M O'Riordan 0-1.	Report	J Murphy 0-5, J Cronin 1-1, M O'Leary 0-2.

16 September 2023 Quarter-final	Kilmichael	1-20 - 0-12	Éire Óg	Cloughduv Grounds
	P Kelleher 1-8, B Cotter 0-5, C Cotter 0-5, C O'Connell 0-1, A Kelleher 0-1.	Report	C Sheehan 0-5, L Considine 0-5, D Foley 0-1, F O'Leary 0-1.

=== Semi-finals ===
1 October 2023 Semi-final	Dripsey	2-19 - 1-16	Kilmichael	Ovens Grounds
	D O'Riordan 2-4, M O'Riordan 0-6, J Manley 0-2, E Maher 0-2, S Burke 0-2, M O'Sullivan 0-2, M o'Connell 0-1.	Report	P Kelleher 0-8, A McCarthy 1-0, C Cotter 0-3, A Kelleher 0-2, B Cotter 0-1, R Murphy 0-1, F Buckley 0-1.

1 October 2023 Semi-final	Ballinora	1-21 - 2-15 (aet)	Grenagh	Ballyanly Grounds
	L Lyons 0-8, J Keohane 1-3, A O'Shea 0-2, S Kingston 0-2, J Byrne 0-2, D Corkery 0-2, D Holmes 0-1, T Burns 0-1.	Report	D Coleman 0-9, D Twomey 1-3, B Walsh 1-0, S Cronin 0-2, C Cronin 0-1.

=== Final ===
15 October 2023 Final	Ballinora	0-15 - 1-09	Dripsey	Cloughduv Grounds
	S Kingston 0-5, L Lyons 0-3, D Holmes 0-2, K Murphy 0-2, T Burns 0-2, J Keohane 0-1.		M O'Riordan 0-6, D O'Riordan 1-1, E Maher 0-2.	Referee: B Barry-Murphy (Aghabullogue)
