= 1993 Cork Junior A Hurling Championship =

- Dates: 26 September - 31 October 1993
- Teams: 7
- Champions: Blarney (2nd title); Gary Nagle (captain)
- Runners-up: Kilworth; Ollie Sheehan (captain)

Tournament statistics
- Matches played: 7
- Goals scored: 18 (2.57 per match)
- Points scored: 128 (18.29 per match)
- Top scorer(s): Pat Greehy (2-13)

The 1993 Cork Junior A Hurling Championship was the 96th staging of the Cork Junior A Hurling Championship since its establishment by the Cork County Board. The draw for the opening fixtures took place on 13 December 1992. The championship ran from 26 September to 31 October 1993.

The final was played on 31 October 1993 at Páirc Uí Chaoimh in Cork between Blarney and Kilworth, in what was their first meeting in the final. Blarney won the match by 2-10 to 1-09 to claim their second championship title overall and a first title in 57 years.

Kilworth's Pat Greehy was the championship's top scorer with 2-13.

== Qualification ==
Division	Championship	Champions
Avondhu	North Cork Junior A Hurling Championship	Kilworth
Carbery	South West Junior A Hurling Championship	Argideen Rangers
Carrigdhoun	South East Junior A Hurling Championship	Courcey Rovers
Duhallow	Duhallow Junior A Hurling Championship	Meelin
Imokilly	East Cork Junior A Hurling Championship	Castlelyons
Muskerry	Mid Cork Junior A Hurling Championship	Blarney
Seandún	City Junior A Hurling Championship	Glen Rovers

== Results ==
=== Quarter-finals ===
26 September 1993 Quarter-final	Courcey Rovers	1-07 - 1-07	Castlelyons	Páirc Uí Chaoimh
	C Murphy 1-1, B Fitzgerald 0-2, M Spillane 0-2, P Cashman 0-1, P Randles 0-1.		D Nyhan 1-3, D Crowley 0-4.	Referee: E Murphy (Douglas)

2 October 1993 Quarter-final	Blarney	2-10 - 1-09	Argideen Rangers	Cloughduv Grounds
	S O'Donoghue 1-2, F Coleman 1-0, T Harrington 0-3, A Murphy 0-3, G Nagle 0-1, B Sheehan 0-1.		T Crowley 0-5, J Crowley 1-0, B Harte 0-3, M Foley 0-1.	Referee: E Murphy (Douglas)

3 October 1993 Quarter-final replay	Courcey Rovers	3-08 - 2-08	Castlelyons	Páirc Uí Chaoimh
	G Sweetnam 1-2, D Corcoran 1-1, D Nyhan 1-0, D Crowley 0-3, S Twomey 0-1, J Hayes 0-1.		B Fitzgerald 0-4, J Quirke 1-0, S McAuliffe 1-0, P Randles 0-1, P Cashman 0-1, S Cotter 0-1, M Spillane 0-1.	Referee: E Murphy (Douglas)

10 October 1993 Quarter-final	Kilworth	2-09 - 1-11	Meelin	Kanturk Grounds
	P Greehy 1-4, S Carey 1-2, P Shanahan 0-2, M Gowen 0-1.		T Mahony 1-2, N Brosnan 0-4, P O'Callaghan 0-2, D Fitzpatrick 0-1, J Brosnan 0-1, G Angland 0-1.	Referee: T Manley (Inniscarra)

- Glen Rovers received a bye in this round.

=== Semi-finals ===
17 October 1993 Semi-final	Blarney	1-13 - 0-11	Courcey Rovers	Páirc Uí Rinn
	A Murphy 1-5, G Nagle 0-3, S O'Donoghue 0-3, F Coleman 0-1, B Sheehan 0-1.		D Nyhan 0-7, D Corcoran 0-2, D Crowley 0-1, D Twomey 0-1.	Referee: E Murphy (Douglas)

17 October 1993 Semi-final	Kilworth	1-09 - 0-07	Glen Rovers	Páirc Lios gCúl
	S Carey 1-3, P Greehy 0-5, P Shanahan 0-1.		T Harte 0-5, D Cronin 0-1, J Graham 0-1.	Referee: P Spillane (Carrigtwohill)

=== Final ===
31 October 1993 Final	Blarney	2-10 - 1-09	Kilworth	Páirc Uí Chaoimh
	A Murphy 1-4, F Coleman 1-0, S O'Donoghue 0-3, T Harrington 0-2, R O'Sullivan 0-1.		P Greehy 1-4, A Kenny 0-2, S Barry 0-1, N O'Brien 0-1, S Carey 0-1.

== Championship statistics ==
=== Top scorers ===
Overall

Rank	Player	Club	Tally	Total	Matches	Average
1	Pat Greehy	Kilworth	2-13	19	3	6.33
2	Anthony Murphy	Blarney	2-12	18	3	6.00
3	Donie Nyhan	Courcey Rovers	2-10	16	3	5.33
4	Seán Carey	Kilworth	2-06	12	3	4.00
5	Simon O'Donoghue	Blarney	1-08	11	3	3.66

In a single game

Rank	Player	Club	Tally	Total	Opposition
1	Anthony Murphy	Blarney	1-05	8	Courcey Rovers
2	Pat Greehy	Kilworth	1-04	7	Meelin
2	Anthony Murphy	Blarney	1-04	7	Kilworth
2	Pat Greehy	Kilworth	1-04	7	Blarney
2	Donie Nyhan	Courcey Rovers	0-07	7	Blarney
6	Donie Nyhan	Courcey Rovers	1-03	6	Castlelyons
6	Seán Carey	Kilworth	1-03	6	Glen Rovers
8	Simon O'Donoghue	Blarney	1-02	5	Argideen Rangers
8	Ger Sweetnam	Courcey Rovers	1-02	5	Castlelyons
8	Seán Carey	Kilworth	1-02	5	Meelin
8	Thomas Mahony	Meelin	1-02	5	Kilworth
8	Tony Crowley	Argideen Rangers	0-05	5	Blarney
8	Pat Greehy	Kilworth	0-05	5	Glen Rovers
8	Tim Harte	Glen Rovers	0-05	5	Kilworth
