= 2020 Cork Intermediate A Hurling Championship =

- Dates: 1 August 2020 - 7 August 2021
- Teams: 12
- Sponsor: Co-Op Superstores
- Champions: Éire Óg (3rd title); Kevin Hallissey (captain); Jerome Kelleher (captain)
- Runners-up: Aghabullogue; Ian Barry-Murphy (captain)
- Relegated: Argideen Rangers

Tournament statistics
- Matches played: 25
- Goals scored: 55 (2.2 per match)
- Points scored: 842 (33.68 per match)
- Top scorer(s): Cormac Duggan (4-35)

The 2020 Cork Intermediate A Hurling Championship was the inaugural staging of the Cork Intermediate A Hurling Championship and the 111th staging overall of a championship for middle-ranking intermediate hurling teams in Cork. The draw for the group stage placings took place on 19 November 2019. The championship was scheduled to begin in April 2020, however, it was postponed indefinitely due to the impact of the COVID-19 pandemic on Gaelic games. The championship eventually began on 1 August 2020 and, after being suspended once again on 5 October 2020, ended on 7 August 2021.

On 7 August 2021, Éire Óg won the championship after a 2-16 to 1-17 defeat of Aghabullogue in the final at Páirc Uí Chaoimh. It was their third championship title overall and their first title since 1985.

Cormac Duggan was the championship's top scorer with 4-35.

== Format change ==
On 26 March 2019, three championship proposals were circulated to Cork club delegates. A core element running through all three proposals, put together by the Cork GAA games workgroup, was that there be a group stage of 12 teams, straight relegation, and one team from the divisions/colleges section to enter at the preliminary quarter-final stage. On 2 April 2019, a majority of 136 club delegates voted for Option A which would see one round of games played in April and two more in August – all with county players available.

== Team changes ==
=== From Championship ===
Promoted to the Cork Premier Intermediate Hurling Championship

- Blackrock

Regraded to the Cork Lower Intermediate Hurling Championship

- Kilbrittain
- Tracton
- St Finbarrs
- Castlemartyr
- St Catherine’s
- Barryroe
- Ballymartle
- Grenagh
- Ballygarvan
- Milford
- Dripsey

Regraded to the South East Junior A Hurling Championship

- Ballinhassig

Regraded to the City Junior A Hurling Championship

- Na Piarsaigh

== Participating teams ==
The club rankings were based on a championship performance 'points' system over the previous four seasons.

Team	Location	Colours	Seeding	Ranking
Éire Óg	Ovens	Red and yellow	A	1
Kildorrery	Kildorrery	Blue and white	A	2
Cloughduv	Cloughduv	Green and yellow	A	3
Sarsfields	Glanmire	Blue, white and black	B	4
Mayfield	Mayfield	Red and white	B	5
Aghabullogue	Coachford	Green and white	B	6
Glen Rovers	Blackpool	Red and yellow	C	7
Dungourney	Dungourney	Yellow and green	C	8
Meelin	Meelin	Green and yellow	C	9
Douglas	Douglas	Green, black and white	D	10
Midleton	Midleton	Black and white	D	11
Argideen Rangers	Timoleague	Maroon and white	D	12

== Results ==
=== Group 1 ===
==== Table ====
Advance to knockout stage Advance to relegation play-offs

Team	Matches				Score			Pts
Team	Pld	W	D	L	For	Against	Diff	Pts
Kildorrery	3	3	0	0	5-64	4-43	24	6
Mayfield	3	2	0	1	3-47	1-50	3	4
Dungourney	3	1	0	2	1-50	5-49	-11	2
Argideen Rangers	3	0	0	3	2-41	1-60	-16	0

==== Results ====
1 August 2020 Round 1	Dungourney	0-17 - 0-14	Argideen Rangers	Ballinora Sportsfield
	R Denny (1 sideline) 0-5, B Ahern (4f) 0-4, M Leahy, N Motherway 0-2 each D Healy, Colm Griffin, Cormac Griffin, S McCarthy 0-1 each.	Report	JM O’Callaghan (7f) 0-9, E Lawton 0-2, S Maxwell, B Hennessy 0-1 each.	Referee: J Horgan (Gleann na Laoi)

2 August 2020 Round 1	Kildorrery	0-20 - 2-13	Mayfield	Castlelyons Sportsfield
	P O'Brien (0-10, 5f, 2'65s) F Stapleton (0-2), J McEniry (0-2), P J Keating (0-1), S Fitzgerald (0-1), D Kelly (0-1), J Keating (0-1), C Harrington (0-1), E O'Connor (0-1).	Report	D O'Neill (0-11f), S Duggan (1-0), D Wyse (1-0 pen). S O'Donovan (0-1), D Lucey (0-1).	Referee: W Wallace (Aghada)

9 August 2020 Round 2	Argideen Rangers	1-10 - 1-21	Kildorrery	Páirc Eoin Mhic Charthaigh
	JM O’Callaghan (1-9, 0-8 frees, 1-0 pen), E Lawton (0-1).	Report	P O’Brien (1-10, 1-7 frees), F Stapleton (0-3), J McEniry (0-2), D Kelly, A O’Brien, J Keating, W Fouhy, C O’Baoill, J O’Sullivan (0-1 each).	Referee: L Barry (Ballincollig)

9 August 2020 Round 2	Mayfield	1-12 - 0-13	Dungourney	Páirc Lios gCúl
	K Punch (1-2), D O’Neill (frees), S O’Donovan (0-4 each), D Malone, P Duggan (0-1 each).	Report	R Denny, B Ahern (2 65s), Cormac Griffin (frees) (0-3 each), N Motherway (0-2), J Griffin, Shane Hegarty (0-1 each).	Referee: J Murphy (Castletownroche)

30 August 2020 Round 3	Argideen Rangers	1-17 - 0-22	Mayfield	Brinny Sportsfield
	JM O’Callaghan (0-7, 6f), B Hennessy (1-1), S Maxwell (0-3), B Fleming (0-2), D O’Donovan, M Lawton, P Butler, E Lawton (0-1 each).	Report	D O’Neill (0-6,1 65, 3f), S O’Donovan (0-4), D Lucey (0-3), K Punch (0-3), P Duggan (0-2), S Duggan (0-2), N Kelly, D Malone (0-1 each).

30 August 2020 Round 3	Dungourney	1-20 - 4-23	Kildorrery	Rathcormac
	R Denny (0-9, 7 frees), S Hegarty (1-2), D Healy, Cormac Griffin and N Motherway (0-2 each), B Ahern (free), S McCarthy and N McGrath (0-1 each).	Report	P O’Brien (0-8, 5 frees, 1 ’65), A O’Brien (2-2), J McEniry (2-1)F Stapleton (0-5), J Keating (0-3), J O’Gorman, M Walsh, W Fouhy and E O’Connor (0-1 each).

=== Group 2 ===
==== Table ====
Advance to knockout stage Advance to relegation play-offs

Team	Matches				Score			Pts
Team	Pld	W	D	L	For	Against	Diff	Pts
Éire Óg	3	3	0	0	5-69	2-33	45	6
Sarsfields	3	2	0	1	7-57	2-46	26	4
Douglas	3	1	0	2	3-36	7-58	-34	2
Meelin	3	0	0	3	0-46	4-71	-37	0

==== Results ====
2 August 2020 Round 1	Meelin	0-16 - 1-16	Douglas	Páirc Eoin Mhic Charthaigh
	J Forrest (0-11, 9 frees), W Murphy (0-2), N Linehan, J Curtin, L Collins (0-1 each).	Report	C Russell (0-7), R Murphy (0-4, 3 frees), J Moylan (1-0), B Maher (0-2), M Dolan, D O’Mahony, F O Loinsigh (0-1 each).	Referee: L Barry (Ballincollig)

2 August 2020 Round 1	Éire Óg	0-20 - 2-09	Sarsfields	Páirc Liam Mhic Carthaigh
	K Hallissey 0-6 (2f), E O’Shea 0-5 (3f, 1 65), C O’Callaghan 0-3, L Considine 0-3, C Sheehan 0-1, John Cooper 0-1, Joe Cooper 0-1	Report	B Graham 1-7 (1-3f, 0-3 65, 1 LB), A Hackett 1-0, C Duggan 0-1, G Gray 0-1 (f).

9 August 2020 Round 2	Douglas	0-11 - 4-21	Éire Óg	Ballincollig Sportsfield
	R Murphy (0-5 (4f, 1 65), J Moylan (0-2), D O'Mahony, B Maher, M Dolan, D Murphy (0-1 each).	Report	L Considine (2-5), C O'Calllaghan (1-2), D Goulding (1-1), E O'Shea (0-5, 2f), K Hallissey, C Sheehan (0-4 each).	Referee: S Scanlon (newcestown)

9 August 2020 Round 2	Sarsfields	2-27 - 0-17	Meelin	O'Connell Park
	P O’Driscoll (1-7), C Duggan (0-8, 4f, 1’65), K Murphy (0-5), C McCarthy (1-1), S O’Driscoll (0-3), J O’Leary, K Walsh, E O’Sullivan 0-1 each.	Report	J Forrest (0-6, 4f), M O’Keeffe (0-2f), W Murphy (0-2), L O’Sullivan (0-2), J O’Callaghan (0-2), T J Brosnan, J Curtin, T J Twomey (0-1 each).	Referee: M Walsh (St. Catherine's)

30 August 2020 Round 3	Douglas	2-09 - 3-21	Sarsfields	Blarney Sportsfield
	L O'Keeffe 1-1, R Murphy 0-4 (0-3 f), J Moylan 1-0, M Dolan 0-2, A O'Hare J Harte 0-1 each.	Report	C Duggan 3-9 (0-6 f), P O'Driscoll, K Murphy 0-3 each, E O'Sullivan, D Allen 0-2 each, R Hogan, T Murphy 0-1 each.

30 August 2020 Round 3	Meelin	0-13 - 1-28	Éire Óg	Mallow GAA Complex
	James Forrest (0-8, 7f); L Collins (0-2); W Murphy, John Forrest, C Curtin (0-1 each).	Report	Joe Cooper (1-5); E O’Shea (0-8, 5f); L Considine (0-7, 1f); John Cooper (0-3); D McCarthy (0-2); B Hurley (1f), F O’Rourke, D Dineen (0-1 each).

=== Group 3 ===
==== Table ====
Advance to knockout stage Advance to relegation play-offs

Team	Matches				Score			Pts
Team	Pld	W	D	L	For	Against	Diff	Pts
Aghabullogue	3	3	0	0	2-62	4-39	17	6
Cloughduv	3	2	0	1	6-49	4-55	0	4
Midleton	3	1	0	2	2-50	1-53	0	2
Glen Rovers	3	0	0	3	3-45	4-59	-14	0

==== Results ====
2 August 2020 Round 1	Glen Rovers	1-11 - 0-19	Midleton	Páirc Uí Chonaill
	E O’Connell 1-5 (3f, 1 65), P Virgo 0-3, D Browne, D Cunningham, and G Kennefick 0-1 each.	Report	A Mulcahy 0-12 (11f), J Hegarty, P O’Brien, C Crowley 0-2 each, R O’Regan 0-1.	Referee: A Hyland (Kilworth)

2 August 2020 Round 1	Cloughduv	2-09 - 2-20	Aghabullogue	Ballincollig Sportsfield
	M Walsh 1-4, B Verling(2f) 1-3, A Murphy 0-2.	Report	S Tarrant 0-10 (0-6 f), M Bradley 0-6 (0-1 f), D Dineen 0-3, L Casey 1-0, I Barry-Murphy 0-1.	Referee: A O'Connor (Ballygarvan)

9 August 2020 Round 2	Midleton	1-16 - 0-21	Cloughduv	Carraig na bhFear Sportsfield
	A Mulcahy 1-6 (0-2 f), J Hegarthy 0-4, K Finn 0-3, E Mitchell, P O’Brien and R O’Regan 0-1 each.	Report	M Walsh 0-6, B Verling 0-6 (0-3 f), M Verling 0-4 (0-1 f), S O’Connor 0-2, W Ahern, D O’Leary and E Clifford 0-1 each.	Referee: J Horgan (Gleann na Laoi)

9 August 2020 Round 2	Aghabullogue	0-21 - 1-15	Glen Rovers	Blarney Sportsfield
	M Bradley (0-10, 6f), S Tarrant (0-4, 3f), D Dineen (0-3), I Barry-Murphy (0-2), B Casey and N Barry-Murphy (0-1 each).	Report	E O’Connell (0-11, 7f), R McGuckin (1-0), G Kennefick, D Browne, M Dooley and S Busteed (0-1 each).	Referee: P O'Driscoll (Bride Rovers)

30 August 2020 Round 3	Glen Rovers	1-19 - 4-19	Cloughduv	Páirc Uí Rinn
	E O’Connell (1-8, 5f), D Brown (0-5), P Virgo (0-3), A Evans (0-1f), D Busteed and C McGuckan (0-1 each).	Report	M Verling (4-5), B Verling (0-10, 5 frees), M Walsh (0-3), K Walsh (0-1).

30 August 2020 Round 3	Midleton	1-15 - 0-21	Aghabullogue	Ballinora Sportsfield
	A Mulcahy (0-13, 12 frees); P Connaughton (1-1); A Daly (0-1).	Report	S Tarrant (0-10, 9 frees); M Bradley (0-4); D Dineen (0-2); P Ring, S Feury, J Buckley, B Casey, L Casey (0-1 each).

=== Relegation section ===
==== Table ====
Relegated

Team	Matches				Score			Pts
Team	Pld	W	D	L	For	Against	Diff	Pts
Meelin	2	1	1	0	5-25	2-28	6	3
Glen Rovers	2	1	1	0	3-31	3-25	6	3
Argideen Rangers	2	0	0	2	1-25	4-28	-12	0

==== Results ====
12 September 2020 Round 1	Meelin	2-14 - 2-14	Glen Rovers	O'Connell Park
	James Forrest 0-6 (4fs, 1 ’65), J Curtin 2-0, W Murphy, John Forrest 0-2 each, L Collins, B O’Sullivan, N Linehan, J O’Callaghan 0-1 each.	Report	E O’Connell 0-5 (3fs), C O’Sullivan 0-5 (3fs), D Busteed 1-0, L Quilligan 1-0, G Kennefick, A Evans, D Browne, S Busteed 0-1 each.

26 June 2021 Round 2	Argideen Rangers	0-14 - 3-11	Meelin	Páirc Eoin Mhic Charthaigh
	B Fleming 0-6 (f), M Lawton 0-2, S Maxwell, JM O’Callaghan (f), P Butler, E Lawton, F Butler (0-1 each).	Report	J O’Callaghan 1-2, John Forest 1-1, J Curtin 1-0, M O’Keeffe 0-2 (f), James Forrest 0-2, N Linehan 0-2, B O’Sullivan 0-2.	Referee: B Murphy (Carrigtwohill)

4 July 2021 Round 3	Glen Rovers	1-17 - 1-11	Argideen Rangers	Brinny Sportsfield
	E Murphy 0-9 (0-8 f, 0- 65), D Browne 0-4, D Kennefick 1-0, D Busteed 0-2, D Moylan, J Corkery 0-1 each.	Report	B Fleming 0-5 (4f, ’65), D O’Donovan 1-1, S Maxwell 0-2, P Butler 0-2, F Butler 0-1.	Referee: W Wallis (Aghada)

=== Playoff ===
15 July 2021 Playoff	Meelin	2-13 - 0-12	Glen Rovers	Mallow GAA Complex
	James Forrest 0-10 (0-9 f), B O'Sullivan 1-1, W Murphy 1-0, L Collins, J O'Callaghan 0-1 each.	Report	E Murphy 0-4 (0-3 f, 0-1 65), A Evans 0-4, C O'Sullivan, L Mulroy, G Marshall, D Kennefick 0-1 each.	Referee: J O'Leary (Mallow)

=== Knockout stage ===
==== Quarter-finals ====
12 September 2020 Quarter-final	Aghabullogue	1-16 - 1-14	Mayfield	Páirc Uí Rinn
	S Tarrant (0-8, 5fs), M Bradley (1-2), D Dineen (0-2), P Ring, B Casey, J Buckley, D Twomey (0-1 each).	Report	J Curtin (1-1), D O’Neill (3fs), S Duggan (0-3 each), N Kelly, S O’Donovan (0-2 each); D Lucey, D Malone, S Kelly (0-1 each).

12 September 2020 Quarter-final	Sarsfields	0-21 - 0-16	Cloughduv	Ovens
	C Duggan (0-7, 5f), E O’Sullivan (1f), K Murphy (0-5 each), S O’Driscoll, J O’Leary, P O’Driscoll, D Kenneally (0-1 each).	Report	B Verling (0-9, 6f), M Verling (0-5), M Walsh, E Curzon (0-1 each).

==== Semi-finals ====
27 September 2020 Semi-final	Éire Óg	1-20 - 1-20 (aet); Penalties: 2-0	Sarsfields	Blarney Sportsfield
	K Hallissey 0-10 (0-6 f), D Goulding 1-0, Joe Cooper, L Considine, D Desmond (f) 0-2 each, B Corcoran, John Cooper, E O’Shea (f), C O’Callaghan 0-1 each.	Report	C Duggan 1-10 (0-10 f), C Inglis, P O’Driscoll 0-3 each, E O’Sullivan 0-2, A Hackett, C McCarthy 0-1 each.

27 September 2020 Semi-final	Killdorrery	2-13 - 1-25	Aghabullogue	O'Connell Park
	P O’Brien (0-10 frees); J McEniry (1-0); E O’Connor (1-0); J Keating (sideline); D Kelly, S Fitzgerald (free) (0-1 each).	Report	S Tarrant (0-8, 4 frees), D Dineen (0-6), M Bradley (0-6), L Casey (1-1), B Casey (0-3), S Feury (0-1).

==== Final ====
7 August 2021 Final	Éire Óg	2-16 - 1-17	Aghabullogue	Páirc Uí Chaoimh
	K Hallissey (0-7, 0-4 frees, 0-1 65), D Goulding (1-1), B Corcoran (1-0), C Sheehan (0-3), C O’Callaghan and Joe Cooper (0-2 each), John Cooper (0-1).	Report	I Barry Murphy (1-3), S Tarrant (frees) and D Dineen (0-4 each), M Bradley (0-3), S Feury, P Twomey and L Casey (0-1 each).	Referee: B Murphy (Carrigtwohill)

== Championship statistics ==
=== Top scorers ===
Overall

Rank	Player	Club	Tally	Total	Matches	Average
1	Cormac Duggan	Sarsfields	4-35	47	5	9.40
2	Shane Tarrant	Aghabullogue	0-44	44	6	7.33
3	James Forrest	Meelin	0-43	43	6	7.16
4	Peter O'Brien	Kildorrery	1-38	41	4	10.25
5	Evan O'Connell	Glen Rovers	2-29	35	5	7.00
6	Matthew Bradley	Aghabullogue	1-31	34	6	5.66
6	Aaron Mulcahy	Midleton	1-31	34	3	11.33
8	Brian Verling	Cloughduv	1-28	31	4	7.75
9	John M. O'Callaghan	Argideen Rangers	1-26	29	4	7.25
10	Kevin Hallissey	Éire Óg	0-27	27	4	6.75

In a single game

Rank	Player	Club	Tally	Total	Opposition
1	Cormac Duggan	Sarsfields	3-09	18	Douglas
2	Mark Verling	Cloughduv	4-05	17	Glen Rovers
3	Peter O'Brien	Kildorrery	1-10	13	Argideen Rangers
3	Cormac Duggan	Sarsfields	1-10	13	Éire Óg
3	Aaron Mulcahy	Midleton	0-13	13	Aghabullogue
6	John M. O'Callaghan	Argideen Rangers	1-09	12	Kildorrery
6	Aaron Mulcahy	Midleton	0-12	12	Glen Rovers
8	Lar Considine	Éire Óg	2-05	11	Douglas
8	Evan O'Connell	Glen Rovers	1-08	11	Cloughduv
8	David O'Neill	Mayfield	0-11	11	Kildorrery
8	Evan O'Connell	Glen Rovers	0-11	11	Aghabullogue
8	James Forrest	Meelin	0-11	11	Douglas
