= Walter Walsh (hurler) =

Irish hurler (born 1991)

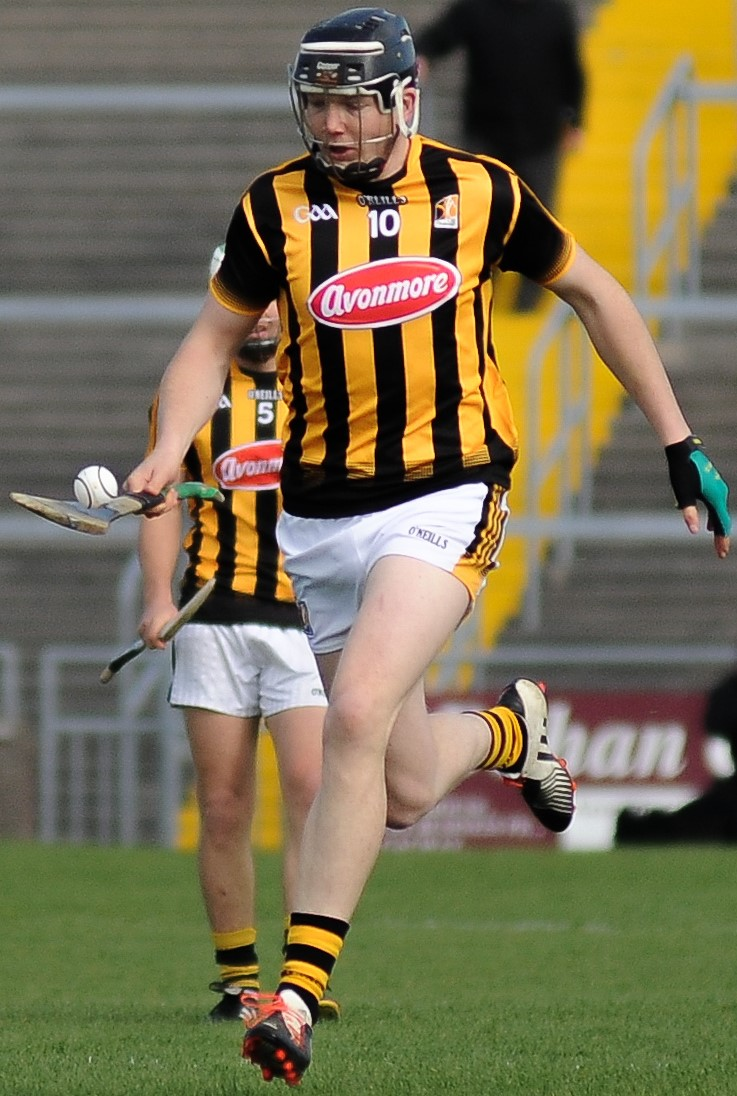

Personal information
- Native name: Ualtar Breathnach (Irish)
- Nickname: buddy
- Born: 25 May 1991 (age 35) Waterford, Ireland
- Occupation: Secondary school teacher/Dairy Farmer
- Height: 1.56 m (5 ft 1 in)

Sport
- Sport: Hurling
- Position: Centre-forward
Club
- Years: Club
- 2008-present: Tullogher–Rosbercon
Club titles
- Kilkenny titles: 0
College
- Years: College
- University College Dublin
College titles
- Fitzgibbon titles: 0
Inter-county*
| Years | County | Apps (scores) |
| 2012-2024 | Kilkenny | 41 (5-54) |
Inter-county titles
- Leinster titles: 7
- All-Irelands: 3
- NHL: 5
- All Stars: 1
- *Inter County team apps and scores correct as of 12:22, 18 February 2022.

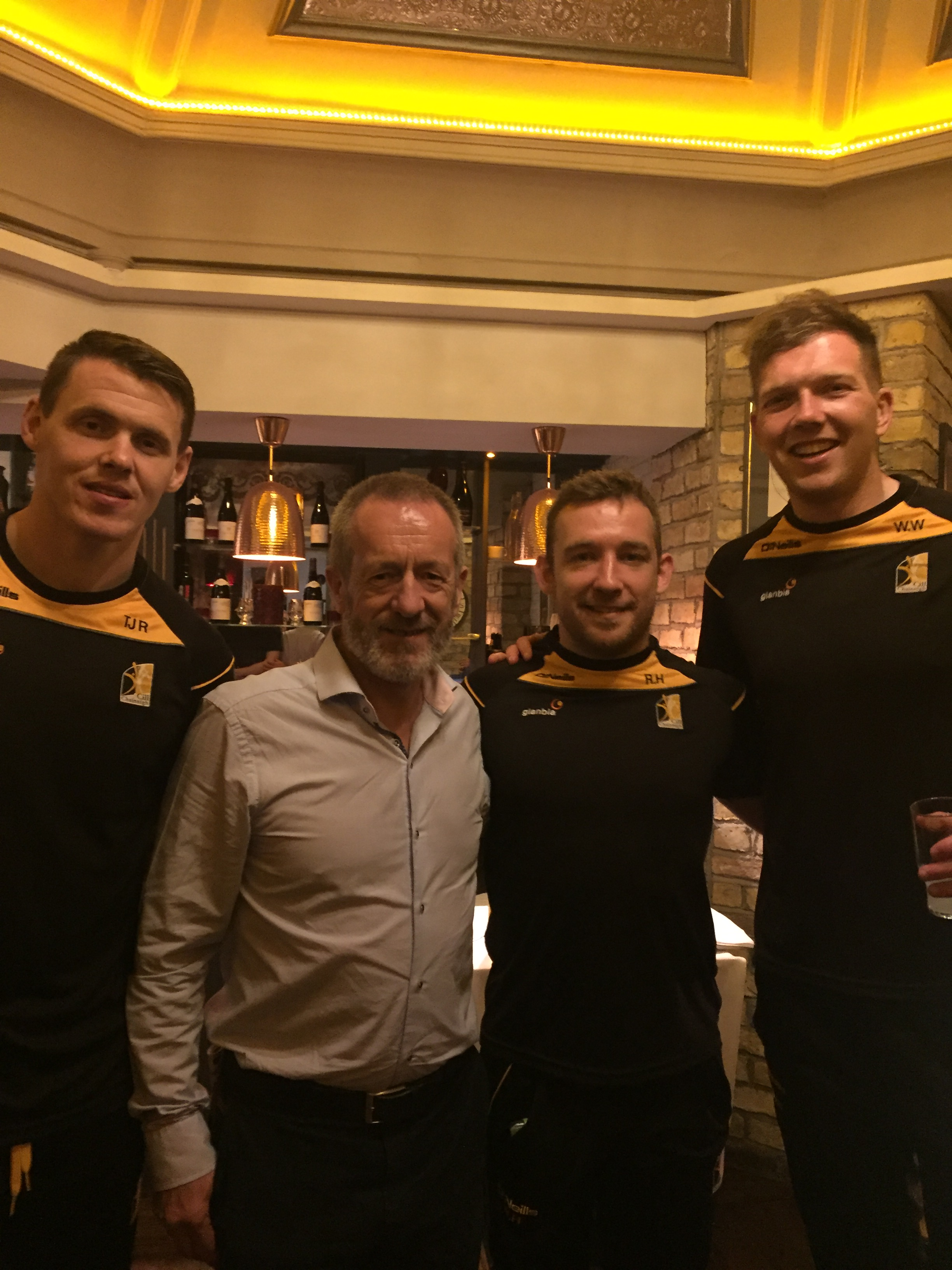
Walsh (right) with T. J. Reid, Séan Kelly and Richie Hogan

Walter Walsh (born 25 May 1991) is an Irish hurler who plays for Kilkenny Intermediate Hurling Championship club Tullogher–Rosbercon and previously at inter-county level with the Kilkenny senior hurling team. He usually lines out as a centre-forward.

== Playing career ==
=== Good Counsel College ===
Walsh played competitive hurling while at secondary school in Good Counsel College in New Ross. He played in every grade of hurling before eventually joining the school's senior hurling team. On 14 March 2009, Walsh was at midfield when Good Counsel College faced Castlecomer Community School in the Leinster Colleges final. He scored a point from play and collected a winners' medal following the 1–13 to 2–08 victory. On 13 April 2009, Walsh was at right corner-forward when Good Counsel College faced Thurles CBS in the All-Ireland Post-Primary Schools final. He scored a goal from play but ended on the losing side following the 1–17 to 1–15 defeat.

=== University College Dublin ===
As a student at University College Dublin (UCD), Walsh joined the UCD senior hurling team during his second year. He lined out in several Fitzgibbon Cup campaigns without success.

=== Tullogher–Rosbercon ===
Walsh joined the Tullogher–Rosbercon at a young age and played in all grades at juvenile and underage levels. He joined the club's top adult team when he was still eligible for the minor grade.

On 18 October 2008, Walsh was at left wing-forward when Tullogher–Rosbercon faced Piltown in the Southern Junior Championship final. He scored a point from play and collected a winners' medal following the 1–11 to 0–08 defeat of Piltown. Walsh retained his position at left wing-forward when he lined out in the Kilkenny Junior Championship final on 25 October 2008. He scored a goal in the 2–10 to 0–08 defeat of Lisdowney. Walsh won a Junior Championship medal on 30 November 2008 following Tullogher–Rosbercon's 1–19 to 3–08 defeat of Clongeen in the final. He was switched to right corner-forward for the All-Ireland final against Dripsey on 15 February 2009. After opening the scoring with a point after 30 seconds, Walsh ended on the losing side following a 2–15 to 0–18 defeat.

=== Kilkenny ===
==== Minor and under-21 ====
Walsh first played for Kilkenny as a member of the minor team during the 2008 Leinster Championship. He made his first appearance for the team on 6 July 2008 when he came on as a substitute in Kilkenny's 1–19 to 0–13 defeat of Wexford in the Leinster final. On 7 September 2008, Walsh lined out at full-forward when Kilkenny faced Galway in the All-Ireland final. He ended the game with a winners' medal following the 3–06 to 0–13 victory.

On 5 July 2009, Walsh lined out at right corner-forward when Kilkenny faced Wexford in a second successive Leinster final. He scored two points from play and collected a second Leinster Championship medal following the 1–19 to 0–11 victory. On 6 September 2009, Walsh scored a point from full-forward when Kilkenny suffered a 2–15 to 2–11 defeat by Galway in the All-Ireland final.

Walsh was drafted onto the Kilkenny under-21 for the 2010 Leinster Championship. He made his first appearance for the team on 9 June 2010 when he scored two points from full-forward in a 2–31 to 0–08 defeat of Offaly.

On 11 July 2012, Walsh won a Leinster Championship medal after scoring two points from right corner-forward in a 4–24 to 1–13 defeat of Laois in the final. He was switched to left corner-forward for the All-Ireland final against Clare on 15 September 2012. Walsh scored two points in the 2–17 to 2–11 defeat by Clare.

==== Senior ====
On 30 September 2012, made his first appearance for the Kilkenny senior team when he lined out at full-forward in the All-Ireland final replay against Galway. He scored 1-03 from play and collected a winners' medal following the 3–22 to 3–11 victory. Walsh was also named as the man of the match.

On 4 May 2014, Walsh was named on the bench when Kilkenny faced Tipperary in the National League final. He came on as a 43rd-minute substitute for Mark Kelly and collected his first winners' medal following the 2–25 to 1–27 victory. On 6 July 2014, Walsh was named on the bench for the Leinster final, however, he started the game at left wing-forward. He scored a point and collected his first Leinster Championship medal following the 0–24 to 1–09 defeat of Dublin. on 7 September 2014, Walsh lined out at left corner-forward when Kilkenny faced Tipperary in the All-Ireland final. He scored a point from play before being substituted in the 48th minute in the 3–22 to 1–28 draw. Walsh was dropped from the starting fifteen for the replay on 27 September 2014. He remained on the bench for the entire game but collected a second All-Ireland medal as a non-playing substitute following the 2–17 to 2–14 victory.

On 5 July 2015, Walsh was at midfield when Kilkenny faced Galway in the Leinster final. He scored two points and collected his second successive winners' medal following the 1–25 to 2–15 victory. On 6 September 2015, Walsh was named at right wing-forward for the All-Ireland final against Galway but spent much of the game at full-forward. He scored two points from play and collected his third All-Ireland medal following the 1–22 to 1–18 victory.

Walsh lined out in a third successive Leinster final on 3 July 2016. He scored two points from right wing-forward and collected his third winners' medal following a 1–26 to 0–22 defeat of Galway. Walsh retained his position at right wing-forward for the All-Ireland final against Tipperary on 4 September 2016. He scored a point from play but ended on the losing side following the 2–29 to 2–20 defeat. Walsh ended the season by being named in the right wing-forward position on the All-Star team.

On 8 April 2018, Walsh was selected at full-forward when Kilkenny faced Tipperary in the National League final. He scored 1-02 from play and collected a second winners' medal following the 2–23 to 2–17 victory. Walsh was selected at full-forward when Kilkenny faced Galway in the Leinster final on 1 July 2018. He scored a point from play in the 0-18 apiece draw. He retained his position for the replay a week later, however, he was substituted in the 16th minute after sustaining an injury in the 1–28 to 3–15 defeat.

On 30 June 2019, Walsh lined out at centre-forward when Kilkenny faced Wexford in the Leinster final. He scored two points from play but ended on the losing side following the 1–23 to 0–23 defeat.

In November 2024, Walsh announced his retirement from inter-county hurling.

=== Leinster ===
Walsh was drafted onto the Leinster inter-provincial team during the 2014 Interprovincial Championship. He made his first appearance for the team on 1 March 2014 and collected a Railway Cup medal after scoring a point from right corner-forward in the 1–23 to 0–16 defeat of Connacht.

On 15 December 2016, Walsh lined out at right corner-forward when Leinster faced Munster in the final. He scored four points from play but ended on the losing side following a 2–20 to 2–16 defeat.

== Career statistics ==
As of 13 February 2022.

| Team | Year | National League | | | Leinster | | All-Ireland | | Total | |
| Team | Year | Division | Apps | Score | Apps | Score | Apps | Score | Apps | Score |
|---|---|---|---|---|---|---|---|---|---|---|
| Kilkenny | 2012 | Division 1A | 0 | 0-00 | 0 | 0-00 | 1 | 1-03 | 1 | 1-03 |
| Kilkenny | 2013 | Division 1A | 3 | 0-00 | 3 | 1-06 | 3 | 0-04 | 9 | 1-10 |
| Kilkenny | 2014 | Division 1A | 8 | 1-17 | 4 | 0-05 | 1 | 0-01 | 13 | 1-23 |
| Kilkenny | 2015 | Division 1A | 6 | 0-10 | 2 | 0-02 | 2 | 0-02 | 10 | 0-14 |
| Kilkenny | 2016 | Division 1A | 7 | 0-10 | 2 | 0-04 | 3 | 1-03 | 12 | 1-17 |
| Kilkenny | 2017 | Division 1A | 6 | 0-08 | 1 | 0-01 | 2 | 0-04 | 9 | 0-13 |
| Kilkenny | 2018 | Division 1A | 8 | 3-13 | 4 | 1-05 | 0 | 0-00 | 12 | 4-18 |
| Kilkenny | 2019 | Division 1A | 3 | 0-03 | 4 | 0-05 | 3 | 0-06 | 10 | 0-14 |
| Kilkenny | 2020 | Division 1B | 4 | 0-07 | 2 | 0-02 | 1 | 0-00 | 7 | 0-09 |
| Kilkenny | 2021 | Division 1B | 1 | 0-01 | 2 | 1-01 | 1 | 0-00 | 4 | 1-02 |
| Kilkenny | 2022 | Division 1B | 2 | 0-02 | 0 | 0-00 | 0 | 0-00 | 2 | 0-02 |
| Total | | | 48 | 4-71 | 24 | 3-31 | 17 | 2-23 | 89 | 9-125 |

== Honours ==
Good Counsel College

- Leinster Colleges Senior Hurling Championship: 2009

Tullogher–Rosbercon

- Kilkenny Intermediate Football Championship: 2018
- All-Ireland Junior Club Hurling Championship 2024
- Leinster Junior Club Hurling Championship: 2008, 2023
- Kilkenny Premier Junior Hurling Championship: 2008, 2023
- Kilkenny Junior Football Championship: 2016
- Southern Junior Hurling Championship: 2008

Kilkenny

- All-Ireland Senior Hurling Championship: 2012, 2014, 2015
- Leinster Senior Hurling Championship: 2014, 2015, 2016, 2020, 2021, 2022, 2023, 2024
- National Hurling League: 2012, 2013, 2014, 2018, 2021
- Leinster Intermediate Hurling Championship: 2009
- Leinster Under-21 Hurling Championship: 2012
- All-Ireland Minor Hurling Championship: 2008
- Leinster Minor Hurling Championship: 2008, 2009

Leinster

- Railway Cup: 2014

Awards

- All-Stars: 2016

Awards
| Preceded by Iarla Tannian | All-Ireland Senior Hurling Final; Man of the Match; 2012 (replay) | Succeeded by Conor Ryan |
