= 1938 Cork Intermediate Hurling Championship =

Irish hurling competition

- Champions: Blarney (1st title)
- Runners-up: Éire Óg

The 1938 Cork Intermediate Hurling Championship was the 29th staging of the Cork Intermediate Hurling Championship since its establishment by the Cork County Board in 1909.

Blarney entered the championship as the defending champions.

The final was played on 2 October 1938 at the Athletic Grounds in Cork, between Blarney and Éire Óg, in what was their second consecutive meeting in the final. Blarney won the match by 1–04 to 1–00 to claim their second championship title overall and a second championship title in succession.

== Results ==
=== Final ===
2 October 1938 Final	Blarney	1-04 - 1-00	Éire Óg	Cork Athletic Grounds
