= Peter Kelleher =

Peter Kelleher may refer to:

- Peter Kelleher (Gaelic footballer) (born 1995), Irish Gaelic footballer
- Peter Kelleher (politician) (born 1946), Irish politician
