= Gleann na Laoi GAA =

Gaelic games club in County Cork, Ireland

Gleann na Laoi
- Gleann na Laoi
- Founded: 1939
- County: Cork
- Colours
- Grounds: Ballycannon Park

Playing kits
Standard colours

Gleann na Laoi GAA is a Gaelic Athletic Association club in Kerry Pike, County Cork, Ireland. The club is affiliated to the Muskerry Board and the Cork County Board and fields teams in both hurling and Gaelic football.

== History ==
Located in the Kerry Pike and Clogheen areas, about 5 miles from Cork, Gleann na Laoi GAA Club was founded in 1939. The club has spent its entire existence operating in the junior grades, while it has also experienced periods where the club went out of existence due to a scarcity of players. Gleann na Laoi reached the final of the Mid Cork JFC final for the first time, however, they were beaten by Donoughmore by 2–03 to 1–01. It would by 1993 before Gleann na Laoi reached another decider, this time the Mid Cork JAHC final, however, they were beaten by Blarney.

== Honours ==
- Mid Cork Junior A Football Championship (0): Runners-up 1952
- Mid Cork Junior A Hurling Championship (0): Runners-up 1993
