= 1977 Cork Junior Hurling Championship =

Irish hurling competition

- Teams: 7
- Champions: Éire Óg (2nd title)
- Runners-up: Erin's Own

The 1977 Cork Junior Hurling Championship was the 80th staging of the Cork Junior Hurling Championship since its establishment by the Cork County Board.

On 11 December 1977, Éire Óg won the championship following a 2–08 to 1–09 defeat of Erin's Own in the final at Páirc Uí Chaoimh in Cork. It was their second championship title overall and their first title in 15 years.

== Results ==
=== Final ===
| 11 December 1977 Final | Éire Óg | 2-08 - 1-09 | Erin's Own | Moore Park |
