= Mid Cork Junior A Hurling Championship =

Annual hurling competition

- Code: Hurling
- Founded: 1925; 101 years ago
- Region: Muskerry (GAA)
- No. of teams: 11
- Title holders: Donoughmore (1st title)
- Most titles: Cloughduv (25 titles)
- Sponsors: MJK Oils
- Official website: Muskerry GAA

The Mid Cork Junior A Hurling Championship (known for sponsorship reasons as the MJK Oils Junior A Hurling Championship) is an annual club hurling competition organised by the Mid Cork Board of the Gaelic Athletic Association and contested by the top-ranking junior clubs in the Muskerry region in County Cork, Ireland, deciding the competition winners through a group stage and knockout format. It is the most prestigious competition in Mid Cork hurling.

Introduced in 1925, it was initially a straight-knockout tournament. The competition went through a number of format changes since then, including the introduction of a back-door or second chance for beaten teams.

In its current format, the Mid Cork Junior A Championship begins with a group stage in late summer. The 10 participating teams are divided into two groups of five and play each other in a round-robin system. The two top-ranking teams in each group proceed to the knockout phase that culminates with the final. The winner of the Mid Cork Junior Championship also qualifies for the subsequent Cork Junior A Hurling Championship.

The competition has been won by 11 different teams, nine of which have won it more than once. Cloughduv are the most successful team in the tournament's history, having won it 25 times. Donoughmore are the title holders after defeating Dripsey by 1–20 to 1–18 in the 2026 final.

== Format ==
=== Group stage ===
The 9 teams are divided into three groups of three. Over the course of the group stage, each team plays once against the others in the group, resulting in each team being guaranteed at least two games. Two points are awarded for a win, one for a draw and zero for a loss. The teams are ranked in the group stage table by points gained, then scoring difference and then their head-to-head record. The top two teams in each group qualify for the knockout stage.

=== Knockout stage ===
Quarter-finals: Two lone quarter-finals featuring the four lowest-placed qualifying teams from the group stage. Two teams qualify for the next round.

Semi-finals: The two quarter-final winners and the top two highest-placed qualifying teams from the group stage contest this round. The two winners from these games advance to the final.

Final: The two semi-final winners contest the final. The winning team are declared champions.

== Teams ==
=== 2026 Teams ===
The 11 teams competing in the 2026 Mid Cork Junior A Hurling Championship are:

| Team | Location | Colours | Position in 2026 | In championship since | Championship Titles | Last Championship Title |
|---|---|---|---|---|---|---|
| Aghabullogue | Coachford | Green and white | Group stage | 2025 | 16 | 1998 |
| Ballincollig | Ballincollig | Green and white | Group stage | ? | 5 | 1990 |
| Ballinora | Ballinora | Green and red | Group stage | ? | 11 | 2025 |
| Blarney | Blarney | Red and white | Group stage | ? | 13 | 1993 |
| Donoughmore | Donoughmore | Black and white | Champions | ? | 1 | 2026 |
| Dripsey | Dripsey | Red and blue | Runners-up | 2023 | 1 | 2008 |
| Éire Óg | Ovens | Red and white | Group stage | ? | 7 | 1977 |
| Grenagh | Grenagh | Blue and gold | Semi-finals | 2022 | 11 | 2013 |
| Inniscarra | Inniscarra | Blue and white | Semi-finals | 2019 | 9 | 2020 |
| Kilmichael | Kilmichael | Blue and gold | Group stage | 2012 | 0 | — |
| Uíbh Laoire | Inchigeelagh | Red and white | Group stage | 2026 | 0 | — |

== Qualification for subsequent competitions ==
The Mid Cork Junior A Championship winners qualify for the subsequent Cork Junior A Hurling Championship.

== Roll of honour ==
=== By club ===
| # | Club | Titles | Runners-up | Championship wins | Championship runner-up |
|---|---|---|---|---|---|
| 1 | Cloughduv | 25 | 10 | 1933, 1938, 1939, 1940, 1948, 1950, 1951, 1953, 1956, 1957, 1959, 1964, 1967, 1970, 1994, 2002, 2006, 2009, 2010, 2011, 2014, 2015, 2017, 2018, 2019 | 1929, 1944, 1949, 1953, 1961, 1963, 1965, 2004, 2012, 2016 |
| 2 | Aghabullogue | 16 | 7 | 1937, 1949, 1952, 1954, 1955, 1973, 1974, 1976, 1981, 1983, 1984, 1986, 1988, 1989, 1991, 1998 | 1938, 1940, 1975, 1977, 1978, 1980, 2000 |
| 3 | Blarney | 13 | 17 | 1931, 1934, 1936, 1943, 1944, 1946, 1969, 1978, 1979, 1980, 1985, 1992, 1993 | 1939, 1947, 1948, 1951, 1955, 1968, 1971, 1972, 1976, 1984, 1988, 1989, 1990, 1991, 2002, 2005, 2015 |
| 4 | Grenagh | 12 | 9 | 1958, 1966, 1995, 1999, 2000, 2001, 2003, 2004, 2005, 2007, 2012, 2013 | 1945, 1946, 1954, 1964, 1967, 2010, 2011, 2022, 2025 |
| 5 | Ballinora | 11 | 10 | 1928, 1929, 1982, 1996, 1997, 2016, 2021, 2022, 2023, 2024, 2025 | 1927, 1979, 1981, 1987, 1995, 1998, 1999, 2006, 2018, 2020 |
| 6 | Inniscarra | 9 | 14 | 1935, 1941, 1942, 1945, 1947, 1965, 1968, 1975, 2020 | 1937, 1956, 1957, 1966, 1969, 1970, 1982, 1983, 1985, 1992, 1996, 1997, 2009, 2021 |
| 7 | Éire Óg | 7 | 8 | 1930, 1960, 1961, 1962, 1971, 1972, 1977 | 1928, 1932, 1941, 1950, 1958, 1973, 1974, 2019 |
| 8 | Ballincollig | 5 | 8 | 1927, 1932, 1963, 1987, 1990 | 1942, 1959, 1960, 1962, 1986, 1994, 2003, 2024 |
| 9 | Bride Valley | 2 | 0 | 1925, 1926 | — |
| 10 | Donoughmore | 1 | 7 | 2026 | 1933, 1935, 1943, 1952, 2001, 2008, 2013 |
| 10 | Dripsey | 1 | 3 | 2008 | 2007, 2023, 2026 |
| 12 | Shournagh Valley | 0 | 2 | — | 1934, 1936 |
| 12 | Kilmichael | 0 | 2 | — | 2014, 2017 |
| 12 | Gleann na Laoi | 0 | 1 | — | 1993 |

=== Notes ===
- 1925, 1926, 1930 and 1931 runners-up are unknown

== List of finals ==
=== List of Mid Cork JAHC finals (1925–present) ===
| Year | Winners | | Runners-up | | # |
| Year | Club | Score | Club | Score | # |
|---|---|---|---|---|---|
| 2026 | Donoughmore | 1–20 | Dripsey | 1–18 | |
| 2025 | Ballinora | 0-22 | Grenagh | 1-11 | |
| 2024 | Ballinora | 1-08, 1-16 | Ballincollig | 2-05, 1-13 | |
| 2023 | Ballinora | 0-15 | Dripsey | 1-09 | |
| 2022 | Ballinora | 0-16 | Grenagh | 0-11 | |
| 2021 | Ballinora | 0-17 | Inniscarra | 1-10 | |
| 2020 | Inniscarra | 1-18 | Ballinora | 1-15 | |
| 2019 | Cloughduv | 1-11 | Éire Óg | 0-11 | |
| 2018 | Cloughduv | 2-23 | Ballinora | 0-09 | |
| 2017 | Cloughduv | 1-22 | Kilmichael | 1-13 | |
| 2016 | Ballinora | 1-15 | Blarney | 2-10 | |
| 2015 | Cloughduv | 0-20 | Blarney | 0-09 | |
| 2014 | Cloughduv | 1-16 | Kilmichael | 1-09 | |
| 2013 | Grenagh | 2-18 | Donoughmore | 1-09 | |
| 2012 | Grenagh | 1-15 | Cloughduv | 2-11 | |
| 2011 | Cloughduv | 2-12 | Grenagh | 1-14 | |
| 2010 | Cloughduv | 1-11 | Grenagh | 0-11 | |
| 2009 | Cloughduv | 4-10 | Inniscarra | 0-13 | |
| 2008 | Dripsey | 4-15 | Donoughmore | 2-10 | |
| 2007 | Grenagh | 1-15, 2-14 (R) | Dripsey | 2-12, 2-07 (R) | |
| 2006 | Cloughduv | 2-14 | Ballinora | 1-09 | |
| 2005 | Grenagh | 2-11 | Blarney | 1-07 | |
| 2004 | Grenagh | 0-19 | Cloughduv | 3-09 | |
| 2003 | Grenagh | 1-14 | Ballincollig | 2-09 | |
| 2002 | Cloughduv | 2-13 | Blarney | 3-08 | |
| 2001 | Grenagh | 3-15 | Donoughmore | 2-10 | |
| 2000 | Grenagh | 2-12 | Aghabullogue | 1-06 | |
| 1999 | Grenagh | | Ballinora | | |
| 1998 | Aghabullogue | | Ballinora | | |
| 1997 | Ballinora | | Inniscarra | | |
| 1996 | Ballinora | | Inniscarra | | |
| 1995 | Grenagh | | Ballinora | | |
| 1994 | Cloughduv | | Ballincollig | | |
| 1993 | Blarney | | Gleann na Laoi | | |
| 1992 | Blarney | | Inniscarra | | |
| 1991 | Aghabullogue | | Ballincollig | | |
| 1990 | Ballincollig | | Blarney | | |
| 1989 | Aghabullogue | | Blarney | | |
| 1988 | Aghabullogue | | Blarney | | |
| 1987 | Ballincollig | | Ballinora | | |
| 1986 | Aghabullogue | | Ballincollig | | |
| 1985 | Blarney | | Inniscarra | | |
| 1984 | Aghabullogue | | Blarney | | |
| 1983 | Aghabullogue | | Inniscarra | | |
| 1982 | Ballinora | | Inniscarra | | |
| 1981 | Aghabullogue | | Ballinora | | |
| 1980 | Blarney | | Aghabullogue | | |
| 1979 | Blarney | | Ballinora | | |
| 1978 | Blarney | | Aghabullogue | | |
| 1977 | Éire Óg | | Aghabullogue | | |
| 1976 | Aghabullogue | | Blarney | | |
| 1975 | Inniscarra | | Aghabullogue | | |
| 1974 | Aghabullogue | | Éire Óg | | |
| 1973 | Aghabullogue | | Éire Óg | | |
| 1972 | Éire Óg | | Blarney | | |
| 1971 | Éire Óg | | Blarney | | |
| 1970 | Cloughduv | | Inniscarra | | |
| 1969 | Blarney | | Inniscarra | | |
| 1968 | Inniscarra | | Blarney | | |
| 1967 | Cloughduv | | Grenagh | | |
| 1966 | Grenagh | | Inniscarra | | |
| 1965 | Inniscarra | | Cloughduv | | |
| 1964 | Cloughduv | | Grenagh | | |
| 1963 | Ballincollig | | Cloughduv | | |
| 1962 | Éire Óg | | Ballincollig | | |
| 1961 | Éire Óg | | Cloughduv | | |
| 1960 | Éire Óg | | Ballincollig | | |
| 1959 | Cloughduv | | Ballincollig | | |
| 1958 | Grenagh | | Éire Óg | | |
| 1957 | Cloughduv | | Inniscarra | | |
| 1956 | Cloughduv | | Inniscarra | | |
| 1955 | Aghabullogue | | Blarney | | |
| 1954 | Aghabullogue | | Grenagh | | |
| 1953 | Cloughduv | | Inniscarra | | |
| 1952 | Aghabullogue | | Donoughmore | | |
| 1951 | Cloughduv | | Blarney | | |
| 1950 | Cloughduv | | Éire Óg | | |
| 1949 | Aghabullogue | | Cloughduv | | |
| 1948 | Cloughduv | | Blarney | | |
| 1947 | Inniscarra | | Blarney | | |
| 1946 | Blarney | | Grenagh | | |
| 1945 | Inniscarra | | Grenagh | | |
| 1944 | Blarney | | Cloughduv | | |
| 1943 | Blarney | | Donoughmore | | |
| 1942 | Inniscarra | | Ballincollig | | |
| 1941 | Inniscarra Valley | | Éire Óg | | |
| 1940 | Cloughduv | | Aghabullogue | | |
| 1939 | Cloughduv | | Blarney | | |
| 1938 | Cloughduv | | Aghabullogue | | |
| 1937 | Aghabullogue | | Inniscarra | | |
| 1936 | Blarney | | Shournagh Valley | | |
| 1935 | Inniscarra | | Donoughmore | | |
| 1934 | Blarney | | Shournagh Valley | | |
| 1933 | Cloughduv | | Donoughmore | | |
| 1932 | Ballincollig | | Éire Óg | | |
| 1931 | Blarney | | | | |
| 1930 | Éire Óg | | | | |
| 1929 | Ballinora | | Cloughduv | | |
| 1928 | Ballinora | | Éire Óg | | |
| 1927 | Ballincollig | | Ballinora | | |
| 1926 | Bridevalley | | | | |
| 1925 | Bridevalley | | | | |

== Records and statistics ==
=== Teams ===
==== By decade ====
The most successful team of each decade, judged by the number of Mid Cork Junior A Hurling Championship titles, is as follows:

- 1920s: 2 each for Bride Valley (1925–26) and Ballinora (1928–29)
- 1930s: 3 each for Blarney (1931-34-36) and Cloughduv (1933-38-39)
- 1940s: 4 for Inniscarra (1941-42-45-47)
- 1950s: 6 for Cloughduv (1950-51-53-56-57-59)
- 1960s: 3 for Éire Óg (1960-61-62)
- 1970s: 3 each for Éire Óg (1971-72-77) and Aghabullogue (1973-74-76)
- 1980s: 6 for Aghabullogue (1981-83-84-86-88-89)
- 1990s: 2 each for Aghabullogue (1991–98), Blarney (1992–93), Grenagh (1995–99) and Ballinora (1996–97)
- 2000s: 6 for Grenagh (2000-01-03-04-05-07)
- 2010s: 7 for Cloughduv (2010-11-14-15-17-18-19)
- 2020s: 5 for Ballinora (2021-22-23-24-25)

==== Gaps ====
Top ten longest gaps between successive championship titles:

- 53 years: Ballinora (1929-1982)
- 45 years: Inniscarra (1975-2020)
- 31 years: Ballincollig (1932-1963)
- 30 years: Éire Óg (1930-1960)
- 29 years: Grenagh (1966-1995)
- 24 years: Ballincollig (1963-1987)
- 24 years: Cloughduv (1970-1994)
- 23 years: Blarney (1946-1969)
- 19 years: Ballinora (1997-2016)
- 18 years: Aghabullogue (1955-1973)

== See also ==
- Mid Cork Junior A Football Championship
