= 2014 Cork Intermediate Football Championship =

Gaelic football competition

- Sponsor: Evening Echo
- Champions: Éire Óg (1st title); Dermot Herlihy (captain); Harry O'Reilly (manager)
- Runners-up: Rockchapel; Brendan Cahill (captain); Séamus Cooper (manager)

The 2014 Cork Intermediate Football Championship was the 79th staging of the Cork Intermediate Football Championship since its establishment by the Cork County Board in 1909.

The final was played on 25 October 2014 at Páirc Uí Rinn in Cork, between Éire Óg and Rockchapel, in what was their first ever meeting in the final. Éire Óg won the match by 0–14 to 0–06 to claim their first ever championship title.

== Results ==
=== Semi-finals ===
4 October 2014 Semi-final	Rockchapel	2-07 - 1-07	Cill na Martra	Cullen Grounds
	DJ O'Sullivan 1-1, I Guiney 1-0, S Hickey 0-3, J Forrest 0-1, W Murphy 0-1; L Collins 0-1f.	Report	C Ó hUidhir 0-3 (0-2f), M Ó Deasúna 0-1f, C Ó Suilleabháin 0-1, S Ó Loingsigh 0-1; M Ó Conchúir 0-1.

18 October 2014 Semi-final	Éire Óg	0-09 - 1-03	Fermoy	Páirc Uí Rinn
	D Goulding 0-4 (1f), J Dineen 0-3, R O'Toole 0-1, L Sheehan 0-1.	Report	K Dorgan 1-0, R O'Hagan 0-3 (2f).

=== Final ===
25 October 2014 Final	Éire Óg	0-14 - 0-06	Rockchapel	Páirc Uí Rinn
	D Goulding 0-6 (one free, one 45), J Dineen (frees), L Sheehan 0-2 each, R Dennehy, K Hallissey, D O’Connor, R O’Toole 0-1 each.	Report	L Collins 0-2 (one free), I Guiney, S Hickey, J Forrest, W Murphy 0-1 each.
