= 2008 Cork Junior A Football Championship =

- Dates: 20 September – 19 October 2008
- Teams: 8
- Sponsor: Evening Echo
- Champions: Éire Óg (1st title); Barry Corkery (captain); Tom Scally (manager)
- Runners-up: Ballygarvan

Tournament statistics
- Matches played: 7
- Goals scored: 11 (1.57 per match)
- Points scored: 133 (19 per match)
- Top scorer(s): Daniel Goulding (0-18)

The 2008 Cork Junior A Football Championship was the 110th staging of the Cork Junior A Football Championship since its establishment by Cork County Board in 1895. The competition ran from 20 September to 19 October 2008.

The final was played on 19 October 2008 at Páirc Uí Rinn in Cork, between Éire Óg and Ballygarvan, in what was their first ever meeting in the final. Éire Óg won the match by 1–08 to 1–05 to claim their first ever championship title.

Daniel Goulding was the championship's top scorer with 0–18,

== Results ==
=== Quarter-finals ===
20 September 2008 Quarter-final	Cloyne	0-11 - 0-10	White's Cross	Carraig na bhFear Grounds
	C O'Sullivan 0-5, K O'Lomasney 0-3, P O'Sullivan 0-2, J Nyhan 0-1.	Report	M Kelleher 0-2, C Kelleher 0-2, K Buckley 0-2, E Buckley 0-2, S Kiely 0-1, P O'Sullivan 0-1.

20 September 2008 Quarter-final	Glanworth	0-12 - 0-07	Urhan	Uíbh Laoire Grounds
	M Sheehan 0-4, F Fitzgibbon 0-3, S Finn 0-2, B Gallagher 0-1, T Pierce 0-1, M Pierce 0-1.	Report	C Harrington 0-4, G Lowney 0-2, J Healy 0-1.

28 September 2009 Quarter-final	Ballygarvan	2-08 - 0-11	Cullen	Coachford Sportsfield
	G WHite 0-4, PJ Mac Gearailt 1-0, D Sweeney 1-0, D O'Sullivan 0-2, C O'Sullivan 0-1, J Spillane 0-1.		G O'Leary 0-3, A O'Regan 0-2, D O'Sullivan 0-2, I Dineen 0-1, A Lynch 0-1, C Moynihan 0-1, M Fleming 0-1.

4 October 2008 Quarter-final	Éire Óg	2-11 - 0-06	Bandon	Páirc Naomh Eoin
	D Goulding 0-6, B o'Neill 1-0, V Fahy 1-0, D O'Herlihy 0-2, C Sheehan 0-2, A O'Connor 0-1.		R Moloney 0-2, A Johnson 0-1, D Lucey 0-1, D Crowley 0-1, D Ahern 0-1.

=== Semi-finals ===
4 October 2008 Semi-final	Glanworth	1-06 - 1-12	Ballygarvan	Mallow GAA Complex
	M Pierce 1-0, F Fitzgibbon 0-3, M Sheehan 0-3.		G White 0-4, P O'Sullivan 1-0, J Spillane 0-2, C Ó Conchúir 0-2, S White 0-2, K Ashman 0-1, PJ Mac Gearailt 0-1.

11 October 2008 Semi-final	Éire Óg	0-16 - 1-10	Cloyne	Páirc Liam Mhic Cárthaigh
	D Goulding 0-7, D O'Herlihy 0-3, B O'Neill 0-3, C Sheehan 0-2, T O'Leary 0-1.		J Nyhan 1-1, K O'Lomasney 0-3, Paudie O'Sullivan 0-3, C O'Sullivan 0-2, Diarmuid O'Sullivan 0-1.

=== Final ===
19 October 2008 Final	Éire Óg	1-08 - 1-05	Ballygarvan	Páirc Uí Rinn
	C Sheehan 1-2, D Goulding 0-5, A O'Connor 0-1.		G White 1-2, C Ó Conchúir 0-2, D O'Regan 0-1.

== Championship statistics ==
=== Top scorers ===
Rank	Player	Club	Tally	Total	Matches	Average
1	Daniel Goulding	Éire Óg	0-18	18	3	6.00
2	Gary White	Ballygarvan	1-10	13	3	4.33
3	Ciarán Sheehan	Éire Óg	1-06	9	3	3.00
