= 1937 Cork Intermediate Hurling Championship =

Irish hurling competition

- Champions: Blarney (1st title)
- Runners-up: Éire Óg

The 1937 Cork Intermediate Hurling Championship was the 28th staging of the Cork Intermediate Hurling Championship since its establishment by the Cork County Board in 1909.

The final was played on 14 November 1937 at Coachford Sportsfield, between Blarney and Éire Óg, in what was their first ever meeting in the final. Blarney won the match by 4–05 to 3–02 to claim their firste ever championship title.

== Results ==
=== Final ===
14 November 1937 Final	Blarney	4-05 – 3-02	Éire Óg	Coachford Sportsfield
