= 1985 Cork Intermediate Hurling Championship =

Irish hurling competition

- Dates: 12 May 1985 – 18 August 1985
- Teams: 20
- Champions: Éire Óg (1st title); Mick Malone (captain)
- Runners-up: Blackrock

Tournament statistics
- Matches played: 20
- Goals scored: 79 (3.95 per match)
- Points scored: 391 (19.55 per match)
- Top scorer(s): Pat Walsh (5-10)

The 1985 Cork Intermediate Hurling Championship was the 76th staging of the Cork Intermediate Hurling Championship since its establishment by the Cork County Board in 1909. The draw for the opening round fixtures took place on 27 January 1985. The championship began on 12 May 1985 and ended on 18 August 1985.

On 18 August 1985, Éire Óg won the championship following a 0–14 to 2–07 defeat of Blackrock in the final at Riverstown Sportsfield. This was their second championship title overall and their first title since 1979.

Pat Walsh was the championship's top scorer with 5–10.

== Results ==
=== First round ===
12 May 1985 First round	Newtownshandrum	0-08 - 4-16	Bandon	Coachford Sportsfield
	D Coughlan 0-4, M Thompson 0-1, D Coughlan 0-1, C Connell 0-1, D Morrissey 0-1.		P Crowley 2-12, N Crowley 1-2, M Kelly 1-1, C Daly 0-1.

12 May 1985 First round	Castletownroche	1-11 - 3-05	Cloughduv	Páirc Uí Chaoimh
	Dave Relihan 0-6, M Hazelwood 1-0, E Walsh 0-1, J Power 0-1, W Magner 0-1, K McSweeney 0-1, N Flynn 0-1.		T Barry-Murphy 1-1, M Ring 1-0, G Murphy 1-0, D O'Leary 0-2, T Riordan 0-1, R Lynch 0-1.

26 May 1985 First round	St. Finbarr's	1-06 - 2-13	Tracton	Carrigaline
	N Murphy 1-0, M Kennedy 0-3, D Scanlon 0-2, F Scannell 0-1.		F Canty 1-4, K Kingston 1-3, DJ Kiely 0-4, M Quinn 0-1, L Kelly 0-1.

1 June 1985 First round	St. Vincent's	0-09 - 6-14	Inniscarra	Blarney
	W McCarthy 0-3, T Kelly 0-2, T Virgo 0-2, J Hartigan 0-1, W Daly 0-1.		G Manley 3-3, J Riordan 3-0, P O'Connell 0-3, G O'Mahony 0-3, J Feeney 0-2, J O'Leary 0-1, P Maher 0-1, M O'Donovan 0-1.

1 June 1985 First round replay	Castletownroche	1-12 - 2-05	Cloughduv	Páirc Uí Chaoimh
	Dave Relihan 1-5, M Magnier 0-2, K McSweeney 0-2, W Magnier 0-1, W Walsh 0-1, F Fallon 0-1.		L Leahy 1-0, L Lynch 1-0, D O'Leary 0-2, G Buckley 0-2, N Downes 0-1.

=== Second round ===
12 May 1985 Second round	Mallow	0-09 - 1-13	Midleton	Moore Park
	T Coakley 0-3, E Carey 0-2, J Hayes 0-1, P Lawton 0-1, J Buckley 0-1, P Shine 0-1.		K Coakley 1-4, G Fitzgerald 0-3, L Williams 0-2, M O'Mahony 0-2, E Harty 0-1, A Goldspring 0-1.

12 May 1985 Second round	Éire Óg	4-15 - 3-12	Passage	Carrigaline
	J O'Leary 1-3, M Flynn 1-2, M Kelleher 1-2, D Desmond 0-5, C Malone 1-0, M Malone 0-1, G Murphy 0-1.		B Meade 2-2, T O'Neill 1-0, P O'Sullivan 0-3, J O'Neill 0-3, G Hanley 0-2, J O'Sullivan 0-1, K Harrington 0-1.

18 May 1995 Second round	Mayfield	2-07 - 3-08	Douglas	Church Road
	A Murphy 0-5, M Walsh 1-0, M O'Grady 1-0, S Hurley 0-1, J Nodwell 0-1.		N Delea 2-1, P Walsh 1-1, E Forde 0-2, P Daly 0-2, J Horgan 0-1, T Hurley 0-1.

1 June 1985 Second round	Blackrock	2-09 - 1-10	Nemo Rangers	Páirc Uí Chaoimh
	M Kilcoyne 1-3, T Ahern 1-0, D Buckley 0-1, J Evans 0-1, P O'Neill 0-1, O Kavanagh 0-1, M Lyons 0-1, P Hayes 0-1.		S Hayes 1-2, F Golden 0-3, J Barry 0-2, B Sheehan 0-1, S Coughlan 0-1, D Murphy 0-1.

1 June 1985 Second round	St. Catherine's	1-10 - 3-10	Bishopstown	Erin's Own Grounds
	C Clancy 1-1, D Walsh 0-3, P Clancy 0-3, M Mellerick 0-1, D O'Neill 0-1, J Murphy 0-1.		J Crowley 1-1, G O'Sullivan 1-1, B O'Driscoll 1-0, C Coffey 0-2, L Jones 0-2, B Murphy 0-2, E Murphy 0-1, G McCarthy 0-1.

2 June 1985 Second round	Newcestown	2-08 - 3-10	Ballinhassig	Innishannon Sportsfield
	D O'Leary 1-2, T Crowley 1-1, E Kenneally 0-3, G Long 0-1, P Kenneally 0-1.		S McCarthy 0-6, P Cussen 1-1, C Cottrell 1-1, B Coleman 1-1, D McCarthy 0-1.

23 June 1985 Second round	Bandon	2-07 - 3-09	Castletownroche	Páirc Uí Chaoimh
	P Crowley 0-4, P Desmond 1-0, G O'Sullivan 1-0, R Wilmot 0-1, N Crowley 0-1, P O'Donovan 0-1.		Dan Relihan 2-2, K McSweeney 1-0, Dave Relihan 0-2, W Walsh 0-2, J Power 0-1.

23 June 1985 Second round	Inniscarra	1-10 - 0-05	Tracton	Ballinora
	G Manley 0-4, J Feeney 1-0, G O'Mahony 0-2, P O'Connell 0-2, P Maher 0-1, J Riordan 0-1.		M Quinn 0-3, DJ Kiely 0-1, B Long 0-1.

=== Quarter-finals ===
23 June 1985 Quarter-final	Douglas	4-08 - 1-12	Bishopstown	Páirc Uí Chaoimh
	P Walsh 3-4, J Grimes 1-2, P Lynch 0-2.		G McCarthy 1-5, E Murphy 0-5, C Coffey 0-1.

23 June 1985 Quarter-final	Éire Óg	2-06 - 0-09	Ballinhassig	Ballinora
	D O'Flynn 1-1, M Flynn 1-0, J O'Leary 0-3, D Desmond 0-1, P O'Flynn 0-1.		S McCarthy 0-5, P Cussen 0-1, P Fleming 0-1, C Cottrell 0-1, M O'Keeffe 0-1.

30 June 1985 Quarter-final	Blackrock	4-10 - 2-10	Midleton	Páirc Liam Mhic Cárthaigh
	T Lyons 2-0, P Hayes 1-2, M Everard 1-0, J Evans 0-3, B Cummins 0-1, K Murphy 0-1, P O'Neill 0-1, T Ahern 0-1, M Lyons 0-1.		G Fitzgerald 2-5, M O'Mahony 0-2, E Harty 0-1, D Crotty 0-1, G Smith 0-1.

14 July 1985 Quarter-final	Inniscarra	2-12 - 0-10	Castletownroche	Riverstown Sportsfield
	J Feeney 2-0, G Manley 0-3, P O'Connell 0-3, J O'Leary 0-2, G O'Mahony 0-1, J Riordan 0-1, P Maher 0-1, C Maher 0-1.		Dave Relihan 0-5, F Fallon 0-2, Dan Relihan 0-2, J Power 0-1.

=== Semi-finals ===
26 July 1985 Semi-final	Blackrock	2-16 - 2-10	Douglas	Ballinlough
	M Lyons 1-2, O Kavanagh 1-1, P Hayes 0-3, B Healy 0-3, T Murphy 0-2, B Cummins 0-2, M Everard 0-1, J Evans 0-1, K Murphy 0-1.		P Walsh 1-5, F Bermingham 1-1, T Hurley 0-2, D Walsh 0-1, V Kelly 0-1.

27 July 1985 Semi-final	Éire Óg	4-09 - 3-07	Inniscarra	Coachford Sportsfield
	J O'Leary 1-5, D O'Flynn 1-1, M Kelleher 1-0, M Malone 1-0, J O'Flynn 0-2, D Desmond 0-1.		J O'Leary 2-1, J Feeney 1-0, P O'Connell 0-3, J O'riordan 0-1, G Manley 0-1, P Maher 0-1.

=== Final ===
18 August 1985 Final	Éire Óg	0-14 - 2-07	Blackrock	Riverstown Sportsfield
	D Desmond 0-5, D O'Leary 0-3, M O'Flynn 0-2, M Malone 0-2, M Kelleher 0-2.		B Cummins 1-0, T Murphy 1-0, P Hayes 0-3, T Ahern 0-1, M Everard 0-1, E Kavanagh 0-1, M Lyons 0-1.

== Championship statistics ==
=== Top scorers ===
Overall

Rank	Player	Club	Tally	Total	Matches	Average
1	Pat Walsh	Douglas	5-10	25	3	8.33
2	Pádraig Crowley	Bandon	2-16	22	2	11.00
3	Dave Relihan	Castletownroche	1-18	22	4	5.50
4	Ger Manley	Inniscarra	3-11	20	4	5.00
4	James O'Leary	Éire Óg	2-14	20	4	5.00
6	John Feeney	Inniscarra	4-02	14	4	3.50
6	Ger FitzGerald	Midleton	2-08	14	2	7.00
8	John Riordan	Inniscarra	3-03	12	4	3.00
8	Paddy Hayes	Inniscarra	1-09	12	4	3.00
8	Denis Desmond	Éire Óg	0-12	12	4	3.00

In a single game

Rank	Player	Club	Tally	Total	Opposition
1	Pádraig Crowley	Bandon	2-12	18	Newtownshandrum
2	Pat Walsh	Douglas	3-04	13	Bishopstown
3	Ger Manley	Inniscarra	3-03	12	St. Vincent's
4	Ger FitzGerald	Midleton	2-05	11	Blackrock
5	John Riordan	Inniscarra	3-00	9	St. Vincent's
6	Bernie Meade	Passage	2-02	8	Éire Óg
6	Dan Relihan	Castletownroche	2-02	8	Bandon
6	Dave Relihan	Castletownroche	1-05	8	Cloughduv
6	Gabriel McCarthy	Bishopstown	1-05	8	Douglas
6	Pat Walsh	Douglas	1-05	8	Blackrock
6	James O'Leary	Éire Óg	1-05	8	Inniscarra
