= 2008–09 All-Ireland Junior Club Hurling Championship =

Championship Details
- Dates: 28 September 2008 – 15 February 2009
- Teams: 29

All Ireland Champions
- Winners: Dripsey (1st win)
- Captain: Diarmuid O'Riordan
- Manager: Johnny Keane

All Ireland Runners-up
- Runners-up: Tullogher-Rosbercon
- Captain: Pat Hartley
- Manager: Liam Barron

Provincial Champions
- Munster: Dripsey
- Leinster: Tullogher-Rosbercon
- Ulster: Lisbellaw St Patrick's
- Connacht: Skehana

Championship Statistics
- Matches Played: 28
- Total Goals: 99 (3.53 per game)
- Total Points: 574 (20.50 per game)
- Top Scorer: Diarmuid O'Riordan (5-26)

The 2008–09 All-Ireland Junior Club Hurling Championship was the sixth staging of the All-Ireland Junior Club Hurling Championship since its establishment by the Gaelic Athletic Association. The competition ran from 28 September 2008 to 15 February 2009.

The All-Ireland final was played on 15 February 2009 at Croke Park in Dublin, between Dripsey from Cork and Tullogher-Rosbercon from Kilkenny, in what was their first ever meeting in the final. Dripsey won the match by 2-15 to 0-18 to claim their first ever championship title.

Dripsey's Diarmuid O'Riordan was the championship's top scorer with 5-26.

== Connacht Junior Club Hurling Championship ==
=== Connacht semi-final ===
| 27 October 2008 Semi-final | St Mary's | 1-12 - 2-12 | Calry/St Joseph's GAA | Seán O'Heslin Memorial Park |
| | C Cunniffe 0-9, F Carroll 1-0, T Cronin 0-3. | Report | K Raymond 1-9, L Reidy 1-0, C Griffin 0-2, D Burke 0-1. |

=== Connacht final ===
| 16 November 2008 Final | Calry/St Joseph's GAA | 2-11 - 3-12 | Skehana | Markievicz Park |
| | K Raymond 0-8, M Gilmartin 1-0, M Shelly 1-0, D Burke 0-2, D Cox 0-1. | Report | M Costello 1-2, J Glynn 0-5, Damian Costello 0-4, J McHugh 1-1, B Costello 1-0. |

== Leinster Junior Club Hurling Championship ==
=== Leinster first round ===
| 19 October 2008 First round | Wolfe Tones | 3-07 - 3-05 | Brownstown | Hugh Divine Park |
| | P Cullen 1-5, N Cox 1-1, K Cox 1-0, M Coyle 0-1. | | J McGuinness 1-3, K Higgins 1-1, D Brady 1-0, C Slator 0-1. |

| 19 October 2008 First round | Gaeil Colmcille | 1-06 - 4-05 | Ballyskenagh | Páirc Tailteann |
| | T Shine 1-0, S Reddy 0-3, R Flanagan 0-2, B Murray 0-1. | | A Middleton 2-0, M Lalor 1-1, T Maher 1-1, T Hennessy 0-2, A Franks 0-1. |

| 1 November 2008 First round | Trinity Gaels | 2-09 - 2-15 | Tullogher–Rosbercon | O'Toole Park |
| | P Fennelly 1-8, J Ryan 1-1. | | L Barron 0-6, W Walsh 1-2, E Mullally 1-2, R Dollard 0-3, S Ryan 0-1, M Cotterell 0-1. |

=== Leinster quarter-finals ===
| 2 November 2008 Quarter-final | Maynooth | w/o - scr. | Palatine | Conneff Park |

| 2 November 2008 Quarter-final | Ballyskenagh | 2-11 - 1-09 | Knockbridge | St Mary's Field |
| | T Maher 2-2, A Franks 0-4, D Middleton 0-2, T Hennessy 0-1, S Carroll 0-1, S Kirwan 0-1. | | S Kerrigan 1-2, D Dunne 0-3, T Hilliard 0-1, S Fennell 0-1, R Byrne 0-1, P Mone 0-1. |

| 2 November 2008 Quarter-final | Wolfe Tones | 1-09 - 1-13 | Clongeen | Hugh Divine Park |
| | P Cullen 1-6, M Cassidy 0-1, C McLoughlin 0-1, M Coyle 0-1. | | G O'Grady 0-9, C Byrne 1-3, S Cahill 0-1. |

| 9 November 2008 Quarter-final | Tullogher–Rosbercon | 1-09 - 0-05 | Colt | Brownstown Grounds |
| | J Barron 1-2, L Barron 0-3, E Conway 0-2, S Ryan 0-2. | | C Grant 0-2, C Murray 0-2, G Parkinson 0-1. |

=== Leinster semi-finals ===
| 15 November 2008 Semi-final | Ballyskenagh | 2-07 - 1-16 | Tullogher–Rosbercon | St Mary's Field |
| | T Hennessy 1-1, J Dooley 1-0, M Lalor 0-2, B Murphy 0-2, T Maher 0-1, A Franks 0-1. | | W Walsh 1-3, J Barron 0-3, P Hartley 0-3, E Conway 0-2, S Ryan 0-2, R Dollard 0-1, M Cotterell 0-1, L Barron 0-1. |

| 16 November 2008 Semi-final | Clongeen | 1-10 - 0-04 | Maynooth | Fr Wheeler Park |
| | G O'Grady 0-4, C Byrne 1-0, E Kent 0-3, E Murphy 0-1, J Bennett 0-1, D Redmond 0-1. | | P Ward 0-4. |

=== Leinster final ===
| 30 November 2008 Final | Tullogher–Rosbercon | 1-19 - 3-08 | Clongeen | Nowlan Park |
| | S Ryan (1-3), L Barron (0-4, 3 frees); E Conway (0-3); R Dollard (0-3), J Barron (0-2), M Bookle (0-2), P Hartley (0-1 free), W Walsh (0-1). | Report | G O'Grady (1-4, 0-4 frees, 1-0 line ball), J Colfer (1-0), C Byrne (1-0), D Redmond (0-2), E Kent (0-1); E Murphy (0-1). |

== Munster Junior Club Hurling Championship ==
=== Munster quarter-finals ===
| 16 November 2008 Quarter-final | Kilgarvan | 3-11 - 3-10 | Emly | Fr. Breen Park |
| | M Foley 2-1, G Egan 0-6, K O'Sullivan 1-1, K Harrington 0-2, D O'Sullivan 0-1. | | P Buckley 3-6, E Buckley 0-2, J Purcell 0-1, D Buirnes 0-1. |

| 16 November 2008 Quarter-final | Dripsey | 3-17 - 0-12 | Modeligo | Coachford Sportsfield |
| | D O’Riordan 2-6 (1-0 pen, 0-4 frees); D Buckley 0-5; J Hogan 1-0; M O’Sullivan 0-3; G Murphy, D O’Sullivan, J Carey 0-1 each. | Report | K McCarthy 0-5 (frees); P O’Donovan 0-3; P Walsh, J Fitzgerald, W O’Grady, B McCarthy 0-1 each. |

=== Munster semi-finals ===
| 23 November 2008 Semi-final | Dripsey | 2-12 - 1-06 | Monagea | Dr. Mannix Sportsfield |
| | D O'Riordan 1-5, J Hogan 1-1, D O'Sullivan 0-3, G Murphy 0-2, M O'Sullivan 0-1. | | T O'Callaghan 1-0, S Herlihy 0-4, DJ Corbett 0-1, J Hough 0-1. |

- Kilgarvan received a bye in this round as there were no Clare representatives.

=== Munster final ===
| 14 December 2008 Final | Dripsey | 2-11 - 1-03 | Kilgarvan | Mallow GAA Complex |
| | M O'Sullivan 2-0, D O'Sullivan 0-5 (2f), D Buckley, D O'Riordan (1f), 0-2 each, D Foley, G Murphy 0-1 each. | Report | F O'Brien 1-0, M Foley 0-2 (2f), K Harrington 0-1. | Referee: G Hoey (Clare) |

== Ulster Junior Club Hurling Championship ==
=== Ulster preliminary round ===
| 28 September 2008 Preliminary round | Ballela | 6-13 - 2-07 | Naomh Colum Cille | Páirc Esler |

=== Ulster quarter-finals ===
| 5 October 2008 Quarter-final | Ballela | 1-19 - 2-08 | St Malachy's | The Playing Fields |

| 5 October 2008 Quarter-final | Lisbellaw St Patrick's | 2-12 - 0-11 | Monaghan Harps | St Molaise Park |
| | S Corrigan 1-2, K Keogh 1-2, B McGarry 0-2, M Slevin 0-2, J Duffy 0-2, A Breslin 0-1, D McGarry 0-1. | | P O'Connell 0-9, B Phelan 0-1, D Hahessy 0-1. |

| 5 October 2008 Quarter-final | Na Magha | 1-08 - 1-11 | Mullahoran | Dean McGlinchey Park |

| 5 October 2008 Quarter-final | St Teresa's | 1-13 - 3-11 | Setanta | Casement Park |
| | | | K Campbell 0-6, G Dwyer 1-1, D Doherty 1-1, D Cullen 0-2, S McMenamin 0-1, M McGee 0-1. |

=== Ulster semi-finals ===
| 12 October 2008 Semi-final | Setanta | 4-16 - 3-11 | Ballela | Dungannon Grounds |
| | K Campbell 1-6, B O'Brien 2-2, D Doherty 1-1, D Browne 0-3, D Cullen 0-2, M McGee 0-2. |

| 12 October 2008 Semi-final | Lisbellaw St Patrick's | 1-08 - 0-11 | Mullahoran | Pearse Park |
| | K Kehoe 1-0, S Corrigan 0-3, D Slevin 0-1, J Duffy 0-1, P McCarney 0-1, A Breslin 0-1. | | R O'Hagan 0-3, A Sheridan 0-3, H Briody 0-2, P Sheridan 0-1, P Brady 0-1, E Dalton 0-1. |

| 19 October 2008 Semi-final replay | Lisbellaw St Patrick's | 0-09 - 0-06 | Mullahoran | St Tiernach's Park |
| | J Duffy 0-6, B McGarry 0-2, K Kehoe 0-1. | | E Dalton 0-3, R O'Hagan 0-2, D Sheridan 0-1. |

=== Ulster final ===
| 2 November 2008 Final | Setanta | 4-06 - 4-15 | Lisbellaw St Patrick's | Fr Tierney Park |
| | K Campbell 1-5, B O'Brien 1-0, M McGee 1-0, D Cullen 1-0, D Doherty 0-1. | Report | R Bogue 0-8, J Duffy 1-2, D McGarry 1-2, K Kehoe 1-1, S Corrigan 1-1, A Breslin 0-1. |

== All-Ireland Junior Club Hurling Championship ==
=== All-Ireland quarter-final ===
| 18 January 2009 Quarter-final | Skehana | 2-10 - 2-02 | John Mitchel's | Duggan Park |
| | J Glynn 0-6, F Finnerty 1-2, J McHugh 1-0, S Mannion 0-1, M Costello 0-1. | | M Morrissey 1-2, S Nash 1-0. |

=== All-Ireland semi-finals ===
| 25 January 2009 Semi-final | Tullogher-Rosbercon | 2–12 – 0–06 | Skehana | Ballyagran |
| | L Barron 0–8 (7f), S Ryan 1–1, E Conway 1–0; M Bookle, R Dollard, J Barron 0–1 each. | Report | J Glynn 0–5 (4f), J McHugh 0–1. |

| 25 January 2009 Semi-final | Dripsey | 2–13 – 2–05 | Lisbellaw | Páirc Mhearnóg |
| | D O'Riordan 1–4 (0-2f), G Murphy 1–2, D O'Sullivan 0–3, C Hayes 0–2 M O'Sullivan, J Carey 0–1 each. | Report | S Corrigan 2–0 (1-0f), R Bogue 0–4 (0-3f), A Breslin 0–1. |

=== All-Ireland final ===
| 15 February 2009 Final | Dripsey | 2–15 – 0–18 | Tullogher-Rosbercon | Croke Park |
| | D O'Riordan 1-9, G Murphy 1-0, M O'Sullivan 0-2, D O'Sullivan 0-2, J Carey 0-1, D Buckley 0-1. | Report | L Barron 0-8, J Barron 0-4, S Ryan 0-2, R Dollard 0-2, E Conway 0-1, P Hartley 0-1. | Referee: A Kelly (Galway) |

== Championship statistics ==
=== Top scorers ===
Overall

| Rank | Player | Club | Tally | Total | Matches | Average |
|---|---|---|---|---|---|---|
| 1 | Diarmuid O'Riordan | Dripsey | 5-26 | 41 | 5 | 8.20 |
| 2 | Liam Barron | Tullogher-Rosbercon | 0-30 | 30 | 6 | 5.00 |
| 3 | Kevin Campbell | Setanta | 2-17 | 23 | 3 | 7.66 |
| 4 | Keith Raymond | Calry/St Joseph's | 1-17 | 20 | 2 | 10.00 |
| 4 | Gary O'Grady | Clongeen | 1-17 | 20 | 3 | 6.66 |

=== Miscellaneous ===
- Skehana became the first team to three Connacht Championship titles.
