= Peter Kelleher (Gaelic footballer) =

Irish Gaelic footballer

Personal information
- Native name: Peadar Ó Céileachair (Irish)
- Born: 12 October 1995 (age 31) Kilmichael, County Cork, Ireland
- Occupation: Garda
- Height: 6 ft 3 in (191 cm)

Sport
- Sport: Gaelic Football
- Position: Full-forward
Club
- Years: Club
- Kilmichael
Club titles
- Cork titles: 0
College
- Years: College
- Garda College
Inter-county*
Years	County	Apps (scores)
2015-present	Cork	6 (1-01)
Inter-county titles
- Munster titles: 1
- All-Irelands: 0
- NFL: 0
- All Stars: 6
- *Inter County team apps and scores correct as of 20:30, 26 September 2016.

Peter Kelleher (born 12 October 1995) is an Irish Gaelic footballer who plays as a full-forward for the Cork senior team

Born in Kilmichael, County Cork, Kelleher first played competitive Gaelic football and hurling at the De La Salle College in Macroom. Here he played in two Corn Uí Mhuirí finals, however, he ended up on the losing side on both occasions. Kelleher first appeared for the Kilmichael club at underage levels, before winning a Mid Cork Junior Football Championship medal in 2013.

Kelleher made his debut on the inter-county scene at the age of sixteen when he first linked up with the Cork minor teams as a dual player. After little success in these grades, he later won a Munster medal with the under-21 football team. Kelleher made his senior debut during the 2015 championship.

He also lined out with the Cork Senior Hurlers in 2015.

== Career statistics ==
As of match played 10 June 2017.

Team	Year	National League			Munster		All-Ireland		Total	
Team	Year	Division	Apps	Score	Apps	Score	Apps	Score	Apps	Score
Cork	2015	Division 1	0	0-00	1	0-00	0	0-00	0	0-00
Cork	2016	Division 1	6	3-01	1	0-01	3	1-00	10	4-02
Cork	2017	Division 2	4	0-01	1	0-00	0	0-00	5	0-01
Total			10	3-02	3	0-01	3	1-00	16	4-03

== Honours ==
Kilmichael

- Mid Cork Junior Football Championship (1): 2013

Cork

- Munster Under-21 Football Championship (1): 2016
