= 1936 Cork Junior Hurling Championship =

Irish hurling competition

- Champions: Blarney (1st title)
- Runners-up: Ballymartle

The 1936 Cork Junior Hurling Championship was the 39th staging of the Cork Junior Hurling Championship since its establishment by the Cork County Board.

On 25 October 1936, Blarney won the championship following a 6–02 to 3–01 defeat of Ballymartle in the final at the Cork Athletic Grounds. It was their first ever championship title.
