= 1979 Cork Intermediate Hurling Championship =

Irish hurling competition

- Dates: 11 May 1979 – 19 August 1979
- Teams: 16
- Champions: Éire Óg (1st title); Tom Sheehan (captain)
- Runners-up: Mallow; Tom Brennan (captain)

Tournament statistics
- Matches played: 16
- Goals scored: 71 (4.44 per match)
- Points scored: 297 (18.56 per match)

The 1979 Cork Intermediate Hurling Championship was the 70th staging of the Cork Intermediate Hurling Championship since its establishment by the Cork County Board in 1909. The draw for the opening round fixtures took place at the Cork Convention on 4 February 1979. The championship began on 11 May 1979 and ended on 19 August 1979.

On 19 August 1979, Éire Óg won the championship following a 7–11 to 5–08 defeat of Mallow in the final at Páirc Uí Chaoimh. This was first ever championship title.

== Results ==
=== First round ===
11 May 1979 First round	Ballinhassig	2-07 - 0-05	Watergrasshill	Ballinlough
	O Jordan 2-0, D Coleman 0-4, F Roche 0-1, P Higgins 0-1, J Reynolds 0-1.		D Kearney 0-3, B Farrell 0-1, J Higgins 0-1.

13 May 1979 First round	Passage	2-06 - 2-10	Cloughduv	Ballinhassig
	B Meade 1-5, G O'Sullivan 1-0, K Keane 0-1.		D O'Leary 1-6, M Ring 1-1, N Dunne 0-2, D Walsh 0-1.

13 May 1979 First round	Mallow	2-10 - 1-05	Inniscarra	Church Road
	T Sheehan 1-7, P Buckley 1-2, K Sheehan 0-1.		P McDonnell 1-1, T Ryan 0-4.

13 May 1979 First round	Glen Rovers	0-06 - 2-13	Éire Óg	Ballinhassig
	L Mulcahy 0-3, S Greene 0-1, L McAuliffe 0-1, JK Barry 0-1.		M O'Flynn 0-4, Denis O'Flynn 1-0, C Malone 1-0, Donal O'Flynn 0-3, D Desmond 0-3, L Flynn 0-1, J Flynn 0-1, J O'Leary 0-1.

13 May 1979 First round	Mayfield	1-13 - 2-10	St. Vincent's	Ballinlough
	E O'Loughlin 1-2, M Hannon 0-4, J Rall 0-3, J Atkins 0-2, S Long 0-1, M Atkins 0-1.		P O'Regan 1-4, D Linehan 1-0, G Corbett 0-1, W McCarthy 0-1, N Barry 0-1, P McNamara 0-1, P Barry 0-1, K Barry 0-1.

14 May 1979 First round	Carrigtwohill	4-08 - 4-09	Newtownshandrum	Fitzgerald Park

19 May 1979 First round	Blackrock	2-06 - 2-13	St. Finbarr's	Ballinlough

20 May 1979 First round	Bishopstown	1-05 - 0-11	Ballyhea	Fitzgerald Park

3 June 1979 First round replay	Mayfield	1-11 - 1-08	St. Vincent's	Páirc Uí Chaoimh

=== Quarter-finals ===
24 June 1979 Quarter-final	Ballyhea	3-08 - 2-09	Ballinhassig	Castlelyons

24 June 1979 Quarter-final	Cloughduv	5-15 - 4-04	Mayfield	Inniscarra

24 June 1979 Quarter-final	Éire Óg	2-12 - 2-10	Newtownshandrum	Banteer

24 June 1979 Quarter-final	Mallow	4-12 - 4-06	St. Finbarr's	Watergrasshill

=== Semi-finals ===
29 July 1979 Semi-final	Mallow	0-14 - 1-09	Ballyhea	Fr. Con Buckley Park
	T Sheehan 0-5, J Browne 0-3, T Coakley 0-2, K Sheehan 0-2, D Murphy 0-1, J Hayes 0-1,		D Ryan 0-5, D O'Sullivan 1-1, K McSweeney 0-2, W Shanahan 0-1.	Referee: W Horgan (Brian Dillons)

29 July 1979 Semi-final	Éire Óg	1-14 - 2-09	Cloughduv	Coachford Sportsfield

=== Final ===
19 August 1979 Final	Éire Óg	7-11 - 5-08	Mallow	Páirc Uí Chaoimh
	D Desmond 2-6, C Malone 2-0, D O'Flynn 2-0, V Twomey 1-2, M Malone 0-1, M O'Flynn 0-1, J O'Flynn 0-1.		G Hayes 2-0, J Brown 2-0, P Buckley 0-4, P Redmond 1-0, T Sheehan 0-2, K Sheehan 0-2.	Referee: M O'Flaherty (Blackrock)
