= 1962 Cork Junior Hurling Championship =

Irish hurling competition

- Dates: 7 October – 18 November 1962
- Teams: 7
- Champions: Éire Óg (1st title)
- Runners-up: Carrigtwohill

Tournament statistics
- Matches played: 7
- Goals scored: 42 (6 per match)
- Points scored: 81 (11.57 per match)

The 1962 Cork Junior Hurling Championship was the 65th staging of the Cork Junior Hurling Championship since its establishment by the Cork County Board in 1895. The championship ran from 7 October to 18 November 1962.

The final was played on 18 November 1962 at the Athletic Grounds in Cork, between Éire Óg and Carrigtwohill, in what was their first ever meeting in the final. Éire Óg won the match by 3-04 to 2-04 to claim their first ever championship title.

== Results ==
=== Quarter-finals ===
7 October 1962 Quarter-final	Kildorrery	5-04 - 4-02	Clonakilty	Cork Athletic Grounds

14 October 1962 Quarter-final	Ballinhassig	7-04 - 3-14	Millstreet	Castle Grounds

21 October 1962 Quarter-final	Carrigtwohill	2-07 - 0-12	Nemo Rangers	Cork Athletic Grounds

=== Semi-finals ===
28 October 1962 Semi-final	Ballinhassig	2-07 - 3-04	Éire Óg	Cork Athletic Grounds

4 November 1962 Semi-final replay	Ballinhassig	3-10 - 4-02	Éire Óg	Charlie Hurley Park

4 November 1962 Semi-final	Carrigtwohill	4-04 - 0-03	Kildorrery	Páirc Mhic Gearailt

=== Final ===
18 November 1962 Final	Éire Óg	3-04 - 2-04	Carrigtwohill	Cork Athletic Grounds
	D O'Leary 2-0, P O'Brien 1-0, T Brady 0-2, F Sheehan 0-1, D O'Brien 0-1.		M Fouhy 1-2, P Duggan 1-1, A Kelly 0-1.
