= Dripsey GAA =

GAA club in County Cork, Ireland

Dripsey
- Dripseach
- Founded: 2005
- County: Cork
- Colours: Red and blue
- Grounds: O'Brien's Field

Playing kits
Standard colours

Dripsey GAA Hurling and Football Club is a Gaelic Athletic Association (GAA) club in Dripsey, County Cork, Ireland. The club is affiliated to the Mid Cork Board and fields teams in both hurling and Gaelic football.

== History ==
Located in the village of Dripsey, about 12 km from Cork, Dripsey GAA Club was established in March 2005. The club was formed after an acrimonious split with the Inniscarra club, under whose banner they had played for over a century. Six players resigned from Inniscarra followed by a public meeting, in which club officers were elected and club colours decided, and eventual affiliation to the Cork County Board.

Dripsey's success was immediate, with the new club winning the Cork JBFC title in its debut year in 2005. In the 2008–09 season, Dripsey won the Mid Cork JAHC title for the first time in their history, before later claiming the Cork JAHC title after a 0–13 to 1–07 win over Diarmuid Ó Mathúna's. The club later won the 2008 Munster Club JHC title, before Dripsey beat Tullogher-Rosbercon by 2–15 to 0–18 in the 2009 All-Ireland Cub JHC final.

== Honours ==
- All-Ireland Junior Club Hurling Championship (1): 2009
- Munster Junior Club Hurling Championship (1): 2009
- Cork Junior A Hurling Championship (1): 2008
- Mid Cork Junior A Hurling Championship (1): 2008
- Cork Junior B Football Championship (2): 2005, 2020

== Notable players ==
- Diarmuid O'Riordan: All-Ireland MHC–winner (2001)
