= Kilmichael GAA =

Gaelic games club in County Cork, Ireland

Kilmichael
- Cill Mhíchil
- County: Cork
- Colours: Blue and gold

Playing kits
Standard colours

Kilmichael GAA is a Gaelic football and hurling club based in the village of Kilmichael in County Cork, Ireland. The club participates in Cork GAA competitions and in Muskerry board competitions.

== Achievements ==
- Cork Junior B Hurling Championship (1): 2011
- Mid Cork Junior A Football Championship (7): 1953, 1956, 1959, 1960, 1963, 1987, 2013
- Mid Cork Junior 'B' Football Championship (2): 1982, 2006
- Cork Under-21 C Football Championship (1): 2024
- Cork Minor C Football Championship (1): 2010, 2026

== Notable players ==
- Peter Kelleher (Cork Senior football and minor hurling; Cork U21 football, Senior Hurling Waterford Crystal)
- Kevin Murray (Cork hurling)
