= Muskerry GAA =

Gaelic football and hurling division

- CLG Mhúscraí
- Founded: 1925
- County: Cork
- Colours: White and green

Playing kits
Standard colours

Senior Club Championships
	All Ireland	Munster champions	Cork champions
Football:	-	-	1
Camogie:	-	-	2

Muskerry GAA is a Gaelic football and hurling division located in the middle region of County Cork, Ireland. It is one of eight divisions of Cork GAA County Board. The division includes clubs from areas to the west of Cork city stretching to the county bounds with Kerry. Its name is derived from the ancient Gaelic kingdom of Múscraige which, following the Norman conquest, now encompasses the baronies of Muskerry West and Muskerry East. These baronies, or half-baronies, include towns such as Macroom, Ballincollig, and Ballingeary. Muskerry GAA is bordered by Carrigdhoun GAA and Carbery GAA divisions to the south and by Duhallow GAA to the north. It organizes competitions for the clubs within the division, from "Under 12" up to the adult level. The winners of these competitions compete against other divisional champions to determine which club is the county champion. In addition, the division selects football and hurling teams from the adult teams playing at junior level or county intermediate level; these then compete for the Cork Senior Football Championship and Cork Senior Hurling Championship.

== History ==
The division was established in 1925. Hurling was the major game in the division at that time and the 1925 Junior Championship Draws tell their own story.

Junior hurling (9 teams):

- Cloughduv v Ballinora
- Inniscarra v Aghabullogue
- Macroom v Blarney
- Shournagh Valley v Ballincollig
- Bye Bride Valley

Junior football (3 teams):

- Kilmurry v Macroom
- Bye Bride Valley

To address the position of junior football in the Western area, a meeting was held in Ballincollig on 11 January 1925. The following motion was referred to the Annual Convention in Macroom 'That a Sub - Committee be appointed to carry on and organize football in the Western end of the Division'. The game is exceptionally strong in the division at present.

A Minor Hurling Championship was introduced in 1926. The following year a Minor Football Championship was introduced.

More clubs were formed which participated in both codes and all championships.

Competitions have continued to increase in number with a Junior (B) Hurling Championship being introduced in the 1940s and a Junior (B) Football Championship being introduced in 1961.

Under 21 championships in both codes were introduced in 1963 and as the facilities in the division improved beyond all recognition, the activities on the field of play have continued to increase and multiply.

24 competitions involving 21 clubs were organised this current year and they were all keenly contested. The standard of play was high and the division was well represented on all the codes' All Ireland winning teams. The Muskerry divisional teams have participated in the Senior Championships in both codes on a regular basis and they have generally given good accounts of themselves.

In football the historic outright Cork Senior Football Championship Title victory in 1970 was a particularly significant achievement. The senior footballers also did well to contest finals in 1962, 1995, and 2005. In senior hurling, Muskerry came close to making it a Senior County Championship Double in 1970, when they were two points behind U.C.C. at the end of an exciting Cork Senior Hurling Championship Final.

The First Officers of the Muskerry Divisional Board in 1925 were:

- Chairman, William Fitzgerald (Bride Valley)
- Secretary, Guvanni Janvier (Ballinora)
- Treasurer, D.J. Walsh (Inniscarra)

== Achievements ==
- Cork Senior Football Championship, winner (1) 1970
- Cork Senior Hurling Championship, runner-up 1970

== List of clubs ==
- Aghabullogue
- Aghinagh
- Ballincollig
- Béal Átha Ghaorthaidh
- Ballinora
- Blarney
- Canovee
- Cill Na Martra
- Clondrohid
- Cloughduv
- Donoughmore
- Dripsey
- Éire Óg
- Grenagh
- Gleann na Laoi
- Inniscarra
- Iveleary
- Kilmurry
- Kilmichael
- Laochra Óg
- Macroom
- Naomh Abán

== Notable players ==
- Fintan Goold
- Daniel Goulding
- Tom Kenny
- Mick Malone
- John O'Driscoll
- Noel O'Leary
- Ciarán Sheehan
- Anthony Lynch
- [Johnny Galvin]]
- [sean o riordan]]

== Divisional competitions ==
- Mid Cork Junior A Football Championship
- Mid Cork Junior B Football Championship
- Mid Cork Junior C Football Championship
- Mid Cork Junior A Hurling Championship
- Mid Cork Junior B Hurling Championship
- Mid Cork Under-21 Football Championship
- Mid Cork Under-21 Hurling Championship

== Hurling ==
=== 2027 Grades ===
Championship	Club
Senior
Premier Senior	Muskerry
Senior A	Ballincollig
Senior A	Blarney
Senior A	Inniscarra
Intermediate
Premier Intermediate	Aghabullogue
Premier Intermediate	Éire Óg
Intermediate A	None
Junior
Premier Junior	Cloughduv
Junior A	Aghabullogue (2)
Junior A	Ballincollig (2)
Junior A	Ballinora
Junior A	Blarney (2)
Junior A	Cloughduv (2)
Junior A	Donoughmore
Junior A	Dripsey
Junior A	Éire Óg (2)
Junior A	Grenagh
Junior A	Inniscarra (2)
Junior A	Iveleary
Junior A	Kilmichael
Junior B	Ballincollig (3)
Junior B	Ballinora (2)
Junior B	Blarney (3)
Junior B	Donoughmore (2)
Junior B	Éire Óg (3)
Junior B	Gleann na Laoi
Junior B	Grenagh (2)
Junior B	Inniscarra (3)
Junior B	Laochra Óg

== Football ==
=== 2027 Championship Grades ===
Championship	Club
Senior
Premier Senior	Muskerry
Premier Senior	Ballincollig
Senior A	Aghabullogue
Senior A	Béal Átha'n Ghaorthaidh
Senior A	Cill na Martra
Senior A	Éire Óg
Senior A	Iveleary
Intermediate
Premier Intermediate	Kilmurry
Premier Intermediate	Macroom
Premier Intermediate	Naomh Abán
Intermediate A	Ballinora
Intermediate A	Canovee
Junior
Premier Junior	Inniscarra
Junior A	Aghinagh
Junior A	Ballincollig (2)
Junior A	Béal Átha'n Ghaorthaidh (2)
Junior A	Blarney
Junior A	Clondrohid
Junior A	Donoughmore
Junior A	Dripsey
Junior A	Éire Óg (2)
Junior A	Grenagh
Junior A	Kilmichael
Junior A	Kilmurry (2)
Junior A	Naomh Abán (2)
Junior B	Aghabullogue (2)
Junior B	Aghinagh (2)
Junior B	Ballincollig (3)
Junior B	Ballinora (2)
Junior B	Canovee (2)
Junior B	Cill na Martra (2)
Junior B	Donoughmore (2)
Junior B	Éire Óg (3)
Junior B	Gleann na Laoi
Junior B	Grenagh (2)
Junior B	Inniscarra (2)
Junior B	Iveleary (2)
Junior B	Kilmichael (2)
Junior B	Macroom (2)
Junior C	Aghabullogue (3)
Junior C	Aghinagh (3)
Junior C	Ballincollig (4)
Junior C	Ballinora (3)
Junior C	Béal Átha'n Ghaorthaidh (3)
Junior C	Canovee (3)
Junior C	Cill na Martra (3)
Junior C	Clondrohid (2)
Junior C	Donoughmore (3)
Junior C	Éire Óg (4)
Junior C	Inniscarra (3)
Junior C	Kilmichael (3)
Junior C	Kilmurry (3)
Junior C	Macroom (3)
Junior C	Naomh Abán (3)
