= Éire Óg GAA (Cork) =

Gaelic games club in County Cork, Ireland

Éire Óg
- Éire Óg
- Founded: 1928
- County: Cork
- Colours
- Grounds: Éire Óg GAA Grounds
- Coordinates: 51°52′31″N 8°40′07″W

Playing kits
Standard colours

Senior Club Championships
	All Ireland	Munster champions	Cork champions
Hurling:	0	0	1
Ladies' football:	0	0	1
Camogie:	0	1	4

Éire Óg GAA is a Gaelic Athletic Association club located in Ovens, County Cork, Ireland. The club is affiliated to the Muskerry Board and the Cork County Board and fields teams in hurling, camogie and Gaelic football.

== Foundation ==
Gaelic games were played in the Ovens and Farran areas in the early years of the Gaelic Athletic Association. A team known as Bride Valley existed in the parish and played Inniscarra in a hurling game at Coachford in April 1891. Bride Valley later lapsed as a club before being reformed in 1923. Five years later, Bride Valley amalgamated with Cloughduv to form a new club called Éire Óg.

== History ==
Success was immediate for the new club, with Éire Óg winning the Cork SHC for the first and only time in its history in 1928, following a 5–02 to 3–02 win over Mallow in the final. Shortly after this, Cloughduv broke away from Bride Valley and returned to being a club in its own right. Bridevalley retained the Éire Óg name after the split.

The following decades saw Éire Óg regrade to the divisional junior ranks. The club won three successive Mid Cork JHC titles between 1960 and 1962, the last of which was converted into a Cork JHC title after a 3–04 to 2–04 win over Carrigtwohill in the final. A second Cork JHC title was won in 1977. Éire Óg returned to the senior ranks after a long absence when, in 1979, the club beat Mallow by 7–11 to 5–08 to win the Cork IHC title. A one-point win over Blackrock in the 1985 final secured Éire Óg's second Cork IHC title.

The first two decades of the 21st century saw a greater emphasis on Gaelic football, with the club completing a remarkable rise from junior to senior status in a 12-year period. Éire Óg won the Cork JAFC title in 2008, following a 1–08 to 1–05 win over Ballygarvan in the final. Another promotion was secured in 2014, when Éire Óg won the Cork IFC after an eight-point win over Rockchapel. The Gaelic football success continued in 2019, when senior status was secured for the first time ever. A 0–14 to 0–12 win over St Michael's in the final gave Éire Óg the Cork PIFC title.

2020 was a notable year in the history of Éire Óg. The club secured a second consecutive Gaelic football promotion, after beating Mallow by 2–13 to 1–07 to become the inaugural winners of the Cork SAFC. The COVID-delayed season ended with Éire Óg winning their third Cork IAHC title, following a 2–16 to 1–17 win over Aghabullogue in the final.

== Honours ==
=== Men ===
- Cork Senior Hurling Championship (1): 1928
- Cork Senior A Football Championship (1): 2020
- Cork Premier Intermediate Football Championship (1): 2019
- Cork Intermediate Hurling Championship (3): 1979, 1985, 2020
- Cork Intermediate Football Championship (1): 2014
- Cork Junior A Hurling Championship (2): 1962, 1977
- Cork Junior A Football Championship (1): 2008
- Mid Cork Junior A Hurling Championship (7): 1930, 1960, 1961, 1962, 1971, 1972, 1977
- Mid Cork Junior A Football Championship (2): 1976, 2008
- Cork Minor Premier 1 Football Championship (1): 2017
- Cork Minor A Hurling Championship (3): 1993, 2008, 2014
- Cork Minor A Football Championship (2): 2002, 2006

=== Women ===
- Munster Senior Club Camogie Championship (1): 1985
- Cork Senior Camogie Championship (4): 1977, 1978, 1979, 1985
- Cork Ladies' Senior Football Championship (1): 2025

== Notable players ==
- Dinny Barry-Murphy: All-Ireland SHC-winning captain (1929)
- Daniel Goulding: All-Ireland SFC-winner (2010)
- Mick Malone: All-Ireland SHC-winner (1976, 1977)
- Ciarán Sheehan: All-Ireland SFC-winner (2010)
- Colm Sheehan: All-Ireland SHC-winner (1966)
