= Blarney GAA =

Gaelic games club in County Cork, Ireland

- An Bhlarna
- Founded: 1885
- County: Cork
- Colours
- Grounds: Blarney GAA Grounds
- Coordinates: 51°55′44.43″N 8°33′39.57″W

Playing kits
Standard colours

Blarney GAA is a Gaelic Athletic Association club in Blarney, County Cork, Ireland. The club is affiliated to the Muskerry Board and is primarily concerned with the game of hurling, but also fields teams in Gaelic football.

== History ==
Records of hurling being played in Blarney date back to 1770, with an organised club being in existence long before the foundation of the Gaelic Athletic Association. Blarney GAA Club officially affiliated to the new organisation on 1 May 1884. The club was in its infancy when it was beaten by Blackrock in the 1894 Cork SHC final.

Blarney won three Mid Cork JHC titles between 1931 and 1936, with the last of these victories being converted into a Cork JHC triumph. This was followed by consecutive Cork IHC titles in 1937 and 1938 and a brief return to senior status. Blarney later returned to the junior ranks and continued to win divisional JHC titles at various intervals, while the club also won Mid Cork JFC titles in 1951 and 1954. Blarney won their second Cork JHC title after a defeat of Kilworth in 1993.

The new century saw Blarney return to senior hurling after an absence of nearly 70 years when the club won the Cork PIHC title in 2008. This was followed by the Munster Club IHC title before Blarney beat Cappataggle by 2-14 to 1-12 in the 2009 All-Ireland Club IHC final.

== Honours ==
- All-Ireland Intermediate Club Hurling Championship (1): 2009
- Munster Intermediate Club Hurling Championship (1): 2008
- Cork Premier Intermediate Hurling Championship (2): 2008, 2020
- Cork Intermediate Hurling Championship (2): 1937, 1938
- Cork Junior A Hurling Championship (2): 1936, 1993
- Cork Junior B Inter-Divisional Football Championship (1): 2022
- Mid Cork Junior A Hurling Championship (13): 1931, 1934, 1936, 1943, 1944, 1946, 1969, 1978, 1979, 1980, 1985, 1992, 1993
- Mid Cork Junior A Football Championship (4): 1951, 1954, 2009, 2010
- Cork Minor Hurling Championship (1): 2018
- Cork Minor A Hurling Championship (2): 1997, 2004
- Cork Premier 2 Minor Hurling Championship (1): 2016

== Notable players ==
- Shane Barrett: National Hurling League-winner (2025) All-Star winner.
- Mark Coleman: National Hurling League-winner (2025) All-Star winner.
- John Griffin: Christy Ring Cup-winner (2011, 2015)
- Pádraig Power: All-Ireland U20HC-winner (2020, 2021)
