= Bertie O'Brien =

Irish Gaelic footballer (1951–2023)

Personal information
- Native name: Beircheart Ó Briain (Irish)
- Born: 1951 Cork, Ireland
- Died: 2 March 2023 (aged 71) Cork, Ireland

Sport
- Sport: Gaelic Football
- Position: Goalkeeper
Club
- Years: Club
- 1969-1983: St Finbarr's
Club titles
	Football	Hurling
Cork titles	4	4
Munster titles	3	3
All-Ireland titles	2	2
Inter-county*
Years	County	Apps (scores)
1974-1979 1974; 1979-1980	Cork (SF); Cork (SH)	0 (0-00); 0 (0-00)
Inter-county titles
- Munster titles: 0
- All-Irelands: 0
- NFL: 0
- All Stars: 0
- *Inter County team apps and scores correct as of 15:27, 3 January 2013.

Bertie O'Brien (1951 – 2 March 2023) was an Irish hurler and Gaelic footballer. He played at club level with St. Finbarr's and was a dual player at various levels with Cork.

== Career ==
O'Brien first played Gaelic football and hurling in the Lough Leagues, before later lining out as a schoolboy with Sullivan's Quay CBS. He had his first success at club level when he won a Cork MFC title with St. Finbarr's in 1968. O'Brien was still in his teens when he lined out with the intermediate team before making his senior debut as a dual player.

O'Brien has his first senior successes as a hurler when St. Finbarr's claimed the Cork, Munster and All-Ireland titles during the 1974–75 season. Over the course of the following decade he enjoyed many more successes, including a second All-Ireland club hurling medal in 1978 and All-Ireland club football victories in 1980 and 1981. O'Brien became only the second player since John Lyons to captain his club to hurling football honours. His career effectively ended after breaking his leg in a club game in 1983.

O'Brien first appeared on the inter-county with Cork as goalkeeper on the minor team that beat Derry in the 1969 All-Ireland MFC final. He later claimed provincial titles in the under-21 and junior grades. O'Brien was called for a trial with the Cork senior hurling team, however, he later joined the Cork senior football team and was understudy to goalkeeper Billy Morgan when Cork won the Munster SFC title in 1974. He returned to the senior hurling team for the 1979-80 league but was dropped from the team for the latter stages.

== Coaching career ==
In retirement from playing, O'Brien became active as coach and selector with various St. Finbarr's teams. He was part of the management team when the club won their third All-Ireland club football title in 1987. O'Brien also spent nearly 25 years as a member of the club's hurling committee.

== Death ==
O'Brien died on 2 March 2023, at the age of 71.

== Honours ==
=== Player ===
St. Finbarr's

- All-Ireland Senior Club Hurling Championship: 1975, 1978
- All-Ireland Senior Club Football Championship: 1980, 1981 (c)
- Munster Senior Club Hurling Championship: 1974, 1977, 1980 (c)
- Munster Senior Club Football Championship: 1979, 1980 (c), 1982
- Cork Senior Hurling Championship: 1974, 1980 (c), 1981, 1982
- Cork Senior Football Championship: 1976, 1979, 1980, 1982 (c)
- Cork Minor Football Championship: 1968

Cork

- Munster Senior Football Championship: 1974
- Munster Junior Football Championship: 1971 (c)
- Munster Under-21 Football Championship: 1971
- All-Ireland Minor Football Championship: 1969
- Munster Minor Football Championship: 1969

=== Selector ===
St. Finbarr's

- All-Ireland Senior Club Football Championship: 1987
- Munster Senior Club Football Championship: 1986
- Cork Senior Football Championship: 1985

Achievements
Preceded by Gene Aherne	All-Ireland Senior Club Football Final winning captain 1981	Succeeded by Colm Murphy
