= John Cremin (hurler) =

Irish hurler and coach

Personal information
- Native name: Seán Ó Croimín (Irish)
- Born: 1958 (age 67–68) Togher, Cork, Ireland

Sport
- Sport: Hurling
- Position: Midfield
Club
- Years: Club
- St Finbarr's
Club titles
	Football	Hurling
Cork titles	3	6
Munster titles	3	2
All-Ireland titles	2	1
Inter-county
- Years: County
- 1979-1982: Cork
Inter-county titles
- Munster titles: 0
- All-Irelands: 0
- NHL: 0
- All Stars: 0

John Cremin (born 1958) is an Irish hurling coach and former player. At club level, he played with St Finabrr's and at inter-county level with the Cork senior hurling team.

== Playing career ==
Cremin first played for the St Finbarr's club as a dual player at juvenile and underage levels. He was part of the club's minor teams that won a Cork MHC-MFC double in 1975. Cremin later won consecutive Cork U21FC title in 1977 and 1978.

After progressing to the club's senior teams, again as a dual player, Cremin won six Cork SHC and three Cork SFC medals between 1977 and 1988. These were subsequently converted into three Munster Club SFC and two Munster Club SHC medals. Cremin was at midfield when St Finbarr's beat Rathnure by four points in the 1978 All-Ireland Club SHC final. He later won two All-Ireland Club SFC medals.

Cremin first appeared on the inter-county scene for Cork as a dual player at minor level. He captained Cork to a 1-10 to 0-06 defeat by Galway in the 1976 All-Ireland MFC final. Cremin continued his dual status at under-21 level and won a Munster U20FC medal, as team captain, in 1979. He missed the subsequent defeat by Down in the All-Ireland U21FC final because of a broken collarbone. Cremin made his Cork senior hurling team debut in a National Hurling League game against Carlow in February 1979.

== Management career ==
Cremin first served as manager of the St Finbarr's senior hurling team for two seasons in 2014 and 2015. He returned to the position on an interim basis in August 2020, following Aidan Fitzpatrick's resignation from the position.

== Honours ==
St Finbarr's

- All-Ireland Senior Club Hurling Championship: 1978
- All-Ireland Senior Club Football Championship: 1981, 1987
- Munster Senior Club Hurling Championship: 1977, 1980
- Munster Senior Club Football Championship: 1980, 1982, 1986, 2021
- Cork Senior Football Championship: 1980, 1982, 1985
- Cork Senior Hurling Championship: 1977, 1980, 1981, 1982, 1984, 1988
- Cork Under-21 Football Championship: 1977, 1978
- Cork Minor Hurling Championship: 1975
- Cork Minor Football Championship: 1975

Cork

- Munster Under-21 Football Championship: 1979 (c)

Sporting positions
Preceded by	Cork minor football team captain 1976	Succeeded by
Preceded by	Cork under-21 football team captain 1979	Succeeded by
