= Christy Ryan =

Irish hurler and Gaelic footballer (1957–2021)

Personal information
- Native name: Crisotóir Ó Riain (Irish)
- Born: 18 August 1957 Ballyphehane, Cork, Ireland
- Died: 8 February 2021 (aged 63) Glasheen, Cork, Ireland
- Height: 6 ft 2 in (188 cm)

Sport
- Sport: Gaelic football
- Position: Centre-back
Club
- Years: Club
- 1976–1992: St Finbarr's
Club titles
	Football	Hurling
Cork titles	5	6
Munster titles	4	2
All-Ireland titles	3	1
Inter-county*
Years	County	Apps (scores)
1977–1987	Cork	24 (0-7)
Inter-county titles
- Munster titles: 2
- All-Irelands: 0
- NFL: 1
- All Stars: 0
- *Inter County team apps and scores correct as of 17:42, 9 February 2021.

Christopher D. Ryan (18 August 1957 – 8 February 2021) was an Irish Gaelic footballer, hurler and coach. As a dual player for club and county, he played in several positions including as a defensive centre-back, in midfield, or as a target man in attack. Ryan has been described as one of Cork's most decorated club players of all time.

== Biography ==
=== Playing career ===
Ryan began his club career at underage level with St Finbarr's, winning minor and under-21 championships across both codes. He was just 18 years of age when he was drafted onto the club's senior teams in 1976 and began the first of seventeen consecutive seasons as a senior dual player. During that time, Ryan lined out in 20 county finals, winning six Cork SHC titles and five Cork SFC. He also won a combined total of six Munster Club Championships and four All-Ireland Club Championships, captaining "the Barr's" footballers to the title in 1980.

After an unsuccessful minor and under-21 career at inter-county level, Ryan joined the Cork senior football team in advance of the 1977-78 league. During a decade-long association with the team he served as captain on two occasions, a position he held for Cork's National League success in 1980 and their Munster Championship victory in 1983. Ryan, who also won a National League title with the Cork senior hurling team, ended his career with an All-Ireland final defeat by Meath in 1987.

=== Death ===
Ryan died in Glasheen on 8 February 2021, at the age of 63.

== Honours ==
St Finbarr's

- All-Ireland Senior Club Hurling Championship: 1978
- All-Ireland Senior Club Football Championship: 1980 (c), 1981, 1987
- Munster Senior Club Hurling Championship: 1978, 1980
- Munster Senior Club Football Championship: 1979, 1980 (c), 1982, 1986
- Cork Senior Hurling Championship: 1977, 1980, 1981, 1982, 1984, 1988
- Cork Senior Football Championship: 1976, 1979, 1980 (c), 1982, 1985
- Cork Under-21 Football Championship: 1977 (c), 1978 (c)
- Cork Minor Hurling Championship: 1975
- Cork Minor Football Championship: 1975

Cork

- Munster Senior Football Championship: 1983 (c), 1987
- National Football League: 1979-80 (c)
- National Hurling League: 1979-80

Munster

- Railway Cup: 1981, 1982

Sporting positions
Preceded by Brian Murphy	Cork Senior Football Captain; 1980-1981	Succeeded by Dinny Allen
Preceded by Dinny Allen	Cork Senior Football Captain; 1983	Succeeded by Jimmy Kerrigan
Achievements
Preceded by Brian Murphy	All-Ireland Senior Club Football Final winning captain 1980	Succeeded by John Allen
