= John Kerins (Gaelic footballer) =

Irish Gaelic footballer (1962–2001)

Personal information
- Native name: Seán Ó Céirín (Irish)
- Born: 19 July 1962 The Lough, Cork, Ireland
- Died: 21 August 2001 (aged 39) Wellington Road, Cork, Ireland
- Occupation: Garda detective
- Height: 6 ft 1 in (185 cm)

Sport
- Sport: Gaelic football
- Position: Goalkeeper
Club
- Years: Club
- 1982–1996: St Finbarr's
Club titles
- Cork titles: 2
- Munster titles: 2
- All-Ireland Titles: 1
Inter-county
Years	County	Apps (scores)
1983–1994	Cork	35 (0–00)
Inter-county titles
- Munster titles: 7
- All-Irelands: 2
- NFL: 1
- All Stars: 2

John Kerins (19 July 1962 – 21 August 2001) was an Irish Gaelic football manager and player. In a career that spanned two decades he played at club level with St Finbarr's and at senior inter-county level with the Cork county team.

== Career ==
Kerins first came to prominence as a schoolboy with Coláiste Chríost Rí with whom he won successive Corn Uí Mhuirí titles. He subsequently made his senior debut at club level with St Finbarr's and won one All-Ireland Club Championship title during a 15-year career. Kerins first appeared on the inter-county scene as a dual player at minor level before winning an All-Ireland Under-21 Championship title as reserve goalkeeper to Michael Creedon in 1981. He subsequently joined the Cork senior football team, once again as understudy to Creedon, and won the first of seven Munster Championship titles in his debut season in 1983. Kerins later added a National League to his collection before claiming successive All-Ireland medals in 1989 and 1990. A two-time All-Star-winner, he was also selected for Munster. In retirement from playing Kerins served as coach of the St Finbarr's minor and senior teams, guiding the former to championship success.

== Personal life and death ==
Born in Cork, Kerins joined the Garda Síochána and was based in Gurranabraher where he reached the rank of detective. On 21 August 2001, three months after being diagnosed with cancer, Kerins died at the age of 39.

== Honours ==
Coláiste Chríost Rí

- Corn Uí Mhuirí: 1979, 1980

St Finbarr's

- All-Ireland Senior Club Football Championship: 1987
- Munster Senior Club Football Championship: 1982, 1986
- Cork Senior Football Championship: 1982, 1985

Cork

- All-Ireland Senior Football Championship: 1989, 1990
- Munster Senior Football Championship: 1983, 1987, 1988, 1989, 1990, 1993, 1994
- National Football League: 1988-89
- All-Ireland Under-21 Football Championship: 1981
- Munster Under-21 Football Championship: 1981, 1982

Sporting positions
Preceded by Conor Counihan	Cork Senior Football Captain; 1986	Succeeded by Conor Counihan
