= 1984 Cork Senior Hurling Championship =

Annual hurling competition season

- Dates: 4 May – 30 September 1984
- Teams: 19
- Champions: St. Finbarr's (23rd title); John Hodgins (captain); Con Roche (manager)
- Runners-up: Ballyhea; Connie Brassill (captain); Jerome O'Keeffe (manager)

Tournament statistics
- Matches played: 19
- Goals scored: 85 (4.47 per match)
- Points scored: 396 (20.84 per match)
- Top scorer(s): Denis Walsh (0-31)

The 1984 Cork Senior Hurling Championship was the 96th staging of the Cork Senior Hurling Championship since its establishment by the Cork County Board in 1887. The championship began on 4 May 1984 and ended on 30 September 1984.

Midleton entered the championship as the defending champions, however, they were beaten by St. Finbarr's in the quarter-finals. University College Cork fielded a team after a two-year absence.

The final was played on 30 September 1984 at Páirc Uí Chaoimh in Cork, between St. Finbarr's and Ballyhea, in what was their first ever meeting in the final. St. Finbarr's won the match by 1–15 to 2–04 to claim their 23rd championship title overall and a first title in two years.

Denis Walsh was the championship's top scorer with 0-31.

== Results ==
=== First round ===
4 May 1984 First round	University College Cork	3-05 - 7-12	Seandún	Páirc Uí Chaoimh
	J O'Connor 1-0, M Everard 1-0, J O'Neill 1-0, G Sheehan 0-2, M Sheehan 0-2, N English 0-1.		K Keane 3-0, P O'Sullivan 2-1, D Keane 2-0, C Coffey 0-3, P Walsh 0-3, G McCarthy 0-2, J Corcoran 0-1, J Horgan 0-1, T O'Neill 0-1.

11 May 1984 First round	Glen Rovers	2-12 - 0-19	St. Finbarr's	Páirc Uí Chaoimh
	P Horgan 1-3, T Mulcahy 1-0, C Ring 0-4, J Buckley 0-2, A Kinsella 0-2, T O'Neill 0-1.		D Walsh 0-6, C Ryan 0-5, É Fitzpatrick 0-3, T Finn 0-2, J Meyler 0-2, J Barry-Murphy 0-1.	Referee: F Murphy (Blackrock)

12 May 1984 First round	Youghal	3-05 - 0-12	Milford	Mitchelstown
	T Coyne 1-3, S O'Leary 1-1, M Butler 1-0, M Coyne 0-1.		S O'Gorman 0-8, M Fitzgibbon 0-2, P Madigan 0-1, N Fitzgibbon 0-1.	Referee: W Horgan (Brian Dillons)

=== Second round ===
5 May 1984 Second round	Midleton	7-11 - 2-03	Imokilly	Youghal
	K Hennessy 3-2, D Boylan 3-0, J Fenton 0-8, J Boylan 1-0, G Fitzgerald 0-1.		D Aherne 1-0, J Horgan 1-0, C Clancy 0-3.	Referee: M O'Flaherty (Blackrock)

5 May 1984 Second round	Blackrock	3-18 - 2-04	Avondhu	Páirc Uí Chaoimh
	T Lyons 2-3, D Buckley 0-5, É O'Donoghue 1-1, D Mac Curtain 0-3, J Cashman 0-2, T Deasy 0-1, P Fitzgerald 0-1, F Cummins 0-1.		P Shanahan 1-2, G Hayes 1-0, M Gowan 0-1, G Greely 0-1.	Referee: M Keane (Cloughduv)

5 May 1984 Second round	Carbery	3-13 - 0-04	Nemo Rangers	Jack Barrett Park
	P Crowley 2-6, B Lordan 1-0, E Kenneally 0-3, P O'Donovan 0-2, N Crowley 0-1, T Crowley 0-1.		T Nation 0-3, D O'Brien 0-1.	Referee: D Collins (Kinsale)

6 May 1984 Second round	Newtownshandrum	3-12 - 1-12	Carrigdhoun	Castletownroche
	J Coughlan 2-8, J Buckley 1-0, D Herlihy 0-2, G Morrissey 0-2.		J Drinan 0-6, B Scanlon 1-0, A O'Driscoll 0-2, J Dineen 0-1, B O'Sullivan 0-1, T O'Donovan 0-1, S McCarthy 0-1.	Referee: D O'Connor (Bishopstown)

13 May 1984 Second round	Duhallow	2-09 - 3-08	Sarsfields	Castletownroche
	P Field 1-2, O Kearney 0-4, D Fitzpatrick 1-0, D O'Sullivan 0-2, J O'Sullivan 0-1.		P O'Riordan 1-2, B Dineen 1-0, G Mcevoy 1-0, B Lotty 0-2, B Óg Murphy 0-2, D Murphy 0-1, T Murphy 0-1.

19 May 1984 Second round	Ballyhea	3-16 - 2-05	Seandún	Carrowkeel Pitch
	W Shanahan 1-4, L O'Halloran 1-3, D Hanley 1-0, A Morrissey 0-3, F Ryan 0-3, J O'Connor 0-2, L O'Connor 0-1.		P Walsh 2-3, C Coffey 0-2.	Referee: R Murphy

9 June 1984 Second round	Muskerry	1-14 - 2-07	Youghal	Páirc Uí Chaoimh
	M Malone 1-4, D Desmond 0-3, J O'Leary 0-2, MP Buckley 0-2, T Barry-Murphy 0-1, P McDonnell 0-1, M McDonnell 0-1.		T Coyne 2-3, M Coyne 0-2, S O'Leary 0-1, P Grace 0-1.	Referee: D O'Connor

10 June 1984 Second round	St. Finbarr's	4-11 - 2-09	Na Piarsaigh	Páirc Uí Chaoimh
	J Meyler 2-1, D Walsh 0-5, É Fitzpatrick 1-0, M Higgins 1-0 (og), J Barry-Murphy 0-3, J Cremin 0-2.		T O'Sullivan 0-5, M O'Sullivan 1-0, John O'Sullivan 1-0, L Ford 0-3, W O'Connell 0-1.	Referee: M Flaherty (Blackrock)

=== Quarter-finals ===
10 June 1984 Quarter-final	Ballyhea	0-15 - 1-08	Newtownshandrum	Dr. Mannix Sportsfield
	W Shanahan 0-6, A Morrissey 0-3, G O'Connor 0-2, D Ryan 0-2, L O'Connor 0-1, C Brassill 0-1.		J Coughlan 0-5, J Buckley 1-0, P Herlihy 0-3.

10 June 1984 Quarter-final	Blackrock	4-18 - 0-07	Carbery	Cloughduv
	D Buckley 2-4, M Kilcoyne 1-2, T Cashman 0-5, T Lyons 1-1, J Cashman 0-3, F Delaney 0-2, T Deasy 0-1.		E Kenneally 0-2, D Healy 0-2, F O'Regan 0-1, R Wilmot 0-1, B Whelton 0-1.	Referee: M Keane

27 July 1984 Quarter-final	St. Finbarr's	1-17 - 1-13	Midleton	Páirc Uí Chaoimh
	D Walsh 0-10, É Fitzpatrick 1-1, F Ramsey 0-2, J Barry-Murphy 0-1, J Meyler 0-1, C Ryan 0-1, T Finn 0-1.		J Fenton 0-7, G Fitzgerald 1-2, D Boylan 0-2, J Boylan 0-1, J Hartnett 0-1.	Referee: S O'Grady (Limerick)

28 July 1984 Quarter-final	Sarsfields	3-12 - 3-08	Muskerry	Páirc Uí Chaoimh
	P O'Riordan 3-2, B Óg Murphy 0-6, T McCarthy 0-2, T McAuliffe 0-1, B Dineen 0-1.		J O'Leary 1-2, MP Buckley 1-2, P O'Connell 0-4, D Desmond 1-0.	Referee: W Horgan (Brian Dillons)

=== Semi-finals ===
16 September 1984 Semi-final	Sarsfields	1-10 - 0-13	Ballyhea	Páirc Uí Chaoimh
	T O'Sullivan 1-2, B Óg Murphy 0-4, M Carroll 0-2, P O'Riordan 0-1, T McCarthy 0-1.		W Shanahan 0-6, D Ryan 0-3, A Morrissey 0-2, D O'Flynn 0-1, G O'Connor 0-1.	Referee: M O'Flaherty (Blackrock)

16 September 1984 Semi-final	St. Finbarr's	4-09 - 2-10	Blackrock	Páirc Uí Chaoimh
	C Ryan 3-1, J Barry-Murphy 1-0, D Walsh 0-4, J Cremin 0-2, T Maher 0-1, T Finn 0-1.		D Buckley 1-6, J Cashman 1-0, T Cashman 0-2, É O'Donoghue 0-1, P Moylan 0-1.

22 September 1984 Semi-final replay	Ballyhea	5-08 - 2-08	Sarsfields	Páirc Uí Chaoimh
	D Ryan 3-1, D O'Flynn 2-2, C Brassill 0-2, W Shanahan 0-1, J O'Callaghan 0-1, D Hanley 0-1.		B Óg Murphy 0-6, T O'Sullivan 1-0, T Murphy 1-0, D Kenneally 0-1, G McEvoy 0-1.	Referee: M O'Flaherty (Blackrock)

=== Final ===
30 September 1984 Final	St. Finbarr's	1-15 - 2-04	Ballyhea	Páirc Uí Chaoimh
	D Walsh 0-6, J Meyler 1-0, J Cremin 0-3, J Barry-Murphy 0-2, T Finn 0-2, C Ryan 0-1, F Ramsey 0-1.		W Shanahan 2-3, C Brassill 0-1.	Referee: M O'Flaherty (Blackrock)

== Championship statistics ==
=== Top scorers ===
Top scorers overall

Rank	Player	Club	Tally	Total	Matches	Average
1	Denis Walsh	St. Finbarr's	0-31	31	5	6.20
2	Willie Shanahan	Ballyhea	3-20	29	5	5.80
3	Danny Buckley	Blackrock	3-15	24	3	8.00
4	James Coughlan	Newtownshandrum	2-13	19	2	9.50
5	Bertie Óg Murphy	Sarsfields	0-18	18	4	4.50
6	Paul O'Riordan	Sarsfields	4-05	17	3	5.66
6	Christy Ryan	St. Finbarr's	3-08	17	5	3.40
8	Dave Ryan	Ballyhea	3-06	15	5	3.00
8	Tony Coyne	Youghal	3-06	15	2	7.50
8	John Fenton	Midleton	0-15	15	2	7.50

Top scorers in a single game

Rank	Player	Club	Tally	Total	Opposition
1	James Coughlan	Newtownshandrum	2-08	14	Carrigdhoun
2	Pádraig Crowley	Carbery	2-06	12	Nemo Rangers
3	Kevin Hennessy	Midleton	3-02	11	Imokilly
3	Paul O'Riordan	Sarsfields	3-02	11	Muskerry
5	Christy Ryan	St. Finbarr's	3-01	10	Blackrock
5	Dave Ryan	Ballyhea	3-01	10	Sarsfields
5	Danny Buckley	Blackrock	2-04	10	Carbery
5	Denis Walsh	St. Finbarr's	0-10	10	Midleton
9	Kevin Keane	Seandún	3-00	9	University College Cork
9	Dave Boylan	Midleton	3-00	9	Imokilly
9	Pat Walsh	Seandún	2-03	9	Ballyhea
9	Tony Coyne	Youghal	2-03	9	Muskerry
9	Tom Lyons	Blackrock	2-03	9	Avondhu
9	Willie Shanahan	Ballyhea	2-03	9	St. Finbarr's
9	Danny Buckley	Blackrock	1-06	9	St. Finbarr's
