= St Finbarr's National Hurling & Football Club =

Gaelic games club in County Cork, Ireland

St Finbarr's
- Cumann Náisiúnta Fionnbarra Naofa
- Founded: 1876
- County: Cork
- Nickname: The Barrs
- Colours
- Grounds: Neenan Park
- Coordinates: 51°52′38.8″N 8°29′50.8″W

Playing kits
Hurling kit	Football kit

Senior Club Championships
	All Ireland	Munster champions	Cork champions
Football:	3	5	11
Hurling:	2	4	26
Camogie:	0	2	4

St Finbarr's National Hurling & Football Club or St Finbarr's Hurling and Football Club is a Gaelic games club based in the Togher area of Cork city, County Cork, Ireland. Playing in royal blue and gold jerseys, St Finbarr's fields teams in the sports of Gaelic football, hurling and camogie.

== Foundation ==
Located in the suburb of Togher, on the southside of Cork, St Finbarr's National Hurling & Football Club was active in the years before the foundation of the Gaelic Athletic Association. Reports of a series of victories point to the fact that the club was established in 1876. St Finbarr's, along with a number of other clubs, broke away from the Cork County Board in 1889 and played in the O'Connor Board. The club returned to the official county board in 1891, however, another split resulted in a number of players defecting to the Redmonds club.

== Hurling ==
=== Hurling history ===
St Finbarr's won their first Cork SHC after a one-point defeat of local rivals Redmonds in 1899. This was followed by three successive titles between 1904 and 1906. St Finbarr's once again regained the title in 1919, after a lapse of 13 years, and ushered in the club's most dominant era up to that point when six Cork SHC titles were won from nine final appearances between 1919 and 1934.

The 1940s saw St Finbarr's share every available Cork SHC title with northside rivals Glen Rovers. Four titles were won between 1942 and 1947, with a team featuring Seán Condon, Jim Buttimer and Mick Kenefick. The club claimed their 15th Cork SHC title after a replay defeat of Glen Rovers in 1955, in front of a then-record crowd of 31,019.

After a 10-year absence, St Finbarr's returned to claim the Cork SHC title in 1965 with a young team, which included Charlie and Gerald McCarthy, Tony Maher and Con Roche. The following 17 years saw the club go through its most successful era, with seven Cork SHC titles being won in total, including a 1977 final defeat of Glen Rovers in front of an all-time record attendance of 34,151. Four Munster Club SHC titles were also won, while St Finbarr's won two All-Ireland Club SHC titles after defeats of Fenians (1975) and Rathnure (1978).

St Finbarr's ended the 1980s with five Cork SHC titles in total, before winning their 25th title after a defeat of Carbery in 1993. This was the club's last Cork SHC title until 2022 when, after a 29-year absence, St Finbarr's beat Blackrock by 2–14 to 1–07.

=== Hurling honours ===
- All-Ireland Senior Club Hurling Championship (2): 1975, 1978
- Munster Senior Club Hurling Championship (4): 1968, 1974, 1977, 1980
- Cork Senior Hurling Championship (26): 1899, 1904, 1905, 1906, 1919, 1922, 1923, 1926, 1932, 1933, 1942, 1943, 1946, 1947, 1955, 1965, 1968, 1974, 1977, 1980, 1981, 1982, 1984, 1988, 1993, 2022
- Cork Intermediate Hurling Championship (1): 1990
- Cork Junior Hurling Championship (3): 1902, 1903, 1956
- Cork City Junior Hurling Championship (12): 1927, 1940, 1941, 1942, 1955, 1956, 1972, 1981, 1985, 1990, 2004, 2014
- Cork Junior B Inter-Divisional Hurling Championship (1): 2015
- Cork Premier Under-21 A Hurling Championship (5): 1985, 1990, 1991, 1992, 1994
- Cork Minor Hurling Championship (15): 1909, 1939, 1940, 1941, 1947, 1948, 1975, 1980, 1986, 1990, 1991, 1992, 1993, 1997, 2020

=== Camogie honours ===
- Munster Senior Club Camogie Championship (2): 2025, 2026
- Cork Senior Camogie Championship (4): 2006, 2024, 2025, 2026

=== Notable hurlers ===
- Dinny Barry-Murphy: All-Ireland SHC-winning captain (1929)
- Seán Condon: All-Ireland SHC-winning captain (1944)
- Ger Cunningham: Hurler of the Year (1986)
- Mick Kenefick: All-Ireland SHC-winning captain (1943)
- Charlie McCarthy: All-Ireland SHC-winning captain (1978)
- Gerald McCarthy: All-Ireland SHC-winning captain (1966)

=== Hurling managers ===
Manager	Years
John Cremin	2013-2015
Tim Finn	2015-2017
Ronan Curran	2017-2019
Aidan Fitzpatrick	2019–2020
John Cremin	2020
Ronan Curran	2020–2021
Ger Cunningham	2022–2025
Paudie Murray	2025–present

== Football ==
=== Football history ===
Although regarded as a hurling club, St Finbarr's made a Gaelic football breakthrough in 1956 when the beat Millstreet to win their maiden Cork SFC title. The club retained the title in 1957, before winning a third in four years after a defeat of Macroom in 1959.

St Finbarr's won their fifth Cork SFC title when, in 1976, they beat St Michael's by three points in the final. This began a hugely successful decade, with the club claiming five Cork SFC titles in total during that period. These titles were subsequently converted into four Munster Club SFC titles, while St Finbarr's won three All-Ireland Club SFC titles, following defeats of St Grellan's (1980), Walterstown (1981) and Clann na nGael (1987).

After more than 70 years in the top flight of Cork football, St Finbarr's were relegated after a defeat by Douglas in 2007. The club made an immediate return after beating St Vincent's to win the Cork PIFC title in 2008. St Finbarr's brought their Cork SFC title tally to 10 after victories in 2018 and 2021, with a new team featuring Ian Maguire, Steven Sherlock and Brian Hayes. A fifth Munster Club SFC title was also won, following a defeat of Austin Stacks in the final.

=== Football honours ===
- All-Ireland Senior Club Football Championship (3): 1980, 1981, 1987
- Munster Senior Club Football Championship (5): 1979, 1980, 1982, 1986, 2021
- Cork Premier Senior Football Championship (11): 1956, 1957, 1959, 1976, 1979, 1980, 1982, 1985, 2018, 2021, 2025
- Kelleher Shield (Senior Football League) (11): 1973, 1981, 1983, 1984, 1987, 1989, 1990, 2019, 2021, 2023, 2025
- Cork Premier Intermediate Football Championship (1): 2008
- Cork Premier Junior Football Championship (1): 2023
- Cork City Junior Football Championship (9): 1941, 1947, 1951, 1960, 1961, 1988, 2011, 2013, 2014
- Cork Under-21 Football Championship (7): 1973, 1977, 1978, 1985, 1986, 2008, 2016
- Cork Minor Football Championship (25): 1941, 1942, 1944, 1950, 1959, 1961, 1962, 1963, 1968, 1971, 1973, 1975, 1977, 1982, 1983, 1984, 1985, 1996, 1997, 2007, 2009, 2010, 2015, 2021

=== Notable footballers ===
- Dave Barry: All-Ireland SFC-winner (1989, 1990)
- Jimmy Barry-Murphy: All-Ireland SFC-winner (1973)
- John Kerins: All-Ireland SFC-winner (1989, 1990)
- Christy Ryan: National Football League-winning captain (1979–80).
- Michael Shields: All-Ireland SFC-winner (2010)

=== Football managers ===
Manager	Years
Ray Keane	2016–2018
Paul O'Keeffe	2019–2023
Brian Roche	2024–present

== Grounds ==
The club's home ground is Neenan Park. It is named in honour of Connie Neenan, a former St Finbarr's player who later emigrated to the United States, became a successful businessman and provided an interest-free loan to the club to help with the purchase of the land for a new playing field. The official opening took place in September 1962.

== See also ==
- Blackrock–St Finbarr's hurling rivalry
- Glen Rovers–St Finbarr's hurling rivalry
