= 1979–80 All-Ireland Senior Club Football Championship =

Irish Football Championship

- Dates: 23 September 1979 – 25 May 1980
- Teams: 33
- Champions: St Finbarr's (1st title); Christy Ryan (captain); Pat Lougheed (manager)
- Runners-up: St Grellan's

Tournament statistics
- Matches played: 34
- Top scorer(s): Matt Connor (2-25)

The 1979–80 All-Ireland Senior Club Football Championship was the 10th staging of the All-Ireland Senior Club Football Championship since its establishment by the Gaelic Athletic Association in 1970-71.

Nemo Rangers entered the championship as the defending champions, however, they failed to qualify after being beaten by Castlehaven in the 1979 Cork SFC semi-final.

On 25 May 1980, St Finbarr's won the championship following a 3-9 to 0-8 defeat of St Grellan's in the All-Ireland final at Seán Treacy Park. It was their first ever championship title.

Matt Connor of Walsh Island was the competition's top scorer, finishing with 2-25.

== Connacht ==
=== Quarter-final ===
23 September 1979 Quarter-final	St Mary's	0-08 - 3-13	Garrymore	MacHale Park
	H Mannix 0-3, B Fitzpatrick 0-2, T Welsh 0-1, P Flannery 0-1, P Dixon 0-1.		Jim Kent 0-7, John Kent 1-2, E Delahunt 1-2, M Walsh 1-1, M Laffey 0-1.

=== Semi-finals ===
18 November 1979 Semi-final	St Mary's	0-07 - 1-03	Clann na nGael	Markievicz Park
	John Kent 0-3, E Delahunt 0-1, M Laffey 0-1, B Murphy 0-1, E McHale 0-1.		P Cunniffe 1-0, T McHale 0-2, P Hynes 0-1.

18 November 1979 Semi-final	Ballinamore Seán O'Heslin's	2-05 - 1-12	St Grellan's	Seán O'Heslin Memorial Park
	G Reynolds 1-1, G Darcy 1-0, P Dolan 0-2, S Crossan 0-1, O Honeyman 0-1.		P McGettigan 0-7, S Ridell 1-0, C Loftus 0-2, J Whelan 0-1, B Brennan 0-1.

=== Final ===
2 December 1979 Final	St Mary's	0-04 - 0-04	St Grellan's	Markievicz Park
	M Laffey 0-2, E McHale 0-2.		P Cunningham 0-1, C Loftus 0-1, J Manton 0-1, P McGettigan 0-1.

10 February 1980 Final replay	St Grellan's	0-09 - 0-08	St Mary's	Dunlo GAA Grounds
	J Manton 0-3, P McGettigan 0-2, G Gibbons 0-2, M Cunningham 0-1, K Mitchell 0-1.		M Laffey 0-2, John Kent 0-2, Jim Kent 0-1, B Murphy 0-1, E McHale 0-1, G Monaghan 0-1.

== Leinster ==
=== First round ===
21 October 1979 First round	Castletown	0-04 - 1-12	Raheens	Gorey
	J Flanagan 0-4.		G Power 1-4, P Campbell 0-2, S Power 0-2, M Lynch 0-1, N Byrne 0-1, D Flaherty 0-1, M Mullins 0-1.

21 October 1979 First round	Tinryland	2-22 - 2-04	O'Loughlin Gaels	Dr Cullen Park
	P O'Neill 1-6, T O'Neill 1-3, P Delaney 0-4, T Dwyer 0-2, M Murphy 0-2, D Byrne 0-2, N Deane 0-2, T Darcy 0-1.		M Cleere 1-1, J Mulcahy 1-0, O Bergin 0-2, M McGrath 0-1.

28 October 1979 First round	Walsh Island	0-11 - 0-09	Na Fianna	O'Connor Park
	Matt Connor 0-6, L Connor 0-1, Séamus Connor 0-1, E Mulhall 0-1, Murt Connor 0-1, M Slattery 0-1.		R Neville 0-6, J Caffrey 0-1, D Gaffney 0-1, C McCarthy 0-1.

4 November 1979 First round	Navan O'Mahonys	1-10 - 1-11	Portlaoise	Páirc Tailteann
	M Downes 1-6, D Dalton 0-2, R Collins 0-1, E Dunphy 0-1.		J Browne 1-4, C Browne 0-3, M Dooley 0-1, T Prendergast 0-1, L Scully 0-1, N Prendergast 0-1.

=== Quarter-finals ===
4 November 1979 Quarter-final	Tinryland	0-07 - 2-06	Young Irelands	Dr Cullen Park
	P Delaney 0-3, P O'Neill 0-2, D Byrne 0-1, L Foster 0-1.		P McGreevy 1-3, G Nixon 1-1, E McCartan 0-2.

4 November 1979 Quarter-final	Raheens	1-09 - 1-10	Baltinglass	St Conleth's Park
	S Power 1-1, N Byrne 0-1, M Lynch 0-1, J Winders 0-1, P Winders 0-1, B Power 0-1, P Campbell 0-1, M Jullens 0-1, G Power 0-1.		P Burke 0-6, R McHugh 1-0, T Murphy 0-1, M O'Neill 0-1, C Murphy 0-1, M Owens 0-1.

4 November 1979 Quarter-final	Walsh Island	0-10 - 1-02	Athlone	O'Connor Park
	Matt Connor 0-4, R Connor 0-3, Murt Connor 0-1, T Mulhall 0-1, E Mulhall 0-1.		J Keane 1-1, P McCormack 0-1.

18 November 1979 Quarter-final	Portlaoise	1-12 - 0-05	Longford Slashers	O'Moore Park
	G Browne 0-5, T Prendergast 1-1, L Scully 0-1, G Phelan 0-1, M Dooley 0-1, C Browne 0-1, N Prendergast 0-1, B Bohane 0-1.		M Farrell 0-2, G Neenaghan 0-1, B King 0-1, D Murphy 0-1.

=== Semi-finals ===
17 November 1979 Semi-final	Walsh Island	2-15 - 1-02	Young Irelands	Páirc Tailteann
	Matt Connor 1-6, E Mulhall 1-1, L Connor 0-2, M Slattery 0-2, Seán Connor 0-1, W Connor 0-1, R Connor 0-1, Murt Connor 0-1.		M McCabe 1-0, M McGeary 0-1, K Maguire 0-1.

1 December 1979 Semi-final	Portlaoise	2-15 - 0-09	Baltinglass	Geraldine Park
	T Prendergast 1-3, L Scully 1-2, G Browne 0-4, N Prendergast 0-3, M Dooley 0-1, G Phelan 0-1, J Harding 0-1.		T Murphy 0-3, R McHugh 0-2, B Timmins 0-1, P Burke 0-1, M O'Neill 0-1, M Owen 0-1.

=== Final ===
23 March 1980 Final	Walsh Island	3-02 - 1-06	Portlaoise	Geraldine Park
	Matt Connor 1-2, E Mulhall 1-0, F Williamson 1-0.		N Prendergast 1-0, C Browne 0-2, L Scully 0-2, T Prendergast 0-1, G Browne 0-1.

== Munster ==
=== Quarter-finals ===
4 November 1979 Quarter-final	Oola	1-06 - 2-08	Loughmore–Castleiney	Fr Hayes Memorial Park
	J Ryan 0-4, D Fitzgibbon 1-0, D Burke 0-1, D Fitzgerald 0-1.		M McGrath 1-2, T McGrath 0-4, J Maher 1-0, P McGrath 0-1, S Kearney 0-1.

10 November 1979 Quarter-final	Austin Stacks	0-09 - 1-10	Kilrush Shamrocks	Austin Stack Park
	M Sheehy 0-3, G Power 0-2, JL McElligott 0-1, J O'Keeffe 0-1, T Sheehan 0-1, D Long 0-1.		A Moloney 0-4, M O'Reilly 1-0, J O'Halloran 0-3, M Fennelly 0-1, S Moloney 0-1, S Hehir 0-1.

=== Semi-finals ===
18 November 1979 Semi-final	Kilrush Shamrocks	5-06 - 1-07	Ballinacourty	Tubridy Memorial Park
	A Mooney 3-0, S Moloney 1-1, J Hehir 1-0, J O'Halloran 0-3, M Fennell 0-1, M O'Reilly 0-1.		J O'Dwyer 0-5, J Kiely 1-0, J Burns 0-1, S Fitzgerald 0-1.

18 November 1979 Semi-final	St Finbarr's	1-09 - 0-06	Loughmore–Castleiney	Páirc Shíleáin
	J Barry-Murphy 1-3, F O'Mahony 0-4, R Kenny 0-1, G McCarthy 0-1.		M McGrath 0-2, T McGrath 0-1, E Brennan 0-1, M Kiely 0-1, T Kiely 0-1.

=== Final ===
1 December 1979 Final	St Finbarr's	0-10 - 0-04	Kilrush Shamrocks	Páirc Uí Chaoimh
	F Twomey 0-2, J Allen 0-2, G McCarthy 0-2, F O'Mahony 0-1, J Barry-Murphy 0-1, M Lynch 0-1, R Kenny 0-1.		J O'Halloran 0-3, S Moloney 0-1.

== Ulster ==
=== Preliminary round ===
28 October 1979 Preliminary round	Castlewellan	2-08 - 0-07	Laragh United	St. Malachy's Park
	P McGeown 1-1, C McGreevy 1-0, C McAlarney 0-2, B Toner 0-2, C Crilly 0-1, D Keown 0-1, B McAleenan 0-1.		D Donohue 0-4, J Carroll 0-1, A King 0-1, H Brady 0-1.

=== Quarter-finals ===
23 September 1979 Quarter-final	Scotstown	3-09 - 1-04	Carrickmore St Colmcille's	St Tiernach's Park
	R McDermott 1-2, J McCabe 1-2, T Moyna 1-1, S McCarville 0-3, N Moyna 0-1.		V Woods 1-0, M Harte 0-2, M Kelly 0-1, L Kelly 0-1.

14 October 1979 Quarter-final	Bellaghy	0-12 - 2-03	Erne Gaels	Dean McGlinchey Park
	P McKiernan 0-5, F O'Loane 0-3, L Diamond 0-2, P Doherty 0-1, D McMullan 0-1.		PJ Daly 1-2, P McCann 1-0, A McCafferty 0-1.

14 October 1979 Quarter-final	St Teresa's	2-11 - 1-11	Bundoran	Casement Park
	P McGoldrick 1-1, D Maguire 0-4, G Maguire 1-0, P Magorrian 0-3, S Burns 0-1, P McCarron 0-1, J McLoughlin 0-1.		S Reilly 0-5, F Lynch 1-0, M Bourke 0-3, B Moohan 0-1, B Gavigan 0-1, J Gavigan 0-1.

4 November 1979 Quarter-final	Castlewellan	2-06 - 2-06	St Patrick's Carrickcruppen	St Malachy's Park

18 November 1979 Quarter-final replay	St Patrick's Carrickcruppen	1-07 - 0-08	Castlewellan	Páirc Naomh Pádraig
	P Loughran 0-4, K McCabe 1-0, P Trainor 0-3.		A King 0-3, H Toner 0-2, G Doherty 0-1, C McAlarney 0-1, T McArdle 0-1.

=== Semi-finals ===
28 October 1979 Semi-final	Bellaghy	0-08 - 0-11	Scotstown	Dean McGlinchey Park
	P McKiernan 0-3, H McGoldrick 0-2, F O'Loane 0-1, P Doherty 0-1.		J McCabe 0-5, Séamus McCarville 0-2, G McCarville 0-2, N Moyna 0-1, C Morgan 0-1.

2 December 1979 Semi-final	St Teresa's	1-07 - 2-08	St Patrick's Carrickcruppen	Casement Park
	P McGorrian 1-0, D Maguire 0-2, G Maguire 0-2, T Maguire 0-1, J McKiernan 0-1.		P Loughran 0-5, L McCabe 1-0, M McPartland 1-0, P Trainor 0-2, J Loughran 0-1.

=== Final ===
9 March 1980 Final	Scotstown	0-09 - 0-08	St Patrick's Carrickcruppen	Fr. Peter Campbell Park
	J McCabe 0-3, Seán McCarville 0-2, N Moyna 0-1, Séamus McCarville 0-1, C Morgan 0-1, T Moyna 0-1.		P Loughran 0-3, P Trainor 0-2, B Canavan 0-2, M McParland 0-1.

== Quarter-final ==
6 April 1980 Quarter-final	St Finbarr's	3-17 - 1-03	Kingdom Kerry Gaels	Páirc Uí Chaoimh
	J Allen 2-4, J O'Callaghan 0-6, J Barry-Murphy 1-1, D Barry 0-2, P O'Mahony 0-2, F Twomey 0-1, M Lynch 0-1.		J O'Shea 1-2, J Broderick 0-1.

== Semi-finals ==
4 May 1980 Semi-final	St Grellan's	1-11 - 1-08	Walsh Island	Dunlo GAA Grounds
	K Mitchell 1-3, G Gibbons 0-3, B Brennan 0-2, P McGettigan 0-2, C Loftus 0-1.		Matt Connor 0-7, Murt Connor 1-0, E Mulhall 0-1.

11 May 1980 Semi-final	Scotstown	0-04 - 0-07	St Finbarr's	St Tiernach's Park
	J McCabe 0-2, C Morgan 0-1, G McCarville 0-1.		J O'Callaghan 0-4, F Twomey 0-1, R Kenny 0-1, M Lynch 0-1.

== Final ==
25 May 1980 Final	St Finbarr's	3-09 - 0-08	St Grellan's	Seán Treacy Park
	J O'Callaghan 2-3, F O'Mahony 1-0, R Kenny 0-2, J Allen 0-2, M Lynch 0-1, C Ryan 0-1.		P McGettigan 0-3, M Cunningham 0-1, J Whelan 0-1, B Brennan 0-1, P Cunningham 0-1, J Manton 0-1.

== Statistics ==
=== Top scorers ===
Rank	Player	Club	Tally	Total	Matches	Average
1	Matt Connor	Walsh Island	2-25	31	5	6.20
2	James O'Callaghan	St Finbarr's	2-13	19	3	6.33
3	Gerry Browne	Portlaoise	1-14	17	4	4.25

=== Miscellaneous ===
- St Grellan's won the Connacht Club SFC title for the first time.
