= Aidan Fitzpatrick (hurler) =

Irish hurler and coach

Personal information
- Native name: Aodán Mac Gearailt (Irish)
- Nickname: Fitzy
- Born: 1982 (age 43–44) Togher, Cork, Ireland
- Occupation: Mason
- Height: 5 ft 10 in (178 cm)

Sport
- Sport: Hurling
- Position: Right corner-back
Club
- Years: Club
- 1999-2015: St Finbarr's
Club titles
- Cork titles: 0
Inter-county
- Years: County
- 2003-2004: Cork
Inter-county titles
- Munster titles: 1
- All-Irelands: 0
- NHL: 0
- All Stars: 0

Aidan Fitzpatrick (born 1980) is an Irish hurling coach and former player. At club level, he played with St Finabrr's and at inter-county level with the Cork senior hurling team.

== Playing career ==
Born in Togher, Fitzpatrick's father, Éamonn, played hurling at all levels with Cork and won two All-Ireland Club SHC medals with St Finbarr's. Aidan Fitzpatrick was educated at Coláiste Chríost Rí and played in several grades of hurling and Gaelic football during his time there. He won consecutive Corn Uí Mhuirí medals in 1997 and 1998.

Fitzpatrick first played for the St Finbarr's club as a dual player at juvenile and underage levels. He won a Cork Premier MFC title in 1996, following a defeat of Carrigaline in the final. He claimed a second consecutive title in 1997, as well as winning a Cork Premier MHC medal after beating Newtownshandrum. Fitzpatrick made his senior team debut in 1999.

At inter-county level, Fitzpatrick first played for Cork at minor level in 1998. He won a Munster MHC medal that year before later lining out at wing-back in the 2–15 to 1–09 defeat of Kilkenny in the 1998 All-Ireland MHC final. His tenure with the under-21 team ended without silverware. Fitzpatrick was drafted onto the senior team in January 2003. He was a non-playing substitute when Cork beat Kilkenny by 0–17 to 0–09 in the 2004 All-Ireland final.

== Management career ==
Fitzpatrick succeeded Ronan Curran as manager of the St Finbarr's senior hurling team in December 2019. He stepped down after defeats to Glen Rovers and Na Piarsaigh in the 2020 Cork Premier SHC.

== Honours ==
Coláiste Chríost Rí

- Corn Uí Mhuirí: 1997, 1998

St Finbarr's

- Cork Inter-Divisional Junior B Hurling Championship: 2015
- Cork Premier Minor Hurling Championship: 1997
- Cork Premier Minor Football Championship: 1996, 1997

Cork

- Munster Senior Hurling Championship: 2004
- All-Ireland Minor Hurling Championship: 1998
- Munster Minor Hurling Championship: 1998
