= 1981 Cork Senior Hurling Championship =

Annual hurling competition season

- Dates: 10 May – 13 September 1981
- Teams: 17
- Champions: St. Finbarr's (21st title); Dónal O'Grady (captain); Gerald McCarthy (manager)
- Runners-up: Glen Rovers; Teddy O'Brien (captain); Jerry O'Sullivan (manager)

Tournament statistics
- Matches played: 16
- Goals scored: 68 (4.25 per match)
- Points scored: 305 (19.06 per match)
- Top scorer(s): Christy Ryan (6-05)

The 1981 Cork Senior Hurling Championship was the 93rd staging of the Cork Senior Hurling Championship since its establishment by the Cork County Board in 1887. The championship began on 10 May 1981 and ended on 13 September 1981.

St. Finbarr's entered the championship as the defending champions.

The final was played on 13 September 1981 at Páirc Uí Chaoimh in Cork, between St. Finbarr's and Glen Rovers, in what was their second successive meeting in the final. St. Finbarr's won the match by 1–12 to 1–09 to claim their 21st championship title overall and a second successive title.

Christy Ryan was the championship's top scorer with 6-05.

== Format change ==
At the County Convention on 25 January 1981, it was decided to end the three-year experiment of playing the championship on a league basis in the preliminary rounds and reverted to an open, seeded draw. The four semi-finalists from the 1980 championship (Midleton, Blackrock, St. Finbarr's and Glen Rovers) were the four seeded teams and were separated in the quarter-final stage.

== Team changes ==
=== To Championship ===
Promoted from the Cork Intermediate Hurling Championship

- Ballyhea

== Results ==
First round

10 May 1981 First round	Avondhu	0-10 - 2-10	Éire Óg	Banteer
	D Coughlan 0-3, J Buckley 0-2, J Dennehy 0-2, P Shanahan 0-1, D Relihan 0-1, D Herlihy 0-1.		S O'Leary 1-4, D Desmond 0-2, M Flynn 0-1, D Flynn 0-1.	Referee: M O'Flaherty (Blackrock)

Second round

10 May 1981 Second round	University College Cork	6-11 - 2-02	Carbery	Liam MacCarthy Park, B'garvan
	F Ryan 2-1, P O'Leary 1-4, G Motherway 2-0, White 1-2, N English 0-2, G Sheehan 0-1, T Coakley 0-1.		D Healy 1-1, F O'Leary 1-0, P Crowley 0-1.	Referee: T Linehan (Inniscarra)

17 May 1981 Second round	Sarsfields	1-18 - 1-06	Seandún	Riverstown
	B Óg Murphy 0-8, E Kelleher 0-7, T Fitzgerald 1-0, B Lotty 0-1, S Farrell 0-1, J Hartigan 0-1.		P O'Sullivan 1-3, W McCarthy 0-2, S Lucey 0-1.	Referee: M Keane (Cloughduv)

24 May 1981 Second round	Glen Rovers	2-14 - 1-06	Imokilly	Páirc Uí Chaoimh, Cork
	T O'Neill 1-3, P Ring 0-6, P Horgan 1-2, J Hannigan 0-2, T Collins 0-1.		D Ahern 1-0, M Ahern 0-2, W Cashman 0-2, K Lane 0-1, T Collins 0-1.	Referee: M O'Flaherty (Blackrock)

24 May 1981 Second round	Youghal	1-13 - 1-06	Éire Óg	Páirc Uí Chaoimh, Cork
	T Coyne 0-6, M Butler 1-1, P Grace 0-2, S O'Leary 0-1, S Ring 0-1, P Coyne 0-1, R Swayne 0-1.		D Desmond 0-4, C Malone 1-0, J Flynn 0-1, J O'Leary 0-1.	Referee: F Murphy (Blackrock)

24 May 1981 Second round	Blackrock	3-15 - 2-06	Muskerry	Cloughduv
	R Cummins 2-0, P Moylan 0-6, É O'Sullivan 1-1, M Kilcoyne 0-3, É O'Donoghue 0-3, D Buckley 0-1, T Cashman 0-1.		C Kelly 2-2, M Ring 0-1, D Walsh 0-1, J Coakley 0-1, P Connell 0-1.	Referee: N Hallihan (Bandon)

5 June 1981 Second round	St. Finbarr's	5-08 - 4-09	Na Piarsaigh	Páirc Uí Chaoimh, Cork
	C Ryan 3-3, É Fitzpatrick 1-1, T Maher 1-0, C McCarthy 0-2, J Meyler 0-1, B O'Brien 0-1.		L O'Callaghan 2-1, P Barry 1-3, T O'Sullivan 1-2, John O'Sullivan 0-2, R McDonnell 0-1.	Referee: F Murphy (Blackrock)

21 June 1981 Second round	Midleton	1-12 - 0-09	Carrigdhoun	Clonmult Memorial Park, Midleton
	K Hennessy 1-0, J Fenton 0-3, G Glavin 0-3, P Hartnett 0-2, S O'Brien 0-2, D Mulcahy 0-1, S O'Farrell 0-1.		F Coleman 0-2, G Hanley 0-2, J O'Donovan 0-2, J Reynolds 0-1, M Fitzpatrick 0-1, D Dunne 0-1.	Referee: D O'Connor (Bishopstown)

23 May 1981 Second round	Nemo Rangers	2-07 - 4-10	Ballyhea	Castletownroche

Quarter-finals

19 June 1981 Quarter-final	St. Finbarr's	2-09 - 0-05	University College Cork	Páirc Uí Chaoimh, Cork
	C McCarthy 1-4, C Ryan 1-0, J Meyler 0-2, J Barry-Murphy 0-1, J Cremin 0-1, J Allen 0-1.		T Coakley 0-2, N English 0-1, M O'Donoghue 0-1, J Sheehan 0-1.

21 June 1981 Quarter-final	Glen Rovers	4-09 - 1-04 (declared void)	Youghal	Clonmult Memorial Park, Midleton

28 June 1981 Quarter-final	Blackrock	4-13 - 3-05	Ballyhea	Pirc Mac Gearailt, Fermoy
	R Cummins 2-1, E O'Sullivan 1-1, É O'Donoghue 1-1, D Buckley 0-4, T Cashman 0-3, T Deasy 0-2, P Moylan 0-1.			Referee: J Motherway (Aghada)

18 July 1981 Quarter-final replay	Glen Rovers	0-11 - 0-07	Youghal	Clonmult Memorial Park, Midleton
	P Horgan 0-6, J Hannigan 0-1, R Whitley 0-1, J Buckley 0-1, T Collins 0-1, P Ring 0-1.		P Grace 0-3, T Coyne 0-2, S O'Leary 0-1, A O'Regan 0-1.	Referee: F Murphy (Blackrock)

25 July 1981 Quarter-final	Midleton	2-14 - 4-05	Sarsfields	Páirc Uí Chonaill, Cobh
	K Hennessy 2-3, J Fenton 0-3, S O'Brien 0-2, T McCarthy 0-2, J Hartnett 0-2, S O'Farrell 0-1, D Mulcahy 0-1.		B Óg Murphy 1-3, B Cotter 1-1, P O'Riordan 1-0, R Fitzgerald 1-0.	Referee: M O'Flaherty (Blackrock)

Semi-finals

23 August 1981 Semi-final	Glen Rovers	5-09 - 3-11	Blackrock	Páirc Uí Chaoimh, Cork
	T Collins 2-2, T O'Neill 2-1, J Buckley 1-0, P Horgan 0-2, P Ring 0-2, D Coughlan 0-1, J Killeen 0-1.		É O'Donoghue 3-0, T Cashman 0-3, P Moylan 0-3, D Buckley 0-1, M Kilcoyne 0-1, É O'Sullivan 0-1, F Collins 0-1, R Cummins 0-1.	Referee: S O'Grady (Limerick)

29 August 1981 Semi-final	St. Finbarr's	3-11 - 2-12	Midleton	Riverstown
	J Barry-Murphy 1-2, T Finn 1-1, C Ryan 1-1, C McCarthy 0-4, J Meyler 0-2, J Cremin 0-1.		J Fenton 0-8, J Hartnett 1-1, G Glavin 1-1, T McCarthy 0-1, K Hennessy 0-1.

Final

13 September 1981 Final	St. Finbarr's	1-12 - 1-09	Glen Rovers	Páirc Uí Chaoimh, Cork
	C Ryan 1-1, J Meyler 0-3, J Cremin 0-2, É Fitzpatrick 0-1, J Barry-Murphy 0-1, C McCarthy 0-1, V Twomey 0-1, T Maher 0-1, B O'Brien 0-1.		P Ring 1-3, J Buckley 0-3, P Horgan 0-2, L Mulcahy 0-1.	Referee: F Murphy (Blackrock)

== Championship statistics ==
=== Top scorers ===
Top scorers overall

Rank	Player	Club	Tally	Total	Matches	Average
1	Christy Ryan	St. Finbarr's	6-05	23	4	5.75
2	Éamonn O'Donoghue	Blackrock	4-04	16	3	5.33
3	Pat Horgan	Glen Rovers	1-12	15	4	3.75
3	Paddy Ring	Glen Rovers	1-12	15	4	3.75
5	Ray Cummins	Blackrock	4-02	14	3	4.66
5	Charlie McCarthy	St. Finbarr's	1-11	14	4	3.50
5	Bertie Óg Murphy	Sarsfields	1-11	14	4	3.50
5	John Fenton	Midleton	0-14	14	3	4.66
9	Kevin Hennessy	Midleton	3-04	13	3	4.33
9	Tom O'Neill	Glen Rovers	3-04	13	4	3.25

=== Miscellaneous ===
- After two postponements due to inclement weather, the Midleton-Carrigdhoun second-round game was finally played on 21 June 1981. That game featured a 28-minute delay as a number of Carrigdhoun players were caught in heavy traffic in Cork.
- At a meeting on 30 June 1981, the Cork County Board ordered that the quarter-final between Glen Rovers and Youghal be replayed. Glen Rovers won the initial game, however, Youghal objected, alleging that one of the Glen players, Red Crowley, was under suspension on the date of the match. The board upheld the objection after an investigation.
- Charlie McCarthy became the first St. Finbarr's player to win six Cork SHC medals.
