= 1980 Cork Senior Football Championship =

Gaelic football competition

- Dates: 5 April – 14 September 1980
- Teams: 23
- Champions: St. Finbarr's (6th title); Christy Ryan (captain); Pat Lougheed (manager)
- Runners-up: University College Cork; Joe O'Driscoll (captain)

Tournament statistics
- Matches played: 44
- Goals scored: 127 (2.89 per match)
- Points scored: 763 (17.34 per match)
- Top scorer(s): Jamesie O'Connor (7-28)

The 1980 Cork Senior Football Championship was the 92nd staging of the Cork Senior Football Championship since its establishment by the Cork County Board in 1887. The championship began on 5 April 1980 and ended on 14 September 1980.

St. Finbarr's entered the championship as the defending champions.

On 14 September 1980, St. Finbarr's won the championship following a 3-08 to 1-09 defeat of University College Cork in the final. This was their sixth championship title overall and their second title in succession.

Jamesie O'Callaghan of the St. Finbarr's club was the championship's top scorer with 7-28.

== Team changes ==
=== To Championship ===
Promoted from the Cork Intermediate Football Championship

- Adrigole

== Results ==
=== Division 1 ===
==== Table ====
Pos	Team	Pld	W	D	L	SF	SA	Diff	Pts
1	Nemo Rangers	4	4	0	0	8-57	3-29	43	8
2	St. Finbarr's	4	3	0	1	9-41	4-36	20	6
3	St Michael's	4	2	0	2	4-41	10-40	-17	4
4	St. Nicholas'	4	1	0	3	9-23	7-43	-14	2
5	Bishopstown	4	0	0	4	2-26	8-40	-32	0
Green background The three top-placed teams qualified for the quarter-final stage of the championship proper.

==== Group stage results ====
5 April 1980	St. Nicholas'	2-04 - 0-06	Bishopstown	Mayfield
				Referee: E Porter (Brian Dillons)

10 May 1980	Nemo Rangers	3-12 - 1-09	Bishopstown	Ballinlough
	D Allen 2-5, J Kerrigan 1-2, E Fitzgerald 0-2, M Dorgan 0-2, T Dalton 0-1.		T O'Reilly 0-5, E Murphy 0-4, M Lyons 1-0.

19 June 1980	St. Finbarr's	3-10 - 0-05	Bishopstown	Ballinlough
	F O'Mahony 2-0, J O'Callaghan 1-3, J Allen 0-5, D Barry 0-1, R Kenny 0-1.		T O'Reilly 0-3, M Fleming 0-1, M Lyons 0-1.

25 June 1980	St Michael's	0-14 - 1-06	Bishopstown	Ballinlough
				Referee: J Kelly

5 July 1980	St Michael's	3-11 - 3-05	St. Nicholas	Páirc Uí Chaoimh, Cork
	B Field 0-6, T Deasy 1-1, D Buckley 1-1, C O'Leary 1-0, T Cashman 0-1, P Crowley 0-1, E O'Donoghue 0-1.		T O'Brien 2-1, J O'Neill 1-0, L Mulcahy 0-2, R Whitley 0-1, T O'Neill 0-1.

22 July 1980	St. Finbarr's	3-12 - 2-09	St. Nicholas'	Ballinlough
	J O'Callaghan 1-3, J Barry-Murphy 1-2, T Holland 1-2, D Barry 0-3, J Allen 0-2.		J O'Callaghan 2-1, J Buckley 0-3, JJ O'Neill 0-1, R Whitley 0-1, P Murray 0-1, M Murphy 0-1, L McCarthy 0-1.

22 July 1980	St Michael's	0-07 - 3-18	Nemo Rangers	Mayfield
	B Field 0-2, A Creagh 0-1, P Deasy 0-1, T Deasy 0-1, E O'Donoghue 0-1, P Moylan 0-1.		E Fitzgerald 2-1, T Dalton 1-2, D Allen 0-5, S Coughlan 0-4, S Hayes 0-2, J Kerrigan 0-2, D O'Driscoll 0-1, M Dorgan 0-1.

24 July 1980	Nemo Rangers	1-13 - 0-08	St. Finbarr's	Ballinlough
	D Allen 0-7, S Coughlan 1-1, S Hayes 0-2, J Kerrigan 0-2, T Dalton 0-1.		J O'Callaghan 0-4, T Holland 0-1, D Barry 0-1, R Kenny 0-1, J Allen 0-1.

26 July 1980	Nemo Rangers	1-14 - 2-05	St. Nicholas'	Ballinlough
	E Fitzgerald 1-5, C Murphy 0-3, D Allen 0-3, T Dalton 0-1, M Dorgan 0-1, S Hayes 0-1.		L Mulcahy 1-0, R Whitley 1-0, J Buckley 0-3, F O'Sullivan 0-1, JJ O'Neill 0-1.

26 July 1980	St. Finbarr's	3-11 - 1-09	St Michael's	Ballinlough
	J O'Callaghan 1-4, F O'Mahony 2-0, J Allen 0-2, D Barry 0-2, R Kenny 0-1, T Holland 0-1, J McCarthy 0-1.		P Deasy 1-1, B Field 0-4, C O'Leary 0-2, E O'Donoghue 0-2, D Buckley 0-1, P Crowley 0-1.

=== Division 2 ===
==== Table ====
Pos	Team	Pld	W	D	L	SF	SA	Diff	Pts
1	UCC	4	3	1	0	9-47	5-34	25	7
2	Castlehaven	4	3	0	1	5-47	5-36	11	6
3	Millstreet	4	2	1	1	5-36	6-35	-2	5
4	Glanworth	4	1	0	3	5-35	5-40	-5	2
5	Clonakilty	4	0	0	4	5-31	8-51	-29	0
Green background The three top-placed teams qualified for the quarter-final stage of the championship proper.

==== Group stage results ====
6 April 1980	Millstreet	2-11 - 1-10	Glanworth	Buttevant
	T Kenneally 2-6, T Kelleher 0-2, V Coakley 0-1, T Burke 0-1, L Buckley 0-1.		DJ Ryan 1-3, J O'Brien 0-3, J McCarthy 0-2, D Ahern 0-1, B Quinlan 0-1.

4 May 1980	Castlehaven	2-12 - 0-10	Glanworth	Ballinlough
	J Cleary 0-7, B Terry 1-1, M Burns 1-0, TJ O'Regan 0-1, D Collins 0-1, C Collins 0-1, A Collins 0-1.		D Courtney 0-7, T Downes 0-1, E Fleming 0-1, P O'Brien 0-1.

4 May 1980	University College Cork	3-18 - 2-09	Clonakilty	Innishannon

11 May 1980	Millstreet	1-08 - 1-08	University College Cork	Macroom
	D Crowley 1-0, T Kelleher 0-3, D Kenneally 0-2, P Flynn 0-1, J O'Mahony 0-1, L Buckley 0-1.		O Honeyman 1-1, L Goold 0-3, T O'Regan 0-2, M Kearney 0-1, M O'Neill 0-1.

25 May 1980	Millstreet	1-12 - 3-05	Clonakilty	Macroom
	D O'Driscoll 1-2, T Kenneally 0-4, T Kelleher 0-3, T Burke 0-2, P Flynn 0-1.		P Griffin 2-3, TF Hayes 1-1, P Googan 0-1.

1 June 1980	Castlehaven	2-11 - 0-10	Clonakilty	Clonakilty
	J Cleary 0-5, A Collins 1-1, D Nolan 1-0, B Terry 0-3, M O'Driscoll 0-1, TJ O'Regan 0-1.		P O'Regan 0-3, T Coogan 0-2, D Walsh 0-1, P Griffin 0-1, TF Hayes 0-1, M O'Donovan 0-1, J Crowley 0-1.

15 June 1980	Glanworth	2-10 - 0-07	Clonakilty	Páirc Uí Chaoimh, Cork
	B Quinlan 0-7, DJ Ryan 1-1, E Fleming 1-0, A Fahy 0-1, D Courtney 0-1.		J O'Donovan 0-3, P O'Regan 0-2, P Gogan 0-1, TF Hayes 0-1.

15 June 1980	Castlehaven	1-12 - 1-05	Millstreet	Ballingeary
	J Cleary 0-6, B Terry 0-5, D Minihane 1-1.		T Burke 1-0, B Sweeney 0-3, T Kelleher 0-2.

28 June 1980	University College Cork	4-11 - 0-12	Castlehaven	Clonakilty
	M Kilcoyne 2-1, T O'Regan 1-2, A Lotty 1-1, L Goold 0-3, E Walsh 0-2, B Lotty 0-1, H Moynihan 0-1.		J Cleary 0-7, B Terry 0-2, C Collins 0-2, F Collins 0-1.

5 July 1980	University College Cork	1-10 - 2-05	Glanworth	Watergrasshill
	L Goold 0-6, H Kelleher 1-0, M Kearney 0-1, M O'Neill 0-1, L Prendergast 0-1, T O'Regan 0-1.		T Downes 1-1, A Sheehan 1-0, DJ Ryan 0-2, P O'Brien 0-1, B Quinlan 0-1.

=== Division 3 ===
==== Table ====
Pos	Team	Pld	W	D	L	SF	SA	Diff	Pts
1	Naomh Abán	4	4	0	0	7-42	5-16	32	8
2	Bantry Blues	4	3	0	1	13-21	4-26	22	6
3	Dohenys	4	2	0	2	12-25	-24	4	
4	Na Piarsaigh	4	1	0	3	2-22	2-23	-1	2
5	Adrigole	4	0	0	4	5-13	7-27	-20	0
Green background The three top-placed teams qualified for the quarter-final stage of the championship proper.

==== Group stage results ====
6 April 1980	Bantry Blues	4-05 - 1-06	Adrigole	Kealkill
	K Evans 2-0, D Hunt 1-1, J Cotter 1-0, G Lynch 0-1, P McCarthy 0-1, V McCarthy 0-1, M McCarthy 0-1.		T Greene 1-0, B O'Neill 0-3, KJ O'Sullivan 0-1, S O'Shea 0-1, W O'Shea 0-1.

6 April 1980	Dohenys	0-07 - 1-08	Na Piarsaigh	Charlie Hurley Park, Bandon
	R Kelleher 0-3, Colman O'Rourke 0-1, D Collins 0-1, T Ross 0-1, S O'Sullivan 0-1.		J O'Sullivan 1-0, R McDonnell 0-3, P Barry 0-3, Jim O'Sullivan 0-1, G Murphy 0-1.

4 May 1980	Bantry Blues	2-08 - 1-06	Na Piarsaigh	Ballineen
	D Barron 1-2, P O'Driscoll 1-0, J Cotter 0-3, G Lynch 0-1, K Evans 0-1, D Hunt 0-1.		R Murphy 1-1, R McDonnell 0-2, C Coughlan 0-1, W O'Connell 0-1, P Barry 0-1.

11 May 1980	Dohenys	2-05 - 1-06	Adrigole	Aughaville

17 May 1980	Naomh Abán	4-06 - 1-04	Dohenys	Macroom
	G Healy 2-0, P Healy 0-5, D McCarthy 1-0, B Kelly 1-0, J Lynch 0-1.		I Kingston 1-0, D Herlihy 0-2, M Donovan 0-1, T Ross 0-1.

25 May 1980	Naomh Abán	0-08 - 1-03	Bantry Blues	Sam Maguire Park, Dunmanway

15 June 1980	Naomh Abán	1-17 - 3-01	Adrigole	Ballingeary
	D Healy 0-5, G Hoare 0-4, P Healy 0-4, G Lynch 1-0, L Forde 0-2, P Lynch 0-1, D McCarthy 0-1.		B O'Neill 1-1, SD O'Sullivan 1-0, T Greene 1-0.

15 June 1980	Bantry Blues	6-05 - 2-06	Dohenys	Rossa Park, Skibbereen
	D Barron 3-0, P O'Driscoll 2-0, J Cotter 1-2, D Hunt 0-1, P McCarthy 0-1, M McCarthy 0-1.		V O'Sullivan 1-0, L Kingston 1-0, D Herlihy 0-2, T Ross 0-2, B O'Rourke 0-1, D Collins 0-1.

21 June 1980	Naomh Abán	2-11 - 0-08	Na Piarsaigh	Coachford
	P Healy 0-6, D McCarthy 1-1, G Healy 1-0, D Healy 0-2, D Lucey 0-1, P Lynch 0-1.		P Barry 0-2, R McDonnell 0-2, D Murphy 0-2, J O'Sullivan 0-1, J O'Sullivan 0-1.

19 July 1980	Na Piarsaigh	w/o - scr.	Adrigole	Rossa Park, Skibbereen

=== Division 4 ===
13 April 1980 Round 1	Carrigdhoun	0-05 - 3-14	Avondhu	Riverstown

11 May 1980 Round 1	Imokilly	2-12 - 4-07	Duhallow	Castletownroche
	G Galvin 1-3, S O'Brien 0-4, R Swayne 1-0, J Fenton 0-3, B Ahern 0-1, B Óg Murphy 0-1.		N O'Connor 0-5, P O'Connor 1-1, A O'Mahony 1-1, N Kelleher 1-0, MJ Kearney 1-0.

25 May 1980 Round 1	Seandún	1-06 - 0-16	Muskerry	Macroom
	S Thornton 1-0, T McCarthy 0-3, M O'Regan 0-2.		M Moloney 0-3, S Murphy 0-3, D Walsh 0-2, N Dunne 0-2, C Kelly 0-2, D Creedon 0-1, T Creedon 0-1, M O'Leary 0-1, T O'Sullivan 0-1.

25 May 1980 Round 1	Carbery	5-08 - 0-07	Beara	Wolfe Tone Park, Bantry
	D Philpott 3-1, M Burns 1-2, S McCarthy 1-1, T Murphy 0-4.		C Collins 0-2, B Dwyer 0-1, S O'Sullivan 0-1, J Murphy 0-1, M O'Sullivan 0-1, P Murphy 0-1.

20 June 1980 Round 2	Avondhu	1-10 - 1-07	Carbery	Páirc Uí Chaoimh, Cork
	P Lonergan 1-0, G Mulcahy 0-3, F Groarke 0-2, T O'Callaghan 0-1, D O'Sullivan 0-1, D O'Hagan 0-1, M Dorney 0-1, M Mullins 0-1.		M Connolly 0-4, C O'Mahony 1-0, L O'Mahony 0-3.

13 July 1980 Round 2	Muskerry	1-08 - 1-07	Duhallow	Millstreet
	T Creedon 1-5, M Moloney 0-2, D Cronin 0-1.		N O'Connor 0-4, P O'Connor 1-0, B Daly 0-2, S Kelly 0-1.

17 August 1980 Round 3	Muskerry	1-11 - 1-09	Avondhu	Coachford
	M Healy 1-0, J Coakley 0-3, S Noonan 0-3, L Lucey 0-3, D Walsh 0-2.		D Relihan 1-2, J Buckley 0-4, D Coughlan 0-2, D Herlihy 0-1.

=== Quarter-finals ===
17 August 1980 Quarter-final	University College Cork	1-10 - 0-05	Bantry Blues	Clonakilty
	L Goold 0-5, B Lotty 1-0, C Kearney 0-3, T O'Regan 0-2.		J Cotter 0-2, P McCarthy 0-1, M McCarthy 0-1, K Evans 0-1.

17 August 1980 Quarter-final	St. Finbarr's	1-16 - 1-08	St Michael's	Páirc Uí Chaoimh, Cork
	J O'Callaghan 1-8, F O'Mahony 0-4, R Kenny 0-1, J Barry-Murphy 0-1, D Barry 0-1, D Philpott 0-1.		T Cashman 1-1, B Field 0-3, D Buckley 0-2, P Crowley 0-1, E O'Donoghue 0-1.

17 August 1980 Quarter-final	Nemo Rangers	2-06 - 0-10	Naomh Abán	Macroom
	C Murphy 1-1, S Coughlan 1-0, E Fitzgerald 0-2, D Allen 0-2, S Hayes 0-1.		D Healy 0-5, D McCarthy 0-2, L Forde 0-1, P Healy 0-1, G Healy 0-1.

31 August 1980 Quarter-final	Castlehaven	0-12 - 0-07	Muskerry	Sam Maguire Park, Dunmanway
	F Collins 0-4, J Cleary 0-3, A Collins 0-2, B Terry 0-2, D Minihane 0-1.		M O'Sullivan 0-2, S Murphy 0-1, D Creedon 0-1, D Cronin 0-1, T Creedon 0-1, M O'Leary 0-1.

=== Semi-finals ===
31 August 1980 Semi-final	St. Finbarr's	3-10 - 0-12	Nemo Rangers	Ballinlough
	J O'Callaghan 2-5, J Allen 1-1, J Barry-Murphy 0-3, T Holland 0-1.		E Fitzgerald 0-3, D Allen 0-3, S Coughlan 0-2, T Henneberry 0-2, J Kerrigan 0-1, C Murphy 0-1.

6 September 1980 Semi-final	University College Cork	1-10 - 0-09	Castlehaven	Charlie Hurley Park, Bandon
	L Gould 0-5, M Kilcoyne 1-0, T O'Regan 0-2, B Lotty 0-1, D Buckley 0-1, O Honeyman 0-1.		J Cleary 0-4, F Collins 0-3, B Terry 0-1, TJ O'Regan 0-1.

=== Final ===
14 September 1980 Final	St. Finbarr's	3-08 - 1-09	University College Cork	Páirc Uí Chaoimh, Cork
	T Holland 1-1, J O'Callaghan 1-1, J Barry-Murphy 1-1, F O'Mahony 0-4, J Allen 0-1.		L Gould 0-4, O Honeyman 1-0, C Kearney 0-2, E Walsh 0-1, D Buckley 0-1, H Moynihan 0-1.	Attendance: 4,500; Referee: J Dennigan (Fermoy)

== Championship statistics ==
=== Top scorers ===
Overall

Rank	Player	Club	Tally	Total	Matches	Average
1	Jamesie O'Callaghan	St. Finbarr's	7-28	49	7	7.00
2	John Cleary	Castlehaven	0-32	32	6	5.33
3	Dinny Allen	Nemo Rangers	2-25	31	6	6.16

=== Miscellaneous ===
- Adrigole withdrew midway through the championship after finding it difficult to field a team.
- The attendance at the final of 4,500 was the smallest since 1972.
- St. Finbarr's became the first single entity club to achieve the double.
