= 1982 Cork Senior Football Championship =

Gaelic football competition

- Dates: 24 April 1982 – 24 October 1982
- Teams: 23
- Champions: St. Finbarr's (7th title); Bertie O'Brien (captain); Pat Lougheed (manager)
- Runners-up: Duhallow; Pat O'Connor (captain)

Tournament statistics
- Matches played: 24
- Goals scored: 53 (2.21 per match)
- Points scored: 385 (16.04 per match)
- Top scorer(s): Eoin O'Mahony (2-22)

The 1982 Cork Senior Football Championship was the 94th staging of the Cork Senior Football Championship since its establishment by the Cork County Board in 1887. The draw for the opening round fixtures took place on 31 January 1982. The championship began on 24 April 1982 and ended on 24 October 1982.

Nemo Rangers entered the championship as the defending champions, however, they were beaten by Duhallow at the quarter-final stage.

On 24 October 1982, St. Finbarr's won the championship following a 3-08 to 1-09 defeat of University College Cork in the final. This was their 7th championship title overall and their first title since 1980.

Clonakilty's Eoin O'Mahony was the championship's top scorer with 2-22.

== Format change ==
The championship returned to a knock-out format after a one-year experiment of separating the city, rural and divisional teams.

== Results ==
=== First round ===
24 April 1982 First round	Kildorrey	1-07 - 0-09	Bishopstown	Castlelyons
	J O'Connor 1-1, A O'Connor 0-4, J McCarthy 0-1, T Monaghan 0-1.		R MacCárthaigh 0-2, F Collins 0-2, C Coffey 0-1, B Coffey 0-1, T Hayes 0-1, M McGrath 0-1, J Crowley 0-1.

24 April 1982 First round	Seandún	2-05 - 2-09	St Michael's	Páirc Uí Chaoimh, Cork
	T McCarthy 1-0, C O'Reilly 1-0, B Kenneally 0-3, M O'Regan 0-1, G Murphy 0-1.		D Buckley 1-4, E O'Donoghue 1-0, M Kilcoyne 0-2, C O'Leary 0-1, F Delaney 0-1, J Murphy 0-1.

2 May 1982 First round	Castlehaven	0-09 - 2-07	University College Cork	Clonakilty
	J Cleary 0-6, A Collins 0-1, B Terry 0-1, M Burns 0-1.		H Moynihan 1-2, B Lotty 1-1, M Buckley 0-1, M Crowley 0-1, M O'Sullivan 0-1, L O'Connell 0-1.

8 May 1982 First round	Ganworth	2-05 - 3-08	Duhallow	Buttevant
	A Fahy 1-1, T Downey 1-0, B Quinlan 0-1, D Ahern 0-1, J McCarthy 0-1, DJ Ryan 0-1.		N O'Connor 1-2, B O'Riordan 1-1, J Fitzgerald 1-1, O Kearney 0-2, P O'Connor 0-1, D Kelleher 0-1.

15 May 1982 First round	Avondhu	3-09 - 2-12	Carbery	Coachford
	Dave Relihan 1-4, Dan Relihan 1-3, J Hayes 1-0, J Keane 0-2.		P Crowley 1-5, N Crowley 0-4, T Crowley 1-0, F O'Regan 0-2, P Brennan 0-1.

16 May 1982 First round	Dohenys	0-10 - 1-12	Beara	Wolfe Tone Park, Bantry
	J Collins 0-3, C O'Rourke 0-2, B Herlihy 0-2, I Kingston 0-2, T Ross 0-1.		G Murphy 0-5, D Murphy 1-0, F McCarthy 0-2, S O'Shea 0-2, C Collins 0-1, O O'Sullivan 0-1, J Murphy 0-1.

7 June 1982 First round replay	Avondhu	0-11 - 0-08	Carbery	Coachford
	S O'Gorman 0-4, M Dorney 0-4, F Grourke 0-1, E Hickey 0-1, P O'Regan 0-1.		T Murphy 0-2, D Philpott 0-2, P Crowley 0-1, M Cahalane 0-1, S Crowley 0-1, J Ryan 0-1.

13 June 1982 First round	Bantry Blues	2-05 - 2-07	Nemo Rangers	Sam Maguire Park, Dunmanway
	D Barron 1-1, P O'Driscoll 0-4, D Hunt 1-0.		D Allen 0-4, J Kerrigan 1-0, M Niblock 1-0, S Hayes 0-3.

=== Second round ===
24 April 1982 Second round	Clonakilty	3-11 - 0-06	Na Piarsaigh	Ballinspittle
	E O'Mahony 1-6, P Moynihan 1-0, J O'Brien 1-0, M O'Donovan 0-3, R O'Donovan 0-1, J O'Donovan 0-1.		K Myers 0-3, C Coughlan 0-1, M Feehan 0-1, J O'Sullivan 0-1.

1 May 1982 Second round	St. Finbarr's	2-11 - 1-06	Muskerry	Ovens
	J O'Callaghan 1-3, F O'Mahony 1-2, T Leahy 0-2, J Allen 0-1, D Barry 0-1, D Brosnan 0-1, J Cremin 0-1.		V Coakley 1-1, S Murphy 0-2, B Lynch 0-1, M Moloney 0-1, D Cronin 0-1.

8 May 1982 Second round	Carrigdhoun	0-06 - 5-08	Imokilly	Church Road, Blackrock
	E Hanley 0-3, M Hennings 0-1, TJ Deasy 0-1, B Scanlon 0-1.		K Hennessy 2-0, K O'Connell 0-4, W Ahern 1-0, G Glavin 1-0, M Hennessy 1-0, T Murphy 0-3, R Swayne 0-1.

16 May 1982 Second round	University College Cork	1-10 - 0-10	Millstreet	Macroom
	H Moynihan 0-5, M Crowley 1-0, T Mannix 0-3, B Lotty 0-2.		N Crowley 0-8, B McSweeney 0-1, B Kelleher 0-1.

5 June 1982 Second round	Kildorrery	0-07 - 1-07	St. Nicholas'	Mallow
	A O'Connor 0-6, J Monaghan 0-1.		T O'Brien 1-0, L Mulcahy 0-3, G O'Callaghan 0-2, T Mulcahy 0-1, V Hedderman 0-1.

6 June 1982 Second round	St Michael's	1-09 - 2-07	Duhallow	Mallow
	T Lyons 1-1, D Buckley 0-4, F Delaney 0-2, T Cashman 0-1, M Kilcoyne 0-1.		J Fitzgerald 1-1, P O'Connor 1-1, N O'Connor 0-3, D Kelleher 0-1, D O'Connor 0-1.

11 July 1982 Second round	Beara	1-04 - 2-09	Avondhu	Sam Maguire Park, Dunmanway
	F McCarthy 1-0, P Murphy 0-2, C Collins 0-1, O O'Sullivan 0-1.		S O'Gorman 2-4, E Hickey 0-1, M Fitzgibbon 0-1, N Kirby 0-1, F O'Grourke 0-1, J O'Donoghue 0-1.

11 July 1982 Second round	Nemo Rangers	2-13 - 0-04	Naomh Abán	Cloughduv
	E Fitzgerald 1-5, M Dorgan 1-1, T Dalton 0-3, Colm Murphy 0-2, S Coughlan 0-1, D Allen 0-1.		D McCarthy 0-2, D Healy 0-1, P Healy 0-1.

=== Quarter-finals ===
10 July 1982 Quarter-final	Clonakilty	1-07 - 0-10	University College Cork	Charlie Hurley Park, Bandon
	E O'Mahony 0-6, M O'Donovan 1-0, D Collins 0-1.		H Moynihan 0-8, T Mannix 0-1, N Leonard 0-1.

23 July 1982 Quarter-final	Avondhu	1-10 - 1-08	St. Nicholas'	Clonmult Memorial Park, Midleton
	S O'Gorman 1-5, P Buckley 0-2, F Groarke 0-2, J O'Sullivan 0-1.		T Mulcahy 1-1, L Mulcahy 0-4, G Callaghan 0-1, R Whitley 0-1, J Buckley 0-1.

7 August 1988 Quarter-final	St. Finbarr's	1-09 - 1-07	Imokilly	Páirc Uí Chonaill, Cobh
	J O'Callaghan 0-4, D Barry 1-0, T Leahy 0-2, C Ryan 0-1, T O'Reilly 0-1, J Barry-Murphy 0-1.		G Glavin 0-4, R Swayne 1-0, A Power 0-1, B Óg Murphy 0-1, B Aherne 0-1.

8 August 1982 Quarter-final replay	Clonakilty	2-08 - 0-05	University College Cork	Charlie Hurley Park, Bandon
	E O'Mahony 1-4, D Walsh 1-1, F O'Regan 0-2, R O'Donovan 0-1.		H Moynihan 0-4, M Crowley 0-1.

15 August 1982 Quarter-final	Duhallow	1-06 - 0-08	Nemo Rangers	Macroom
	D Kelleher 1-1, N O'Connor 0-3, D O'Connor 0-1, G O'Sullivan 0-1.		D Allen 0-2, T Dalton 0-2, C Murphy 0-1, S Coughlan 0-1, T Hennebry 0-1, C Murphy 0-1.

=== Semi-finals ===
22 August 1982 Semi-final	Duhallow	0-10 - 0-06	Avondhu	Buttevant
	D Kelleher 0-4, N O'Connor 0-3, G O'Sullivan 0-3.		S O'Gorman 0-3, M Dorney 0-1, P Buckley 0-1, F O'Groarke 0-1.

12 September 1982 Semi-final	St. Finbarr's	1-12 - 0-08	Clonakilty	Charlie Hurley Park, Bandon
	J Barry-Murphy 1-1, J O'Callaghan 0-3, J Allen 0-2, D Barry 0-2, T O'Reilly 0-1, M Carey 0-1, F O'Mahony 0-1, D Brosnan 0-1.		E O'Mahony 0-6, J O'Brien 0-1, J O'Brien 0-1, F O'Regan 0-1.

=== Final ===
24 October 1982 Final	St. Finbarr's	1-05 - 0-05	Duhallow	Páirc Uí Chaoimh, Cork
	J Barry-Murphy 1-2, J O'Callaghan 0-1, D Barry 0-1, F O'Mahony 0-1.		G O'Sullivan 0-3, N O'Connor 0-1, D O'Mahony 0-1.	Attendance: 9,000; Referee: P O'Donovan (Bantry Blues)

== Championship statistics ==
=== Top scorer ===
Overall

Rank	Player	Club	Tally	Total	Matches	Average
1	Eoin O'Mahony	Clonakilty	2-22	28	4	7.00
2	Seán O'Gorman	Avondhu	3-16	25	4	6.25
3	Humphrey Moynihan	UCC	1-19	22	4	5.50
4	Niall O'Connor	Duhallow	1-12	15	5	3.00
5	Jamesie O'Callaghan	St. Finbarr's	1-11	14	4	3.50
6	Danny Buckley	St Michael's	1-08	11	2	5.50
7	Jimmy Barry-Murphy	St. Finbarr's	2-04	10	4	2.50
7	Donie Kelleher	Duhallow	1-07	10	5	2.00
7	Aidan O'Connor	Kildorrery	0-10	10	2	5.00
10	Pádraig Crowley	Carbery	1-06	9	2	4.50

In a single game

Rank	Player	Club	Tally	Total	Opposition
1	Seán O'Gorman	Avondhu	2-04	10	Beara
2	Eoin O'Mahony	Clonakilty	1-06	9	Na Piarsaigh
3	Pádraig Crowley	Carbery	1-05	8	Avondhu
3	Ephie Fitzgerald	Nemo Rangers	1-05	8	Naomh Abán
3	Seán O'Gorman	Avondhu	1-05	8	St. Nicholas'
3	Noel Crowley	Millstreet	0-08	8	UCC
3	Humphrey Moynihan	UCC	0-08	8	Clonakilty
8	Danny Buckley	St Michael's	1-04	7	Seandún
8	Dave Relihan	Avondhu	1-04	7	Carbery
8	Eoin O'Mahony	Clonakilty	1-04	7	UCC

=== Miscellaneous ===
- St. Finbarr's achieved the double for only the second time in their history.
