= 1980–81 All-Ireland Senior Club Football Championship =

Irish Football Championship

- Teams: 33
- Champions: St Finbarr's (2nd title); John Allen (captain); Pat Lougheed (manager)
- Runners-up: Walterstown

The 1980–81 All-Ireland Senior Club Football Championship was the 11th staging of the All-Ireland Senior Club Football Championship since its establishment by the Gaelic Athletic Association in 1970-71.

St Finbarr's were the defending champions.

On 31 May 1981, St Finbarr's won the championship following a 1-08 to 0-06 defeat of Walterstown in the All-Ireland final at Croke Park. It was their second championship title overall and their second title in succession.

== Munster ==
=== First round ===
9 November 1980 First round	Stradbally	0-09 - 0-09	Galtee Rovers	Páirc Uí Chuimín
	S Aherne 0-5, E O'Brien 0-2, M Coffey 0-1, J Keane 0-1.		S McCarthy 0-3, P Morrissey 0-2, D Hickey 0-2, M McCarthy 0-1, L Bergin 0-1.

9 November 1980 First round	St Finbarr's	4-04 - 1-05	Thomond College	Ballinlough Grounds
	J O'Callaghan 1-1, T Holland 1-1, J Barry-Murphy 1-0, F O'Mahony 1-0, D Barry 0-1, M Lynch 0-1.		P Burke 1-0, P McNamara 0-2, T Breen 0-1, R McCarrick 0-1, P Dillon 0-1.

7 December 1980 First round replay	Stradbally	4-09 - 1-13	Galtee Rovers	Páirc Uí Chuimín
	E O'Brien 2-5, T Aherne 1-1, M Coffey 1-0, S Aherne 0-3.		S McCarthy 0-7, M McCarthy 1-0, S Quinn 0-3, V O'Donnell 0-2, C Bergin 0-1.	Referee: J Dennigan (Cork)

=== Semi-finals ===
15 March 1981 Semi-final	Kilmihil	0-03 - 2-08	St Finbarr's	Páirc Uí Sheancháin
	M Garry 0-1, F Normoyle 0-1, C Collins 0-1.		J Allen 2-0, T Holland 0-4, F O'Mahony 0-3, R Kenny 0-1.

15 March 1981 Semi-final	Gneeveguilla	0-11 - 3-03	Stradbally	FitzGerald Stadium
	S O'Leary 0-4, J McCarthy 0-2, A O'Donovan 0-2, H Moynihan 0-2, M O'Donovan 0-1.		T Considine 2-0, J Keane 1-0, E O'Brien 0-1, R Dunfort 0-1, T Aherne 0-1.

=== Final ===
12 April 1981 Final	Stradbally	1-08 - 3-12	St Finbarr's	Páirc Uí Chuimín
	A Aherne 1-0, E O'Brien 0-3, C Barnes 0-2, A Curran 0-1, P Power 0-1, R Dunfort 0-1.		J Barry-Murphy 1-1, D Barry 1-1, F O'Mahony 1-1, J O'Callaghan 0-3, R Kenny 0-3, T Holland 0-2, J Cremin 0-1.

== Quarter-final ==
19 April 1981 Quarter-final	Scotstown	1-08 - 0-05	Tara	Páirc Ghabhán Uí Dhufaigh
	S McCarville 1-1, R McDermott 0-2, S McCrudden 0-1, C Morgan 0-1, B Beggan 0-1, N McKenna 0-1, B Morgan 0-1.		T Hannigan 0-3, F Keegan 0-2.

== Semi-finals ==
3 May 1981 Semi-final	Walterstown	2-12 - 1-05	St Mary's	Páirc Tailteann
	E Barry 1-10, G Cooney 1-0, N O'Sullivan 0-1, G McLoughlin 0-1.		R Henneberry 1-0, B Murphy 0-2, Jim Kent 0-2, M Laffey 0-1.

24 May 1981 Semi-final	St Finbarr's	0-08 - 0-04	Scotstown	Páirc Uí Chaoimh
	J O'Callaghan 0-2, J Barry-Murphy 0-2, J Allen 0-2, M Lynch 0-1, D Barry 0-1.		S McCarville 0-2, T Moyna 0-1, R McDermott 0-1.	Referee: J Gunning (Offaly)

== Final ==
31 May 1981 Final	St Finbarr's	1-08 - 0-06	Walterstown	Croke Park
	J Barry 1-0, J Barry-Murphy 0-2, D Barry 0-1, F O'Mahony 0-1, R Kenny 0-1, J O'Callaghan 0-1, M Lynch 0-1, C Ryan 0-1.		E Barry 0-2, F O'Sullivan 0-2, E O'Brien 0-1, O O'Brien 0-1.	Referee: Seamus Aldridge (Kildare)

== Statistics ==
=== Miscellaneous ===
- Walterstown won the Leinster Club Championship for the first time in their history.
- St Finbarr's became the first club to win All-Ireland titles in both codes. They stood alone with this until the conclusion of the 2024–25 competition, when Cuala won a senior football title to add to two previously won senior hurling titles.
