= 1986–87 All-Ireland Senior Club Football Championship =

Irish Football Championship

- Teams: 33
- Champions: St. Finbarr's (3rd title)
- Runners-up: Clann na nGael

The 1986–87 All-Ireland Senior Club Football Championship was the 17th staging of the All-Ireland Senior Club Football Championship since its establishment by the Gaelic Athletic Association in 1970-71.

Burren were the defending champions, however, they were beaten by Castleblayney Faughs in the Ulster Club Championship.

On 17 March 1987, St Finbarr's won the championship following a 0–10 to 0–07 defeat of Clann na nGael in the All-Ireland final at Croke Park. It was their third championship title overall and their first title since 1981.

== Munster ==
=== First round ===
12 October 1986 First round	Cooraclare	0-09 - 1-10	Austin Stacks	Páirc Chuar an Chláir
	C O'Donoghue 0-5, M lillis 0-1, O Downes 0-1, M Tubridy 0-1, N Murphy 0-1.		M Sheehy 1-5, E Moynihan 0-2, S O'Sullivan 0-2, G Power 0-1.

26 October 1986 First round	Claughaun	2-07 - 4-06	Clonmel Commercials	Gaelic Grounds
	D Fitzgerald 1-1, K Hanley 1-1, L O'Connor 0-2, M Galligan 0-2, P Galligan 0-1.		F Kelly 1-3, P Kilkenny 1-1, G McGrath 1-0, S Loughran 1-0, D O'Keeffe 0-1.

=== Semi-finals ===
9 November 1986 Semi-final	Clonmel Commercials	0-06 - 0-08	Kilrossanty	Clonmel Sportsground
	J McNamara 0-3, F Kelly 0-3.		J Maher 0-7, P White 0-1.

9 November 1986 Semi-final	Austin Stacks	0-05 - 0-11	St Finbarr's	Austin Stack Park
	M Sheehy 0-2, E Moynihan 0-1, G Power 0-1, K Barry 0-1.		D Barry 0-6, J Allen 0-1, M Barry 0-1, T Leahy 0-1, P Hayes 0-1, T Power 0-1.

=== Final ===
23 November 1986 Final	Kilrossanty	1-05 - 2-15	St Finbarr's	Fraher Field
	J Maher 1-3, T Keating 0-2.		D Barry 0-9, C Ryan 1-1, P Hayes 1-1, M Barry 0-3, J Allen 0-1.

== Quarter-final ==
1 February 1987 Quarter-final	Castleblayney Faughs	2-10 - 0-07	Kingdom Kerry Gaels	St Mary's Park

== Semi-finals ==
15 February 1987 Semi-final	Clann na nGael	0-13 - 1-05	Ferbane	Dr Hyde Park

15 February 1987 Semi-final	Castleblayney Faughs	1-12 - 2-09	St Finbarr's	St Mary's Park

1 March 1987 Semi-final replay	St Finbarr's	3-05 - 2-07	Castleblayney Faughs	Páirc Uí Chaoimh

== Final ==
17 March 1987 Final	St Finbarr's	0-10 - 0-07	Clann na nGael	Croke Park

== Statistics ==
=== Miscellaneous ===
- Clann na nGael became the first team to win three successive Connacht Club Championship titles.
- Ferbane won the Leinster Club Championship for the first time in their history.
- Castleblayney Faughs won the Ulster Club Championship for the first time in their history.
