= 1982 Cork Senior Hurling Championship =

Annual hurling competition season

- Dates: 1 May – 10 October 1982
- Teams: 19
- Champions: St. Finbarr's (22nd title); John Blake (captain); Con Roche (manager)
- Runners-up: Blackrock; Pat Moylan (captain); John Horgan (manager)

Tournament statistics
- Matches played: 21
- Goals scored: 80 (3.81 per match)
- Points scored: 460 (21.9 per match)
- Top scorer(s): John Fenton (2-24)

The 1982 Cork Senior Hurling Championship was the 94th staging of the Cork Senior Hurling Championship since its establishment by the Cork County Board in 1887. The draw for the opening round fixtures took place at the Cork Convention on 31 January 1982. The championship began on 1 May 1982 and ended on 10 October 1982.

St. Finbarr's entered the championship as the defending champions.

The final was played on 10 October 1982 at Páirc Uí Chaoimh in Cork, between St. Finbarr's and Blackrock, in what was their first meeting in the final in three years. St. Finbarr's won the match by 2–17 to 3–09 to claim their 22nd championship title overall and a third successive title.

Midleton's John Fenton was the championship's top scorer with 2-24.

== Team changes ==
Promoted from the Cork Intermediate Hurling Championship

- Newtownshandrum

== Results ==
=== First round ===
1 May 1982 First round	Avondhu	4-15 - 2-07	Seandún	Páirc Uí Chaoimh, Cork
	D Relihan 2-5, M Fitzgibbon 1-2, T Butler 1-0, P Shanahan 0-3, J Keane 0-2, P Greely 0-1, J Madigan 0-1, J Dillon 0-1.		C Coffey 1-1, K Keane 1-0, J Nodwell 0-2, E Murphy 0-1, P O'Sullivan 0-1, J Crowley 0-1, McCarthy 0-1.	Referee: M Keane (Cloughduv)

2 May 1982 First round	Éire Óg	0-06 - 0-08	Carrigdhoun	Charlie Hurley Park, Bandon
	D O'Flynn 0-2, L O'Leary 0-2, J Lucey 0-1, J O'Leary 0-1.		B Coleman 0-4, J O'Donovan 0-1, P O'Leary 0-1, K O'Donovan 0-1, W Ashman 0-1.	Referee: N Hallihan (Bandon)

2 May 1982 First round	Imokilly	1-03 - 4-08	Duhallow	Kildorrery
	A Power 1-1, D Mellerick 0-2.		B O'Connor 1-2, M Biggane 1-1, P Field 1-1, T O'Riordan 1-0, J Noonan 0-2, O Kearney 0-1, J Kenneally 0-1.	Referee: P Sheehan (Mallow)

=== Second round ===
15 May 1982 Second round	Na Piarsaigh	1-11 - 3-11	Youghal	Castlemartyr
	Jim O'Sullivan 1-1, T O'Sullivan 0-4, John O'Sullivan 0-2, M O'Sullivan 0-1, W O'Connell 0-1, J Gardiner 0-1, R McDonnell 0-1.		T Coyne 2-7, R Swayne 1-4.	Referee: W Horgan (Brian Dillons)

15 May 1982 Second round	St. Finbarr's	2-13 - 2-11	Sarsfields	Caherlag
	T Finn 2-1, J Cremin 0-5, J Barry-Murphy 0-3, J Meyler 0-2, C Ryan 0-1, E Fitzpatrick 0-1.		G McEvoy 1-4, P Ryan 1-1, B Óg Murphy 0-5, D Prendergast 0-1.	Referee: F Murphy (Blackrock)

15 May 1982 Second round	Avondhu	3-09 - 2-12	Carbery	Coachford
	Dave Relihan 1-4, Dan Relihan 1-3, J Hayes 1-0, J Keane 0-2.		P Crowley 1-5, N Crowley 0-4, T Crowley 1-0, F O'Regan 0-2, P Brennan 0-1.	Referee: M Keane (Cloughduv)

16 May 1982 Second round	Midleton	2-12 - 1-08	Duhallow	Castletownroche
	J Fenton 0-7, S O'Brien 1-1, J O'Keeffe 1-0, J Hartnett 0-3, G Glavin 0-1.		N Brosnan 0-4, B O'Connor 1-0, P Field 0-1, D Scanlon 0-1, J Noonan 0-1, M Biggane 0-1.	Referee: P Sheehan (Mallow)

16 May 1982 Second round	Glen Rovers	2-14 - 1-07	Carrigdhoun	Liam MacCarthy Park, B'garvan
	P Horgan 1-3, L McAuliffe 1-2, J Mulcahy 0-4, T Collins 0-3, C Hayes 0-1, JJ O'Neill 0-1.		J O'Halloran 1-0, B Coleman 0-3, D McCarthy 0-1, B Scanlon 0-1, P O'Leary 0-1, J Reynolds 0-1.	Referee: D Horgan

22 May 1982 Second round	Ballyhea	1-12 - 0-13	Newtownshandrum	Mannix Park, Charleville
	W Shanahan 0-7, D O'Flynn 1-3, D O'Sullivan 0-1, M Morrissey 0-1.		D Coughlan 0-8, J Buckley 0-3, J Herlihy 0-1, D Morrissey 0-1.

2 June 1982 Second round	Muskerry	2-09 - 0-12	Nemo Rangers	Ballinhassig
	P McDonnell 2-2, C Kelly 0-6, M Ring 0-1.		T Nation 0-5, D Murphy 0-3, N Maxwell 0-2, C Murphy 0-1, J Barry 0-1.	Referee: N Hallihan (Bandon)

13 June 1982 Second round replay	Avondhu	5-13 - 2-09	Carbery	Coachford
	M Fitzgibbon 1-5, J Hayes 2-0, S O'Gorman 1-2, Dan Relihan 1-0, Dave Relihan 0-2, J Keane 0-1, D Roche 0-1, P Greely 0-1, D Murphy 0-1.		P Crowley 1-3, T Crowley 1-2, A Desmond 0-3, N Crowley 0-1.	Referee: M Keane (Cloughduv)

Second round	Blackrock	w/o - scr.	University College Cork

=== Quarter-finals ===
26 June 1982 Quarter-final	St. Finbarr's	3-12 - 0-12	Youghal	Clonmult Memorial Park, Midleton
	J Barry-Murphy 2-2, J Cremin 0-6, V Twomey 1-1, T Finn 0-2, J Meyler 0-1.		T Coyne 0-4, M Walsh 0-3, R Swayne 0-2, P Grace 0-3.	Referee: F Murphy (Blackrock)

27 June 1982 Quarter-final	Midleton	3-10 - 2-13	Muskerry	Páirc Uí Chaoimh, Cork
	J Fenton 1-5, K Hennessy 1-2, J O'Keeffe 1-0, G Glavin 0-2, G O'Farrell 0-1.		Pat McDonnell 1-1, C Kelly 0-4, L Barry 0-3, D Walsh 0-2, T Dunne 0-1, C O'Mahony 0-1, Peadar McDonnell 0-1.	Referee: W Horgan (Brian Dillons)

27 June 1982 Quarter-final	Blackrock	7-13 - 3-10	Avondhu	Castlelyons
	D Buckley 3-3, R Cummins 3-1, M Kilcoyne 1-1, T Deasy 0-4, P Moylan 0-3, P Kavanagh 0-1.		G Hayes 2-0, D Relihan 1-2, D Murphy 0-2, G Madigan 0-2.	Referee: M Keane (Cloughduv)

3 July 1982 Quarter-final	Glen Rovers	3-11 - 1-10	Ballyhea	Moore Park, Kilworth
	T Mulcahy 2-2, T O'Brien 1-0, R Whitley 0-3, P Horgan 0-3, L McAuliffe 0-1, R Crowley 0-1, T O'Neill 0-1.		W Shanahan 1-6, D Ryan 0-2, D O'Flynn 0-2.	Referee: F Murphy (Blackrock)

15 August 1982 Quarter-final replay	Midleton	2-13 - 1-05	Muskerry	Páirc Uí Chaoimh, Cork
	K Hennessy 2-1, D Boylan 0-3, J Fenton 0-2, G Glavin 0-2, S O'Brien 0-2, S Farrell 0-1, S Mahony 0-1, J Farrell 0-1.		C Kelly 1-0, D Walsh 0-3, P McDonnell 0-1, J Gardiner 0-1.	Referee: W Horgan (Brian Dillons)

=== Semi-finals ===
21 August 1982 Semi-final	St. Finbarr's	1-14 - 2-11	Midleton	Páirc Uí Chaoimh, Cork
	J Cremin 0-5, C Ryan 1-1, T Maher 0-4, J Barry-Murphy 0-2, É Fitzpatrick 0-1, J Meyler 0-1.		J Fenton 0-6, J Boylan 1-0, G Glavin 1-0, P Hartnett 0-2, K Hennessy 0-1, D Boylan 0-1, S O'Brien 0-1.	Referee: F Murphy (Blackrock)

22 August 1982 Semi-final	Blackrock	2-14 - 1-17	Glen Rovers	Páirc Uí Chaoimh, Cork
	É O'Donoghue 2-1, T Cashman 0-5, D Buckley 0-4, R Cummins 0-1, P Moylan 0-1, T Deasy 0-1, P Deasy 0-1.		P Horgan 0-7, T O'Brien 1-0, R WHitley 0-3, T Collins 0-2, J Buckley 0-2, JJ O'Neill 0-1, J O'Brien 0-1, T Mulcahy 0-1.	Referee: S O'Grady (Limerick)

26 September 1982 Semi-final replay	Blackrock	1-16 - 2-08	Glen Rovers	Páirc Uí Chaoimh, Cork
	D Buckley 0-7, R Cummins 1-1, É O'Donoghue 0-3, T Deasy 0-2, M Kilcoyne 0-1, E O'Sullivan 0-1, T Cashman 0-1.		K O'Keeffe 1-3, T O'Neill 1-0, P Ring 0-2, J Killeens 0-1, T Collins 0-1, J Buckley 0-1.	Referee: S O'Grady (Limerick)

26 September 1982 Semi-final replay	St. Finbarr's	0-14 - 1-08	Midleton	Páirc Uí Chaoimh, Cork
	J Cremin 0-7, C Ryan 0-4, J Barry-Murphy 0-2, T Maher 0-1.		J Fenton 1-4, S O'Brien 0-1, D Boylan 0-1, J Hartnett 0-1, T McCarthy 0-1.	Referee: F Murphy (Blackrock)

=== Final ===
10 October 1982 Final	St. Finbarr's	2-17 - 3-09	Blackrock	Páirc Uí Chaoimh, Cork
	J Barry-Murphy 1-3, T Finn 0-4, J Cremin 0-4, V Twomey 1-0, J Meyler 0-2, T Maher 0-2, C Ryan 0-2.		R Cummins 3-0, F Collins 0-3, P Moylan 0-2, D Buckley 0-2, É O'Donoghue 0-1, T Cashman 0-1.	Referee: J O'Grady (Limerick)

== Championship statistics ==
=== Top scorers ===
Top scorer overall

Rank	Player	Club	Tally	Total	Matches	Average
1	John Fenton	Midleton	2-24	30	5	6.00
2	John Cremin	St. Finbarr's	0-27	27	5	5.40
3	Ray Cummins	Blackrock	7-03	25	4	6.00
3	Dan Relihan	Avondhu	5-10	25	4	6.25
3	Danny Buckley	Blackrock	3-16	25	4	6.25
6	Jimmy Barry-Murphy	St. Finbarr's	3-12	21	5	4.20
7	Tony Coyne	Youghal	2-11	17	2	8.50
8	Willie Shanahan	Ballyhea	1-13	16	2	8.00
8	Pat Horgan	Glen Rovers	1-13	16	4	4.00
10	Pádraig Crowley	Carbery	2-08	14	2	7.00

Top scorers in a single game

Rank	Player	Club	Tally	Total	Opposition
1	Tony Coyne	Youghal	2-07	13	Na Piarsaigh
2	Danny Buckley	Blackrock	3-03	12	Avondhu
3	Dan Relihan	Avondhu	2-05	11	Seandún
4	Ray Cummins	Blackrock	3-01	10	Avondhu
5	Ray Cummins	Blackrock	3-00	9	St. Finbarr's
5	Willie Shanahan	Ballyhea	1-06	9	Glen Rovers
7	Pat McDonnell	Muskerry	2-02	8	Nemo Rangers
7	Jimmy Barry-Murphy	St. Finbarr's	2-02	8	Youghal
7	Tomás Mulcahy	Glen Rovers	2-02	8	Ballyhea
7	John Fenton	Midleton	1-05	8	Muskerry
7	Pádraig Crowley	Carbery	1-05	8	Avondhu
7	Mick Fitzgibbon	Avondhu	1-05	8	Carbery
7	Donal Coughlan	Newtownshandrum	0-08	8	Ballyhea
