= 1985 Cork Senior Football Championship =

Gaelic football competition

- Dates: 13 April 1985 – 15 September 1985
- Teams: 21
- Champions: St. Finbarr's (8th title); John Meyler (captain); Gussie Harrington (manager)
- Runners-up: Clonakilty; Eoin O'Mahony (captain)

Tournament statistics
- Matches played: 22
- Top scorer(s): Dave Barry (1-27)

The 1985 Cork Senior Football Championship was the 97th staging of the Cork Senior Football Championship since its establishment by the Cork County Board in 1887. The draw for the opening round fixtures took place on 27 January 1985. The championship began on 13 April 1985 and ended on 15 September 1985.

Imokilly entered the championship as the defending champions, however, they were defeated by Avondhu in the first game of the championship.

On 15 September 1985, St. Finbarr's won the championship following a 1–10 to 0–09 defeat of Clonakilty in the final. This was their 8th championship title overall and their first title since 1982.

Dave Barry from the St. Finbarr's club was the championship's top scorer with 1-27.

== Team changes ==
=== To Championship ===
Promoted from the Cork Intermediate Football Championship

- Midleton

== Results ==
=== First round ===
13 April 1985 First round	Imokilly	0-05 - 1-08	Avondhu	Rathcormac
	T McCarthy 0-2, B Aherne 0-2, B Lotty 0-1.		P Harrington 0-4, T Fitzgibbon 1-0, M Beston 0-2, W O'Riordan 0-1, P Nelligan 0-1.	Referee: E Porter (Brian Dillons)

19 April 1985 First round	Seandún	0-05 - 2-12	Nemo Rangers	Páirc Uí Chaoimh, Cork
	D McSweeney 0-2, N Hannigan 0-2, E Forde 0-1.		M Dorgan 1-3, C Murphy 1-1, S Hayes 0-2, D Allen 0-2, T Coakley 0-2, T Nation 0-1, E Fitzgerald 0-1.	Referee: D Collins (Kinsale)

20 April 1985 First round	Passage	0-05 - 1-07	Na Piarsaigh	Mayfield
	J O'Neill 0-1, C O'Reilly 0-1, M Shaw 0-1, P Maxwell 0-1, K O'Reilly 0-1.		T O'Sullivan 1-4, C Coughlan 0-1, R McDonnell 0-1, J O'Sullivan 0-1.	Referee: P Cronin (St. Finbarr's)

5 May 1985 First round	Millstreet	0-11 - 1-07	Bantry Blues	Ballingeary
	N Crowley 0-4, J O'Leary 0-4, J Coleman 0-2, D Crowley 0-1.		M Crowley 1-1, P O'Driscoll 0-3, J Cotter 0-2, P O'Callaghan 0-1.	Referee: A Twomey (Ballincollig)

12 May 1985 First round	Clonakilty	2-07 - 1-04	Beara	Wolfe Tone Park, Bantry
	J O'Donovan 1-1, E Scally 1-0, T Scally 0-2, E O'Mahony 0-2, M de Long 0-1, C O'Donovan 0-1.		R O'Dwyer 1-0, G Murphy 0-3, C Collins 0-1.	Referee: P O'Donovan (Bantry Blues)

20 May 1985 First round	St. Nicholas'	0-10 - 1-13	St. Finbarr's	Páirc Uí Chaoimh, Cork
	D O'Donovan 0-3, J McCarthy 0-2, T Mulcahy 0-2, C Hartnett 0-1, V Hedderman 0-1, T Corbett 0-1.		D Barry 0-6, P Hayes 1-1, K McCarthy 0-2, J Allen 0-1, M Slocum 0-1, J Barry-Murphy 0-1, R Kenny 0-1.	Referee: D O'Connor (Bishopstown)

=== Second round ===
20 April 1985 Second round	Castlehaven	1-13 - 2-06	Midleton	Charlie Hurley Park, Bandon
	J Cleary 0-7, C Collins 1-0, M Connolly 0-3, A Collins 0-2, M Burns 0-1.		G Glavin 1-2, G Power 1-1, E Cleary 0-1, J Boylan 0-1, S O'Brien 0-1.	Referee: N Hallahan (Bandon)

20 April 1985 Second round	Duhallow	1-08 - 1-06	Carbery	Cloughduv
	N O'Connor 0-5, P O'Connor 1-1, D Kelleher 0-1, J Dennehy 0-1.		T Murphy 1-2, M McCarthy 0-2, E Murphy 0-1, T Davis 0-1.

11 May 1985 Second round	St. Finbarr's	2-08 - 0-10	University College Cork	Páirc Uí Chaoimh, Cork
	K McCarthy 1-1, F O'Mahony 1-1, D Barry 0-3, T Leahy 0-2, J Allen 0-1.		E Moynihan 0-3, K Walsh 0-2, T McSweeney 0-2, D O'Donovan 0-1, M O'Sullivan 0-1, S Liston 0-1.	Referee: D O'Connor

12 May 1985 Second round	Nemo Rangers	1-11 - 0-10	Macroom	Coachford
	E Fitzgerald 0-6, M Dorgan 1-2, S Coughlan 0-1, T Nation 0-1, T Dalton 0-1.		M Riordan 0-3, L Gould 0-3, F Corrigan 0-2, C Corrigan 0-1, D Crowley 0-1.	Referee: R Murphy (Lyre)

25 May 1985 Second round	Millstreet	1-03 - 1-09	Avondhu	Kanturk
	J Coleman 1-0, A Barry 0-1, C O'Connor 0-1, D O'Driscoll 0-1.		T Fitzgibbon 1-2, P Harrington 0-2, P Nelligan 0-2, M Beston 0-1, M O'Riordan 0-1, B Stack 0-1.	Referee: E Porter (Brian Dillons)

26 May 1985 Second round	Clonakilty	1-09 - 0-11	Muskerry	Charlie Hurley Park, Bandon
	E O'Mahony 0-5, M de Long 1-1, T Scally 0-1, J O'Donovan 0-1, E Scally 0-1.		D McCarthy 0-6, V Coakley 0-2, D Creedon 0-1, K Creed 0-1, S Murphy 0-1.	Referee: D Collins (Kinsale)

2 June 1985 Second round	Na Piarsaigh	0-15 - 1-06	Carrigdhoun	Minane Bridge
	R McDonnell 0-6, T O'Sullivan 0-4, C Coughlan 0-2, T Guest 0-1, John O'Sullivan 0-1, D O'Reilly 0-1.		S Timmons 1-0, K Sheehan 0-2, TJ Deasy 0-1, J O'Donovan 0-1, R Gillanders 0-1, O Carroll 0-1.	Referee: N Hallahan (Bandon)

=== Quarter-finals ===
8 June 1985 Quarter-final	Duhallow	3-08 - 1-08	Na Piarsaigh	O'Connell Park, Glantane
	N O'Connor 1-3, J Fitzgerald 1-1, T Healy 1-0, D Kelleher 0-2, D O'Connor 0-1, P O'Connor 0-1.		T O'Sullivan 0-6, C Coughlan 1-0, R McDonnell 0-1, J O'Meara 0-1.	Referee: D Casey (Ballyclough)

8 June 1985 Quarter-final	St. Finbarr's	2-09 - 1-12	Castlehaven	Clonakilty
	M Slocum 0-4, R Kenny 1-0, J Allen 1-0, J Barry-Murphy 0-2, D Barry 0-2, K McCarthy 0-1.		N Cahalane 1-2, J Cleary 0-4, A Collins 0-2, M Burns 0-1, C Collins 0-1, TJ O'Regan 0-1, F Collins 0-1.	Referee: F Murphy

15 June 1985 Quarter-final	Nemo Rangers	0-11 - 2-06	Clonakilty	Charlie Hurley Park, Bandon
	E Fitzgerald 0-8, Colm Murphy 0-1, D Allen 0-1, Charlie Murphy 0-1.		E Scally 1-1, E O'Mahony 1-0, T Scally 0-2, M de Long 0-2, J O'Donovan 0-1.	Referee: J Dennigan (Fermoy)

15 June 1985 Quarter-final	Avondhu	1-02 - 0-05	Bishopstown	Rathcormac
	W O'Riordan 1-0, P Harrington 0-2.		P McGrath 0-3, O Moran 0-1, M McGrath 0-1,	Referee: E Porter (Brian Dillons)

27 July 1985 Quarter-final replay	Avondhu	0-07 - 1-09	Bishopstown	Rathcormac
	P Harrington 0-2, W O'Riordan 0-2, J Landy 0-2, D O'Sullivan 0-1.		P McGrath 0-7, P Moran 1-0, M Dorney 0-1, G McCarthy 0-1.	Referee: E Porter (Brian Dillons)

27 July 1985 Quarter-final replay	St. Finbarr's	2-10 - 1-07	Castlehaven	Clonakilty
	J Barry-Murphy 2-0, D Barry 0-5, M Slocum 0-2, T Leahy 0-1, B Searles 0-1, D O'Mahony 0-1.		J Cleary 1-2, M Connolly 0-2, M Burns 0-2, A Collins 0-1.

=== Semi-finals ===
18 August 1985 Semi-final	Clonakilty	2-04 - 0-03	Bishopstown	Charlie Hurley Park, Bandon
	E O'Mahony 1-2, R O'Donovan 1-1, T Scally 0-1.		A O'Sullivan 0-1, E Lyons 0-1, G McCarthy 0-1.	Referee: F Murphy

8 September 1985 Semi-final	St. Finbarr's	3-09 - 0-13	Duhallow	Coachford
	D Barry 1-6, T Leahy 1-1, J Barry-Murphy 1-0, D Slocum 0-1, P Hayes 0-1.		N O'Connor 0-6, D Kelleher 0-3, D O'Mahony 0-2, P O'Connor 0-1, D Culloty 0-1.	Referee: F Murphy

=== Final ===
15 September 1985 Final	St. Finbarr's	1-10 - 0-09	Clonakilty	Páirc Uí Chaoimh, Cork
	D Barry 0-5, J Barry-Murphy 1-1, C Ryan 0-2, M Slocum 0-1, B Searles 0-1.		E O'Mahony 0-7, M de Long 0-1.	Referee: F Murphy

== Championship statistics ==
=== Top scorers ===
Top scorers overall

Rank	Player	Club	Tally	Total	Matches	Average
1	Dave Barry	St. Finbarr's	1-27	30	6	5.00
2	Eoin O'Mahony	Clonakilty	2-16	22	5	4.40
3	Tony O'Sullivan	Na Piarsaigh	1-14	17	3	5.66
3	Niall O'Connor	Duhallow	1-14	17	3	5.66
5	Jimmy Barry-Murphy	St. Finbarr's	4-04	16	6	2.75
5	John Cleary	Castlehaven	1-13	16	3	5.33
7	Ephie Fitzgerald	Nemo Rangers	0-15	15	3	5.00
8	Michael Dorgan	Nemo Rangers	2-05	11	6	1.83
9	Paul McGrath	Bishopstown	0-10	10	3	3.33
9	Paddy Harrington	Avondhu	0-10	10	4	2.50

Top scorers in a single game

Rank	Player	Club	Tally	Total	Opposition
1	Dave Barry	St. Finbarr's	1-06	9	Duhallow
2	Ephie Fitzgerald	Nemo Rangers	0-08	8	Clonakilty
3	Tony O'Sullivan	Na Piarsaigh	1-04	7	Passage
3	John Cleary	Castlehaven	0-07	7	Midleton
3	Paul McGrath	Bishopstown	0-07	7	Avondhu
3	Eoin O'Mahony	Clonakilty	0-07	7	St. Finbarr's
7	Jimmy Barry-Murphy	St. Finbarr's	2-00	6	Castlehaven
7	Michael Dorgan	Nemo Rangers	1-03	6	Seandún
7	Niall O'Connor	Duhallow	1-03	6	Na Piarsaigh
7	Dave Barry	St. Finbarr's	0-06	6	St. Nicholas'
7	Ephie Fitzgerald	Nemo Rangers	0-06	6	Macroom
7	Dermot McCarthy	Muskerry	0-06	6	Clonakilty
7	Richie McDonnell	Na Piarsaigh	0-06	6	Carrigdhoun
7	Tony O'Sullivan	Na Piarsaigh	0-06	6	Duhallow
7	Niall O'Connor	Duhallow	0-06	6	St. Finbarr's
