= 1980 Cork Senior Hurling Championship =

Annual hurling competition season

- Dates: 6 April – 12 October 1980
- Teams: 17
- Champions: St. Finbarr's (20th title); Billy O'Brien (captain); Gerald McCarthy (manager)
- Runners-up: Glen Rovers; Denis Coughlan (captain); Denis Coughlan (manager)

Tournament statistics
- Matches played: 36
- Goals scored: 146 (4.06 per match)
- Points scored: 730 (20.28 per match)
- Top scorer(s): John Fenton

The 1980 Cork Senior Hurling Championship was the 92nd staging of the Cork Senior Hurling Championship since its establishment by the Cork County Board in 1887. The championship began on 6 April 1980 and ended on 12 October 1980.

Blackrock entered the championship as the defending champions in search of a third successive title, however, they were beaten by Glen Rovers in the semi-finals.

The final was played on 12 October 1980 at Páirc Uí Chaoimh in Cork, between St. Finbarr's and Glen Rovers, in what was their first meeting in the final in three years. St. Finbarr's won the match by 1–09 to 2–04 to claim their 20th championship title overall and their first title in three years.

Midleton's John Fenton was the championship's top scorer.

== Team changes ==
=== To Championship ===
Promoted from the Cork Intermediate Hurling Championship

- Éire Óg

== Division 1 ==
=== Division 1 results ===
13 April 1980	Glen Rovers	1-12 - 1-07	Midleton	Páirc Uí Chaoimh

26 April 1980	Glen Rovers	4-10 - 1-08	Youghal	Castlemartyr
	P Ring 3-2, K McGann 1-1, P Horgan 0-2, K O'Keeffe 0-2, T O'Neill 0-1, JJ O'Neill 0-1, S Green 0-1.		T Coyne 1-3, M Coyne 0-2, A O'Regan 0-1, S O'Leary 0-1, G Bullman 0-1.	Referee: M O'Flaherty (Blackrock)

31 May 1980	Blackrock	2-10 - 1-10	Glen Rovers	Páirc Uí Chaoimh
	T Lyons 1-1, T Deasy 1-1, D Collins 0-4, D Mac Curtain 0-1, É O'Donoghue 0-1, R Cummins 0-1, P Moylan 0-1.		P Ring 0-8, T O'Neill 1-0, K O'Keeffe 0-1, P Horgan 0-1.	Referee: D O'Connor (Bishopstown)

1 June 1980	St. Finbarr's	1-11 - 0-10	Midleton	Páirc Uí Chaoimh
	C McCarthy 0-5, J Barry-Murphy 1-1, C Ryan 0-2, J Allen 0-2, J Cremin 0-1.		J Fenton 0-8, K Hennessy 0-1, S O'Farrell 0-1.	Referee: M Beecher (Ballyhooley)

7 June 1980	Blackrock	9-15 - 2-06	Youghal	Páirc Uí Chaoimh
	É O'Donoghue 7-3, R Cummins 0-5, E O'Sullivan 1-1, T Lyons 1-1, T Cashman 0-2, T Deasy 0-2, P O'Neill 0-1.		M Butler 1-1, S O'Leary 1-0, R O'Sullivan 0-2, M Coyne 0-2, T Coyne 0-1.	Referee: T Linehan (Inniscara)

29 June 1980	Midleton	1-13 - 1-08	Youghal	Páirc Liam Uí Riain
	J Fenton 0-9, K Hennessy 1-1, G Glavin 0-1, T McCarthy 0-1, J Hartnett 0-1.		R O'Sullivan 1-2, P Grace 0-2, T Coyne 0-1, S O'Leary 0-1, M Coyne 0-1, C Cooney 0-1.	Referee: J Motherway (Aghada)

5 July 1980	Blackrock	3-15 - 3-07	Midleton	Páirc Uí Chonaill
	É O'Donoghue 2-1, É O'Sullivan 1-2, P Moylan 0-5, T Deasy 0-3, J O'Grady 0-2, D Collins 0-1, D Buckley 0-1.		J Fenton 0-6, G Glavin 1-0, S O'Farrell 1-0, K Hennessy 1-0.	Referee: M Beecher (Ballyhooley)

2 August 1980	Youghal	0-09 - 4-11	St. Finbarr's	Clonmult Memorial Park
	M Coyne 0-3, T Coyne 0-3, S O'Leary 0-2, P Grace 0-1.		C McCarthy 1-5, G Murphy 1-2, J Barry-Murphy 1-1, T Maher 1-1, J Allen 0-1, C Ryan 0-1.	Referee: J Motherway (Aghada)

10 August 1980	Blackrock	2-10 - 0-12	St. Finbarr's	Ballinlough
	P Moylan 1-4, E O'Sullivan 1-3, É O'Donoghue 0-1, T Cashman 0-1, T Deasy 0-1.		J Allen 0-4, J O'Shea 0-2, J Barry-Murphy 0-2, C McCarthy 0-1, J Hodgins 0-1, J Meyler 0-1, B O'Brien 0-1.

13 August 1980	Glen Rovers	2-08 - 1-11	St. Finbarr's	Ballinlough

== Division 2 ==
=== Division 2 results ===
6 April 1980	Sarsfields	2-10 - 0-15	Nemo Rangers	Páirc Séamus de Barra
				Referee: J Motherway (Aghada)

13 April 1980	Éire Óg	9-03 - 5-13	Na Piarsaigh	Inniscarra
	M Malone 2-1, V Twomey 2-0, D O'Flynn 2-0, J O'Leary 2-0, M O'Flynn 1-0, M Kelleher 0-2.		M O'Sullivan 2-0, M McCarthy 2-0, John O'Sullivan 0-6, P Barry 0-5, R McDonnell 1-1, Jim O'Sullivan 0-1.	Referee: M English (Bishopstown)

13 April 1980	Bandon	2-11 - 0-10	University College Cork	Ballinhassig
	G O'Mahony 2-1, P Crowley 0-7, J Fitzgerald 0-1, G O'Sullivan 0-1, PJ O'Mahony 0-1.		M Walsh 0-4, L Murphy 0-3, J Greally 0-2, B O'Farrell 0-1.	Referee: W Horgan (Brian Dillons)

27 April 1980	Na Piarsaigh	3-17 - 1-11	University College Cork	Páirc Uí Chaoimh
	W O'Callaghan 2-2, D Murphy 1-5, P Barry 0-3, R McDonnell 0-2, John O'Sullivan 0-2, Jim O'Sullivan 0-2, M O'Sullivan 0-1.		P O'Leary 1-0, K Curtin 0-2, B Farrell 0-2, J Greally 0-2, K White 0-2, P Boylan 0-1.	Referee: W Horgan (Brian Dillons)

3 May 1980	Éire Óg	2-15 - 1-08	University College Cork	Ballinhassig
	V Twomey 1-3, D Desmond 0-6, D Flynn 1-2, N Malone 0-1, C Malone 0-1, D Flynn 0-1, M Flynn 0-1.		M Walsh 1-3, J Greally 0-2, K Whyte 0-1, B Dineen 0-1, J Minogue 0-1.	Referee: J McEvoy

8 May 1980	Sarsfields	5-16 - 1-10	University College Cork	Páirc Uí Chaoimh
	B Óg Murphy 2-5, E Kelleher 1-3, P Riordan 1-2, S Farrell 0-5, B Cotter 1-0, R Fitzgerald 0-1.

24 May 1980	Nemo Rangers	3-06 - 0-10	Na Piarsaigh	Ballinlough
	D Calnan 1-2, N Morgan 1-0, W Barry 1-0, J Barrett 0-2, D O'Sullivan 0-1, D Barry 0-1.		J Whooley 0-3, M McCarthy 0-2, C Coughlan 0-1, R McDonald 0-1, J O'Sullivan 0-1, D Murphy 0-1, M O'Sullivan 0-1.	Referee: J Kelly (Patrick Hanleys)

1 June 1980	Nemo Rangers	3-09 - 1-07	Bandon	Kinsale
	N Morgan 2-2, D Calnan 0-4, K Murphy 1-0, J Barrett 0-1, D Allen 0-1, D Murphy 0-1.		P Crowley 1-2, J Fitzgerald 0-2, J Gabriel 0-1, P McCarthy 0-1, J Murphy 0-1.	Referee: M Keane (Cloughduv)

6 June 1980	Sarsfields	1-13 - 3-07	Na Piarsaigh	Páirc Uí Chaoimh
	B Óg Murphy 0-4, P O'Riordan 1-0, S Farrell 0-2, B Cotter 0-2, E Kelleher 0-1, P Ryan 0-1, R Fitzgerald 0-1, B Lotty 0-1, G McEvoy 0-1.		W O'Connell 2-0, P Barry 1-2, R McDonnell 0-2, J Whooley 0-1, J O'Sullivan 0-1, D Murphy 0-1.	Referee: W Horgan (Brian Dillons)

15 June 1980	Éire Óg	1-10 - 1-05	Bandon	Cloughduv
	M Kelleher 1-2, M Malone 0-2, D Flynn 0-2, J O'Leary 0-1, V Twomey 0-1, L Flynn 0-1, M Flynn 0-1.		P Crowley 1-2, P McCarthy 0-2, F Crowley 0-1.

29 June 1980	Bandon	1-12 - 1-08	Na Piarsaigh	Liam MacCarthy Park
	F Crowley 1-3, P Crowley 0-4, P McCarthy 0-2, A Duggan 0-2, N Crowley 0-1.		P Barry 1-2, Jim O'Sullivan 0-2, M O'Sullivan 0-2, D Murphy 0-1.	Referee: J Forbes (Crosshaven)

4 July 1980	Sarsfields	3-06 - 3-06	Éire Óg	Church Road
	E Kelleher 1-3, P Ryan 1-1, P O'Riordan 1-0, B Óg Murphy 0-1, S Farrell 0-1.		J O'Leary 1-4, M Flynn 1-0, A O'Connor 1-0, M Kelleher 0-1, D O'Flynn 0-1.	Referee: M O'Flaherty (Blackrock)

13 July 1980	Sarsfields	2-14 - 2-12	Bandon	Ballinhassig
	E Ryan 0-6, G McEvoy 1-1, D Crowley 1-1, P Ryan 0-3, P O'Riordan 0-1, B Lotty 0-1, S O'Farrell 0-1.		F Crowley 1-1, J Fitzgerald 1-1, P Crowley 0-3, N Crowley 0-3, P McCarthy 0-2, D Duggan 0-1, J Gabriel 0-1.	Referee: M English (Bishopstown)

3 August 1980	Éire Óg	3-08 - 1-09	Nemo Rangers	Ballinhassig
	J O'Leary 1-2, D Flynn 1-2, M Flynn 1-0, M Kelleher 0-2, D Flynn 0-1, L Flynn 0-1.		N Morgan 1-1, S Coughlan 0-2, S Hayes 0-2, D Calnan 0-2, D Allen 0-1, W Barry 0-1.	Referee: M Flaherty (Blackrock)

== Division 3 ==
=== Division 3 first round ===
20 May 1980 First round	Carbery	3-08 - 3-09	Seandún	Ballinlough
	D Noonan 2-5, D Dwyer 1-1, T Crowley 0-1, F O'Leary 0-1.		E Murphy 1-1, J Nodwell 1-1, D Keane 1-0, B Meade 0-3, T Howard 0-1, K Keane 0-1, J Atkins 0-1, M Lyons 0-1.	Referee: A Twomey (Ballincollig)

25 May 1980 First round	Imokilly	1-04 - 2-15	Avondhu	Castlelyons
	R O'Connor 1-1, K O'Shea 0-2, M Lynch 0-1.		W Shanahan 0-7, P Corbett 1-2, G Madigan 1-0, J Buckley 0-3, D Flynn 0-2, C Brassill 0-1.	Referee: W Horgan (Brian Dillons)

=== Division 3 semi-finals ===
17 May 1980 Semi-final	Carrigdhoun	1-06 - 3-09	Muskerry	Kilbrittain
	K O'Donovan 1-0, B Coleman 0-3, D Dunne 0-1, J Dineen 0-1, J O'Donovan 0-1.		C Kelly 1-8, M Healy 1-0, D O'Brien 1-0, P O'Connell 0-1.	Referee: D Hurley (Shamrocks)

5 July 1980 Semi-final	Seandún	2-07 - 2-15	Avondhu	Páirc Mac Gearailt
	J McCarthy 0-6, E Murphy 1-0, D Keane 1-0, P O'Sullivan 0-1.		D Ryan 1-3, D Coughlan 1-1, D Relihan 0-3, W Shanahan 0-2, D Herlihy 0-1, J Hayes 0-1, P Ryan 0-1, P Corbett 0-1, P Noonan 0-1, G Madigan 0-1.	Referee: J Motherway (Aghada)

=== Division 3 final ===
15 August 1980 Final	Muskerry	1-11 - 1-09	Avondhu	Coachford
	J Lucey 0-4, M Healy 1-0, J Coakley 0-3, S Noonan 0-3, D Walsh 0-1.		Dan Relihan 1-2, J Buckley 0-3, D Coughlan 0-2, D Herlihy 0-1, Dave Relihan 0-1.	Referee: J O'Riordan

== Knock-out stage ==
=== Quarter-finals ===
24 August 1980 Quarter-final	St. Finbarr's	2-10 - 1-11	Éire Óg	Liam MacCarthy Park
	J Barry-Murphy 2-0, J Cremin 0-5, T Maher 0-3, C McCarthy 0-2.		V Twomey 0-5, M Flynn 1-1, D Flynn 0-2, J O'Leary 0-1, M Kelleher 0-1, M Malone 0-1.	Referee: J O'Riordan (Bandon)

24 August 1980 Quarter-final	Glen Rovers	1-15 - 0-09	Nemo Rangers	Ballinlough
	T Collins 1-1, J Buckley 0-3, P Ring 0-3, K O'Keeffe 0-3, L Mulcahy 0-2, D Coughlan 0-1, P Horgan 0-1, JJ O'Neill 0-1.		W Barry 0-2, S Coughlan 0-2, D Calnan 0-2, S Buckley 0-1, N Morgan 0-1, D Murphy 0-1.	Referee: M O'Flaherty (Blackrock)

24 August 1980 Quarter-final	Blackrock	4-16 - 3-09	Sarsfields	Páirc Uí Chonaill
	P Moylan 2-9, É O'Donoghue 1-1, T Lyons 1-0, T Deasy 0-3, T Cashman 0-2, É O'Sullivan 0-1.		E Kelleher 1-3, B Óg Murphy 0-5, P O'Riordan 1-0, B Cotter 1-0, S O'Farrell 0-1.	Referee: J Motherway (Aghada)

7 September 1980 Quarter-final	Midleton	3-13 - 3-09	Muskerry	Bishops Casey Memorial Park
	J Fenton 1-8, K Hennessy 1-1, G Glavin 1-0, S O'Brien 0-2, D Barry 0-1, S O'Farrell 0-1.		C Kelly 3-5, M Healy 0-1, S Noonan 0-1, J Lucey 0-1, T Coakley 0-1.	Referee: P Sheehan (Mallow)

=== Semi-finals ===
28 September 1980 Semi-final	St. Finbarr's	5-10 - 2-14	Midleton	Páirc Uí Chaoimh
	J Barry-Murphy 1-5, C McCarthy 2-0, C Ryan 1-2, M Kennedy 1-0, J Cremin 0-2, J O'Shea 0-1.		J Fenton 0-9, G Glavin 0-4, D Hurley 1-0, S O'Brien 1-0, K Hennessy 0-1.	Referee: F Murphy (Blackrock)

28 September 1980 Semi-final	Glen Rovers	1-12 - 0-12	Blackrock	Páirc Uí Chaoimh
	P Horgan 0-4, P Ring 0-4, T Collins 1-0, JJ O'Neill 0-1, K McGann 0-1, J Buckley 0-1, J O'Brien 0-1.		P Moylan 0-4, E O'Sullivan 0-2, D Buckley 0-2, T Cashman 0-1, J Horgan 0-1, F Cummins 0-1, T Deasy 0-1.	Referee: J O'Riordan

=== Final ===
12 October 1980 Final	St. Finbarr's	1-09 - 2-04	Glen Rovers	Páirc Uí Chaoimh
	É Fitzpatrick 1-1, J Barry-Murphy 0-3, C McCarthy 0-3, J Cremin 0-2.		J Buckley 1-0, T Collins 1-0, P Horgan 0-2, JJ O'Neill 0-1, L Mulcahy 0-1.	Attendance: 15,331; Referee: F Murphy (Blackrock)

== Championship statistics ==
=== Miscellaneous ===
- St. Finbarr's became the first single entity club to achieve the double.
