= 1979 Cork Senior Football Championship =

Gaelic football competition

- Dates: 11 April 1979 – 21 October 1979
- Teams: 22
- Champions: St. Finbarr's (5th title); Noel Ahern (captain); Pat Lougheed (manager)
- Runners-up: Castlehaven; Tim O'Regan (captain); Ned Cleary (manager)

Tournament statistics
- Matches played: 41
- Goals scored: 104 (2.54 per match)
- Points scored: 693 (16.9 per match)
- Top scorer(s): T. J. O'Regan (2-23)

The 1979 Cork Senior Football Championship was the 91st staging of the Cork Senior Football Championship since its establishment by the Cork County Board in 1887. The championship began on 11 April 1979 and ended on 21 October 1979.

Nemo Rangers entered the championship as the defending champions, however, they were defeated by Castlehaven at the semi-final stage.

On 21 October 1979, St. Finbarr's won the championship following a 3-14 to 2-07 defeat of Castlehaven in the final. This was their fifth championship title overall and their first title since 1976.

Castlehaven's T. J. O'Regan was the championship's top scorer with 2-23.

== Team changes ==
=== To Championship ===
Promoted from the Cork Intermediate Football Championship

- Castlehaven

== Results ==
=== Division 1 ===
11 April 1979	St. Nicholas'	0-08 - 3-15	Nemo Rangers	Ballinlough
	P Burke 0-3, R Whitley 0-2, T O'Neill 0-2, L Mulcahy 0-1.		T Dalton 1-6, J Barrett 1-1, K Collins 0-4, D Murphy 1-0, D Allen 0-2, D O'Driscoll 0-1, J Kerrigan 0-1.

19 April 1979	St. Nicholas'	4-06 - 1-08	St Michael's	Páirc Uí Chaoimh, Cork
	T O'Neill 2-1, R Whitley 1-2, L Mulcahy 1-0, T O'Brien 0-2, J O'Neill 0-1.		R Cummins 1-2, P Crowley 0-3, D Buckley 0-2, B Field 0-1.

29 April 1970	Nemo Rangers	0-14 - 0-06	St Michael's	Páirc Uí Chaoimh, Cork
	T Dalton 0-4, K Collins 0-3, J Barrett 0-3, S Hayes 0-2, N Morgan 0-1, D Linehan 0-1.		D Buckley 0-3, P Crowley 0-1, B Field 0-1, R Cummins 0-1.

29 April 1979	St. Finbarr's	1-08 - 1-03	Clonakilty	Charlie Hurley Park, Bandon
	J McCarthy 1-1, J O'Callaghan 0-3, C Myers 0-2, J Allen 0-1, W O'Donnell 0-1.		P Griffin 1-0, D McCarthy 0-2, O O'Mahony 0-1.

5 May 1979	St Michael's	0-11 - 1-06	St. Finbarr's	Ballinlough
	D Buckley 0-6, T Lyons 0-2, A Creagh 0-1, B Field 0-1, E O'Donoghue 0-1.		F O'Mahony 1-1, J o'Callaghan 0-2, J Allen 0-1, J McCarthy 0-1, W O'Driscoll 0-1.

16 June 1979	Nemo Rangers	2-07 - 1-09	St. Finbarr's	Church Road, Blackrock
	K Collins 1-2, J Barrett 1-0, D Allen 0-3, S Hayes 0-1, T Dalton 0-1.		J O'Callaghan 1-1, R Kenny 0-2, J McCarthy 0-2, J Cremin 0-1, J Allen 0-1, F Twomey 0-1, C Ryan 0-1.

16 June 1979	St. Nicholas'	5-07 - 3-09	Clonakilty	Charlie Hurley Park, Bandon
	R Whitley 2-2, L Mulcahy 2-0, T O'Neill 1-1, D O'Donovan 0-2, JJ O'Neill 0-1, P Burke 0-1.		E O'Mahony 2-6, P Gavin 1-0, D McCarthy 0-1, P Griffin 0-1, P O'Neill 0-1.

29 July 1979	Nemo Rangers	3-12 - 1-06	Clonakilty	Charlie Hurley Park, Bandon
	J Barrett 0-7, T Dalton 1-0, S Hayes 1-0, D Linehan 1-0, M Dorgan 0-3, J Hennebry 0-1.		E O'Mahony 0-4, M O'Donovan 1-0, P O'Neill 0-1, P Griffin 0-1.

12 August 1979	St Michael's	0-13 - 0-05	Clonakilty	Cloughduv
	D Buckley 0-6, D Shaughnessy 0-2, T Murphy 0-2, P Moylan 0-1, A Creagh 0-1, P Ward 0-1.		P Griffin 0-4, J Power 0-1.

12 August 1979	St. Finbarr's	2-16 - 2-04	St. Nicholas'	Páirc Uí Chaoimh, Cork
	J Barry-Murphy 1-2, F O'Mahony 1-1, R Kenny 0-4, J Allen 0-3, F Twomey 0-2, J McCarthy 0-2, J Cremin 0-1, D Philpott 0-1.		T O'Neill 1-1, P O'Doherty 1-0, G O'Callaghan 0-2, D O'Donovan 0-1.

28 August 1979 Play-off	St Michael's	0-10 - 1-04	St. Nicholas'	Páirc Uí Chaoimh, Cork
	D Buckley 0-4, P Ward 0-2, P Kavanagh 0-2, C O'Leary 0-1, E O'Donoghue 0-1.		T O'Neill 1-2, R Whitley 0-1, J Buckley 0-1.

=== Division 2 ===
15 April 1979	Millstreet	0-11 - 0-08	Naomh Abán	Castle Grounds, Macroom
	T Kenneally 0-5, V Coakley 0-2, B McSweeney 0-2, D Crowley 0-1, N Crowley 0-1.		D Healy 0-3, D McCarthy 0-3, J Healy 0-1, P Lynch 0-1.

19 April 1979	University College Cork	1-09 - 0-09	Bishopstown	Ballinlough
	S Walsh 1-0, A Lotty 0-3, D Buckley 0-2, L Gould 0-2, H Moynihan 0-1, C Kearney 0-1.		D Collins 0-3, E Murphy 0-3, M Fleming 0-1, T O'Reilly 0-1, J Crowley 0-1.

6 May 1979	Bishopstown	5-10 - 2-05	Naomh Abán	Coachford
	R Murphy 3-1, D Collins 1-1, J Crowley 1-1, E O'Connor 0-2, T O'Reilly 0-2, K Ronan 0-1, B Murphy 0-1, D O'Connor 0-1.		C Twomey 1-0, J Lynch 1-0, D Healy 0-2, J Lucey 0-1, G Healy 0-1, J Hoare 0-1.

6 May 1979	University College Cork	2-06 - 0-09	Millstreet	Coachford
	C Kearney 1-0, H Moynihan 1-0, A Lotty 0-3, L Gould 0-3.		T Kenneally 0-5, D O'Hare 0-2, M O'Riordan 0-1, P Flynn 0-1.

16 June 1979	Bishopstown	1-12 - 1-11	Millstreet	Coachford
	M Fleming 1-1, E Murphy 0-3, J Crowley 0-3, T O'Reilly 0-2, N Murphy 0-1, D Collins 0-1, G Herlihy 0-1.		D O'Hare 1-2, J Coleman 0-3, T Kelleher 0-2, P Flynn 0-1, P Kenneally 0-1, B Sweeney 0-1, M Reardon 0-1.

1 July 1979	Naomh Abán	1-09 - 1-06	University College Cork	Ballyvourney
	J Hoare 1-1, J Lynch 0-2, C Twomey 0-1, G Healy 0-1, D Healy 0-1, S Mullane 0-1, F McSweeney 0-1, L Forde 0-1.		R Bunyan 1-3, M O'Leary 0-1, A Lotty 0-1, D Buckley 0-1.

=== Division 3 ===
15 April 1979	Glanworth	2-06 - 1-08	Na Piarsaigh	Watergrasshill
				Referee: F Halbert (Watergrasshill)

15 April 1979	Dohenys	0-07 - 1-07	Castlehaven	Wolfe Tone Park, Bantry
	C O'Rourke 0-4, D O'Herlihy 0-2, M Cagney 0-1.		TJ O'Regan 0-4, F Collins 1-0, B Terry 0-1, D Collins 0-1, J O'Mahony 0-1.

6 May 1979	Dohenys	1-10 - 1-09	Bantry Blues	Rossa Park, Skibbereen
	C O'Rourke 0-4, V O'Sullivan 1-0, R Kelleher 0-3, J Collins 0-1, B Herlihy 0-1, B O'Rourke 0-1.		P McCarthy 0-5, T Delaney 1-1, G Lynch 0-1, M Kelly 0-1, F Carroll 0-1.

6 May 1979	Castlehaven	2-14 - 2-04	Glanworth	Innishannon
	TJ O'Regan 1-3, F Collins 1-2, B Collins 0-5, B Terry 0-2, A Collins 0-1, M Byrne 0-1.		J O'Brien 1-1, A Fahy 1-1, J Courtney 0-2.

26 May 1979	Na Piarsaigh	1-09 - 1-09	Dohenys	Charlie Hurley Park, Bandon
	R McDonnell 1-1, John O'Sullivan 0-2, D Murphy 0-2, F Buckley 0-2, B Kelleher 0-1, Jerome O'Sullivan 0-1.		C O'Rourke 0-5, D Crowley 1-1, B O'Rourke 0-1, R Kelleher 0-1, V O'Sullivan 0-1.

27 May 1979	Castlehaven	1-11 - 1-07	Bantry Blues	Sam Maguire Park, Dunmanway
	TJ Regan 0-5, D Minihane 1-0, F Collins 0-3, B Terry 0-2, B Collins 0-1.		A Delaney 1-1, D Barron 0-4, V McCarthy 0-1, M Kelly 0-1.

16 June 1979	Na Piarsaigh	2-12 - 2-05	Bantry Blues	Castle Grounds, Macroom
	D Murphy 1-3, B Kelleher 1-1, John O'Sullivan 0-4, Jerome O'Sullivan 0-2, Jim O'Sullivan 0-1, R McDonnell 0-1.		M Kelly 2-2, A Delaney 0-1, M Clifford 0-1, P McCarthy 0-1.

17 June 1979	Glanworth	2-09 - 0-14	Dohenys	Ballinhassig
	DJ Ryan 1-3, D Courtney 1-2, J Courtney 0-2, P O'Brien 0-1, J McCarthy 0-1.		C O'Rourke 0-7, J Carroll 0-4, D O'Herlihy 0-2, R Kelleher 0-1.

1 July 1979	Na Piarsaigh	1-10 - 2-04	Castlehaven	Clonakilty
	John O'Sullivan 1-4, R McDonnell 0-3, D Murphy 0-2, J Buckley 0-1.		B Collins 2-1, C Collins 0-1, TJ O'Regan 0-1, F Collins 0-1.

1 July 1979	Glanworth	3-04 - 1-09	Bantry Blues	Innishannon
	DJ Ryan 1-1, C Aherne 1-1, J O'Neill 1-0, D Courtney 0-1, A Fahy 0-1.		G Lynch 1-1, P McCarthy 0-4, A Delaney 0-2, V McCarthy 0-1, M Clifford 0-1.

4 August 1979 Play-off	Castlehaven	3-09 - 3-04	Glanworth	Innishannon
	D Minihane 2-1, J Cleary 1-1, D Collins 0-2, TJ O'Regan 0-2, C Collins 0-1, A Collins 0-1, J Nolan 0-1.		DJ Ryan 1-2, D Courtney 1-0, J Courtney 1-0, J Curtin 0-1, J McCarthy 0-1.

=== Division 4 ===
20 May 1979 Round 1	Duhallow	2-10 - 1-09	Muskerry	Ballyvourney
	N O'Connor 1-1, G O'Sullivan 1-1, P O'Connor 0-3, J O'Keeffe 0-2, J O'Leary 0-2, A O'Mahony 0-1.		S Murphy 1-4, P Lucey 0-2, T O'Sullivan 0-1, D Walsh 01-, M Sullivan 0-1.	Referee: D Casey (Ballyclough)

20 May 1979 Round 1	Imokilly	1-11 - 0-06	Carrigdhoun	Church Road, Blackrock
	T Murphy 1-3, W Ahern 0-3, T Hegarty 0-3, E Ryan 0-1, J Fleming 0-1.		G Hanley 0-4, E Hanley 0-2.

20 May 1979 Round 1	Avondhu	2-10 - 1-08	Seandún	Castlelyons
	P Lonergan 1-2, M Mullins 1-1, T O'Callaghan 0-2, N Kirby 0-2, T Molan 0-1, M Monaghan 0-1, F O'Grourke 0-1.		P O'Regan 1-4, B Murphy 0-2, P Holland 0-1, J Horgan 0-1.

9 June 1979 Round 2	Duhallow	1-08 - 1-10	Avondhu	Banteer
	J Cronin 1-0, P O'Connor 0-3, N O'Connor 0-3, A O'Mahony 0-1, J O'Keeffe 0-1.		A Monaghan 1-1, M Mullins 0-2, J O'Connor 0-2, P Lonergan 0-2, N Kirby 0-2, G Madigan 0-1.

17 June 1979 Round 1	Beara	2-04 - 0-10	Carbery	Beara Park, Castletownbere
	T O'Sullivan 1-1, B O'Dwyer 1-1, O O'Sullivan 0-1, B O'Neill 0-1.		T Murphy 0-4, T Holland 0-2, R Wilmot 0-2, M Burns 0-1, D Houlihan 0-1.

1 July 1979 Round 1 replay	Beara	1-09 - 1-08	Carbery	Beara Park, Castletownbere
	B O'Dwyer 1-4, S O'Shea 0-2, F McCarthy 0-1, JJ O'Sullivan 0-1, O O'Sullivan 0-1.		T Holland 1-5, R Wilmot 0-1, N McNamara 0-1, S McCarthy 0-1.	Referee: A Twomey (Ballincollig)

5 August 1979 Round 2	Beara	1-08 - 2-06	Imokilly	Sam Maguire Park, Dunmanway
	B O'Dwyer 0-7, S O'Shea 1-0, D O'Sullivan 0-1.		E Ryan 0-5, D Kearney 1-1, S O'Brien 1-0.

=== Quarter-finals ===
1 September 1970 Quarter-final	Avondhu	2-07 - 1-05	Bishopstown	Watergrasshill
	P Lonergan 1-2, G Mulcahy 1-2, D O'Hagan 0-2, N Kirby 0-1.		E Murphy 1-0, M Fleming 0-1, J Crowley 0-1, E O'Connor 0-1, D Murphy 0-1, T O'Reilly 0-1.

1 September 1979 Quarter-final	St. Finbarr's	0-07 - 0-04	St Michael's	Páirc Uí Chaoimh, Cork
	J Allen 0-2, C Ryan 0-1, J Barry-Murphy 0-1, F O'Mahony 0-1, G McCarthy 0-1, M Lynch 0-1.		P Kavanagh 0-2, D Buckley 0-2.

1 September 1979 Quarter-final	Castlehaven	0-10 - 0-09	University College Cork	Charlie Hurley Park, Bandon
	F Collins 0-4, TJ O'Regan 0-3, A Collins 0-2, B Terry 0-1.		D Buckley 0-3, A Lotty 0-2, H Moynihan 0-1, R Bunyan 0-1, C Kearney 0-1, J Nodwell 0-1.

=== Semi-finals ===
15 September 1979 Semi-final	Castlehaven	1-07 - 0-09	Nemo Rangers	Clonakilty
	TJ O'Regan 1-2, D Minihane 0-2, A Collins 0-2, J Cleary 0-1.		D Allen 0-3, M Dorgan 0-2, K Collins 0-2, D Murphy 0-1, J Kerrigan 0-1.

16 September 1979 Semi-final	St. Finbarr's	0-14 - 1-08	Avondhu	Clonmult Memorial Park, Midleton
	G McCarthy 0-7, C Ryan 0-3, J Allen 0-2, F O'Mahony 0-2.		G Mulcahy 1-3, D O'Hagan 0-2, T Monaghan 0-2, P Lonergan 0-1.

=== Final ===
21 October 1979 Final	St. Finbarr's	3-14 - 2-07	Castlehaven	Páirc Uí Chaoimh, Cork
	J Allen 1-2, G McCarthy 0-5, J Barry-Murphy 1-1, M Lynch 1-1, F Twomey 0-2, C Ryan 0-1, F Mahony 0-1, R Kenny 0-1.		F Collins 1-0, D Minihane 1-0, TJ O'Regan 0-3, B Terry 0-3, D Collins 0-1.	Attendance: 20,000; Referee: J Dennigan (Fermoy)

== Championship statistics ==
=== Top scorers ===
Overall

Rank	Player	Club	Tally	Total	Matches	Average
1	T. J. O'Regan	Castlehaven	2-23	29	8	3.62
2	Danny Buckley	St Michael's	0-23	23	6	3.83
3	Tom O'Neill	St. Nicholas'	5-07	22	5	4.40
3	Gerry McCarthy	St. Finbarr's	1-19	22	7	3.14
5	Colman O'Rourke	Dohenys	0-20	20	4	5.00
6	Francis Collins	Castlehaven	3-10	19	7	2.71
7	Bobbie O'Dwyer	Beara	2-12	18	3	6.00
8	Eoin O'Mahony	Clonakilty	2-11	17	3	5.66
8	Timmy Dalton	Nemo Rangers	2-11	17	5	3.40
8	Jimmy Barrett	Nemo Rangers	2-11	17	5	3.40

=== Miscellaneous ===
- Castlehaven make their first appearance at senior level.
- Castlehaven qualified for the final for the first time in their history.
