= Mick Kenefick =

Irish hurler (1924–1984)

Personal information
- Native name: Micheál Ciniféic (Irish)
- Born: 14 July 1924 Fair Hill, Cork, Ireland
- Died: 20 December 1984 (aged 60) Grenville Place, Cork, Ireland
- Occupation: Secondary school principal

Sport
- Sport: Hurling
- Position: Left wing-forward
Club
- Years: Club
- 1941–1944: St Finbarr's
Club titles
- Cork titles: 2
Inter-county
Years	County	Apps (scores)
1942–1944	Cork	8 (3–06)
Inter-county titles
- Munster titles: 3
- All-Irelands: 2
- NHL: 0

Michael Kenefick (14 July 1924 – 20 December 1984) was an Irish hurler, coach and administrator. At club level he played with St Finbarr's, while he was also a member of the Cork senior hurling team.

Although cut short by injury, Kenefick had a successful career across various levels. A back-to-back Cork SHC-winner, he later won back-to-back All-Ireland SHC medals with Cork and a Railway Cup medal with Munster. Kenefick holds the record as the youngest player ever to captain an All-Ireland SHC-winning team.

As a coach, selector and chairman, Kenefick was involved at all levels with the St Finbarr's club. 30 years after his own playing career ended, he guided the club to two All-Ireland Club SHC titles.

== Club career ==
Kenefick first played hurling and Gaelic football as a schoolboy, at Gerald Griffin Technical School, when his class submitted teams to the North Monastery class leagues and the St Anne's street leagues. He also played juvenile soccer for Celtic United, something which contravened the GAA's ban on playing foreign games.

Kenefick was part of a group of boys who, in 1939, founded a new club, Gerald Griffins, with the help of John Lyons and Jimmy Lynam from the North Monastery. The new club entered the new Cork City Bord na nÓg leagues and ended the year as winners of both the Gaelic football and hurling leagues. Kenefick had further successes in 1940 when William Griffins retained their hurling league title as well as claiming the newly established football championship.

A move to the southside of Cork city resulted in Kenefick joining the St Finbarr's club in 1941. Success was immediate with St Finbarr's claiming the Cork MHC title after a defeat of Cloughduv in the final, while also winning back-to-back Cork MFC titles. Kenefick was still eligible for the minor grade when he joined the club's senior team. He was at centre-back when St Finbarr's beat Ballincollig by 5-07 to 2-02 in the 1942 final. Kenefick claimed a second winners' medal the following year when St Finbarr's beat Ballincollig following a replay.

== Inter-county career ==
Kenefick first played for Cork when he was called-up to the minor team in 1941. He won a Munster MHC medal that year before later lining out at centre-forward in Cork's 5-02 to 2-02 defeat of Kilkenny in the 1941 All-Ireland minor final.

With the All-Ireland MHC suspended due to the Emergency in 1942, the 17-year-old Kenefick was suggested as a possibility for Cork's senior team. After a successful debut marking Mick Mackey in the 1942 Munster semi-final, he ended the campaign with his first Munster SHC medal after a defeat of Tipperary in that year's Munster final. Kenefick subsequently claimed All-Ireland SHC honours when Dublin were beaten by 2-14 to 3-04 in the 1942 All-Ireland final.

The success of St Finbarr's at club level meant that the captaincy of Cork's senior team passed to Kenefick in 1943. After claiming a second successive Munster SHC title, he later captained Cork to a 5-16 to 0-04 victory over Antrim in the 1943 All-Ireland final. At just 19 years and 52 days, he was, and remains, the youngest ever All-Ireland-winning captain. Kenefick retained his place on the Cork team in 1944, however, his wrist was broken by James Ryan in Cork's Munster semi-final defeat of Tipperary. In spite of spending 18 months in plaster, the injury did not heal sufficiently to allow him play again.

== Inter-provincial career ==
Kenefick's performances at inter-county level resulted in his selection for Munster in 1943. He was a non-playing substitute when Munster beat Leinster by 4-03 to 3-05 in the 1943 Railway Cup final.

== Coaching career ==
Kenefick's coaching career began in 1974 when he took charge of the St Finbarr's senior team. It was a successful period for the club with both the Cork SHC and Munster Club SHC titles being won. Kenefick's side subsequently beat Fenians in the 1975 All-Ireland club final. He was later elected club chairman. Kenefick was a selector in 1977 when St Finbarr's beat Glen Rovers in front of a record final attendance to claim the Cork SHC title once again. St. Finbarr's later reclaimed the Munster club title after a defeat of Sixmilebridge, before Kenefick's side won a second All-Ireland club title when Rathnure were beaten in the 1978 All-Ireland club final.

== Personal life and death ==
Kenefick was born in Fair Hill on Cork's northside in July 1924. His father, Dan Kenefick, played with the St Mary's club and was on the Cork team beaten by Kilkenny in the 1912 All-Ireland final.

After leaving school Kenefick worked as a carpenter. Out of work for two years after his hurling career-ending wrist injury, he returned to the building trade where he worked with Sisks. Kenefick later embarked on a teaching career and, after spending two years training in Gorey, he took up a position as a woodwork teacher in County Mayo in 1961. He later moved to the vocational school in Cullen, County Cork before becoming principal of Midleton Vocational School in 1971.

Kennefick and his wife had nine children. His son, Niall Kenefick, was an All-Ireland Club SHC-winner with St Finbarr's and also won a National Hurling League medal with Cork. His son-in-law, Jimmy Barry-Murphy, was a dual All-Ireland-winner with Cork. A grandson, Brian Barry-Murphy, played soccer with Cork City, Preston North End and Bury, before becoming involved in management with Manchester City EDS.

Kennefick died following a brain haemorrhage on 20 December 1984, at the age of 60.

== Honours ==
=== Player ===
St Finbarr's

- Cork Senior Hurling Championship: 1942, 1943
- Cork Minor Hurling Championship: 1941
- Cork Minor Football Championship: 1941, 1942

Cork

- All-Ireland Senior Hurling Championship: 1942, 1943 (c)
- Munster Senior Hurling Championship: 1942, 1943 (c), 1944
- All-Ireland Minor Hurling Championship: 1941
- Munster Minor Hurling Championship: 1941

Munster

- Railway Cup: 1943

=== Management ===
St. Finbarr's

- All-Ireland Senior Club Hurling Championship: 1975, 1978
- Munster Senior Club Hurling Championship: 1975, 1978
- Cork Senior Hurling Championship: 1974, 1977

Sporting positions
Preceded by Jack Lynch	Cork senior hurling team captain 1943	Succeeded by Seán Condon
Achievements
Preceded by Jack Lynch	All-Ireland Senior Hurling Final winning captain 1943	Succeeded by Seán Condon
