= GAA Beo =

Gaelic games television programme

- Genre: Gaelic games
- Presented by: Mícheál Ó Domhnaill
- Starring: Analysts: John Allen; Jarlath Burns; Kevin Cassidy; Pat Fleury; Coman Goggins; Mark Harte; Diarmuid Lyng; Aodán Mac Gearailt; Cathal Moore; Mícheál Ó Cróinín; Tomás Ó Flatharta; Donal O'Grady; Michael Rice; Liam Rushe
- Narrated by: Gearóid Mac Donncha; Mac Dara Mac Donncha; Marcus Ó Buachalla; Cuán Ó Flatharta; Brian Tyers
- Country of origin: Ireland
- Original language: Irish

Production
- Production company: Nemeton TV

Original release
- Network: TG4
- Release: 17 September 2000 – present

Related
- Ard san Aer; Seó Spóirt; Peil na mBan Beo; GAA 2018

GAA Beo (Live GAA) is the principal Gaelic games programme of Irish language-broadcaster TG4.

Typically, it is shown on TG4 on a regular basis on Saturday and Sunday afternoons, as well as midweek, all year round showing live and deferred coverage of hurling and Gaelic football matches in the club championships, National Leagues, Fitzgibbon Cup and Sigerson Cup, as well as the provincial and All-Ireland Championships at minor, under-20 and under-21 levels.

== History ==
=== Beginnings ===
A week after its launch on 31 October 1996, Teilifís na Gaeilge (TnaG) broadcast its first Gaelic games-themed programme. Ard san Aer, a weekly studio-based programme presented by Cynthia Ní Mhurchú, featured special guests who discussed their favourite sporting memories. The programme lasted for one season.

TnaG's first foray into live Gaelic games broadcasting occurred over the June Bank Holiday weekend in 1997 when the fledgling station provided five hours of coverage of the Comórtas Peile na Gaeltachta.

Ard san Aer returned with a new format in October 1998. Mícheál Ó Domhnaill, who previously presented the Spanish football programme Olé, Olé, presented the new version of the programme. Broadcast on Wednesday evenings, the programme initially featured highlights of the previous weekends' games in the club championships and National Leagues. The programme was later expanded to feature highlights of inter-county championship games during the summer months.

The first live edition of Ard san Aer Beo was broadcast on 3 October 1999 and featured coverage of the Offaly Senior Hurling Championship final between Birr and St. Rynagh's.

=== Development ===
Ard san Aer Beo proved to be an instant success due to the fact that TG4's television rivals did not show live broadcasts of club championship or National League games. In 1999 the programme underwent a re-branding and was renamed GAA Beo, however, Ard san Aer remained as the name of the mid-week highlights programme. The first edition of the newly styled GAA Beo was broadcast on TG4 on 17 September 2000 and showed live coverage of the Meath Senior Football Championship final between Dunshaughlin and Kilmainhamwood.

== Coverage ==
Games from the following competitions are regularly shown on GAA Beo:

- National Football League
- National Hurling League
- Christy Ring Cup
- Nicky Rackard Cup
- Lory Meagher Cup
- All-Ireland Under-21 Football Championship
- All-Ireland Under-21 Hurling Championship
- Leinster Under-21 Hurling Championship
- Munster Under-21 Hurling Championship
- All-Ireland Minor Football Championship
- All-Ireland Minor Hurling Championship
- All-Ireland Senior Club Football Championship
- Connacht Senior Club Football Championship
- Leinster Senior Club Football Championship
- Munster Senior Club Football Championship
- Ulster Senior Club Football Championship
- All-Ireland Senior Club Hurling Championship
- Leinster Senior Club Hurling Championship
- Munster Senior Club Hurling Championship
- County Senior Football Championships
- County Senior Hurling Championships
- Sigerson Cup
- Fitzgibbon Cup
- Comórtas Peile na Gaeltachta
