= Kennefick =

Kennefick is a surname of Welsh/Irish origin. It is derived from the town of Kenfig Hill in Bridgend County, South Wales.

People with the surname Kennefick include:

- Victoria Kennefick (fl. 2015), Irish poet and academic
- Irish hurlers
  - Dan Kennefick (5 May 1888 – 29 May 1960)
  - Mick Kennefick (14 July 1924 – 20 December 1984)
  - Cornelius "Niall" G. Kennefick (born 1958)
  - Simon Kennefick (born 1999)
- Physicists
  - Julia Kennefick, (fl. 1995 -) Associate Professor at the University of Arkansas
  - Dan Kennefick, (fl. 2016 -) Professor at the University of Arkansas

== See also ==
- Kennewick, Washington and related articles
