= Dónal O'Grady =

Irish hurler & manager (born 1953)

Personal information
- Native name: Dónall Ó Gráda (Irish)
- Born: 31 December 1953 (age 72) Cork, Ireland
- Occupation: Retired school principal
- Height: 5 ft 10 in (178 cm)

Sport
- Sport: Hurling
- Position: Full-back
Clubs
- Years: Club
- 1973–1987 1975: St Finbarr's → University College Cork
Club titles
	Football	Hurling
Cork titles	3	6
Munster titles	2	3
All-Ireland titles	2	2
College
- Years: College
- University College Cork
College titles
- Fitzgibbon titles: 0
Inter-county
Years	County	Apps (scores)
1977–1984	Cork	10 (0-00)
Inter-county titles
- Munster titles: 4
- All-Irelands: 1
- NHL: 1
- All Stars: 0

Daniel J. O'Grady (born 31 December 1953), known as Dónal O'Grady, is an Irish former hurler and manager. At club level he was a dual player with St. Finbarr's, while he was also a member of the Cork senior hurling team.

O'Grady enjoyed a hugely successful club career with St. Finbarr's. A dual All-Ireland club medal-winner, he also won Munster club titles and a total of nine Cork county medals across both codes. As an inter-county full-back, O'Grady captained Cork to a National League title and won four Munster SHC medals, before crowning his career with an All-Ireland SHC victory in centenary year in 1984.

As a coach, O'Grady has been involved at all levels with the St. Finbarr's club. 20 years after winning an All-Ireland title as a player, he managed Cork to All-Ireland glory in 2005. O'Grady also took charge of Limerick as manager and joint-manager on two separate occasions.

== Early life ==
Born and raised in Cork, O'Grady first played as a schoolboy in various juvenile competitions before later lining out as a student at the North Monastery. He was a member of the North Mon team, captained by his brother Des, that won Harty Cup and Croke Cup titles in 1970.

== Club career ==
O'Grady's club career began at juvenile and underage levels as a dual player with the St. Finabrr's club. He was on the St. Finbarr's minor football team that beat Macroom to win the Cork MFC title in 1971 before winning a Cork U21FC title in 1973. By that stage O'Grady had joined the club's top adult teams in both codes.

O'Grady had his first senior success in 1974 when he was a substitute on the St. Finbarr's team that beat Blackrock to claim the Cork SHC title. After playing just one game during that campaign, a number of injuries to the more regular players allowed O'Grady establish himself on the starting fifteen as St. Finbarr's won the subsequent Munster Club SHC title. He was at centre-back when St. Finbarr's beat Fenians in the 1975 All-Ireland club final.

A proposed transfer to the University College Cork club in 1975 never materialised, with O'Grady remaining with St. Finbarr's. He claimed a Cork SFC medal after a defeat of St. Michael's in the 1976 final. O'Grady won a second Cork SHC medal in 1977 when Glen Rovers were beaten in front of a record final attendance. St. Finbarr's later reclaimed the Munster club title after a defeat of Sixmilebridge, before O'Grady won a second All-Ireland club winners' medal when Rathnure were beaten in the 1978 All-Ireland club final.

O'Grady added to his medal collection in 1979 when he won a second Cork SFC title after a defeat of Castlehaven in the final. He later became a dual Munster Club medal-winner when St. Finbarr's beat Kilrush Shamrocks to win the provincial title. O'Grady was at corner-back when St. Finbarr's won the All-Ireland Club SFC title after a ten-point defeat of St. Grellan's in 1980.

The 1980–81 season proved to be a hugely successful one for O'Grady. St. Finbarr's won a Cork double of football and hurling titles, with O'Grady lining out in both finals with defeats of Glen Rovers and UCC. He later won a second consecutive Munster club medal in football and a third Munster club medal in hurling as St. Finbarr's secured a provincial double. The club narrowly missed out on an All-Ireland double, with O'Grady claiming a second successive All-Ireland club football medal before losing the 1981 All-Ireland club hurling final to Ballyhale Shamrocks.

O'Grady was selected as captain of the St. Finbarr's senior hurling team for 1981. That year he won his fourth Cork SHC medal as St. Finbarr's retained the title after beating Glen Rovers in the final. O'Grady claimed a sixth winners' medal when St. Finbarr's made it three titles in-a-row with a five-point win over Blackrock in the 1982 final.

Four-in-a-row proved beyond St. Finbarr's, however, O'Grady brought his Cork SHC medal tally to six when he lined out at full-back in a 1–15 to 2–04 defeat of Ballyhea in the 1984 final. A recurring back injury resulted in O'Grady retiring from club activity in 1985.

== Inter-county career ==
O'Grady was somewhat overlooked at underage levels, but was called up to the Cork under-21 football team in 1973 and won a Munster U21FC medal that year as a non-playing substitute. He first appeared at senior level with Cork during the 1977–78 National Hurling League. O'Grady was retained for the subsequent Munster SHC campaign and won his first provincial medal as a non-playing substitute when Cork beat Clare by two points in the 1978 Munster final. He failed to make the matchday panel of 21 players when Cork beat Kilkenny in the 1978 All-Ireland final.

As a result of St. Finbarr's winning the 1980 Cork SHC title, O'Grady was nominated as Cork team captain for the 1981 season. It was a successful start to the season, with O'Grady claiming his first national title after Cork beat Offaly by 3–11 to 2–08 to win the 1980–81 National League title. He found it difficult to retain a place on the starting fifteen but won a second Munster SHC medal, his first on the field of play, after coming on as a substitute when Cork beat Waterford by 31 points in the 1982 Munster final. O'Grady was an unused substitute when Cork were beaten by Kilkenny in the 1982 All-Ireland final.

O'Grady took over from Martin O'Doherty as Cork's first choice full-back in 1982. He won a third Munster SHC medal that year as Cork retained the provincial title after a second consecutive defeat of Waterford. O'Grady later lined out in his first All-Ireland final, however, Cork suffered a second consecutive defeat by Kilkenny.

O'Grady won a fourth Munster SHC medal overall after Cork completed a provincial three-in-a-row with a defeat of Tipperary in the 1984 Munster final. He ended the season with an All-Ireland medal after lining out at full-back in the 3–16 to 1–12 defeat of Offaly in the 1984 All-Ireland final.

== Managerial career ==
=== Early experience ===
As a teacher, O'Grady was involved in coaching hurling, Gaelic football and camogie at schools' level. As coach for the North Monastery senior hurling team, he guided the school to the Croke Cup title in 1980, as well as winning consecutive Harty Cup titles. O'Grady was also heavily involved in coaching the juvenile section of the St. Finbarr's club. Together with Jimmy Barry-Murphy, he steered the club's minor team to three consecutive Cork MHC titles from 1990 to 1992. O'Grady coached Youghal to the Cork IHC title in 1993.

=== Cork ===
O'Grady's inter-county career had just ended when he was elected to the selection committee of the Cork senior hurling team in October 1985. As part of the committee, he helped guide Cork to a record-equalling fifth successive Munster SHC title before beating Galway in the 1986 All-Ireland final.

O'Grady was ratified as Cork senior hurling team manager on 23 December 2002. His appointment came immediately after the ending of strike by the entire 30-man Cork panel. O'Grady gave debuts to new players Tom Kenny, Ronan Curran and Setanta Ó hAilpín, while John Gardiner found a regular place on the team as Cork went on to beat Waterford in the 2003 Munster final. O'Grady's side were later beaten by Kilkenny in the 2003 All-Ireland final.

Personnel changes in O'Grady's second season in charge saw Setanta Ó hAilpín leave for an Aussie Rules career, while Brian Corcoran returned after a brief retirement. Cork lost the 2004 Munster final to Waterford but later qualified for the All-Ireland final. The 0–17 to 0–09 victory gave O'Grady an All-Ireland title as manager. He stepped down shortly after the victory.

O'Grady returned to the Cork senior hurling backroom team as a coach in January 2021. He provided video analysis to players during that year's COVID-19 lockdown, before later working as a defensive coach. Cork reached the 2021 All-Ireland final, only to lose to Limerick by 3–32 to 1-22.

=== Limerick ===
O'Grady was appointed Limerick senior hurling team manager in September 2010. In similar circumstances to his appointment as Cork manager eight years earlier, the Limerick players had also been on strike before the removal of Justin McCarthy as manager. O'Grady enjoyed some early season success when Limerick secured the Division 2 title of the National League. He stepped down as manager in September 2011.

After two seasons away from inter-county management, O'Grady returned to the Limerick senior team as joint-manager and coach with T. J. Ryan. He resigned from his position in April 2014 in a dispute with the Limerick County Board, in which comments allegedly made by the management team apologising to the board for Limerick's poor display in the National League appeared in the media.

== Media career ==
O'Grady replaced Éamonn Cregan as resident hurling analyst on RTÉ's The Sunday Game in April 1987. He later joined Irish language channel TG4 as an analyst and co-commentator on GAA Beo, as well as appearing on Seó Spóirt. He continued in this capacity after returning to the Sunday Game in 2005. O'Grady also wrote a regular hurling column in the Irish Examiner.

== Personal life ==
O'Grady was born in Cork in December 1953. His father, Jim O'Grady, was a stalwart of the St Finbarr's club who was also an All-Ireland SHC-winner with Cork in 1952. An uncle, Kevin McGrath, was the first player to win three All-Ireland MHC medals.

After qualifying as a secondary school teacher from University College Cork in 1975, O'Grady's first post was a two-year stint at Mallow Vocational School. He later spent 15 years at Gaelcholáiste Mhuire, before being appointed principal of Youghal Technical College in 1992. After five years in this role, O'Grady took over as principal at Scoil Mhuire gan Smál in Blarney. He later became principal of Gaelcholáiste Mhuire AG at the North Monastery before retiring in 2010.

In January 2017, O'Grady was diagnosed with colon cancer. An operation in March 2017 to remove the tumour was followed by six months of chemotherapy.

== Managerial statistics ==
As of match played 20 April 2014.

Team	From	To	Championship					League				
Team	From	To	M	W	D	L	Win %	M	W	D	L	Win %
Cork	23 December 2002	4 October 2004	12	9	1	2	75%	13	10	1	2	76%
Limerick	22 September 2010	6 September 2011	4	2	0	2	50%	8	8	0	0	100%
Limerick	6 November 2013	20 April 2014	0	0	0	0	0	6	3	2	1	50%

== Honours ==
=== Player ===
North Monastery

- Dr Croke Cup: 1970
- Dr Harty Cup: 1970

St. Finbarr's

- All-Ireland Senior Club Football Championship: 1980, 1981
- All-Ireland Senior Club Hurling Championship: 1975, 1978
- Munster Senior Club Football Championship: 1979, 1980
- Munster Senior Club Hurling Championship: 1975, 1978, 1980
- Cork Senior Football Championship: 1976, 1979, 1980
- Cork Senior Hurling Championship: 1974, 1977, 1980, 1981 (c), 1982, 1984
- Cork Under-21 Football Championship: 1973
- Cork Minor Football Championship: 1971

Cork

- All-Ireland Senior Hurling Championship: 1984
- Munster Senior Hurling Championship: 1978, 1982, 1983, 1984
- National Hurling League: 1980–81 (c)
- Munster Under-21 Football Championship: 1974

=== Management ===
North Monastery

- Dr Croke Cup: 1980
- Dr Harty Cup: 1980, 1981

St. Finbarr's

- Cork Minor Hurling Championship: 1990, 1991, 1992

Youghal

- Cork Intermediate Hurling Championship: 1993

Cork

- All-Ireland Senior Hurling Championship: 1986, 2004
- Munster Senior Hurling Championship: 1986, 2003

Limerick

- National Hurling League Division 2: 2010

Sporting positions
Preceded by Dermot Mac Curtain	Cork senior hurling team captain 1981	Succeeded by Jimmy Barry-Murphy
Preceded by Bertie Óg Murphy	Cork senior hurling team manager 2002–2004	Succeeded by John Allen
Preceded by Justin McCarthy	Limerick senior hurling team manager 2010–2011	Succeeded by John Allen
Preceded by John Allen	Limerick senior hurling team joint-manager 2013–2014	Succeeded by T. J. Ryan
Achievements
Preceded by Brian Cody	All-Ireland Senior Hurling Final winning manager 2004	Succeeded by John Allen
