= Niall Kenefick =

Irish hurler

Personal information
- Native name: Niall Ciniféic (Irish)
- Born: 1958 Cork, Ireland
- Occupation: Education administrator

Sport
- Sport: Hurling
- Position: Centre-back
Club
- Years: Club
- St Finbarr's
Club titles
- Cork titles: 6
- Munster titles: 2
- All-Ireland Titles: 1
Inter-county
Years	County	Apps (scores)
1980-1981	Cork	0 (0-00)
Inter-county titles
- Munster titles: 0
- All-Irelands: 0
- NHL: 1
- All Stars: 0

Cornelius G. Kenefick (born 1958), known as Niall Kenefick, was an Irish hurler who played at club level with St Finbarr's and at senior inter-county level with the Cork county team. He usually lined out as a defender.

== Career ==
Kenefick first came to hurling prominence with the St Finbarr's club. After progressing through the juvenile and underage ranks he eventually progressed onto the club's senior team which coincided with a hugely successful era for the club. He won an All-Ireland Club Championship title in 1979, while he also won a club joint-record of six Cork SHC titles. Kenefick first appeared at inter-county level during an unsuccessful two-year tenure with the Cork under-21 hurling team. He joined the Cork senior hurling team during their successful 1980-81 National League campaign and was later an unused substitute in the Munster Championship.

== Personal life ==
Kenefick's father, Mick Kenefick, captained Cork to victory over Antrim in the 1943 All-Ireland final. His grandfather, Dan Kenefick, was part of the Cork team beaten by Kilkenny in the 1912 All-Ireland final. Kenefick's brother-in-law, Jimmy Barry-Murphy, was a dual All-Ireland-winner with Cork.

== Honours ==
St Finbarr's

- All-Ireland Senior Hurling Championship: 1978
- Munster Senior Hurling Championship: 1977, 1980
- Cork Senior Hurling Championship: 1977, 1980, 1981, 1982, 1984, 1988

Cork

- National Hurling League: 1980-81
