= GAA... (TV programme) =

Gaelic games highlights television programme

- Genre: Gaelic games
- Narrated by: Gearóid Mac Donncha; Mac Dara Mac Donncha; Marcus Ó Buachalla; Cuán Ó Flatharta; Brian Tyers; Cormac Mac Murchú
- Country of origin: Republic of Ireland
- Original language: Irish

Production
- Producers: Isabel Leahy, Donie Mac Murchú
- Production company: Nemeton TV

Original release
- Network: TG4
- Release: 10 October 2005 – present

Related
- Ard san Aer; Seó Spóirt; Peil na mBan Beo; GAA Beo

GAA 2026 is a Gaelic games highlights programme on Irish language-broadcaster TG4. The title of the programme changes each year to incorporate the year of broadcast.

Typically, it is shown on TG4 on Monday evenings from 20:00 and shows highlights of hurling and Gaelic football matches in the club championships, National Leagues, Fitzgibbon Cup and Sigerson Cup. During the summers months the programme is styled as Championship... and shows highlights of the provincial and All-Ireland Championships at minor, under-21 and senior levels.
