= 1981–82 Harty Cup =

Hurling tournament

1981–82 Dr Harty Cup
- Teams: 12
- Champions: St Flannan's College (11th title); Peter Leyden (captain)
- Runners-up: North Monastery

The 1981–82 Harty Cup was the 62nd staging of the Harty Cup since its establishment in hurling by the Munster Council of Gaelic Athletic Association in 1918.

North Monastery were the defending champions.

The final was played on 28 March 1982 at the Bruff Grounds between St Flannan's College and the North Monastery, in what was their first meeting in the final in three years. St Flannan's College won the match by 2–07 to 1–07 to claim their 11th title overall and a first title in three years.

== Results ==
=== Final ===
| 28 March 1982 Final | St Flannan's College | 2-07 - 1-07 | North Monastery | Bruff Grounds |
| | D Quirke 2-1, M Kelly 0-4, J Murphy 0-1, T Quinlivan 0-1. | | P Hurley 1-2, J McCarthy 0-2, K Horgan 0-2, D Daly 0-1. | Referee: N Dalton (Limerick) |
