= Ard san Aer =

- Genre: Gaelic games
- Presented by: Cynthia Ní Mhurchú; Mícheál Ó Domhnaill
- Narrated by: Mac Dara Mac Donncha; Brian Tyers
- Country of origin: Republic of Ireland
- Original language: Irish

Production
- Production company: Nemeton TV

Original release
- Network: TG4
- Release: 7 November 1996 – 3 October 2005

Related
- GAA Beo; Seó Spóirt; Peil na mBan Beo; GAA 2018

Ard san Aer (High in the Sky) was an Irish language television programme which showed highlights of Gaelic games.

It was TG4's flagship Gaelic games show from November 1996 to October 2005. Originally a studio-based show which featured interviews with special guests discussing their favourite sporting moments, it later evolved into a weekly highlights programme showing the best of the weekends' Gaelic games action. Live games were also shown under the Ard san Aer Beo banner.

Ard san Aer underwent a revamp in 2005 and was renamed GAA 2005
