= Laochra Gael =

- Genre: sport documentary, biography
- Developed by: Nemeton TV
- Country of origin: Republic of Ireland
- Original languages: Irish; English
- No. of seasons: 22
- No. of episodes: 192

Production
- Executive producer: Irial Mac Murchú
- Production locations: Baile na hAbhann, Galway
- Running time: 25–26 minutes (2001–2017); 52–53 minutes (2018–present)

Original release
- Network: TG4
- Release: 28 May 2001 – present

Laochra Gael (Irish pronunciation: [ˈl̪ˠeːxɾˠə ˈɡeːl̪ˠ]; "Heroes of the Gaels") is an Irish television programme. With the 2022 series its twentieth, the show profiles and celebrates some of the greatest names in Gaelic games (hurling, Gaelic football, ladies' Gaelic football and camogie) since the 1920s; most players are from the 1980s or later due to the lack of archive footage from earlier players. Each of the programmes contains interviews with the subject, archive footage of their exploits on the pitch and an assessment from GAA experts, friends, rivals and teammates. Laochra Gael is produced by Nemeton TV and broadcast on the Irish language television station, TG4.

== Episode list ==
=== Series 1 – 2001 ===
#	Broadcast Date	Player	County	Sport
1	28 May 2001	Ger Loughnane	Clare	hurling
2	4 June 2001	Brian Cody	Kilkenny	hurling
3	11 June 2001	Éamonn Cregan	Limerick	hurling
4	18 June 2001	Pat Fleury	Offaly	hurling
5	26 June 2001	Dermot O'Brien	Louth	Gaelic football
6	9 July 2001	Brian Mullins	Dublin	Gaelic football
7	16 July 2001	Enda Colleran	Galway	Gaelic football
8	23 July 2001	Con Murphy	Cork	hurling
9	30 July 2001	Páidí Ó Sé	Kerry	Gaelic football
10	8 August 2001	John Wilson	Cavan	Gaelic football

=== Series 2 – 2002 ===
#	Broadcast Date	Player	County	Sport
1	28 September 2002	Mick O'Dwyer	Kerry	Gaelic football
2	5 October 2002	Na Connollys (John, Joe, Michael)	Galway	hurling
3	12 October 2002	Martin McHugh	Donegal	Gaelic football
4	19 October 2002	John Doyle	Tipperary	hurling
5	26 October 2002	Jack Lynch	Cork	hurling & Gaelic football
6	2 November 2004	Paddy Doherty	Down	Gaelic football
7	9 November 2002	Eddie Keher	Kilkenny	hurling
8	16 November 2002	Dermot Earley Snr	Roscommon	Gaelic football
9	23 November 2002	Na Rackards (Nicky, Billy, Bobby)	Wexford	hurling
10	30 November 2002	Seán Boylan	Meath	Gaelic football

=== Series 3 – 2004 ===
#	Broadcast Date	Player	County	Sport
1	11 January 2004	Jimmy Keaveney	Dublin	Gaelic football
2	18 January 2004	Joe Cooney	Galway	hurling
3	25 January 2004	Colm O'Rourke	Meath	Gaelic football
4	1 February 2004	Frankie Walsh	Waterford	hurling
5	8 February 2004	Matt Connor	Offaly	Gaelic football
6	15 February 2004	Nicky English	Tipperary	hurling
7	22 February 2004	Billy Morgan	Cork	Gaelic football
8	29 February 2004	Gary Kirby	Limerick	hurling
9	7 March 2004	Tony Doran	Wexford	hurling
10	14 March 2004	Pat Spillane	Kerry	Gaelic football

=== Series 4 – 2004/05 ===
#	Broadcast Date	Player	County	Sport
1	September 2004	Angela Downey & Ann Downey	Kilkenny	camogie
2	12 January 2005	Justin McCarthy	Cork	hurling
3	19 January 2005	Frank McGuigan	Tyrone	Gaelic football
4	26 January 2005	Brian Whelahan	Offaly	hurling
5	2 February 2005	Peter McDermott	Meath	Gaelic football
6	9 February 2005	John Leahy	Tipperary	hurling
7	16 February 2005	Joe Brolly	Derry	Gaelic football
8	23 February 2005	Michael 'Babs' Keating	Tipperary	hurling
9	2 March 2005	Eoin 'Bomber' Liston	Kerry	Gaelic football
10	9 March 2005	Seán Purcell	Galway	Gaelic football

=== Series 5 – 2005/06 ===
#	Broadcast Date	Player	County	Sport
1	25 December 2005	Cormac McAnallen	Tyrone	Gaelic football
2	11 January 2006	Joe Hennessy	Kilkenny	hurling
3	18 January 2006	Dinny Allen	Cork	Gaelic football & hurling
4	25 January 2006	Donie Nealon	Tipperary	hurling
5	1 February 2006	Mattie McDonagh	Galway	Gaelic football
6	8 February 2006	Tomás Mulcahy	Cork	hurling & Gaelic football
7	22 February 2006	Davy Fitzgerald	Clare	hurling
8	1 March 2006	Joe Kernan	Armagh	Gaelic football
9	8 March 2006	Liam Dunne	Wexford	hurling
10	15 March 2006	Willie Joe Padden	Mayo	Gaelic football

=== Series 6 – 2007 ===
#	Broadcast Date	Player	County	Sport
1	10 January 2007	Joe, Johnny & Billy Dooley	Offaly	hurling
2	17 January 2007	John O'Mahony	Galway	Gaelic football
3	16 January 2007	Mickey Linden	Down	Gaelic football
4	23 January 2007	Tony McTague	Offaly	Gaelic football
5	30 January 2007	Tom Cheasty	Waterford	hurling
6	6 February 2007	Mickey Kearns	Sligo	Gaelic football
7	13 February 2007	Nudie Hughes	Monaghan	Gaelic football
8	20 February 2007	Ray Cummins	Cork	hurling & Gaelic football
9	27 February 2007	Charlie Redmond	Dublin	Gaelic football
10	6 March 2007	Tony Keady	Galway	hurling

=== Series 7 – 2008 ===
#	Broadcast Date	Player	County	Sport
1	10 January 2008	Peter Canavan	Tyrone	Gaelic football
2	17 January 2008	Martin Storey	Wexford	hurling
3	24 January 2008	Tony Hanahoe	Dublin	Gaelic football
4	31 January 2008	Mick Lyons	Meath	Gaelic football
5	7 February 2008	Noel Skehan	Kilkenny	hurling
6	14 February 2008	Jack O'Shea	Kerry	Gaelic football
7	21 February 2008	Seán Óg de Paor	Galway	Gaelic football
8	28 February 2008	Anthony Daly	Clare	hurling
9	6 March 2008	Teddy McCarthy	Cork	Gaelic football & hurling
10	13 March 2008	Jimmy Doyle	Tipperary	hurling

=== Series 8 – 2010: Na Coimhlintí Móra (The Sagas) ===
Series 8 featured some of the most well-known rivalries in the games.

#	Broadcast Date	Rivalry	Period	Sport
1	15 April 2010	Kerry vs Offaly	1980–82	Gaelic football
2	22 April 2010	Cork v. Waterford	2000–07	hurling
3	29 April 2010	Tyrone vs Armagh	2003–05	Gaelic football
4	6 May 2010	Cork vs Tipperary	1987–91	hurling
5	13 May 2010	Dublin vs Meath	1991	Gaelic football
6	20 May 2010	Wexford vs Cork	1996–97	hurling
7	27 May 2010	Kildare vs Meath	1997–98	Gaelic football
8	3 June 2010	Galway vs Tipperary	1987–91	hurling
9	10 June 2010	Galway vs Roscommon	1998, 2001	Gaelic football
10	17 June 2010	Kilkenny vs Wexford	1993	hurling

=== Series 9 – 2011: Na Coimhlintí Móra (The Sagas) ===
Series 9 featured more of the most well-known rivalries in the games.

#	Broadcast Date	Rivalry	Period	Sport
1	22 February 2011	10 mBliana de Pheil na mBan ar TG4 (10 Years of Ladies' Gaelic football on TG4)	2001–10	Ladies' Gaelic football
2	6 March 2011	Ulaidh Abú ("Up Ulster!")	1991–94	Gaelic football
3	13 March 2011	Dublin vs Meath	1986–90	Gaelic football
4	20 March 2011	Meat vs Cork	1987–90	Gaelic football
5	27 March 2011	Galway vs Mayo	1995–99	Gaelic football
6	3 April 2011	Offaly vs Kilkenny	1980–83	hurling
7	10 April 2011	Galway vs Limerick	1980–81	Gaelic football
8	17 April 2011	Offaly vs Clare	1998	hurling
9	24 April 2011	Kilkenny vs Cork	1999–2010	hurling
10	1 May 2011	Clare vs Tipperary	1997–2001	hurling

=== Series 10 – 2012 ===
#	Broadcast Date	Player	County	Sport
1	5 April 2012	Dan Shanahan	Waterford	hurling
2	12 April 2012	Oisín McConville	Armagh	Gaelic football
3	19 April 2012	Jimmy Barry Murphy	Cork	hurling & Gaelic football
4	26 April 2012	Mikey Sheehy	Kerry	Gaelic football
5	3 May 2012	D. J. Carey	Kilkenny	hurling
6	10 May 2012	Brian McEniff	Donegal	Gaelic football
7	17 May 2012	Brian Corcoran	Cork	hurling
8	24 May 2012	Liam Hayes	Meath	Gaelic football
9	31 May 2012	Ollie Canning	Galway	hurling
10	7 June 2012	Declan Browne	Tipperary	Gaelic football

=== Series 11 – 2013 ===
#	Broadcast Date	Player	County	Sport
1	14 February 2013	Eddie Brennan	Kilkenny	hurling
2	21 February 2013	Anthony Tohill	Derry	Gaelic football
3	28 February 2013	Damien Fitzhenry	Wexford	hurling
4	7 March 2013	Séamus Moynihan	Kerry	Gaelic football
5	14 March 2013	Gerald McCarthy	Cork	hurling
6	21 March 2013	Jarlath Fallon	Galway	Gaelic football
7	28 March 2013	Paul Flynn	Waterford	hurling
8	4 April 2013	Glenn Ryan	Kildare	Gaelic football
9	11 April 2013	Conor Hayes	Galway	hurling
10	18 April 2013	Juliet Murphy	Cork	ladies' Gaelic football

=== Series 12 – 2014 ===
#	Broadcast Date	Player	County	Sport
1	2 February 2014	John Mullane	Waterford	hurling
2	9 February 2014	James McCartan Sr. & James McCartan Jr.	Down	Gaelic football
3	16 February 2014	Noel Lane	Galway	hurling
4	23 February 2014	Cora Staunton	Mayo	ladies' Gaelic football
5	2 March 2014	Larry Tompkins	Cork	Gaelic football
6	9 March 2014	Seán Óg Ó hAilpín	Cork	hurling & Gaelic football
7	16 March 2014	Paddy Cullen	Dublin	Gaelic football
8	23 March 2014	Brian Lohan	Clare	hurling
9	30 March 2014	Martin O'Connell	Meath	Gaelic football
10	6 April 2014	Willie & Eddie O'Connor	Kilkenny	hurling

=== Series 13 – 2015 ===
#	Broadcast Date	Player	County	Sport
1	3 February 2015	Liam McHale	Mayo	Gaelic football
2	10 February 2015	Ciarán Carey	Limerick	hurling
3	17 February 2015	Jamesie O'Connor	Clare	hurling
4	24 February 2015	Niamh Kindlon	Monaghan	ladies' Gaelic football
5	3 March 2015	Na Larkins (Paddy, Fan, Philly)	Kilkenny	hurling
6	10 March 2015	Barney Rock	Dublin	Gaelic football
7	17 March 2015	Brendan Cummins	Tipperary	hurling
8	31 March 2015	Denis "Ogie" Moran	Kerry	Gaelic football
9	7 April 2015	Michael Duignan	Offaly	hurling & Gaelic football
10	14 April 2015	Ryan McMenamin	Tyrone	Gaelic football

=== Series 14 – 2016 ===
#	Broadcast Date	Player	County	Sport
1	21 February 2016	J. J. Delaney	Kilkenny	hurling
2	28 February 2016	Ken McGrath	Waterford	hurling
3	6 March 2016	Declan O'Sullivan	Kerry	Gaelic football
4	13 March 2016	Richie Bennis	Limerick	hurling
5	20 March 2016	Steven McDonnell	Armagh	Gaelic football
6	27 March 2016	Eoin Kelly	Tipperary	hurling
7	3 April 2016	John Allen	Cork	hurling & Gaelic football
8	10 April 2016	Trevor Giles	Meath	Gaelic football
9	17 April 2016	Annette Clarke	Galway	ladies' Gaelic football
10	24 April 2016	Na Meehans (Declan, Michael, Tomás, Noel)	Galway	Gaelic football

=== Series 15 – 2017 ===
#	Broadcast Date	Player	County	Sport
1	15 March 2017	Donal Óg Cusack	Cork	hurling
2	22 March 2017	Dara Ó Cinnéide	Kerry	Gaelic football
3	29 March 2017	Pete Finnerty	Galway	hurling
4	5 April 2017	Eamonn O'Hara	Sligo	Gaelic football
5	12 April 2017	Tommy Walsh	Kilkenny	hurling
6	19 April 2017	Clíodhna O'Connor	Dublin	ladies' Gaelic football
7	26 April 2017	Pat Fox	Tipperary	hurling
8	3 May 2017	Na Lowrys (Brendan, Seán, Mick)	Offaly/Mayo	Gaelic football
9	10 May 2017	Seánie McMahon	Clare	hurling
10	17 May 2017	Owen Mulligan	Tyrone	Gaelic football

=== Series 16 – 2018 ===
This season saw a switch to an hour-long format.

#	Broadcast Date	Title	County	Sport
1	28 February 2018	Understanding Lar Corbett; Ag Tuiscint Lar Corbett	Tipperary	hurling
2	7 March 2018	The Real Graham Geraghty; An Fíor Graham Geraghty	Meath	Gaelic football
3	14 March 2018	Ashling Thompson — Warrior Woman; Ashling Thompson — Gaiscíoch Ban	Cork	camogie
4	21 March 2018	Henry Shefflin — King of the Cats; Henry Shefflin — Rí na gCat	Kilkenny	hurling
5	28 March 2018	Mickey Harte — Unquenchable Spirit; Mickey Harte — Spioraid Dochloite	Tyrone	Gaelic football

=== Series 17 – 2019 ===
#	Broadcast Date	Subject	County	Sport
1	20 February 2019	Jackie Tyrrell – The Journey; Jackie Tyrrell – An Aistear	Kilkenny	hurling
2	27 February 2019	Séamus Darby – The Man Who Got the Goal; Séamus Darby – An Fear a Scóráil an Cúl	Offaly	Gaelic football
3	6 March 2019	Rena Buckley – The Best Person in the World? Rena Buckley – An Duine is Fearr ar Domhain?	Cork	ladies' Gaelic football & camogie
4	13 March 2019	Kieran Duff – Don't Judge Me; Kieran Duff – Ná Tabhair Breith Orm	Dublin	Gaelic football
5	20 March 2019	Andrew O'Shaughnessy – Shaughs' Story; Andrew O'Shaughnessy – An Mórphictúir	Limerick	hurling
6	27 March 2019	Colm Cooper – Gooch	Kerry	Gaelic football

=== Series 18 – 2020 ===
#	Broadcast Date	Subject	County	Sport
1	5 March 2020	Kieran Donaghy — On the Edge; Kieran Donaghy — Ar an Imeall	Kerry	Gaelic football
2	12 March 2020	Diarmuid Lyng — The Crossroads; Diarmuid Lyng — An Crosbhóthar	Wexford	hurling
3	19 March 2020	Alan Brogan — The Family Silver; Alan Brogan — Saibhreas Clainne	Dublin	Gaelic football
4	26 March 2020	Iggy Clarke — Body and Soul; Iggy Clarke — Corp agus Anam	Galway	hurling
5	2 April 2020	David Brady — Against the Tide; David Brady — In Aghaidh an Easa	Mayo	Gaelic football
6	9 April 2020	Brenda McAnespie — Beyond Borders; Brenda McAnespie — Thar Teorainn Amach	Monaghan	ladies' Gaelic football

=== Series 19 – 2021 ===
This season was broadcast in two parts of six episodes. The second part of the nineteenth series began on 25 March 2021.

#	Broadcast Date	Player	County	Sport
1	7 January 2021	Kevin Cassidy	Donegal	Gaelic football
2	14 January 2021	Ryan O'Dwyer	Dublin	hurling
3	21 January 2021	Therese Maher	Galway	camogie
4	28 January 2021	Shane Curran	Roscommon	Gaelic football
5	4 February 2021	Johnny Pilkington	Offaly	hurling
6	11 February 2021	Dermot Earley Jnr	Kildare	Gaelic football
7	25 March 2021	Eoin Larkin	Kilkenny	hurling
8	1 April 2021	Pete McGrath	Down	Gaelic football
9	8 April 2021	Briege Corkery	Cork	ladies' Gaelic football & camogie
10	15 April 2021	Bernard Flynn	Meath	Gaelic football
11	22 April 2021	Seán Cavanagh	Tyrone	Gaelic football
12	29 April 2021	Liam Griffin	Wexford	hurling

=== Series 20 – 2022 ===
#	Broadcast Date	Player	County	Sport
1	13 January 2022	Terence McNaughton	Antrim	hurling
2	20 January 2022	Michael Darragh MacAuley	Dublin	Gaelic football
3	27 January 2022	Sue Ramsbottom	Laois	ladies' Gaelic football
4	3 February 2022	Joe Quaid	Limerick	hurling
5	10 February 2022	Kieran Fitzgerald	Galway	Gaelic football
6	17 February 2022	Johnny McGurk	Derry	Gaelic football

=== Series 21 – 2023 ===
#	Broadcast Date	Player	County	Sport
1	26 January 2023	Joe Canning	Galway	hurling
2	2 February 2023	Aidan O’Mahony	Kerry	Gaelic football
3	9 February 2023	Anne Dalton	Kilkenny	camogie
4	16 February 2023	Tom Parsons	Mayo	Gaelic football
5	23 February 2023	Áine Wall	Waterford	ladies' Gaelic football
6	2 March 2023	Liam Sheedy	Tipperary	hurling
7	9 March 2023	Anthony Molloy	Donegal	Gaelic football
8	16 March 2023	Noel O’Leary	Cork	Gaelic football

=== Series 22 – 2024 ===
#	Broadcast Date	Player	County	Sport
1	25 January 2024	Richie Power Jnr	Kilkenny	hurling
2	1 February 2024	Tony Scullion	Derry	Gaelic football and hurling
3	8 February 2024	Lindsay Peat	Dublin	ladies' Gaelic football
4	15 February 2024	Tony Griffin	Clare	hurling
5	22 February 2024	Alan Kerins	Galway	hurling and Gaelic football
6	29 February 2024	Pat Critchley	Laois	hurling
7	7 March 2024	Ciara Gaynor	Tipperary	camogie
8	14 March 2024	Kevin Hughes	Tyrone	Gaelic football

=== Series 23 – 2025 ===
#	Broadcast Date	Player	County	Sport
1	23 January 2025	Pádraic Maher	Tipperary	hurling
2	30 January 2025	Marc Ó Sé	Kerry	football
3	6 February 2025	Ursula Jacob	Wexford	camogie
4	13 February 2025	Rónán Clarke	Armagh	football
5	20 February 2025	Michael Bond	Galway	hurling
6	27 February 2025	Bríd Stack	Cork	ladies' Gaelic Football
7	6 March 2025	Ben O'Connor; Jerry O'Connor	Cork	hurling
8	13 March 2025	Eamon McGee	Donegal	football

=== Series 24 – 2026 ===
#	Broadcast Date	Player	County	Sport
1	22 January 2026	Conor McManus	Monaghan	football
2	29 January 2026	Cyril Farrell	Galway	hurling
3	5 February 2026	Grace Walsh	Kilkenny	camogie
4	12 February 2026	Marty Clarke	Down	Gaelic football and Aussie rules
5	19 February 2026	Pádraig Horan	Offaly	hurling
6	26 February 2026	Neil McManus	Antrim	hurling
7	5 March 2026	Louise Ní Mhuircheartaigh	Kerry	ladies' Gaelic Football
8	12 March 2026	Kevin McManamon	Dublin	football
