= Jim O'Grady (hurler) =

Irish hurler (1922–1986)

Personal information
- Native name: Séamus Ó Gráda (Irish)
- Born: 4 October 1922 Cloughduv, County Cork, Ireland
- Died: 4 February 1986 (aged 64) Wellington Road, Cork, Ireland

Sport
- Sport: Hurling
- Position: Right wing-back
Clubs
- Years: Club
- Cloughduv; Canovee; St. Finbarr's
Club titles
- Cork titles: 1
Inter-county*
Years	County	Apps (scores)
1951-1952	Cork	0 (0-00)
Inter-county titles
- Munster titles: 1
- All-Irelands: 1
- NHL: 0
- *Inter County team apps and scores correct as of 15:45, 4 April 2023.

James O'Grady (4 October 1922 – 4 February 1986) was an Irish hurler. At club level he played with Cloughduv, Canovee and St. Finbarr's, while at inter-county level he lined out with the Cork senior hurling team.

== Career ==
O'Grady first played hurling at club level with Cloughduv. He was part of the club's minor team that won numerous Mid Cork MHC titles and lined out in the Cork MHC final defeat by Glen Rovers in 1938. O'Grady was just out of the underage grade when he won a Cork IHC title in 1941. He also played Gaelic football with Canovee and won Mid Cork JFC titles around this time.

A lack of employment opportunities during the Emergency resulted in O'Grady emigrating to England for a period. On his return he re-joined the Cloughduv club but later transferred to St. Finbarr's in Togher. O'Grady soon came to the notice of the inter-county selectors and he was a non-playing substitute when Cork beat Dublin in the 1952 All-Ireland final. He later won a Cork SHC medal with St. Finbarr's in 1955.

== Post-playing career ==
In retirement from playing, O'Grady became involved in the administrative and coaching affairs of the game. He was chairperson of the juvenile section of the St. Finbarr's club for a number of years and also served as club delegate to the County Board. O'Grady also served as an inter-county selector at all levels. He was part of the selections teams that won All-Ireland MHC titles in 1978 and 1979 and an All-Ireland U21HC title in 1982. O'Grady was also a senior team selector when Cork lost All-Ireland finals in 1969 and 1983.

== Personal life and death ==
O'Grady married Catherine McGrath in Cork in 1949. His brother-in-law, Kevin McGrath, was the first player to win three All-Ireland MHC medals. His son, Donal O'Grady, is an All-Ireland SHC-winning player and manager, while another son, Des O'Grady, played Gaelic football with Cork.

O'Grady died after a period of illness on 4 February 1986, at the age of 64.

== Honours ==
=== Player ===
Cloughduv

- Cork Intermediate Hurling Championship: 1941

St. Finbarr's

- Cork Senior Hurling Championship: 1955

Cork

- All-Ireland Senior Hurling Championship: 1952
- Munster Senior Hurling Championship: 1952
- All-Ireland Junior Hurling Championship: 1947
- Munster Junior Hurling Championship: 1947

=== Management ===
Cork

- Munster Senior Hurling Championship: 1969, 1983
- National Hurling League: 1968–69
- All-Ireland Under-21 Hurling Championship: 1982
- Munster Under-21 Hurling Championship: 1982
- All-Ireland Minor Hurling Championship: 1978, 1979
- Munster Minor Hurling Championship: 1978, 1979
