= 2008–09 Harty Cup =

2008–09 Dr Harty Cup
- Dates: September 2008 – 8 March 2009
- Champions: Thurles CBS (7th title)
- Runners-up: St Caimin's CS

The 2008–09 Harty Cup was the 89th staging of the Harty Cup since its establishment in hurling by the Munster Council of Gaelic Athletic Association in 1918.

De La Salle College Waterford were the defending champions.

The final was played on 8 March 2009 at MacDonagh Park in Nenagh, between Thurles CBS and St Caimin's Community School, in what was their first ever meeting in the final. Thurles CBS College won the match by 3–15 to 0–09 to claim their seventh Harty Cup title overall and a first title in 53 years.

== Knockout stage ==
=== Final ===
8 March 2009 Final	Thurles CBS	3-15 - 0-09	St Caimin's Community School	MacDonagh Park
	D Butler & A McCormack 1-1 each, K Morris 0-4 (2f), M O'Brien 1-0, J O'Neill 0-3, D Fogarty 0-2, P Molloy, D Maher, M Bracken & P Greene 0-1 each.	Report	P Sheahan 0-8 (6f), D O'Connor 0-1.
