= Tim Nagle =

Irish hurler

Personal information
- Native name: Tadhg de Nógla (Irish)
- Born: 25 October 1894 Mallow, County Cork, Ireland
- Died: 6 January 1925 (aged 30) Wellington Road, Cork, Ireland
- Occupation: Blacksmith

Sport
- Sport: Hurling
- Position: Midfield
Club
- Years: Club
- St Mary's
Club titles
- Cork titles: 0
- All-Ireland Titles: 2
Inter-county
| Years | County | Apps (scores) |
| 1912-1922 | Cork | 17 (1-05) |
Inter-county titles
- Munster titles: 3
- All-Irelands: 2

Timothy Nagle (25 October 1894 – 6 January 1925) was an Irish hurler. His championship career with the Cork senior team lasted from 1912 until 1922.

Nagle first played competitive inter-county hurling at the age of eighteen, when he was selected for the Cork senior team. He made his debut in the 1912 All-Ireland final and, although Cork were defeated on that occasion, he quickly became a regular member of the team. Nagle won All-Ireland medals in 1915 and 1919 in what was his third final appearance. He also won three Munster medals. Nagle played his last game for Cork in April 1922.

== Honours ==
Cork

- All-Ireland Senior Hurling Championship (1): 1919
- Munster Senior Hurling Championship (3): 1915, 1919, 1920
