= 1978–79 Harty Cup =

Hurling tournament

1978–79 Dr Harty Cup
- Dates: October 1978 – 11 March 1979
- Champions: St Flannan's College (1st title); Gerry McInerney (captain)
- Runners-up: North Monastery

The 1978–79 Harty Cup was the 59th staging of the Harty Cup since its establishment in hurling by the Munster Council of the Gaelic Athletic Association in 1918.

Templemore CBS unsuccessfully defended their title in the semi-finals against St Flannan's College, in what was their fourth meeting in the final overall and a first meeting in 1957.

St Flannan's College won in the Harty Cup final on 11 March 1979 at St Ailbe's Park in Emly against North Monastery, 2–11 to 1–03 for their 10th successive Harty Cup title overall and last title since 1976.

== Results ==
=== Final ===
| 11 March 1979 Final | St Flannan's College | 2-11 - 1-03 | North Monastery | St Ailbe's Park |
