= Paddy Healy (St Mary's hurler) =

Irish hurler

Personal information
- Native name: Pádraig Ó hÉilí (Irish)

Sport
- Sport: Hurling
- Position: Centre-forward
Club
- Years: Club
- St Mary's
Club titles
- Cork titles: 0
Inter-county*
Years	County	Apps (scores)
1919	Cork	1 (0–1)
Inter-county titles
- Munster titles: 2
- All-Irelands: 1
- *Inter County team apps and scores correct as of 18:33, 7 April 2018.

Paddy Healy was an Irish hurler. His championship career with the Cork senior team lasted just one season in 1919.

Healy was added to the Cork senior panel for the 1919 championship. It was a successful season for the team, with Healy winning his sole All-Ireland SHC medal that year. He also won one Munster SHC medal.

== Honours ==
Cork

- All-Ireland Senior Hurling Championship (1): 1919
- Munster Senior Hurling Championship (1): 1919
