= 1977–78 Harty Cup =

Hurling tournament

1977–78 Dr Harty Cup
- Dates: October 1977 – 16 April 1978
- Champions: Templemore CBS (1st title); Martin Burke (captain)
- Runners-up: St Flannan's College; Seánie McMahon (captain)

The 1977–78 Harty Cup was the 58th staging of the Harty Cup since its establishment in hurling by the Munster Council of the Gaelic Athletic Association in 1918.

St Colman's College unsuccessfully defended its title.

Templemore CBS won the Harty Cup final on 16 April 1978, 3–05 to 2–06, at St Ailbe's Park in Emly, against St Flannan's College, in what was their first ever meeting in the final. It was Templemore CBS first ever Harty Cup title.

== Results ==
=== Final ===
16 April 1977 Final	Templemore CBS	3-05 - 2-06	St Flannan's College	St Ailbe's Park
	N Fogarty 2-0, M Ryan 1-1, E Cody 0-3, P McGrath 0-1.		G McInerney 1-1, D O'Malley 1-0, J Colleran 0-2, B Heffernan 0-2, R Colleran 0-1.
