= 2007–08 Harty Cup =

2007–08 Dr Harty Cup
- Dates: September 2007 – 12 March 2008
- Champions: De La Salle College (2nd title)
- Runners-up: Thurles CBS

The 2007–08 Harty Cup was the 88th staging of the Harty Cup since its establishment in hurling by the Munster Council of Gaelic Athletic Association in 1918.

De La Salle College Waterford were the defending champions.

The final was played on 8 March 2008 at Leahy Park in Cashel, between De La Salle College Waterford and Thurles CBS, in what was their first ever meeting in the final. De La Salle College won the match by 1–11 to 0–07 to claim their second consecutive Harty Cup title.

== Knockout stage ==
=== Final ===
8 March 2008 Final	De La Salle College	1-11 - 0-07	Thurles CBS	Leahy Park
	S Power 0-7 (0-6f, 0-1 sl); P McCarthy 1-2; N Clifford, D Purcell 0-1 each.	Report	D Butler 0-2 (0-2f); K Morris, J Barry (0-1f), C Shelley, C Ryan, J O'Neill 0-1 each.
