= 1979–80 Harty Cup =

Hurling tournament

1979–80 Dr Harty Cup
- Dates: 7 November 1979 – 30 March 1980
- Teams: 9
- Champions: North Monastery (15th title); Jim Murray (captain)
- Runners-up: St Colman's College; Joe Noonan (captain)

Tournament statistics
- Matches played: 9
- Goals scored: 41 (4.56 per match)
- Points scored: 141 (15.67 per match)
- Top scorer(s): Tony O'Sullivan (1-28)

The 1979–80 Harty Cup was the 60th staging of the Harty Cup since its establishment in hurling by the Munster Council of Gaelic Athletic Association in 1918. The competition ran from 7 November 1979 to 30 March 1980.

St Flannan's College unsuccessfully defended its title in the semi-finals against St Colman's College.

North Monastery won in the Harty Cup final replay, 2–10 to 2–05, on 30 March 1980 in Fr Con Buckley Park, Buttevant, against St Colman's, in what was their first ever meeting in the final for their 15th Harty Cup title overall, being their first title since 1970.

North Monastery's Tony O'Sullivan was the top scorer with 1-28.

== Results ==
=== First round ===
7 November 1979 First Round	North Monastery	4-10 - 2-02	St Finbarr's College	Páirc Uí Chaoimh
	T O'Sullivan1 1-6, R Allen 1-1, S Lyons 1-0, T Mulcahy 1-0, P O'Connor 0-1, M Lee 0-1, K Doran 0-1.		B Buckley 1-1, M Lynam 1-0, K Spillane 0-1.

=== Quarter-finals ===
14 November 1979 Quarter-final	St Flannan's College	2-07 - 1-06	De La Salle College Waterford	Canon Hayes Park
	P Collins 2-0, I Conroy 0-3, C Waterstone 0-2, J Morey 0-1, G Corry 0-1.		J McDonald 1-1, R Heffernan 0-3, P Fleming 0-2.

14 November 1979 Quarter-final	St Colman's College	2-16 - 1-06	Thurles CBS	Clonmel GAA Ground
	P Redmond 0-6, J Brosnan 1-1, P Greehy 1-0, J Hedigan 0-2, M Fitzgerald 0-2, R Connolly 0-2, P Hartnett 0-1, N O'Callaghan 0-1, J Noonan 0-1.		M Kenihan 1-0, L Bergin 0-3, J Leahy 0-1, K Carroll 0-1, AJ Callanan 0-1.

14 November 1979 Quarter-final	Templemore CBS	3-06 - 0-12	Coláiste Iognáid Rís	St Ailbe's Park
	E Stapleton 2-0, P Kenny 0-5, J Russell 1-1.		N Goulding 0-5, R Herlihy 0-2, D McCarthy 0-2, D Bevin 0-1, T Linehan 0-1, F Barrett 0-1.

21 November 1979 Quarter-final	Limerick CBS	3-03 - 3-10	North Monastery	Fr Con Buckley Park
	T Hall 1-2, G Butler 1-0, T Ryan 1-0, J Foley 0-1.		T O'Sullivan 0-8, R Allen 1-0, T Mulcahy 1-0, M Lyons 1-0, P O'Connor 0-1, M Lee 0-1.

=== Semi-finals ===
2 March 1980 Semi-final	North Monastery	3-12 - 3-04	Templemore CBS	Canon Hayes Park
	R Allen 2-1, T O'Sullivan 0-6, T Mulcahy 1-0, M Lyons 0-2, M Lee 0-2, S Drinan 0-1.		P Kenny 2-4, G Ryan 1-0.

9 March 1980 Semi-final	St Colman's College	4-05 - 1-12	St Flannan's College	St Ailbe's Park
	M Fitzgerald 2-2, J Brosnan 1-0, B Sherlock 1-0, J Noonan 0-2, N O'Callaghan 0-1.		E Conroy 1-1, B McNamara 0-3, T Howard 0-2, T Mannion 0-2, G Corry 0-2, P Collins 0-1, J Morey 0-1.

=== Final ===
23 March 1980 Final	North Monastery	3-06 - 2-09	St Colman's College	Fr Con Buckley Park
	T Mulcahy 2-0, T O'Sullivan 0-4, R Allen 1-0, P O'Connor 0-1.		J Noonan 1-4, J O'Riordan 1-0, M Fitzgerald 0-2, P Greehy 0-1, P Hartnett 0-1, P Redmond 0-1.	Referee: G Ryan (Tipperary)

30 March 1980 Final replay	North Monastery	2-10 - 2-05	St Colman's College	Fr Con Buckley Park
	R Allen 1-2, T O'Sullivan 0-4, P O'Connor 0-4, T Mulcahy 1-0.		M Fitzgerald 1-1, P Greehy 1-0, J Noonan 0-2, C Clancy 0-1, P Redmond 0-1.	Referee: G Ryan (Tipperary)

== Statistics ==
=== Top scorers ===
Rank	Player	County	Tally	Total	Matches	Average
1	Tony O'Sullivan	North Monastery	1-28	31	4	7.75
2	Robert Allen	North Monastery	6-04	22	4	5.50
3	Tomás Mulcahy	North Monastery	6-00	18	4	4.50
4	Michael Fitzgerald	St Colman's College	3-07	16	4	4.00
5	Philip Kenny	Templemore CBS	2-09	15	2	7.50
