= 1976–77 Harty Cup =

Hurling tournament

1976–77 Dr Harty Cup
- Dates: 13 October 1976 – 13 March 1977
- Teams: 10
- Champions: St Colman's College (3rd title); John Lenihan (captain)
- Runners-up: St Flannan's College; Jarlath Colleran (captain)

Tournament statistics
- Matches played: 10
- Goals scored: 45 (4.5 per match)
- Points scored: 146 (14.6 per match)
- Top scorer(s): Gerard O'Regan (3-17)

The 1976–77 Harty Cup was the 57th staging of the Harty Cup since its establishment in hurling by the Munster Council of the Gaelic Athletic Association in 1918.

St Flannan's College successfully defended its title at the Harty Cup final, 0–07 to 0–03, on 13 March 1977 at St Ailbe's Park in Emly, against St Colman's College, in what was their fourth successive meeting in a final and 28 years since their first final meeting in 1949. It was St Flannan's College third successive Harty Cup title overall and a first title since 1949.

Gerard O'Regan was the top scorer with 3–17.

== Results ==
=== First round ===
20 October 1976 First round	St Colman's College	5-11 - 2-07	North Monastery	St Ailbe's Park
	J Monaghan 2-3, J Boylan 2-1, G O'Regan 1-2, J Hartnett 0-3, S O'Brien 0-1, M Lyons 0-1.		M Fitzgerald 1-2, J Keane 1-0, G O'Callaghan 0-2, T Deasy 0-2, J O'Shea 0-1.

23 October 1976 First round	St Finbarr's College	4-08 - 1-08	Cashel CBS	Canon Hayes Park
	D Walsh 1-2, N Tobin 1-0, S O'Sullivan 1-0, J O'Donovan 1-0, D O'Shea 0-2, K Barry 0-2, P Tobin 0-1, D O'Donovan 0-1.		S Hickey 1-1, P Power 0-3, L Maher 0-1, S Delahunty 0-1, C Bonnar 0-1, M Corcoran 0-1.

=== Quarter-finals ===
13 October 1976 Quarter-final	Coláiste Iognáid Rís	3-09 - 3-05	Thurles CBS	St Ailbe's Park
	J Manning 1-1, F O'Mahony 1-1, B Collins 0-4, S Murphy 1-0, K O'Driscoll 0-1, P Creagh 0-1, T Lotty 0-1.		W Purcell 0-4, T Stakelum 1-0, J Finn 1-0, M Doyle 1-0, J Burke 0-1.

13 November 1976 Quarter-final	St Colman's College	4-09 - 0-05	Limerick CBS	St Ailbe's Park
	G O'Regan 1-4, J Boylan 1-1, J Mangan 1-0, J Monaghan 1-0, J Hartnett 0-3, T Murphy 0-1.		S Herbert 0-2, G Morgan 0-1, F Quilligan 0-1, M Molyneaux 0-1.

14 November 1976 Quarter-final	St Flannan's College	5-08 - 0-03	De La Salle College Waterford	Canon Hayes Park
	J Colleran 2-1, PJ Deasy 1-4, J Liddy 1-0, J Mullins 1-0, L Quinlan 0-2, C Lyons 0-1.		J Kirwan 0-1, J Long 0-1, T Hackett 0-1.

24 November 1976 Quarter-final	St Finbarr's College	2-08 - 3-05	Templemore CBS	St Ailbe's Park
	D Walsh 0-5, S O'Sullivan 1-0, P Tobin 1-0, K Barry 0-1, D O'Shea 0-1, D O'Donovan 0-1.		P McGrath 1-1, M Carey 1-0, M Walsh 1-0, E Doherty 0-2, P Maher 0-1, E Coady 0-1.

8 December 1976 Quarter-final replay	St Finbarr's College	3-08 - 1-09	Templemore CBS	St Ailbe's Park
	D Walsh 2-5, K Barry 1-1, D O'Shea 0-1, L Lynch 0-1.		P McGrath 0-5, M Murphy 1-0, E O'Doherty 0-2, E Coady 0-2.

=== Semi-finals ===
20 February 1977 Semi-final	St Flannan's College	4-14 - 2-04	St Finbarr's College	Canon Hayes Park
	L Quinlan 0-9, J McInerney 3-0, C Lyons 1-3, PJ Deasy 0-1, J Liddy 0-1.		K Barry 1-1, D O'Shea 1-0, P Jordan 0-1, M McAuliffe 0-1, D Walsh 0-1.

20 February 1977 Semi-final	St Colman's College	2-11 - 1-04	Coláiste Iognáid Rís	FitzGerald Park
	G O'Regan 1-7, J Boylan 1-1, M Mellerick 0-2, J Hartnett 0-1.		P Creagh 1-0, A Lotty 0-2, B Collins 0-1, T Mullins 0-1.

=== Final ===
13 March 1977 Final	St Colman's College	0-07 - 0-03	St Flannan's College	St Ailbe's Park
	G O'Regan 0-4, J Mangan 0-1, W Cashman 0-1, T Murphy 0-1.		PJ Deasy 0-2, J Hanley 0-1.

== Statistics ==
=== Top scorers ===
Rank	Player	County	Tally	Total	Matches	Average
1	Gerard O'Regan	St Colman's College	3-17	26	4	6.50
2	Denis Walsh	St Finbarr's College	3-13	22	4	5.50
3	John Boylan	St Colman's College	4-03	15	4	3.75
4	Jimmy Monaghan	St Colman's College	3-03	12	4	3.00
5	Kevin Barry	St Finbarr's College	2-05	11	4	2.75
5	Leo Quinlan	St Flannan's College	0-11	11	3	3.66
