= 1957–58 Harty Cup =

1957–58 Dr Harty Cup
- Champions: St Flannan's College (8th title)
- Runners-up: Limerick CBS

The 1957–58 Harty Cup was the 38th staging of the Harty Cup since its establishment by the Munster Colleges Council of the Gaelic Athletic Association in 1918.

St Flannan's College were the defending champions.

The final was played on 23 March 1958 at the Gaelic Grounds in Limerick, between St Flannan's College and Limerick CBS, in what was their second meeting overall in the final. St Flannan's College won the match by 6–02 to 3–07 to claim their eighth Harty Cup title overall and a second consecutive title.

== Knockout stage ==
=== Final ===
23 March 1958 Final	St Flannan's College	6-02 - 3-07	Limerick CBS	Gaelic Grounds
