= Fan Barry =

Irish hurler

Personal information
- Native name: Fan de Barra (Irish)

Sport
- Sport: Hurling
Club
- Years: Club
- St Mary's
Club titles
- Cork titles: 0
Inter-county*
Years	County	Apps (scores)
1919–1920	Cork	0 (0–0)
Inter-county titles
- Munster titles: 2
- All-Irelands: 1
- *Inter County team apps and scores correct as of 17:33, 7 April 2018.

Fan Barry was an Irish hurler. His championship career with the Cork senior team lasted from 1919 until 1920.

Barry made his debut with the Cork senior team during the 1919 championship and was a regular member of the panel for the following two years. During this time he won his sole All-Ireland SHC medal. Barry also won two Munster SHC medals.

== Honours ==
Cork

- All-Ireland Senior Hurling Championship (1): 1919
- Munster Senior Hurling Championship (2): 1919, 1920
