= 1975–76 Harty Cup =

Hurling tournament

1975–76 Dr Harty Cup
- Dates: 15 October 1975 – 4 April 1976
- Teams: 9
- Champions: St Flannan's College (9th title); Leo Quinlan (captain)
- Runners-up: De La Salle College

Tournament statistics
- Matches played: 9
- Goals scored: 34 (3.78 per match)
- Points scored: 133 (14.78 per match)
- Top scorer(s): John O'Sullivan (0-22)

The 1975–76 Harty Cup was the 56th staging of the Harty Cup since its establishment in hurling by the Munster Council of the Gaelic Athletic Association in 1918. The competition ran from 15 October 1975 to 4 April 1976.

Coláiste Iognáid Rís unsuccessfully defended their title.

St Flannan's College won in the Harty Cup final their 9th successive Harty Cup title overall, 2–09 to 3–04, since their first title in 1958, on 4 April 1976 at Canon Hayes Park in Bansha, against De La Salle College Waterford, in what was their first ever meeting in the final.

North Monastery's John O'Sullivan was the top scorer with 0-22.

== Results ==
=== First round ===
18 October 19 First round	North Monastery	3-13 - 5-04	Limerick CBS	Canon Hayes Park
	J O'Sullivan 0-10, P Horgan 1-1, E Hanley 1-0, L Murray 1-0, J Callaghan 0-1, J Deasy 0-1.		K Canty 1-4, D Tangney 2-0, K O'Brien 1-0, S Óg Herbert 1-0.

=== Quarter-finals ===
15 October 1975 Quarter-final	Coláiste Iognáid Rís	0-05 - 1-16	St Flannan's College	St Ailbe's Park
	P Crowley 0-3, B Collins 0-1, H Rodgers 0-1.		L Quinlan 0-5, C Lyons 1-1, M Meehan 0-3, J Murphy 0-2, PJ Deasy 0-2, B Donnellan 0-2, J Moran 0-1.

15 October 1975 Quarter-final	St Colman's College	5-05 - 1-03	St Finbarr's College	Clonmult Memorial Park
	M Barrett 3-1, J Burke 1-0, J Moynihan 1-0, J Boylan 0-3, D Murphy 0-1.		P Barry 1-0, D Sheehan 0-3.

30 October 1975 Quarter-final	De La Salle College Waterford	1-13 - 1-04	Thurles CBS	Clonmel GAA Ground
	G Kirwan 0-6, D Fitzpatrick 1-1, T Hackett 0-3, L Conran 0-2, D Kirwan 0-1.		T Mullins 1-1, M Doyle 0-1, B Dowd 0-1, B Coman 0-1.

6 December 1975 Quarter-final	North Monastery	1-17 - 1-04	Cashel CBS	Páirc Mac Gearailt
	J O'Sullivan 0-7, D Murphy 1-1, G O'Callaghan 0-3, P Murphy 0-2, H Ellard 0-2, T Deasy 0-2.		M Heffernan 1-1, T Grogan 0-1, M Corcoran 0-1, T Slattery 0-1.

=== Semi-finals ===
7 March 1976 Semi-final	St Flannan's College	2-06 - 0-06	North Monastery	St Ailbe's Park
	M Meehan 0-5, PJ Deasy 1-0, C Lyons 1-0, L Quinlan 0-1.		J O'Sullivan 0-5, P Horgan 0-1.

14 March 1976 Semi-final	De La Salle College Waterford	0-08 - 2-02	St Colman's College	Clonmel GAA Ground
	L Conran 0-3, G Kirwan 0-2, M Sherlock 0-1, D Fitzpatrick 0-1, B O'Keeffe 0-1.		B Joyce 2-1, J Monaghan 0-1.

21 March 1976 Semi-final replay	De La Salle College Waterford	3-09 - 3-05	St Colman's College	Clonmel GAA Ground
	D Fitzpatrick 2-0, G Kirwan 0-5, L Conran 0-3, K Brophy 0-1, T Hackett 0-1.		C Ahern 1-0, P Cronin 1-0, A O'Regan 1-0, J Boylan 0-3, J Hartnett 0-2.

=== Final ===
4 April 1976 Final	St Flannan's College	2-09 - 3-04	De La Salle College Waterford	Canon Hayes Park
	B Donnellan 1-3, J Murphy 1-0, M Meehan 0-2, L Quinlan 0-2, PJ Deasy 0-1, J Colleran 0-1.		D Fitzpatrick 2-2, G Kirwan 1-0, L Conran 0-1, K Brophy 0-1.

== Statistics ==
=== Top scorers ===
Rank	Player	County	Tally	Total	Matches	Average
1	John O'Sullivan	North Monastery	0-22	22	3	7.33
2	Donal Fitzpatrick	De La Salle College	5-04	19	4	4.75
3	Gerry Kirwan	De La Salle College	1-13	16	4	4.00
4	Moss Barrett	St Colman's College	3-01	10	2	5.00
4	Martin Meehan	St Flannan's College	0-10	10	4	2.50
