= Éamonn Fitzpatrick =

Irish hurler and Gaelic footballer (1951–2024)

Personal information
- Native name: Éamonn Mac Giolla Pádraig (Irish)
- Nickname: Fitzy
- Born: 1951 Togher, Cork, Ireland
- Died: 11 August 2024 (aged 73) Togher, Cork, Ireland
- Occupation: Postman

Sport
- Sport: Hurling
- Position: Left wing-forward
Clubs
- Years: Club
- 1969–1989 1970–1972: St Finbarr's → University College Cork
Club titles
	Football	Hurling
Cork titles	2	8
Munster titles	0	3
All-Ireland titles	0	2
College
- Years: College
- 1969-1972: University College Cork
College titles
- Fitzgibbon titles: 2
Inter-county
Years	County	Apps (scores)
1972–1975	Cork	0 (0-00)
Inter-county titles
- Munster titles: 0
- All-Irelands: 0
- NHL: 0
- All Stars: 0

Éamonn Fitzpatrick (1951 – 11 August 2024) was an Irish hurler and coach. At club level he played with St Finbarr's and University College Cork and was also a member of the Cork senior hurling teams on a number of occasions.

== Career ==
Born in Cork, Fitzpatrick first came to prominence at colleges level with Coláiste Chríost Rí. After winning provincial colleges titles in both codes in 1968, he subsequently won a Hogan Cup title. Fitzpatrick simultaneously made his first appearances on the club scene, winning a Cork MFC title with St Finbarr's in 1968, before progressing to adult level as a dual player.

The "college rule" resulted in Fitzpatrick transferring to University College Cork in 1970. He won a Cork SHC medal as a panel member in his first season, however, he missed the final as he was recuperating after operations for appendicitis and a pelvic abscess. He also won consecutive Fitzgibbon Cup medals during his time with college.

On resuming his club career with St Finbarr's, Fitzpatrick won an All-Ireland Club SHC medal in 1975. He claimed a second All-Ireland winners' medal in 1978. Fitzpatrick's other St. Finbarr's honours include three Munster Club SHC medals and a club record of seven Cork SHC medals. He also won a Cork SFC medal in 1976.

Fitzpatrick first appeared on the inter-county scene as a member of the Cork minor football team that beat Derry in the 1969 All-Ireland minor final. He later became a dual player at under-21 level, winning consecutive All-Ireland U21FC medals in 1970 and 1971, as well as an All-Ireland U21HC medal in 1971. Fitzpatrick made a number of National Hurling League appearances for the senior team.

== Coaching career ==
In retirement from playing, Fitzpatrick remained involved with St Finbarr's as a coach at all levels. He was assistant coach, under Charlie McCarthy, when the club's senior team beat Carbery in the 1993 final.

== Death ==
Fitzpatrick died on 11 August 2024, at the age of 73.

== Honours ==
=== Player ===
Coláiste Chríost Rí

- Hogan Cup: 1968
- Dr Harty Cup: 1968
- Corn Uí Mhuirí: 1968
- Dr O'Callaghan Cup: 1968, 1969
- Dr Browne Cup: 1968 (c)

University College Cork

- Fitzgibbon Cup: 1971, 1972
- Cork Senior Hurling Championship: 1970

St Finbarr's

- All-Ireland Senior Club Hurling Championship: 1975, 1978
- Munster Senior Club Hurling Championship: 1975, 1978, 1980
- Cork Senior Football Championship: 1976
- Cork Senior Hurling Championship: 1974, 1977, 1980, 1981, 1982, 1984, 1988
- Cork Minor Football Championship: 1968

Cork

- All-Ireland Under-21 Hurling Championship: 1971
- All-Ireland Under-21 Football Championship: 1970, 1971
- Munster Under-21 Hurling Championship: 1971
- Munster Under-21 Football Championship: 1970, 1971
- All-Ireland Minor Football Championship: 1969
- Munster Minor Football Championship: 1969

=== Management ===
St Finbarr's

- Cork Senior Hurling Championship: 1993
