= David Stanton (politician) =

Irish former politician (born 1957)

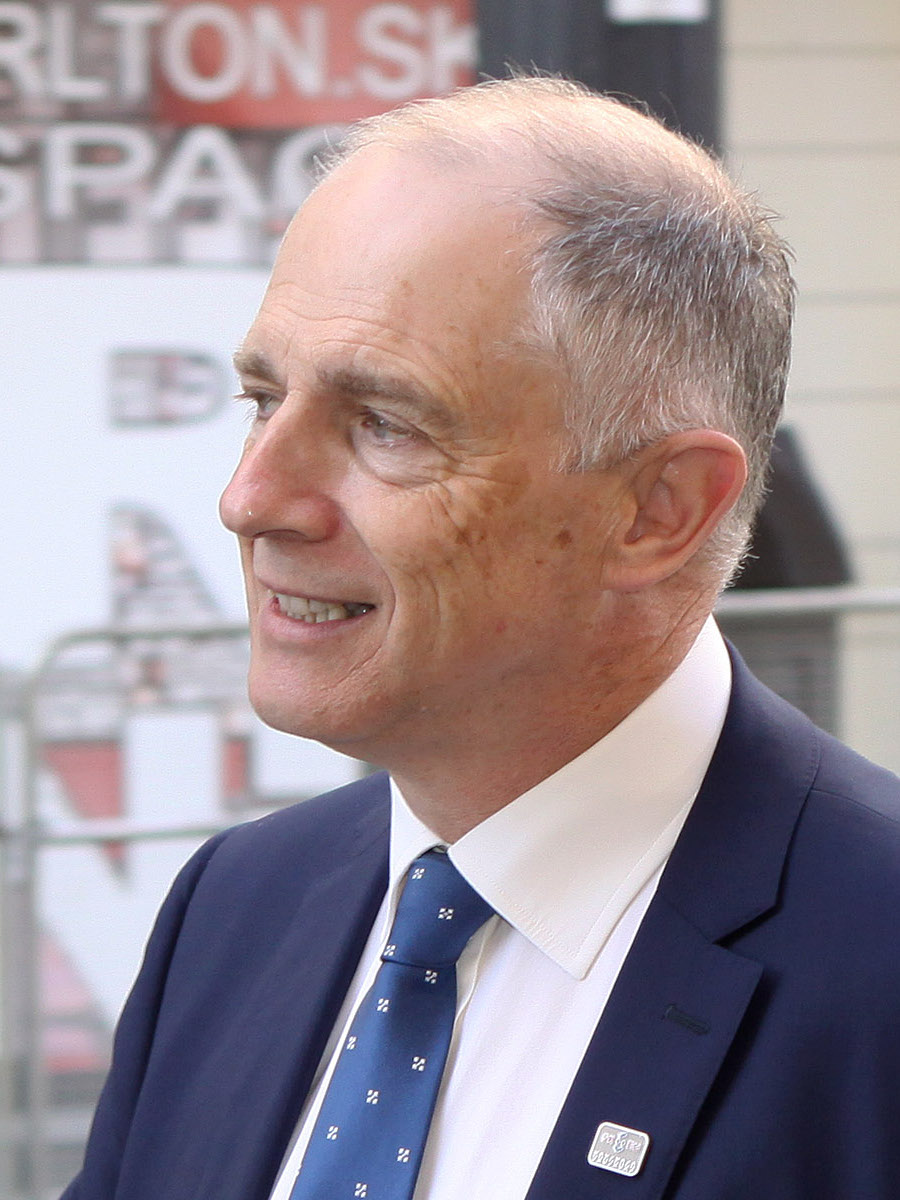
- Stanton in 2016

Minister of State
- 2016–2020: Justice and Equality

Teachta Dála
- In office June 1997 – November 2024
- Constituency: Cork East

Personal details
- Born: 15 February 1957 (age 69) Midleton, County Cork, Ireland
- Party: Fine Gael
- Spouse: Mary Lehane (m. 1990)
- Children: 4
- Education: University College Cork
- Website: stanton.ie

Military service
- Allegiance: Ireland
- Branch/service: Army Reserve
- Years of service: 1980–1996
- Rank: Officer

David Stanton (born 15 February 1957) is an Irish former Fine Gael politician who served as a Teachta Dála (TD) for the Cork East constituency from 1997 to 2024. He served as a Minister of State from 2016 to 2020.

== Early life ==
Stanton was born in County Cork. He was educated at St. Colman's Vocational School, Midleton; Sharman Crawford Technical Institute, Cork and University College Cork where he received a Bachelor of Arts degree in Sociology and Mathematics. Before entering politics, he was a woodwork and technical drawing teacher and a career guidance counsellor in St Colman's Community College in Midleton. Stanton served in the Reserve Defence Forces (RDF) as an officer in the Army Reserve. He is married to Mary Lehane and they have four sons.

== Political career ==
Stanton was first elected to Dáil Éireann at the 1997 general election and has been re-elected at every general election since. He was party spokesperson on Social and Family Affairs, and Equality from 2004 to 2007. Prior to this he acted as deputy spokesperson on Education and Science, and spokesperson on Labour Affairs, Consumer Rights and Trade from 1997 to 2002. From 2007 to 2010, he was party Assistant Chief Whip (Dáil Reform) with special responsibility for Disability Issues. In July 2010, he was appointed spokesperson on Defence.

On 19 May 2016, Stanton was appointed by the Fine Gael–Independent government on the nomination of Taoiseach Enda Kenny as Minister of State at the Department of Justice and Equality with special responsibility for Equality, Immigration, and Integration. On 20 June 2017, he was appointed by the government formed by Leo Varadkar to the same position.

In this role, Stanton formally announced the State's intention, following Government approval, to establish an Irish gambling regulatory under the auspices of the Department of Justice. Speaking as then Minister of State with special responsibility for gambling regulation, Stanton said, "A modern and effectively regulated gambling environment will ensure, to the greatest extent possible, that gambling will be a safe, fair and entertaining activity for the majority of those who choose to take part in it. We must ensure that it will provide enhanced consumer protection for players while limiting to the greatest extent possible the harmful effects on young people and those who may be susceptible to addiction."

During his time in the Department of Justice, Stanton played a key role in the creation of the Domestic Violence Act 2018. The act provided many law changes including for new criminal offences in relation to coercive control and forced marriage. Former Minister for Justice Charlie Flanagan thanked Stanton for his work on this matter stating, "Minister Stanton successfully brought the Bill through Committee and Report Stages in the Upper House, during which many important amendments were made."

At the 2020 general election, Stanton was re-elected in the Cork East constituency.

On 23 May 2023, he announced that he would not contest the next general election.

Dáil	Election	Deputy (Party)	Deputy (Party)	Deputy (Party)	Deputy (Party)	Deputy (Party)
4th	1923	John Daly (Ind.)	Michael Hennessy (CnaG)	David Kent (Rep)	John Dinneen (FP)	Thomas O'Mahony (CnaG)
4th	1924 by-election	John Daly (Ind.)	Michael Hennessy (CnaG)	David Kent (Rep)	John Dinneen (FP)	Michael K. Noonan (CnaG)
5th	1927 (Jun)	John Daly (Ind.)	Michael Hennessy (CnaG)	David Kent (SF)	David O'Gorman (FP)	Martin Corry (FF)
6th	1927 (Sep)	John Daly (CnaG)	Michael Hennessy (CnaG)	William Kent (FF)	Edmond Carey (CnaG)	Martin Corry (FF)
7th	1932	John Daly (CnaG)	William Broderick (CnaG)	Brook Brasier (Ind.)	Patrick Murphy (FF)	Martin Corry (FF)
8th	1933	Patrick Daly (CnaG)	William Broderick (CnaG)	William Kent (NCP)	Patrick Murphy (FF)	Martin Corry (FF)
9th	1937	Constituency abolished				

Dáil	Election	Deputy (Party)	Deputy (Party)	Deputy (Party)
13th	1948	Martin Corry (FF)	Patrick O'Gorman (FG)	Seán Keane (Lab)
14th	1951	Martin Corry (FF)	Patrick O'Gorman (FG)	Seán Keane (Lab)
14th	1953 by-election	Martin Corry (FF)	Patrick O'Gorman (FG)	Richard Barry (FG)
15th	1954	Martin Corry (FF)	John Moher (FF)	Richard Barry (FG)
16th	1957	Martin Corry (FF)	John Moher (FF)	Richard Barry (FG)
17th	1961	Constituency abolished		

Dáil	Election	Deputy (Party)	Deputy (Party)	Deputy (Party)	Deputy (Party)
22nd	1981	Carey Joyce (FF)	Myra Barry (FG)	Patrick Hegarty (FG)	Joe Sherlock (SF–WP)
23rd	1982 (Feb)	Michael Ahern (FF)	Myra Barry (FG)	Patrick Hegarty (FG)	Joe Sherlock (SF–WP)
24th	1982 (Nov)	Michael Ahern (FF)	Myra Barry (FG)	Patrick Hegarty (FG)	Ned O'Keeffe (FF)
25th	1987	Michael Ahern (FF)	Joe Sherlock (WP)	Patrick Hegarty (FG)	Ned O'Keeffe (FF)
26th	1989	Michael Ahern (FF)	Joe Sherlock (WP)	Paul Bradford (FG)	Ned O'Keeffe (FF)
27th	1992	Michael Ahern (FF)	John Mulvihill (Lab)	Paul Bradford (FG)	Ned O'Keeffe (FF)
28th	1997	Michael Ahern (FF)	David Stanton (FG)	Paul Bradford (FG)	Ned O'Keeffe (FF)
29th	2002	Michael Ahern (FF)	David Stanton (FG)	Joe Sherlock (Lab)	Ned O'Keeffe (FF)
30th	2007	Michael Ahern (FF)	David Stanton (FG)	Seán Sherlock (Lab)	Ned O'Keeffe (FF)
31st	2011	Sandra McLellan (SF)	David Stanton (FG)	Seán Sherlock (Lab)	Tom Barry (FG)
32nd	2016	Pat Buckley (SF)	David Stanton (FG)	Seán Sherlock (Lab)	Kevin O'Keeffe (FF)
33rd	2020	Pat Buckley (SF)	David Stanton (FG)	Seán Sherlock (Lab)	James O'Connor (FF)
34th	2024	Pat Buckley (SF)	Noel McCarthy (FG)	Liam Quaide (SD)	James O'Connor (FF)
