= Paddy O'Halloran =

Irish hurler and Gaelic footballer

Personal information
- Born: Shanbally, County Cork

Sport
- Football Position: Corner-back
- Hurling Position: Corner-back
Club
- Years: Club
- 1910s-1920s: St Mary's
Inter-county
- Years: County
- 1910s 1910s-1920s: Cork (F); Cork (H)
Inter-county titles
	Football	Hurling
Munster Titles	0	3
All-Ireland Titles	0	1

Paddy O'Halloran was an Irish sportsperson. He played hurling and Gaelic football with his local club St Mary's and was a dual player with the Cork senior inter-county teams in the 1910s and 1920s.

== Playing career ==
=== Club ===
O'Halloran played his club hurling and football with his local club called St Mary's club. He enjoyed little in the way of major success with the club.

=== Inter-county ===
O'Halloran first came to prominence on the inter-county scene as a member of the Cork senior hurling team in 1915. That year he won his first Munster winners' medal following a victory over Clare in the provincial final. The subsequent All-Ireland final pitted Cork against Laois. It was their first ever meeting in the history of the championship, with Cork going into the game as the red-hot favourites. Cork led by 3-0 to 2-2 at half-time, however, a huge downpour stymied their style of play. With nine minutes left in the game John Carroll scored the winning goal for Laois. It was the second time that O'Halloran had ended up on the losing side on All-Ireland final day.

After a period in the wilderness Cork bounced back in 1919 with O'Halloran collecting a third Munster winners' medal following a provincial final defeat of Limerick. The All-Ireland final saw Cork line out against Dublin. 'The Rebels' were coasting at half-time with Kennedy having scored four goals. He had two more disallowed to give his side a 4-2 to 1-1 lead. Cork ploughed on in the second-half to secure a 6-4 to 2-4 victory. This victory gave O'Halloran an All-Ireland winners' medal. This was also the first occasion that Cork wore their distinctive red jerseys. The old saffron and blue jerseys had been seized by the British before the game so alternative arrangements had to be made.

In 1920 O'Halloran won a fourth and final Munster title following another victory over Limerick. A third All-Ireland final appearance beckoned, however, Cork failed to retain their title. A goal blitz by Joe Phelan, Jimmy Walsh and Mick Neville gave Dublin a 4-9 to 4-3 victory. This defeat brought O'Halloran's inter-county career to an end.
