= Charlie Vernon =

Armagh Gaelic footballer

Personal information
- Native name: Cathal de Bhearnúin (Irish)
- Born: 25 December 1986 (age 39) Armagh, Northern Ireland
- Occupation: Accountant
- Height: 1.85 m (6 ft 1 in)

Sport
- Sport: Gaelic Football
- Position: Midfield/full back
Club
- Years: Club
- 2004 - 2022: Armagh Harps
Club titles
- Armagh titles: 1
- Ulster titles: 0
- All-Ireland Titles: 0
College
Years	College	Apps (scores)
	Queen's University Belfast	0-12
College titles
- Sigerson titles: 1
Inter-county
- Years: County
- 2005-2019: Armagh
Inter-county titles
- Ulster titles: 2
- NFL: 0
- All Stars: 0
All-Ireland Titles	0	

Charlie Vernon is an Irish Gaelic footballer who plays for the Armagh county team, and joint head of the Loch An Iuir PE Department. He captained the Under-21 team in the 2007 season. He has a Sigerson Cup Runners Up and winners medal during his time as a player on the Queen's University Team losing in 2006 to DCU in Parnell Park and winning in 2007 at QUB playing fields, The Dub. He made his Championship debut on 15 June 2008 against Cavan, scoring a point. Armagh was without his services for the start of the 2009 Ulster SFC opener because he suffered broken jaw against Dublin. Charlie retired from Armagh in 2019.

== Peil Star Street Gaelic Football ==
In 2017, Vernon appeared in a Street Gaelic Football film Peil's Poc, created by Peil Star with Michael Murphy from Donegal.

The film was shot in Omagh, County Tyrone for the BBC.

== Honours ==
- Ulster Senior Football Championship (2): 2006, 2008
- Ulster Under-21 Football Championship (1): 2007 (C)
- Sigerson Cup (1): 2007
- Ulster Minor Football Championship (1): 2005
- Armagh Under-21 Football Championship(1): 2005
- Armagh Minor Football Championship (1) 2003
- Ulster Minor Club Football Championship (1) 2003
- Armagh Senior Football Championship: 1 (2017)
- O'fiach Cup (1) 2016
- Armagh Senior Division 1A League Title (1) 2022
