= Des O'Grady =

Irish Gaelic footballer and county councillor (1952–2025)

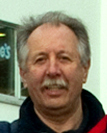
- O'Grady in 2012

Personal information
- Native name: Deasún Ó Gráda (Irish)
- Nickname: Dessie
- Born: 1952 Togher, Cork, Ireland
- Died: 8 January 2025 (aged 72) Wilton, Cork, Ireland
- Occupations: Teacher, county councillor
- Height: 5 ft 11 in (180 cm)

Sport
- Sport: Gaelic football
- Position: Left wing-back
Club
- Years: Club
- St Finbarr's
Club titles
- Cork titles: 3
- Munster titles: 2
- All-Ireland Titles: 1
Inter-county*
Years	County	Apps (scores)
1977	Cork	2 (0-00)
Inter-county titles
- Munster titles: 0
- All-Irelands: 0
- NFL: 0
- All Stars: 0
- *Inter County team apps and scores correct as of 20:23, 18 July 2014.

James Desmond O'Grady (1952 – 8 January 2025) was an Irish Gaelic footballer who played as a left wing-back at senior level for the Cork county team.

== Career ==
Born in Togher, Cork, O'Grady first played competitive football during his youth. He made his senior debut during the 1977 championship. O'Grady was a regular member of the team for just one season. He was a Munster runner-up on one occasion.

At club level O'Grady is a one-time All-Ireland medallist with St Finbarr's. In addition to this he also won two Munster medals and three championship medals.

His brother, Dónal, was an All-Ireland medallist as a player and as a manager with the Cork senior hurling team.

== Political career ==
In 2014, O'Grady was elected to Cork County Council (Blarney–Macroom area) as a Sinn Féin party member.

== Death ==
O'Grady died at Cork University Hospital on 8 January 2025, at the age of 72.

== Honours ==
North Monastery

- Dr Croke Cup: 1970 (c)
- Dr Harty Cup: 1970 (c)

St Finbarr's

- All-Ireland Senior Club Football Championship (1): 1981
- Munster Senior Club Football Championship (2): 1979, 1980
- Cork Senior Football Championship (3): 1976, 1979, 1980
