= 1974–75 Harty Cup =

Hurling tournament

1974–75 Dr Harty Cup
- Dates: 23 October 1974 – 16 March 1975
- Teams: 10
- Champions: Coláiste Iognáid Rís (1st title); Terry Howard (captain)
- Runners-up: Limerick CBS; John O'Brien (captain)

Tournament statistics
- Matches played: 10
- Goals scored: 44 (4.4 per match)
- Points scored: 120 (12 per match)
- Top scorer(s): Paul Crowley (1-15)

The 1974–75 Harty Cup was the 55th staging of the Harty Cup since its establishment in hurling by the Munster Council of the Gaelic Athletic Association in 1918. The competition ran from 23 October 1974 to 16 March 1975.

St Finbarr's College unsuccessfully defended its title, in an attempt for an unrealised record-breaking fifth successive title.

Coláiste Iognáid Rís won their first ever Harty Cup title overall in the Harty Cup final, 5–06 to 2–04, on 16 March 1975 at Semple Stadium in Thurles, against Limerick CBS, in their first meeting in the final.

== Results ==
=== First round ===
23 October 1974 First round	St Finbarr's College	3-07 - 4-11	Thurles CBS	FitzGerald Park
	K O'Driscoll 2-4, F Tobin 1-3.		D Healy 2-1, T Doran 0-6, D Bourke 1-1, J Guihan 1-0, S Fennessy 0-2, K Dunne 0-1.

29 January 1975 First round	Coláiste Iognáid Rís	1-06 - 2-02	Templemore CBS	St Ailbe's Park
	P Crowley 0-4, J Murphy 1-0, T Cullinane 0-2.		S Bourke 2-2.

=== Quarter-finals ===
23 October 1974 Quarter-final	St Colman's College	3-10 - 4-03	St Munchin's College	St Ailbe's Park
	J Hayes 1-2, J O'Brien 0-5, T O'Brien 1-0, D Kelleher 1-0, M Cronin 0-1, G Baker 0-1, S Taylor 0-1.

17 November 1974 Quarter-final	Limerick CBS	4-06 - 3-05	North Monastery	Fr Con Buckley Park
	K Canty 2-3, D Punch 1-0, B Skelly 1-0, D Brougham 0-2, R Browne 0-1.		P Horgan 3-3, J O'Sullivan 0-2.

17 November 1974 Quarter-final	De La Salle College Waterford	1-05 - 1-05	St Flannan's College	Leahy Park
	Del Kirwan 1-1, G Kirwan 0-2, B Rackard 0-2.		B Donnellan 1-0, D Hassett 0-2, P Hassett 0-1, A Power 0-1, M Meehan 0-1.

2 February 1975 Quarter-final replay	De La Salle College Waterford	3-06 - 2-07	St Flannan's College	Canon Hayes Park
			D Hassett 1-3, M Ryan 1-0, A Power 0-2, B Donnellan 0-1, J Casey 0-1.

7 February 1975 Quarter-final	Coláiste Iognáid Rís	1-12 - 0-07	Thurles CBS	St Ailbe's Park
	B Collins 1-1, P Crowley 0-4, T Beckett 0-2, J Murphy 0-1, J Barry 0-1, T Cullinane 0-1, T Howard 0-1, L O'Sullivan 0-1.		T Doran 0-5, M Doyle 0-1, B Dowd 0-1.

=== Semi-finals ===
15 February 1975 Semi-final	Coláiste Iognáid Rís	1-07 - 2-00	De La Salle College Waterford	Fraher Field
	P Crowley 1-4, T Cullinane 0-2, T Howard 0-1.		S Murphy 1-0, D Kirwan 1-0.

16 February 1975 Semi-final	Limerick CBS	1-06 - 1-05	St Colman's College	St Ailbe's Park
	G Hickey 1-0, D Brougham 0-3, K Canty 0-2, B Skelly 0-1.		G Hayes 1-0, J O'Brien 0-2, M Cronin 0-1, T O'Brien 0-1, D Kelleher 0-1.

=== Final ===
16 March 1975 Final	Coláiste Iognáid Rís	5-06 - 2-04	Limerick CBS	Semple Stadium
	J Murphy 3-1, T Howard 2-0, P Crowley 0-3, J Barry 0-2.		K Canty 1-1, F Kelly 1-0, M Costelloe 0-1, R Browne 0-1, J Mann 0-1.
