= Seó Spóirt =

Irish language television Gaelic sports talk show

- Seó Spóirt logo
- Developed by: Sónta
- Starring: Presenters: Dara Ó Cinnéide; Seán Bán Breathnach; Reporters: Gemma Ní Chionnaith; Analysts: Darragh Ó Sé; Coman Goggins; Liam Rushe; Aodán Mac Gearailt; Pat Fleury; Páidí Ó Sé; Ger Loughnane; Kevin Cassidy; Dónal O'Grady; Ger Loughnane; Tomás Ó Flatharta; John Allen; Ray Silke; Paul Galvin; Charlie Vernon; Micheál Ó Muircheartaigh; Mac Dara Mac Donncha
- Country of origin: Ireland
- Original language: Irish

Production
- Production locations: Baile na hAbhann, Galway
- Running time: 40 minutes

Original release
- Network: TG4
- Release: February 2, 2007 – present

Seó Spóirt is an Irish language sports talk-show that is broadcast weekly on Friday evenings on TG4. Focusing on GAA and rugby union, the show runs each year from spring to autumn, covering the main competitions in both codes.

Seó Spóirt is presented by former Kerry footballer Dara Ó Cinnéide, along with regular guest Seán Bán Breathnach.

The show usually consists of a discussion of recent action and events from the worlds of GAA and rugby, with comment and analysis from different guests each week. Among the regular guests are Darragh Ó Sé, Coman Goggins, Liam Rushe, Pat Fleury, Páidí Ó Sé, Ger Loughnane, Kevin Cassidy, Dónal O'Grady, Ger Loughnane, Aodán Mac Gearailt, Tomás Ó Flatharta, John Allen, Ray Silke, Paul Galvin, Charlie Vernon and Micheál Ó Muircheartaigh.

The show also includes interviews with players and managers, and other reports by Gemma Ní Chionnaith.

Another regular feature is "Thar an Trasnán" ("Over the Bar") competition, in which school-level football and hurling teams compete to see who can put the ball over the bar the most times.

Seó Spóirt first went on air on February 2, 2007. Mícheál Ó Dómhnaill hosted the first series, before making way for Dara Ó Cinnéide in 2009.

== Seasons ==
- Series 1: February 2, 2007
- Series 2: 2008
- Series 3: January 30, 2009
- Series 4: February 5, 2010
- Series 5: February 4, 2011
- Series 6: February 3, 2012
