= 2006–07 Harty Cup =

2006–07 Dr Harty Cup
- Dates: September 2006 – 12 March 2007
- Champions: De La Salle College (1st title); Craig Moloney (captain); David O’Sullivan (captain)
- Runners-up: St Flannan's College

The 2006–07 Harty Cup was the 87th staging of the Harty Cup since its establishment in hurling by the Munster Council of Gaelic Athletic Association in 1918.

Midleton CBS were the defending champions.

The final was played on 11 March 2007 at Leahy Park in Cashel, between De La Salle College Waterford and St Flannan's College, in what was their first ever meeting in the final. De La Salle College won the match by 2–09 to 0–11 to claim their first ever Harty Cup title.

== Knockout stage ==
=== Final ===
11 March 2007 Final	De La Salle College	2-09 - 0-11	St Flannan's College	Leahy Park
	S Power 2-9.	Report	J Conlon 0-8, K Heagney 0-2, D Stack 0-1.
