= St Colman's Community College =

Location
- Midleton, County Cork; Ireland
- Coordinates: 51.9103°N 8.1676°W

Information
- Principal: Máirín Lally
- Enrollment: 1011 (2024)
- Website: https://www.colmans.ie

St Colman's Community College is a second-level school located in Midleton, County Cork, Ireland.

As of 2024, there were over 1000 students in St Colman's Community College. The school's facilities include general classrooms, a music room, five woodwork and three engineering rooms, three technical graphics rooms, four home economics kitchens, eight science rooms, three computer rooms, two art rooms and a "Learning Hub". The sports facilities include two sports halls, basketball courts, and a GAA pitch. The school participates in projects such as Sci-Fest, PsychSlam, Model UN Green Schools, Clean Coasts, An Gaisce Award and The Amber Group.

The principal is Máirín Lally. The school is a member of Cork Education Training Board CETB.

== History ==
St Colman's Community College was originally established in Connolly Street, Midleton in 1953, and remained in that location for thirty years. In 1980, St Colman's moved to a purpose-built complex on landscaped grounds on the Youghal Road. This move coincided with increasing participation in second-level education in Ireland and as numbers grew further accommodation was required. In 1988, a large extension was added which included a PE hall, new science laboratories, technology rooms, additional facilities for home economics and a number of additional classrooms.

In January 2020, a further large extension to the school was opened, consisting of 15 general classrooms, a music room, a home economics room, 3 computer rooms, 2 computer drawing rooms, 2 art rooms, a language room, a "Learning Hub", an engineering block and a sports hall. An additional extension was opened in January 2024.

== Curriculum ==
The school offers both the Junior and Senior cycles. Junior Cycle students can follow either the Junior Cycle, Junior Cert Schools programme, or Junior Cert Level 2. Senior Cycle students can follow the Leaving Certificate, Leaving Certificate Vocational or Leaving Certificate Applied programmes.

== Alumni ==
- David Stanton (b. 1957) - Fine Gael politician
