= 1956–57 Harty Cup =

1956–57 Dr Harty Cup
- Champions: St Flannan's College (7th title)
- Runners-up: North Monastery

The 1956–57 Harty Cup was the 37th staging of the Harty Cup since its establishment by the Munster Colleges Council of the Gaelic Athletic Association in 1918.

Thurles CBS were the defending champions.

The final was played on 24 March 1957 at Thurles Sportsfield, between St Flannan's College and North Monastery, in what was their third meeting overall in the final. St Flannan's College won the match by 7–07 to 3–03 to claim their seventh Harty Cup title overall and a first title in three years.

== Knockout stage ==
=== Final ===
24 March 1957 Final	St Flannan's College	7-07 - 3-03	North Monastery	Thurles Sportsfield
	J Devlin 3-0, P Nealon 2-2, O Naughton 1-0, F Custy 1-0, P Kennedy 0-2, T Ryan 0-2, B Hennessy 0-1.		T O'Sullivan 2-1, T Walsh 1-0, D O'Connor 0-1, W Carroll 0-1.
