= John Allen (hurler) =

Irish hurler and Gaelic footballer

Personal information
- Native name: Seán Ó hAilín (Irish)
- Born: 1955 (age 70–71) Aghabullogue, County Cork, Ireland
- Occupation: Retired primary school principal
- Height: 6 ft 1 in (185 cm)

Sport
- Football Position: Forward
- Hurling Position: Forward
Clubs
- Years: Club
- 1973–1976 1974–1976 1977–1990: Aghabullogue → Muskerry; St Finbarr's
Club titles
	Football	Hurling
Cork titles	4	5
Munster titles	4	1
All-Ireland titles	3	1
College
- Years: College
- Marino Institute of Education
Inter-county*
Years	County	Apps (scores)
1980–1984 1976–1978	Cork (F); Cork (H)	9 (2–6); 3 (0–1)
Inter-county titles
	Football	Hurling
Munster Titles	1	2
All-Ireland Titles	0	2
League titles	1	0
All-Stars	0	0
- *Inter County team apps and scores correct as of 18:33, 13 October 2012.

John Allen (born 1955) is an Irish former hurler and Gaelic footballer who played as a forward in both codes for the Cork senior teams.

A dual player at the highest level, Allen spent three season with the Cork senior hurling team. During that time he won one All-Ireland winners' medal and one Munster winners' medal. Allen also spent five seasons with the Cork senior football team, during which time he won one Munster winners' medal and one National Football League winners' medal.

At club level Allen is a dual All-Ireland medalist with St Finbarr's, while he also collected several provincial and club championship winners' medals in both codes.

In retirement from playing Allen turned his hand to coaching and team management. A successful few years as masseuse and selector with the Cork senior hurling team led to the beginning of a two-year tenure as team manager. From 2011 until 2013, Allen was the manager of the Limerick senior hurling team.

== Playing career ==
=== Club ===
Allen experienced a hugely successful club career with the St Finbarr's club.

He was just out of the under-21 grade when Allen won his first county football championship medal. A 1–10 to 1–7 defeat of St Michael's in 1976 secured "the Barr's" first championship since 1959.

In 1977 Allen won his first county hurling championship medal following a 1–17 to 1–5 trouncing of reigning All-Ireland champions Glen Rovers. He later added a Munster medal to his collection following a victory over Sixmilebridge in a replay of the final. Rathnure from Wexford provided the opposition in the subsequent All-Ireland decider, however, a 2–7 to 0–9 score line gave "the Barr's" the title. It was Allen's first All-Ireland medal.

Two years later Allen secured a second county football championship medal. He later won his first Munster medal following a 0–10 to 0–4 defeat of Kilrush Shamrocks. A 3–9 to 0–8 defeat of St. Grellan's gave Allen an All-Ireland medal.

In 1980 he won his second county hurling and third county football championship medals following defeats of Glen Rovers and UCC. It was the first of three successive hurling championships for the club. After missing the Munster hurling decider, Allen was back on the team for the 1981 All-Ireland final against Ballyhale Shamrocks. A 1–15 to 1–11 defeat followed for St. Finbarr's. In spite of missing the provincial hurling showpiece, Allen secured another Munster club football medal. A 1–8 to 0–6 defeat of Walterstown gave Allen a second successive All-Ireland football medal.

After surrendering their titles in 1981, St. Finbarr's returned the following year with Allen winning a fourth county football championship medal. This was later converted into a third Munster football medal.

Allen won a fifth and final county hurling championship medal in 1984.

The following year he won his fifth county football championship following a 1–10 to 0–9 defeat of Clonakilty.

A fourth Munster medal was secured by Allen in 1986 as the club represented the county in the provincial series. A three-point defeat of Clann na nGael gave Allen his third All-Ireland medal. This win effectively brought the curtain down on his club career.

=== Inter-county ===
Allen first came to prominence on the inter-county scene as a member of the Cork minor football team in 1973. He won a Munster medal that year following a 1–13 to 3–5 defeat of Kerry.

By 1976 Allen had joined the Cork under-21 hurling team. He collected a Munster medal in this grade that year as Clare were accounted for. He also won an all Ireland medal defeating Kilkenny in the final

By this stage Allen had already joined the Cork senior hurling team. He came on as a substitute to win a Munster medal following a 3–15 to 4–5 trouncing of Limerick in 1976. Cork later went on to claim the All-Ireland title, however, Allen was an unused substitute in that game.

Cork retained both their Munster and All-Ireland crowns in 1977 with Allen remaining as a member of the extended panel.

In 1978 Cork, having secured the provincial crown for a fourth successive year, played Kilkenny in the All-Ireland decider. Allen came on as a substitute in that game as "the Rebels" claimed a third championship in-a-row following a 1–15 to 2–8 victory. It was Allen's first All-Ireland medal won on the field of play.

Two years later in 1980 Allen had joined the Cork senior football team. He won a National League medal that year as Cork trounced Galway by 1–16 to 1–6.

After losing eight successive Munster football finals to Kerry between 1975 and 1982, Cork fought back in 1983. Allen was at full-forward that year as "the Rebels" claimed the Munster title following a one-point win.

== Managerial career ==
John Allen
Sport
Inter-county management
- Years: Team
- 2004–2006 2011–2013: Cork; Limerick
Inter-county titles as manager
County	League	Province	All-Ireland
Cork Limerick	1; 0	2; 1	2; 1

=== Beginnings ===
In retirement from playing Allen became involved in coaching various teams at all levels. At club level he took charge of the Sts Finbarr's senior football and camogie teams and Fr. O'Neill's junior hurling team.

From 1999 until 2001 Allen served as masseur with the Cork senior hurling team. During that period the team collected two Munster titles, as well as an All-Ireland title. He opted out for a year in 2002 but returned as a selector in 2003. That year Cork won the Munster title again, however, they lost out to Kilkenny in the All-Ireland final. The following year Allen was still a selector when Cork lost their Munster crown but won the All-Ireland title following a victory over Kilkenny.

=== Cork ===
In late October 2004 Allen succeeded Dónal O'Grady as the Cork manager for a two-year term and was immediately charged with the task of guiding the team to a second consecutive All-Ireland title for the 2005 Championship.

Allen's appointment as manager brought a level of continuity to the Cork senior hurling set-up. Very little changed with regard to the backroom team and the team virtually picked itself for every match. With Allen at the helm Cork reclaimed their second Munster title in three years with an exciting victory over Tipperary. The subsequent All-Ireland championship decider saw Cork take on Galway, winners of a thrilling semi-final with Kilkenny. Cork defeated Galway on a score line of 1–21 to 1–16. It was Cork's second championship title in-a-row and Allen's first as manager.

In 2006 Cork launched an all-out assault on capturing a third consecutive All-Ireland title. Allen's side got off to a good start by retaining their Munster title following a win over Tipperary. Further victories saw Cork reach a fourth successive championship decider. Kilkenny, Cork's archrivals, provided the opposition once again. It was a repeat of 2004 when Kilkenny were going for three wins in-a-row, however, Cork stopped them. On this occasion the tables were turned as Kilkenny halted Cork's bid for a three in-a-row, defeating them by 1–16 to 1–13. Shortly after his first defeat in ten championship games Allen announced, after much speculation, that he was not seeking another term as Cork manager.

=== Limerick ===
After a five-year absence from the inter-county scene, Allen was confirmed as the new Limerick senior hurling manager on 11 October 2011 on a two-year contract, succeeding Dónal O'Grady.

On 14 July 2013, Allen guided Limerick to a first Munster final appearance in six years, with his own native Cork providing the opposition. An even first half culminated with Cork's Patrick Horgan receiving a red card for striking Limerick wing-back Paudie O'Brien on the helmet under a high ball. Limerick took complete control in the second half and powered to a 0–24 to 0–15 victory. While Limerick were subsequently seen as favourites to land the All-Ireland crown, their championship campaign came to an end following an All-Ireland semi-final defeat by Clare.

While the Limerick County Board had hoped that Allen would remain as manager, he announced on 9 September 2013 that he was stepping down as Limerick manager.

== Honours ==
=== Player ===
Aghabullogue

- Mid Cork Junior A Hurling Championship: 1973, 1974, 1976

St. Finbarr's

- All-Ireland Senior Club Hurling Championship: 1978
- All-Ireland Senior Club Football Championship: 1980, 1981, 1987
- Munster Senior Club Hurling Championship: 1978, 1980
- Munster Senior Club Football Championship: 1979, 1980, 1982, 1986
- Cork Senior Hurling Championship: 1977, 1980, 1981, 1982, 1984
- Cork Senior Football Championship: 1979, 1980, 1982, 1985

Cork

- All-Ireland Senior Hurling Championship: 1976, 1978
- Munster Senior Hurling Championship: 1976, 1978
- Munster Senior Football Championship: 1983
- National Football League: 1979–80
- All-Ireland Under-21 Hurling Championship: 1976
- Munster Under-21 Hurling Championship: 1976

=== Management ===
Cork

- All-Ireland Senior Hurling Championship: 2004, 2005
- Munster Senior Hurling Championship: 2003, 2005, 2006

Limerick

- Munster Senior Hurling Championship: 2013

Sporting positions
Preceded by Dónal O'Grady	Cork Senior Hurling Manager; 2004–2006	Succeeded by Gerald McCarthy
Preceded by Dónal O'Grady	Limerick Senior hurling Manager; 2011–2013	Succeeded by T. J. Ryan; Dónal O'Grady
Achievements
Preceded by Dónal O'Grady	All-Ireland Senior Hurling Final winning manager 2005	Succeeded by Brian Cody
