= Cork–Meath Gaelic football rivalry =

Sports rivalry in Ireland

Cork-Meath
- Location: County Cork; County Meath
- Teams: Cork; Meath
- First meeting: Meath 1-9 - 0-9 Cork; 1967 All-Ireland final (24 September 1967)
- Latest meeting: Cork 0-30 - 1-24 Meath; 2026 All-Ireland group stage (23 May 2026)

Statistics
- Total meetings: 9
- Most wins: Meath (5)
- Top scorer: Brian Stafford (0-28)
- All-time series: Meath 5-1-3 Cork

The Cork-Meath rivalry is a Gaelic football rivalry between Irish county teams Cork and Meath, who first played each other in 1967. It is considered to be one of the most bitter rivalries in modern Gaelic games. Cork's home ground is Páirc Uí Chaoimh and Meath's home ground is Páirc Tailteann, however, all of their championship meetings have been held at neutral venues, usually Croke Park.

While Cork have the second highest number of Munster titles and Meath are second to Dublin in Leinster, they have also enjoyed success in the All-Ireland Senior Football Championship, having won 14 championship titles between them to date.

== Statistics ==
Team	All-Ireland	Provincial	National League	Total
Cork	7	37	8	52
Meath	7	21	7	35
Combined	14	58	15	87

== All-time results ==
=== Legend ===
Cork win
Meath win
Match was a draw

=== Senior ===
No.	Date	Winners	Score	Runners-up	Venue	Stage
1.	24 September 1967	Meath	1-09 - 0-09	Cork	Croke Park	All-Ireland final
2.	20 September 1987	Meath	1-14 - 0-11	Cork	Croke Park	All-Ireland final
3.	18 September 1988	Meath	0-12 - 1-09	Cork	Croke Park	All-Ireland final
4.	9 October 1988	Meath	0-13 - 0-12	Cork	Croke Park	All-Ireland final replay
5.	16 September 1990	Cork	0-11 - 0-09	Meath	Croke Park	All-Ireland final
6.	26 September 1999	Meath	1-11 - 1-08	Cork	Croke Park	All-Ireland final
7.	19 August 2007	Cork	1-16 - 0-09	Meath	Croke Park	All-Ireland semi-final
8.	25 May 2025	Meath	1-13 - 0-12	Cork	Páirc Tailteann	All-Ireland group stages
9.	23 May 2026	Cork	0-30 - 1-24	Meath	Páirc Uí Rinn	All-Ireland group stages

== Records ==
=== Top scorers ===
Team	Player	Score	Total
Cork	Larry Tompkins	0-26	26
Meath	Brian Stafford	0-28	28
