= St Mary's GAA (Shandon) =

Gaelic games club in County Cork, Ireland

St Mary's
- Naomh Muire
- County: Cork
- Grounds: Shandon

Senior Club Championships
	All Ireland	Munster champions	Cork champions
Hurling:	0	0	0

St Mary's GAA was a Gaelic Athletic Association club located in the Shandon area of Cork, Ireland. The club took its name from the nearby Cathedral of St Mary and St Anne. The club was predominantly involved with the game of hurling and fielded teams from the 1880s until the 1920s.

== Notable players ==
- Fan Barry
- Paddy Healy
- Dan Kennefick
- Tim Nagle
- Paddy O'Halloran
