= 1947 All-Ireland Junior Hurling Championship =

All Ireland Champions
- Winners: Cork (5th win)
- Captain: Mick O'Toole

All Ireland Runners-up
- Runners-up: London

Provincial Champions
- Munster: Cork
- Leinster: Dublin
- Ulster: Donegal
- Connacht: Galway

The 1947 All-Ireland Junior Hurling Championship was the 26th staging of the All-Ireland Junior Championship since its establishment by the Gaelic Athletic Association in 1912.

Kilkenny entered the championship as the defending champions, however, they were beaten in the Leinster Championship.

The All-Ireland final was played on 14 September 1947 at Enniscorthy Sportsfield, between Cork and London, in what was their first ever meeting in the final. Cork won the match by 3–10 to 2–03 to claim their fifth championship title overall and a first title since 1940.

== Results ==
=== All-Ireland Junior Hurling Championship ===
==== All-Ireland semi-finals ====
17 August 1947 Semi-final	Donegal	0-00 - 5-06	Galway	Ballybofey Sportsfield

17 August 1947 Semi-final	Galway	3-06 - 5-01	Cork	Ballinasloe Sportsfield

==== All-Ireland home final ====
31 August 1947 Home final	Cork	4-10 - 2-05	Dublin	Thurles Sportsfield

==== All-Ireland final ====
14 September 1947 Final	Cork	3-10 - 2-03	London	Enniscorthy Sportsfield
