= Dan Kenefick =

Irish hurler

Dan Kennefick
Personal information
- Native name: Dónall Ciniféic (Irish)
- Born: 5 May 1888 Glasheen, Cork, Ireland
- Died: 20 May 1960 (aged 72) Bon Secours Hospital, Cork, Ireland
- Occupation: Civil servant

Sport
- Sport: Hurling
- Position: Forward
Club
- Years: Club
- St Mary's
Club titles
- Cork titles: 0
Inter-county
- Years: County
- 1912-1913: Cork
Inter-county titles
- Munster titles: 1
- All-Irelands: 0
- NHL: 0

Daniel Kennefick (5 May 1888 – 29 May 1960) was an Irish hurler. He lined out at club level with St Mary's and was also a member of the Cork senior hurling team. His son, Mick Kennefick, also played with Cork and became the youngest All-Ireland-winning captain in 1943.

== Honours ==
Cork

- Munster Senior Hurling Championship (1): 1912
