= 1969–70 Harty Cup =

Hurling tournament

1969–70 Dr Harty Cup
- Dates: 19 October 1969 – 22 March 1970
- Teams: 11
- Champions: North Monastery (14th title); Des O'Grady (captain)
- Runners-up: Limerick CBS; Liam Foley (captain)

Tournament statistics
- Matches played: 9
- Goals scored: 67 (7.44 per match)
- Points scored: 117 (13 per match)
- Top scorer(s): Gerry Hanley (6-10)

The 1969–70 Harty Cup was the 50th staging of the Harty Cup since the establishment of the hurling competition by the Munster Council of the Gaelic Athletic Association in 1918. In a change to recent years, teams were reduced from 15 to 13-a-side. The competition contested from 19 October 1969 to 22 March 1970 at Dr Mannix Sportsfield in Charleville.

St Finbarr's College unsuccessfully defended its title in the first round losing to Limerick CBS.

North Monastery won the Harty Cup final on 22 March 1970, 6–05 to 4–07, against Limerick CBS, in what was their fourth overall meeting in the competition and second meeting in the final after a hiatus since 1955; and North Monastery's 14th successive Harty Cup title overall after their first title since 1961.

North Monastery's Gerry Hanley was the top scorer with 6–10.

== Results ==
=== First round ===
19 October 1969 First round	St Finbarr's College	5-06 - 9-09	Limerick CBS	Dr Mannix Sportsfield
	N Crowley 2-2, T Fogarty 2-0, B Lynch 1-0, D O'Flynn 0-2, P O'Connell 0-1, S Kelly 0-1.		L O'Donoghue 3-3, L Foley 2-3, M McKeogh 2-1, P Neville 1-1, E Mitchell 1-0, S Scanlan 0-1.

25 October 1969 First round	De La Salle College Waterford	5-12 - 3-03	Thurles CBS	Clonmel GAA Ground
	L O'Brien 1-5, J Comerford 1-1, D Corcoran 0-4, E Dunphy 1-0, P McCarthy 1-0, D Twomey 1-0, J Cullinane 0-1, M O'Mara 0-1.		J Ryan 2-0, C O'Brien 1-1, J O'Dwyer 0-1, J Kane 0-1.

22 October 1969 First round	St Flannan's College	1-09 - 1-03	Coláiste Chríost Rí	FitzGerald Park
	J McKenna 1-5, E Ryan 0-1, C Honan 0-1, M Moroney 0-1, L Heffernan 0-1.		N Miller 1-1, M Doherty 0-1, S Coughlan 0-1.

26 October 1969 First round	St Colman's College	w/o - scr.	Mount Sion CBS	Walsh Park

2 November 1969 First round	North Monastery	7-13 - 4-01	Ennis CBS	Fr Con Buckley Park
	G Hanley 4-7, R Fitzgerald 1-2, F Coughlan 1-2, D O'Connell 1-1, S Greene 0-1.		M O'Connell 2-0, J Pilkington 1-0, C Ryan 1-0, M O'Leary 0-1.

- Coláiste Iognáid Rís received a bye in this round.

=== Quarter-finals ===
23 November 1969 Quarter-final	De La Salle College Waterford	0-07 - 6-08	Limerick CBS	Leahy Park
	L O'Brien 0-2, E Dunphy 0-1, M O'Meara 0-1, D Corcoran 0-1, J Comerford 0-1, D Twomey 0-1.		M McKeogh 3-2, L O'Donoghue 2-2, L Foley 0-4, P Herbert 1-0.

27 November 1969 Quarter-final	North Monastery	4-06 - 4-04	Coláiste Iognáid Rís	Cork Athletic Grounds
	F Coughlan 2-0, G Hanley 1-2, Des O'Grady 1-0, M Corbett 0-3, D O'Brien 0-1.		P O'Connell 2-3, S Collins 1-0, B Cotter 1-0, D Collins 0-1.

- St Colman's College and St Flannan's College received byes in this round.

=== Semi-finals ===
1 March 1970 Semi-final	North Monastery	0-08 - 1-02	St Flannan's College	Dr Mannix Sportsfield
	Des O'Grady 0-2, F Coughlan 0-2, G Hanley 0-1, K O'Connor 0-1, S Greene 0-1, K Fitzgerald 0-1.		D O'Dwyer 1-0, J McKenna 0-2.

8 March 1970 Semi-final	Limerick CBS	4-08 - 3-06	St Colman's College	Dr Mannix Sportsfield
	P Neville 2-0, D Mitchell 1-1, M McKeogh 1-0, M Sheehan 0-3, L Foley 0-3, L O'Donoghue 0-1.		S O'Leary 1-6, M Carroll 1-0, P Hogan 1-0.

=== Final ===
22 March 1970 Final	North Monastery	6-05 - 4-07	Limerick CBS	Dr Mannix Sportsfield
	S Greene 2-2, T Harris 1-0, G Hanley 1-0, Des O'Grady 1-0, S O'Connell 1-0, M Corbett 0-3.		P Neville 2-2, L Foley 1-2, T Scanlan 1-1, L O'Donoghue 0-1, M McKeogh 0-1.

== Statistics ==
=== Top scorers ===
Rank	Player	County	Tally	Total	Matches	Average
1	Gerry Hanley	North Monastery	6-10	28	4	7.00
2	Martin McKeogh	Limerick CBS	6-04	22	4	5.50
2	Liam O'Donoghue	Limerick CBS	5-07	22	4	5.50
4	Liam Foley	Limerick CBS	3-12	21	4	5.25
5	Pat Neville	Limerick CBS	5-03	18	4	4.50
6	Frank Coughlan	North Monastery	3-04	13	4	3.25
7	Steve Greene	North Monastery	2-04	10	4	2.50
7	Liam O'Brien	De La Salle College	1-07	10	2	5.00
9	Pat O'Connell	Coláiste Iognáid Rís	2-03	9	1	9.00
9	Seánie O'Leary	St Colman's College	1-06	9	1	9.00
