= 1978 All-Ireland Senior Club Hurling Championship final =

1978 All-Ireland Senior Club Hurling Championship Final
- Event: 1977–78 All-Ireland Senior Club Hurling Championship
St Finbarr's	Rathnure
2-7	0-9
- Date: 27 March 1978
- Venue: Semple Stadium, Thurles
- Referee: Noel O'Donoghue (Dublin)

The 1978 All-Ireland Senior Club Hurling Championship final was a hurling match played at Semple Stadium on 27 March 1978 to determine the winners of the 1977–78 All-Ireland Senior Club Hurling Championship, the eighth season of the All-Ireland Senior Club Hurling Championship, a tournament organised by the Gaelic Athletic Association for the champion clubs of the four provinces of Ireland. The final was contested by St Finbarr's of Cork and Rathnure of Wexford, with St Finbarr's winning by 2-7 to 0-9.

The All-Ireland final between St Finbarr's and Rathnure was a unique occasion as it was the first ever championship meeting between the two teams. It remains their only championship meeting. St Finbarr's were hoping to become only the third team to win a second All-Ireland title. Rathnure were appearing in their third All-Ireland final having never won the title.

A gale-force wind hindered the St Finbarr's challenge in the opening half, allowing Rathnure to take a 0-8 to 0-1 interval lead. Ten minutes from the full-time whistle Barry Wiley scored an equalizer that gave "the Barr's" an increased impetus. A Jimmy Barry-Murphy goal from a rebound settled the game as St Finbarr's claimed a four-point victory.

The All-Ireland victory for St Finbarr's was the second of their two championship titles. They were the third Cork representatives to win two All-Ireland titles.

== Match ==
=== Details ===
27 March 1978

St Finbarr's	2-7 - 0-9	Rathnure
C McCarthy 0-4 (4f), É Fitzpatrick 1-0, J Barry-Murphy 1-0, B Wiley 0-2, B Meade 0-1.		J Houlihan 0-3, J Murphy 0-2, D Quigley 0-2, M Quigley 0-1, J Quigley 0-1.

Semple Stadium, Thurles
Attendance: 3,000
Referee: N O'Donoghue (Dublin)

St Finbarr's	Rathnure
