= 1955–56 Harty Cup =

1955–56 Dr Harty Cup
- Champions: Thurles CBS (6th title); T. Gleeson (captain)
- Runners-up: North Monastery; S. O'Brien (captain)

The 1955–56 Harty Cup was the 36th staging of the Harty Cup since its establishment in hurling by the Munster Council of Gaelic Athletic Association in 1918.

North Monastery were the defending champions.

The final was played on 25 March 1956 at the Gaelic Grounds in Limerick, between Thurles CBS and North Monastery, in what was their fourth meeting overall in the final. Thurles CBS won the match by 2–05 to 2–03 to claim their sixth Harty Cup title overall and a first title in five years.

== Knockout stage ==
=== Final ===
25 March 1956 Final	Thurles CBS	2-05 - 2-03	North Monastery	Gaelic Grounds
	J Doyle 1-3, P McGree 1-1, P Butler 0-1.
