= 1912 All-Ireland Senior Hurling Championship final =

1912 All-Ireland Senior Hurling Final
- Event: 1912 All-Ireland Senior Hurling Championship
Kilkenny	Cork
2-1	1-3
- Date: 17 November 1912
- Venue: Jones' Road, Dublin
- Referee: M. F. Crowe (Limerick)
- Attendance: 18,000

The 1912 All-Ireland Senior Hurling Championship Final was the 25th All-Ireland Final and the culmination of the 1912 All-Ireland Senior Hurling Championship, an inter-county hurling tournament for the top teams in Ireland. The match was held at Jones' Road, Dublin, on 17 November 1912, between Kilkenny, represented by club side Tullaroan, and Cork, represented by club side Blackrock.

The Munster champions lost to their Leinster opponents on a score line of 2–1 to 1–3 with Sim Walton 1-1 and Matt Gargan 1-0 the scorers for Kilkenny.

This match was the first All-Ireland Hurling final to have a bigger attendance than the same year's football final.

== Match details ==
1912-11-17

Kilkenny	2-1 – 1-3	Cork

Jones' Road, Dublin
Attendance: 18,000
Referee: M. F. Crowe (Limerick)
