= Nemeton TV =

Irish television and film production company

- Type: Subsidiary
- Industry: Television
- Genre: Docuseries
- Founded: 1993
- Founder: Irial Mac Murchú
- Headquarters: Ring, County Waterford, Ireland
- Parent: BT Ireland (2005–present)
- Website: https://nemeton.ie/

Nemeton TV, is an Irish television and film production company. It is based in An Rinn in the Waterford Gaeltacht, and it also has an office in Glasgow. Nemeton produces over 600 hours of sports coverage each year and 20 hours of documentaries. A significant proportion of the content produced is in the Irish language, with a number of programmes being produced for TG4 such as live Gaelic Athletic Association GAA and rugby. Nemeton also produces content for RTÉ, BBC, Sky Sports, and ESPN, through the Glasgow office for BBC Scotland and Scottish Gaelic channel BBC Alba. Nemeton produces content (covers games) for the GAAGO streaming service.

== History ==
Nemeton was founded by former journalist Irial Mac Murchú in 1993. The company has supplied sports coverage to TG4 since 1996. This has included Gaelic Athletic Association competitions. They produced the series Laochra Gael ('Heroes of the Gaels') which first aired on TG4 in 2001 and has continued for more than twenty series.

In 2017, a three-year deal for sports on BBC Alba with Nemeton Scotland Ltd was announced. Under the deal, the BBC Alba coverage would include Guinness Pro12 rugby, Scottish Premiership football (SPFL) and shinty.

Waterford Institute of Technology and Nemeton TV run a Higher Diploma in Arts in Television Production supported by Údarás na Gaeltachta. Classes were planned to take place both at WIT (now Southeastern Technological University) and in the Nemeton TV training studios in An Rinn.

Maidhcí Ó Súilleabháin serves as the outside broadcast director and executive content director.

In an interview in The Guardian, Mac Murchú stated that a strategy, to incorporate the Irish language as a core part of Nemeton's marketing, has highlighted the broader business potential of minority languages.
