= 1977–78 All-Ireland Senior Club Hurling Championship =

All-Ireland Senior Club Hurling Championship 1977–78
Championship Details
- Dates: 22 October 1977 – 27 March 1978

All Ireland Champions
- Winners: St. Finbarr's (2nd win)
- Captain: Denis Burns

All Ireland Runners-up
- Runners-up: Rathnure

Provincial Champions
- Munster: St. Finbarr's
- Leinster: Rathnure
- Ulster: O'Donovan Rossa
- Connacht: Four Roads

Championship Statistics
- Top Scorer: Éamonn Fitzpatrick (6–06)

The 1977–78 All-Ireland Senior Club Hurling Championship was the eighth staging of the All-Ireland Senior Club Hurling Championship, the Gaelic Athletic Association's premier inter-county club hurling tournament. The championship ran from 22 October 1977 to 27 March 1978.

Glen Rovers of Cork were the defending champions, however, they failed to qualify after being beaten by St Finbarr's in the 1977 Cork SHC final. Kilruane MacDonagh's of Tipperary and Sixmilebridge of Clare made their championship debut.

The All-Ireland final was played at Semple Stadium in Thurles on 27 March 1978, between St Finbarr's of Cork and Rathnure of Wexford, in what was a first championship meeting between the teams. St Finbarr's won the match by 2–07 to 0–09 and became the third team to win the title twice.

Éamonn Fitzpatrick was the championship's top scorer with 6–06.

== Connacht Senior Club Hurling Championship ==
=== Connacht first round ===
6 November 1977 First round	Allen Gaels	–	Tubbercurry	Allen Gaels Grounds

6 November 1977 First round	Four Roads	3–05 – 0–02	Ballinrobe	Athleague Sportsfield
	P Gately 2-1, S Fitzgerald 1-0, K Moran 0-2, P Kelly 0-1, B Tansey 0-1.		P Craddock 0-2.

=== Connacht semi-final ===
20 November 1977 Semi-final	Tubbercurry	0–01 – 3–04	Four Roads	Kilcoyne Park
	J McDonagh 0-1.

=== Connacht final ===
5 February 1978 Final	Four Roads	w/o – susp.	Kiltormer	Athleague Sportsfield

== Leinster Senior Club Hurling Championship ==
=== Leinster first round ===
22 October 1977 First round	Carlow Town	3–08 – 5–13	Éire Óg	Dr Cullen Park
	T Walsh 2–1, R Moore 1–2, M Power 0–4, J Delaney 0–1.		P Dunny 2–6, P Campbell 1–2, G Power 1–2, J Murphy 1–1, J Winders 0–1, M Lynch 0–1.	Referee: J Rankins (Laois)

6 November 1977 First round	Wolfe Tones	1–00 – 11–20	O'Tooles	Gaelic Grounds
	P Whelan 1-0.		M Cunningham 4-4, J Wallace 1-6, J Whelan 2-1, J Morris 2-1, P Murphy 2-1, P Carton 0-3, E Ryan 0-2, F Murphy 0-2.	Referee: T Murtagh

13 November 1977 First round	Arklow Rock Parnells	4–06 – 1–07	Kilmessan	Aughrim County Ground
	J Reilly 1–2, W Reilly 1–1, A Byrne 1–1, K Mellon 1–0, T Byrne 0–1, H Kavanagh 0–1.		C Maguire 0–4, J Walsh 1–0, G Higgins 0–1, E O'Neill 0–1, C Kildillon 0–1.

=== Leinster quarter-finals ===
6 November 1977 Quarter-final	Coolderry	1–15 – 1–07	Brownstown	St Brendan's Park
	P Moloughney 0–8, M Kennedy 1–2, P Carroll 0–2, O Kennedy 0–1, M King 0–1, C Loughnane 0–1.		C Shaw 1–1, P Shaw 0–3, T Kelly 0–1, N Fitzsimons 0–1, T Carr 0–1.

13 November 1977 Quarter-final	Éire Óg	0–03 – 2–12	Camross	Geraldine Park
	P Connolly 0–2, G Power 0–1.		F Keenan 1–3, M Cuddy 1–2, S Cuddy 0–3, PJ Cuddy 0–2, S Bergin 0–1, M Cuddy 0–1.

20 November 1977 Quarter-final	Arklow Rock Parnells	1–02 – 0–12	Rathnure	Pearse Park
	J Byrne 1–0, G Byrne 0–1, B Reilly 0–1.		D O'Connor 0–6, P Quigley 0–2, P Flynn 0–2, D Quigley 0–1, M Quigley 0–1.

27 November 1977 Quarter-final	O'Tooles	0–08 – 2–08	The Fenians	Croke Park
	J Wallace 0–4, F Murphy 0–2, P Murphy 0–1, P Browne 0–1.		J Moriarty 1–2, M Garrett 1–0, G Henderson 0–2, B Fitzpatrick 0–2, J Ryan 0–1, P Delaney 0–1.	Referee: G Delaney (Wicklow)

=== Leinster semi-finals ===
4 December 1977 Semi-final	Camross	1–05 – 1–09	Rathnure	Geraldine Park
	S Cuddy 0–5, F Keenan 1–0.		D O'Connor 0–5, M Quigley 1–0, J Quigley 0–2, P Flynn 0–1, D Quigley 0–1.

11 December 1977 Semi-final	The Fenians	3–06 – 1–05	Coolderry	Kelly Dally Park
	P Delaney 2–1, W Watson 1–0, B Fitzpatrick 0–2, J Moriarty 0–2, M Garrett 0–1.		M Teehan 1–0, P Moloughney 0–3, O Kennedy 0–1, C Loughnane 0–1.

=== Leinster final ===
5 March 1978 Final	Rathnure	0–16 – 1–10	The Fenians	Dr Cullen Park
	D Quigley 0–4, M Quigley 0–3, J Murphy 0–3, J Conran 0–2, J Holohan 0–2, P Flynn 0–1, D O'Connor 0–1.		B Fitzpatrick 0–7, P Delaney 1–0, M Garrett 0–1, G Henderson 0–1, B Watson 0–1.

== Munster Senior Club Hurling Championship ==
=== Munster first round ===
23 October 1977 First round	Portlaw	3–09 – 5–07	St Finbarr's	Páirc de Hindenburg
	T Cheasty 1–1, J Whelan 1–0, M Regan 1–0, P Kelly 0–3, H Maher 0–3, M Hickey 0–1, K Brophy 0–1.		J Barry-Murphy 4–1, B Wiley 1–1, É Fitzpatrick 0–2, C McCarthy 0–1, G McCarthy 0–1, C Ryan 0–1.

4 December 1977 First round	Patrickswell	2–07 – 3–05	Kilruane MacDonagh's	Gaelic Grounds
	J Lynch 1–3, D Punch 1–0, R Bennis 0–2, L Foley 0–2.		S O'Meara 1–3, S Hennessy 1–1, J Williams 1–0, G Williams 0–1.	Referee: J Woods (Clare)

=== Munster semi-finals ===
13 November 1977 Semi-final	St Finbarr's	3–11 – 1–04	Ballyduff	Páirc Uí Chaoimh
	É Fitzpatrick 2–2, C McCarthy 1–4, B Wiley 0–2, J Allen 0–1, C Ryan 0–1, M Kennedy 0–1, J O'Shea 0–1.		M Hennessy 1–0, J O'Grady 0–3, J Bunyan 0–1.

11 December 1977 Semi-final	Kilruane MacDonagh's	0–08 – 1–07	Sixmilebridge	MacDonagh Park
	S Hennessy 0–2, J Williams 0–2, S O'Meara 0–2, G Williams 0–1, J Reddin 0–1.		M White 1–0, P Morey 0–3, N Casey 0–2, P Chaplin 0–1, L Quinlan 0–1.

=== Munster final ===
18 December 1977 Final	Sixmilebridge	3–05 – 3–05	St Finbarr's	Dr Daly Park
	N Casey 1–1, S Stack 1–1, M White 1–0, L Quinlan 0–2, P Morey 0–1.		C McCarthy 2-02, C Ryan 1–0, J Allen 0–2, J O'Shea 0–1.	Referee: S O'Meara (Tipperary)

=== Munster final replay ===
22 January 1978 Final replay	St Finbarr's	2–08 – 0–06	Sixmilebridge	Seán Treacy Park
	J Allen 1–1, É Fitzpatrick 1–0, G McCarthy 0–3, B Wiley 0–1, J Barry-Murphy 0–1, C Ryan 0–1, J Fleming 0–1.		F Quilligan 0–3, P Morey 0–2, N Casey 0–1.	Referee: S O'Meara (Tipperary)

== Ulster Senior Club Hurling Championship ==
=== Ulster semi-final ===
23 October 1977 Semi-final	Ballycran	4–07 – 1–10	Cúchullains	Páirc Esler

=== Ulster final ===
6 November 1977 Final	O'Donovan Rossa	1–13 – 2–06	Ballycran	Casement Park
	A Hamill 1-6, L Hamill 0-2, J Fegan 0-2, J O'Neill 0-2, B Quinn 0-1.		M O'Flynn 1-3, B Gilmore 1-0, B Mullan 0-2, D Mullan 0-1.

== All-Ireland Senior Club Hurling Championship ==
=== All-Ireland quarter-final ===
5 February 1978 Quarter-final	O'Donovan Rossa	2–11 – 1–09	St Gabriel's	Corrigan Park
	A Hamill 1–10, P Armstrong 1-0, J O'Neill 0-1.		F Canning 0-7, J Geoghegan 1-0, M Linnane 0-1, P Fahy 0-1.

=== All-Ireland semi-final ===
26 March 1978 Semi-final	Rathnure	2–20 – 2–08	Four Roads	Wexford Park
	M Quigley 1–4, P Flynn 1–2, J Holohan 0–4, D Quigley 0–4, L Byrne 0–3, T O'Connor 0–1, S Murphy 0–1, P Quigley 0–1.		F Kelly 0–4, M Gately 1–0, B McDonald 1–0, F Mitchell 0–2, B Tansey 0–2.	Referee: M Slattery (Clare)

26 March 1978 Semi-final	St Finbarr's	6–12 – 1–16	O'Donovan Rossa	Neenan Park
	É Fitzpatrick 2–2, B Meade 1–2, J Barry-Murphy 1–1, J O'Shea 1–0, J Allen 1–0, G McCarthy 0–2, C McCarthy 0–2, C Roche 0–1, M Kennedy 0–1, T Butler 0–1.		R Galway 0–7, L Hamill 1–2, P Armstrong 0–3, B Quinn 0–1, L Fagan 0–1, B Gormely 0–1, J O'Neill 0–1.

=== All-Ireland final ===
27 March 1978 Final	St Finbarr's	2–07 – 0–09	Rathnure	Semple Stadium
	C McCarthy 0–4, É Fitzpatrick 1–0, J Barry-Murphy 1–0, B Wiley 0–2, B Meade 0–1.		J Holohan 0–3, J Murphy 0–2, D Quigley 0–2, M Quigley 0–1, J Quigley 0–1.

== Statistics ==
=== Top scorers ===
Rank	Player	County	Tally	Total	Matches	Average
1	Éamonn Fitzpatrick	St Finbarr's	6–06	24	6	4.00
2	Charlie McCarthy	St Finbarr's	3–13	22	6	3.66
2	Aidan Hamill	O'Donovan Rossa	2–16	22	2	11.00
4	Jimmy Barry-Murphy	St Finbarr's	6–03	21	6	3.50
5	Mick Cunningham	O'Tooles	4–04	16	2	8.00

=== Miscellaneous ===
- St Finbarr's join fellow Cork clubs Blackrock and Glen Rovers by becoming the third team to win a second All-Ireland title.
